= National Register of Historic Places listings in Frederick County, Maryland =

Location of Frederick County in Maryland

This is a list of the National Register of Historic Places listings in Frederick County, Maryland.

This is intended to be a complete list of the properties and districts on the National Register of Historic Places in Frederick County, Maryland, United States. Latitude and longitude coordinates are provided for many National Register properties and districts; these locations may be seen together in a map.

There are 104 properties and districts listed on the National Register in the county, and two former listings.

Contents: Counties in Maryland
Allegany - Anne Arundel - Baltimore (city) - Baltimore County - Calvert - Caroline - Carroll - Cecil - Charles - Dorchester - Frederick - Garrett - Harford - Howard - Kent - Montgomery - Prince George's - Queen Anne's - Somerset - St. Mary's - Talbot - Washington - Wicomico - Worcester

This National Park Service list is complete through NPS recent listings posted March 27, 2026.

== Current listings ==
	Name on the Register	Image	Date listed	Location	City or town	Description
1	Airview Historic District	Airview Historic District	December 29, 2004 (#04001404)	701-720 E. Main St. extended 39°26′26″N 77°31′46″W	Middletown	
2	Amelung House and Glassworks	Amelung House and Glassworks	October 3, 1973 (#73000919)	2531 Park Mills Road; 39°18′02″N 77°24′11″W	Urbana	
3	Arcadia	Arcadia	August 3, 1978 (#78001458)	4720 Buckeystown Pike Maryland Route 85; 39°21′51″N 77°25′08″W	Frederick	
4	Beatty-Cramer House	Beatty-Cramer House	August 17, 2021 (#100006825)	9010 Liberty Road; 39°27′12″N 77°21′14″W	Frederick vicinity	
5	Bennies Hill Road Bridge	Bennies Hill Road Bridge	June 27, 1979 (#79003265)	Southwest of Middletown on Bennies Hill Rd. over Catoctin Creek; 39°24′34″N 77°34′12″W	Middletown	
6	Biggs Ford Site		June 10, 1975 (#75000894)	Address Restricted	Frederick	
7	Bloomsbury		September 13, 2000 (#00001053)	2062 Thurston Rd. 39°18′23″N 77°22′09″W	Frederick	
8	Bowlus Mill House	Bowlus Mill House	March 26, 1996 (#96000300)	8123 Old Hagerstown Rd. 39°27′20″N 77°33′35″W	Spoolsville	
9	Henry Brandenburg House		December 11, 2020 (#100005908)	9057 Myersville Rd. 39°28′57″N 77°32′38″W	Myersville vicinity	
10	Brunswick Historic District	Brunswick Historic District	August 29, 1979 (#79001128)	Roughly bounded by the Potomac River, Central, Park, and 10th Aves., and C St. 39°18′41″N 77°37′30″W	Brunswick	Contributing buildings include B&O Station and Red Men Hall
11	Buckeystown Historic District	Buckeystown Historic District	April 6, 1982 (#82002811)	Maryland Route 85; 39°19′53″N 77°26′04″W	Buckeystown	
12	Buckingham House and Industrial School Complex	Buckingham House and Industrial School Complex	May 20, 1982 (#82002812)	Off Maryland Routes 80 and 85; 39°18′52″N 77°25′26″W	Buckeystown	
13	Bullfrog Road Bridge	Bullfrog Road Bridge	November 21, 1978 (#78001461)	Northwest of Taneytown off Maryland Route 97; 39°41′44″N 77°14′25″W	Taneytown	
14	Burkittsville Historic District	Burkittsville Historic District	November 20, 1975 (#75000891)	Maryland Route 17 and Jefferson-Boonsboro Rd. 39°23′31″N 77°37′39″W	Burkittsville	
15	Camp Greentop Historic District	Camp Greentop Historic District	October 11, 1989 (#89001583)	Off Park Central Rd. in Catoctin Mountain Park; 39°38′39″N 77°28′35″W	Thurmont	
16	Camp Misty Mount Historic District	Camp Misty Mount Historic District	October 11, 1989 (#89001582)	Off Park Central Rd. in Catoctin Mountain Park; 39°38′31″N 77°26′55″W	Thurmont	
17	Carrollton Manor	Carrollton Manor	November 17, 1997 (#97001294)	5809 Manor Woods Rd. 39°19′28″N 77°28′12″W	Buckeystown	
18	Catoctin Furnace Historic District	Catoctin Furnace Historic District	February 11, 1972 (#72000578)	Eastern side of U.S. Route 15; 39°34′35″N 77°26′02″W	Catoctin Furnace	
19	Catoctin Mountain Park	Catoctin Mountain Park	August 7, 2014 (#14000484)	6602 Foxville Rd. 39°38′54″N 77°28′00″W	Thurmont	
20	Ceres Bethel AME Church	Ceres Bethel AME Church	December 22, 2020 (#100005982)	Gapland Rd., approx. 2 mi. west of Burkittsville; 39°24′06″N 77°38′16″W	Burkittsville	
21	Chesapeake and Ohio Canal National Historical Park	Chesapeake and Ohio Canal National Historical Park	October 15, 1966 (#66000036)	Bordering the Potomac River from Georgetown, D.C. to Cumberland, Maryland; 38°53′59″N 77°03′28″W	Brunswick, Point of Rocks	
22	Joanna & Dennis D. H. Clemson Farm		June 20, 2025 (#100011329)	14121 Pearre Road; 39°31′30″N 77°10′14″W	Union Bridge vicinity	
23	Cockey-Jamison-Hendrickson House and Store	Cockey-Jamison-Hendrickson House and Store	November 28, 2018 (#100003151)	3409 Urbana Pike; 39°19′34″N 77°20′56″W	Urbana	
24	Crampton's Gap Historic District	Crampton's Gap Historic District	January 12, 2011 (#10000576)	Route 17; Gapland Rd.; Mountain Church Rd.; Brownsville Pass Rd.; Townsend Rd. 39°24′21″N 77°38′24″W	Burkittsville	South Mountain Battlefields—September 14, 1862, MPS
25	Crum Road Bridge	Crum Road Bridge	December 28, 1978 (#78001463)	East of Walkersville at Crum Rd. and Israel's Creek; 39°22′53″N 77°27′05″W	Walkersville	Moved to Ballenger Creek Park in Frederick. Coordinates at current location.
26	Victor Cullen Center, Old Administration Building	Victor Cullen Center, Old Administration Building	August 22, 1990 (#90001228)	Victor Cullen Center Campus; 39°42′40″N 77°27′26″W	Sabillasville	
27	Victor Cullen School Power House	Victor Cullen School Power House	January 7, 1987 (#87000045)	Maryland Route 81; 39°42′52″N 77°27′43″W	Sabillasville	
28	Drummine Farm	Drummine Farm	January 8, 1987 (#86003543)	6901 Green Valley Rd. 39°25′39″N 77°14′43″W	New Market	
29	Emmitsburg Historic District	Emmitsburg Historic District	March 10, 1992 (#92000076)	Roughly, Main St. east of Mountain View Cemetery to Creamery Rd. and Seton Ave. adjacent to Main; also a portion of the south side of the 400 block of West Lincoln Avenue, from Patterson Avenue, 375’ west, to the west property line of 439 West Lincoln Avenue; 39°42′16″N 77°19′40″W	Emmitsburg	Second set of addresses represent a boundary increase approved April 8, 2024.
30	John Eyler Farmstead	John Eyler Farmstead	September 13, 2006 (#06000817)	7216 Eylers Valley Flint Rd. 39°40′40″N 77°25′01″W	Thurmont	
31	Fat Oxen	Fat Oxen	May 21, 1979 (#79001133)	North of Urbana on Maryland Route 355; 39°20′00″N 77°21′23″W	Urbana	
32	Fourpoints Bridge	Fourpoints Bridge	November 29, 1978 (#78001457)	Southeast of Emmitsburg; 39°40′17″N 77°18′04″W	Emmitsburg	
33	Frederick Armory	Frederick Armory	September 25, 1985 (#85002672)	Bentz and 2nd Sts. 39°25′00″N 77°24′53″W	Frederick	
34	Frederick Historic District	Frederick Historic District	October 18, 1973 (#73000916)	2 blocks east and 3 blocks west of Market St., from South St. to 7th St. 39°24′53″N 77°24′43″W	Frederick	
35	Gambrill House	Gambrill House	November 18, 1985 (#85002902)	Monocacy National Battlefield off Maryland Route 355; 38°21′56″N 77°23′11″W	Frederick	
36	Graceham Moravian Church and Parsonage	Graceham Moravian Church and Parsonage	May 13, 1976 (#76000995)	2 miles east of Thurmont on Maryland Route 77; 39°36′59″N 77°22′43″W	Thurmont	
37	Peter of P. Grossnickel Farm	Peter of P. Grossnickel Farm	July 31, 1998 (#98000944)	11720 Wolfsville Rd. 39°33′25″N 77°31′38″W	Myersville	
38	Guilford	Guilford	October 14, 1975 (#75000895)	5900 Frederick Crossing Lane; 38°23′43″N 77°24′51″W	Frederick	
39	Harris Farm	Harris Farm	July 29, 1994 (#94000799)	Junction of Devilbiss and Glade Rds. 39°29′55″N 77°20′57″W	Walkersville	
40	Hessian Barracks	Hessian Barracks	January 25, 1971 (#71000373)	242 S. Market St. 39°24′33″N 77°24′34″W	Frederick	
41	Highland Lodge	Highland Lodge	October 22, 1998 (#98001262)	5519 Old National Pike; 39°25′11″N 77°28′31″W	Frederick	
42	Hood College Historic District	Hood College Historic District	December 30, 2002 (#02001581)	401 Rosemont Ave. 39°25′21″N 77°25′07″W	Frederick	
43	Hopewell	Hopewell	December 8, 1980 (#80001803)	Pearre and Clemsonville Rds. 39°31′32″N 77°10′13″W	Union Bridge	
44	Abraham Jones House	Abraham Jones House	July 24, 1973 (#73000917)	12106 Main Street (MD 26); 39°29′07″N 77°14′24″W	Libertytown	
45	Kemp Property		July 3, 2025 (#100011982)	1761 Eagle Rock Lane; 39°26′26″N 77°26′27″W	Frederick	
46	Kitterman-Buckey Farm		December 28, 2005 (#05001479)	12529 Molasses Rd. 39°31′50″N 77°13′31″W	Johnsville	
47	L'Hermitage Slave Village Archeological Site	L'Hermitage Slave Village Archeological Site	January 29, 2008 (#07001450)	4801 Urbana Pike; 39°21′58″N 77°23′25″W	Frederick	
48	LeGore Bridge	LeGore Bridge	September 18, 1978 (#78001464)	North of Woodsboro over the Monocacy River; 39°34′50″N 77°18′50″W	Woodsboro	
49	Lewis Mill Complex	Lewis Mill Complex	May 6, 1982 (#82002813)	3205 Poffenberger Rd. 39°22′20″N 77°33′34″W	Jefferson	
50	Linden Grove	Linden Grove	September 10, 1987 (#87001570)	636 Solarex Court; 39°24′02″N 77°26′01″W	Frederick	
51	Linganore Farm	Linganore Farm	May 5, 2000 (#00000429)	6229 Linganore Rd. 39°24′21″N 77°21′42″W	Frederick	
52	Loats Female Orphan Asylum of Frederick City	Loats Female Orphan Asylum of Frederick City	October 10, 1972 (#72000580)	24 E. Church St. 39°24′54″N 77°24′34″W	Frederick	
53	Loys Station Covered Bridge	Loys Station Covered Bridge	June 23, 1978 (#78003175)	Old Frederick Rd. at Owen's Creek; 39°36′26″N 77°21′08″W	Thurmont	
54	George Markell Farmstead	George Markell Farmstead	December 27, 2002 (#02001584)	4825 Buckeystown Pike; 39°21′58″N 77°24′54″W	Frederick	
55	Mason and Dixon West Line Milestone Markers 76 and 77		August 21, 2018 (#100002789)	716 Mason Dixon Rd. 39°43′12″N 77°13′15″W	Harney	Extends into Adams County, Pennsylvania
56	Thomas Maynard House	Thomas Maynard House	July 18, 1979 (#79001130)	11022 Gas House Pike; 39°25′42″N 77°16′54″W	New London	
57	McKinstry's Mills Historic District	McKinstry's Mills Historic District	April 16, 1997 (#97000338)	1494, 1498, and 10904 McKinstry's Mill Rd. and 4500 and 4504 Sam's Creek Rd. 39°32′00″N 77°09′32″W	Union Bridge	
58	Middletown Historic District	Middletown Historic District	December 24, 2003 (#03001334)	Including E. and W. Main St., Green St., Washington St., Jefferson St., Church St., and Walnut St. 39°26′41″N 77°32′38″W	Middletown	
59	Monocacy National Battlefield	Monocacy National Battlefield	November 8, 1973 (#66000908)	Southeast of Frederick; 39°22′11″N 77°23′29″W	Frederick	
60	Monocacy Site	Monocacy Site	July 30, 1975 (#75000151)	Address Restricted	Dickerson	
61	John C. Motter House	John C. Motter House	December 2, 1982 (#82001592)	1005 Motter Ave. 39°25′38″N 77°24′38″W	Frederick	
62	Mount Airy Historic District	Mount Airy Historic District	September 13, 1984 (#84001589)	Roughly Main, Church, Maple, Park, Hill, and Warfield Sts. 39°22′31″N 77°09′21″W	Mount Airy	
63	Nallin Farm House	Nallin Farm House	May 23, 1974 (#74000951)	Fort Detrick; 39°26′52″N 77°24′51″W	Frederick	
64	Nallin Farm Springhouse and Bank Barn	Nallin Farm Springhouse and Bank Barn	September 16, 1977 (#77000695)	Opossumtown Pike; 39°26′50″N 77°24′54″W	Frederick	
65	Henry Nelson House		December 4, 1980 (#80001811)	10822 Gas House Pike; 39°25′59″N 77°17′14″W	New Market	
66	New Market Historic District	New Market Historic District	December 6, 1975 (#75000897)	Junction of Maryland Route 144 and Old Maryland Route 75; 39°22′58″N 77°16′12″W	New Market	
67	Nolands Ferry I Archeological Site	Nolands Ferry I Archeological Site	October 18, 1985 (#85003152)	Address Restricted	Tuscarora	
68	Oakland	Oakland	April 17, 2019 (#100003656)	1902 Jefferson Pike; 39°20′56″N 77°36′14″W	Petersville	
69	Old Mill Road Bridge	Old Mill Road Bridge	March 7, 1979 (#79001131)	West of Rocky Ridge on Old Mill Rd. over Owens Creek; 39°36′07″N 77°20′19″W	Rocky Ridge	
70	Old National Pike Milestones	Old National Pike Milestones	November 27, 1975 (#75002107)	U.S. Route 40, Alternate U.S. Route 40, and Scenic U.S. Route 40, and Maryland Routes 44 and 165; 39°25′13″N 77°16′01″W	Frederick	
71	One-Million-Liter Test Sphere	One-Million-Liter Test Sphere	November 23, 1977 (#77000696)	North of Frederick on Fort Detrick; 39°26′03″N 77°25′45″W	Frederick	
72	Pearre-Metcalfe House		July 2, 1979 (#79001132)	9084 Albaugh Road; 39°28′58″N 77°09′57″W	New Windsor	
73	Pennterra	Pennterra	January 30, 1976 (#76000992)	12003 Penterra Manor Lane (MD 814); 39°33′59″N 77°20′41″W	Creagerstown	
74	Poffenberger Road Bridge	Poffenberger Road Bridge	November 29, 1978 (#78001459)	South of Middletown; 39°22′54″N 77°34′18″W	Middletown	
75	Point of Rocks Railroad Station	Point of Rocks Railroad Station	April 11, 1973 (#73000918)	On U.S. Route 15; 39°16′24″N 77°32′00″W	Point of Rocks	Gothic Revival-style station built 1873
76	Prospect Hall	Prospect Hall	September 8, 1980 (#80001810)	Southwest of Frederick on Butterfly Lane; 39°18′51″N 77°26′15″W	Frederick	
77	Rich Mountain	Rich Mountain	December 28, 2005 (#05001480)	6434 S. Clifton Rd. 39°24′40″N 77°30′15″W	Frederick	
78	Roddy Road Covered Bridge	Roddy Road Covered Bridge	June 23, 1978 (#78003176)	Roddy Rd. at Owen's Creek; 39°38′26″N 77°23′39″W	Thurmont	
79	Rose Hill Manor	Rose Hill Manor	December 9, 1971 (#71000374)	1611 N. Market St. 39°26′11″N 77°24′21″W	Frederick	
80	Rosenstock Village Site		April 16, 2018 (#100002308)	Address Restricted	Frederick	
81	Routzahn-Miller Farmstead	Routzahn-Miller Farmstead	September 27, 2006 (#06000878)	9117 Frostown Rd. 39°29′09″N 77°35′28″W	Middletown	
82	St. Euphemia's School and Sisters' House	St. Euphemia's School and Sisters' House	September 13, 1984 (#84001770)	5052 DePaul St. 39°42′19″N 77°19′31″W	Emmitsburg	
83	St. John's Church at Creagerstown Historic District	St. John's Church at Creagerstown Historic District	August 28, 2007 (#07000862)	8619 Blacks Mill Rd. 39°34′35″N 77°21′49″W	Thurmont	
84	St. Joseph's College and Mother Seton Shrine	St. Joseph's College and Mother Seton Shrine	January 1, 1976 (#76000994)	Maryland Route 806; 39°41′40″N 77°19′19″W	Emmitsburg	
85	St. Paul's Episcopal Church	St. Paul's Episcopal Church	January 31, 1978 (#78001460)	North of Point of Rocks off U.S. Route 15; 39°17′13″N 77°31′46″W	Point of Rocks	
86	Saleaudo		September 24, 1979 (#79003258)	1242 New Design Road; 39°16′07″N 77°28′37″W	Adamstown	
87	Schifferstadt	Schifferstadt	July 22, 1974 (#74000952)	W. 2nd and Rosemont Sts. 39°25′24″N 77°25′39″W	Frederick	
88	Shafer's Mill	Shafer's Mill	June 26, 1986 (#86001372)	3018 Bennies Hill Rd. 39°24′40″N 77°33′54″W	Middletown	
89	Daniel Sheffer Farm		December 28, 2001 (#01001375)	8924A Mt. Tabor Rd. 39°28′39″N 77°35′43″W	Middletown	
90	Shoemaker III Village Site	Shoemaker III Village Site	September 5, 1975 (#75000893)	Address Restricted	Emmitsburg	
91	Henry Shoemaker Farmhouse	Henry Shoemaker Farmhouse	May 11, 1989 (#89000416)	2136 Old National Pike; 39°28′05″N 77°35′41″W	Middletown	
92	Henry Smeltzer Farmstead		October 14, 2010 (#10000830)	3231 Bidle Rd. 39°26′14″N 77°33′19″W	Middletown	
93	Spring Bank	Spring Bank	September 7, 1984 (#84001772)	7945 Worman's Mill Rd. 39°27′11″N 77°23′53″W	Frederick	
94	Stancioff House	Stancioff House	April 23, 1975 (#75000896)	Junction of Maryland Routes 80 and 355; 39°19′39″N 77°21′06″W	Urbana	
95	Stonebraker and Harbaugh-Shafer Building	Stonebraker and Harbaugh-Shafer Building	December 27, 2002 (#02001585)	100-104 W. Main St. 38°26′38″N 77°32′49″W	Middletown	
96	Strawberry Hill	Strawberry Hill	January 30, 1976 (#76000993)	Southeast of Creagerstown off Maryland Route 550; 39°34′16″N 77°21′14″W	Creagerstown	
97	Tipahato	Tipahato	July 19, 2001 (#01000744)	17130 Raven Rock Rd. 39°42′11″N 77°29′11″W	Cascade	
98	Turner's and Fox's Gaps Historic District	Turner's and Fox's Gaps Historic District	January 12, 2011 (#10000575)	U.S. 40-A and Reno Monument, Dahlgren, Frostown, Mt. Tabor, and Moser Rds. 39°29′02″N 77°37′06″W	Middletown	South Mountain Battlefields—September 14, 1862, MPS
99	Utica Covered Bridge	Utica Covered Bridge	June 23, 1978 (#78003174)	Utica Rd. at Fishing Creek; 39°31′28″N 77°23′46″W	Thurmont	
100	George Widrick House	George Widrick House	September 12, 1985 (#85002172)	Ballenger Creek Park; 39°22′58″N 77°27′07″W	Frederick	
101	George Willard House	George Willard House	July 22, 1993 (#93000665)	4804 Old Middletown Rd. 39°21′54″N 77°32′23″W	Jefferson	
102	James K.P. Wolfe House	James K.P. Wolfe House	December 27, 2002 (#02001582)	1201 Motter Ave. 39°25′49″N 77°24′37″W	Frederick	
103	Woods Mill Farm	Woods Mill Farm	August 15, 2007 (#07000812)	11210 Cash Smith Rd. 39°32′32″N 77°18′07″W	Woodsboro	
104	Woodsboro and Frederick Turnpike Company Tollhouse	Woodsboro and Frederick Turnpike Company Tollhouse	September 24, 1979 (#79003276)	Off Maryland Route 194; 39°28′02″N 77°21′45″W	Walkersville	

== Former listings ==
	Name on the Register	Image	Date listed	Date removed	Location	City or town	Description
1	Hanson-Thomas Houses	Hanson-Thomas Houses	January 20, 1972 (#72000579)	March 4, 1982	108 and 110 W. Patrick St.	Frederick	
2	Edgewood		September 6, 1979 (#79001129)	March 24, 2015	North of Frederick off Poole Jones Rd. 39°27′32″N 77°25′27″W	Frederick	

== See also ==
- List of National Historic Landmarks in Maryland
- National Register of Historic Places listings in Maryland
