= U.S. Route 40 Alternate (Hagerstown–Frederick, Maryland) =

Highway in Washington and Frederick counties in Maryland

U.S. Route 40 Alternate
- US 40 Alternate highlighted in red

Route information
- Auxiliary route of US 40
- Maintained by MDSHA and City of Hagerstown
- Length: 22.97 mi (36.97 km)
- Existed: 1952–present
- Tourist routes: Historic National Road; Antietam Campaign Scenic Byway

Major junctions
- West end: Potomac Street in Hagerstown
- MD 68 in Boonsboro; MD 66 in Boonsboro; MD 34 in Boonsboro; MD 67 in Boonsboro; MD 17 in Middletown; I-70 near Frederick
- East end: US 40 in Frederick

Location
- Country: United States
- State: Maryland
- Counties: Washington, Frederick

Highway system
- United States Numbered Highway System; List; Special; Divided; Maryland highway system; Interstate; US; State; Scenic Byways

U.S. Route 40 Alternate (US 40 Alternate) is an alternate route of US 40 in the U.S. state of Maryland. The highway runs 22.97 miles (36.97 km) from Potomac Street in Hagerstown east to US 40 in Frederick. US 40 Alternate parallels US 40 and much of Interstate 70 (I-70) to the south through eastern Washington County and western Frederick County. The alternate route connects Hagerstown and Frederick with Funkstown, Boonsboro, Middletown, and Braddock Heights. US 40 Alternate crosses two major north–south components of the Blue Ridge Mountains that separate the Great Appalachian Valley and the Piedmont: South Mountain between Boonsboro and Middletown and Catoctin Mountain, which is locally known as Braddock Mountain, at Braddock Heights.

US 40 Alternate is the old alignment of US 40. The highway's path was blazed in the mid-18th century to connect the Hagerstown Valley and Shenandoah Valley with eastern Pennsylvania and central Maryland. In the early 19th century, US 40 Alternate's path was improved as part of a series of turnpikes to connect Baltimore with the eastern terminus of the National Road in Cumberland. The highway was improved as one of the original state roads in the early 1910s and designated US 40 in the late 1920s. Construction on a relocated US 40 between Hagerstown and Frederick with improved crossings of South Mountain and Braddock Mountain began in the mid-1930s; the new highway was completed in the late 1940s. US 40 Alternate was assigned to the old route of US 40 in the early 1950s.

== Route description ==
US 40 Alternate is a part of the National Highway System as a principal arterial from Edgewood Drive in Funkstown to its underpass of I-70 south of Funkstown and from Old Hagerstown Road near Middletown to US 40 in Frederick.

=== Hagerstown to South Mountain ===
US 40 Alternate begins as Baltimore Street at its intersection with one-way southbound Potomac Street within the Hagerstown Historic District on the southern edge of downtown Hagerstown. Baltimore Street, which continues west as a city street toward the Hagerstown City Park, runs east–west two blocks south of US 40, which comprises a one-way pair of Washington Street eastbound and Franklin Street westbound. After heading east for two blocks, during which US 40 Alternate intersects one-way northbound Locust Street, the municipally-maintained alternate route turns southeast onto Frederick Street at a five-way junction that also includes north–south Mulberry Street. US 40 Alternate intersects Memorial Boulevard, which heads east past the former site of Municipal Stadium. The highway meets a CSX rail spur at grade while passing through an industrial area that extends to the southern city limits of Hagerstown at Kenly Avenue.

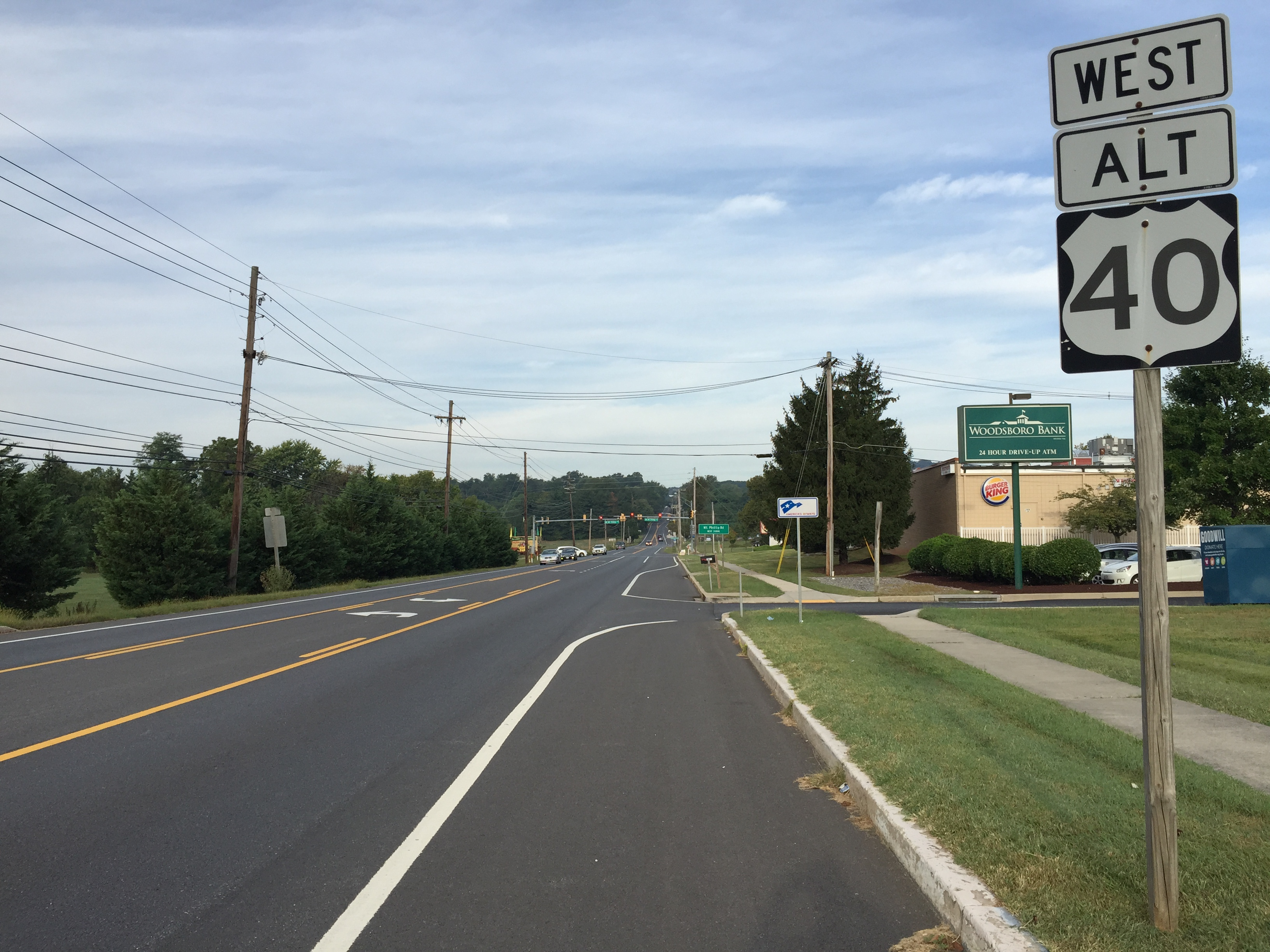
View west at the east end of US 40 Alt. at US 40 in Frederick

US 40 Alternate continues southeast as a state-maintained highway that passes the historic home Garden Hill and crosses Antietam Creek into Funkstown, where the highway's name changes to Westside Avenue. Within the Funkstown Historic District, the alternate route turns east onto Baltimore Street, then southeast onto Frederick Street. At the southern town limits of Funkstown, US 40 Alternate becomes Boonsboro Pike, which passes through farmland as it parallels Antietam Creek. The highway passes under I-70 (Eisenhower Memorial Highway) with no access and intersects Poffenberger Road, which leads west to the historic home Valentia. The highway veers away from Antietam Creek just past the historic Cool Hollow House. It then passes through the hamlet of Benevola and traverses Landis Spring Branch and Beaver Creek on its way to Boonsboro.

US 40 Alternate enters the town of Boonsboro and its name changes to Main Street at its intersection with Maryland Route 68 (MD 68) (Lappans Road). The highway meets the south end of MD 66 (Maple Avenue) next to the Bowman House and the east end of MD 34 (Potomac Street) in the center of town. US 40 Alternate leaves the town of Boonsboro after its roundabout with MD 67 (Rohrersville Road). The alternate route continues southeast as Boonsboro Pike and starts to ascend South Mountain. At the summit, known as Turner's Gap, US 40 Alternate intersects Washington Monument Road, which leads north to Washington Monument State Park, and passes the Dahlgren Chapel and the Old South Mountain Inn.

=== South Mountain to Frederick ===
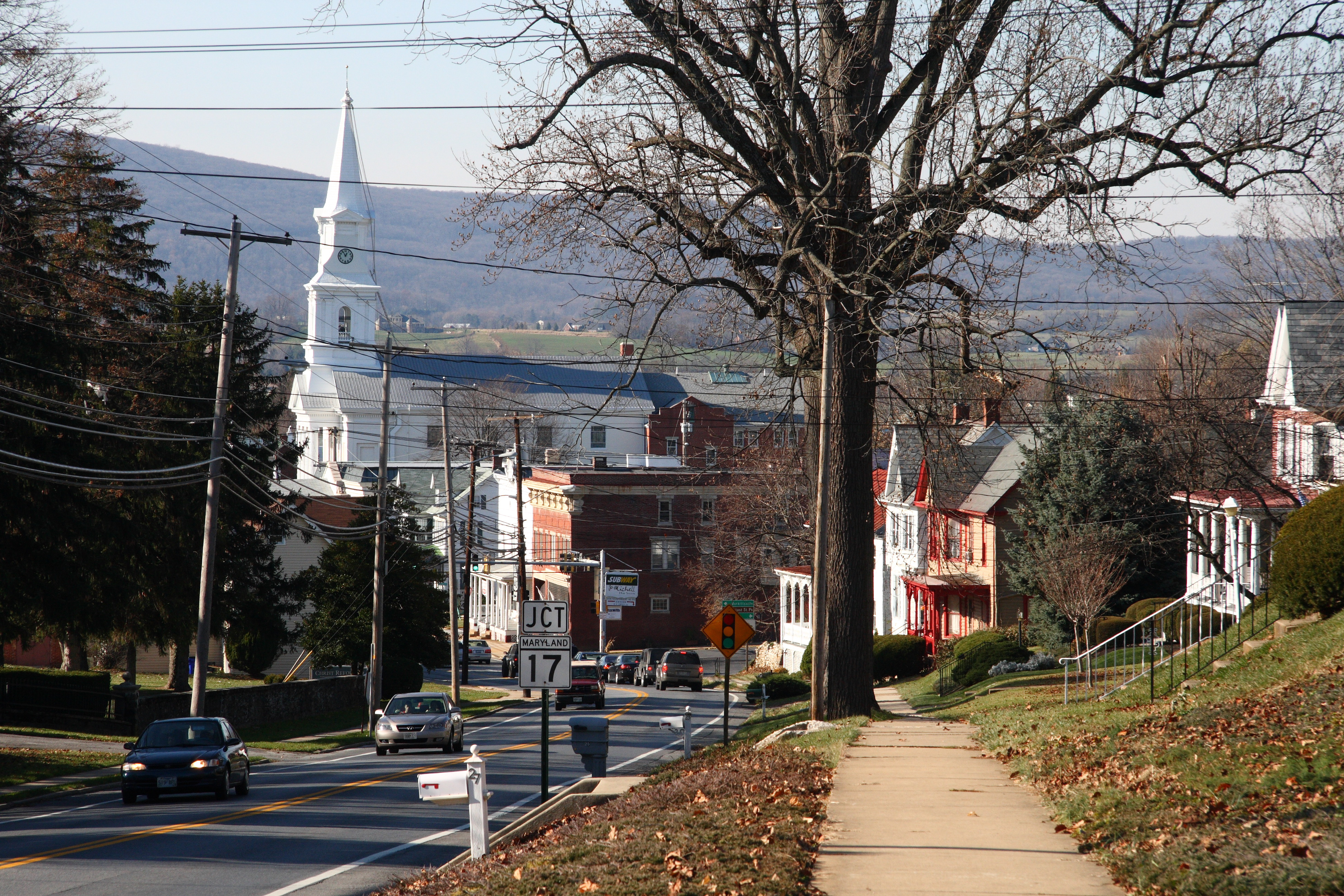
US 40 Alternate westbound approaching MD 17 in Middletown, with South Mountain in the background

US 40 Alternate's name changes to Old National Pike as it intersects the Appalachian Trail at the Washington–Frederick county line and begins its curvaceous descent of South Mountain into the Middletown Valley. In the western part of the valley, the highway passes the Henry Shoemaker Farmhouse and intersects Mount Tabor Road, which parallels South Mountain north past the historic Daniel Sheffer Farm and Routzahn-Miller Farmstead. In Spoolsville, US 40 Alternate crosses Catoctin Creek and meets Old Hagerstown Road, which passes the Bowlus Mill House. The alternate route's name becomes Main Street as it heads east through Middletown. US 40 Alternate passes the Stonebraker and Harbaugh-Shafer Building and intersects MD 17 (Church Street) within the Middletown Historic District. The highway passes through the Airview Historic District before leaving the town limits.

East of Middletown, US 40 Alternate passes through a suburban area then begins to ascend Braddock Mountain. The highway gains a climbing lane eastbound to the top of the mountain, which contains the community of Braddock Heights. On the descent of Braddock Mountain, US 40 Alternate expands to a four-lane road, with one lane eastbound, two lanes westbound, and a center turn lane. At the base of the mountain, the alternate route temporarily expands to a four-lane divided highway through its half-diamond interchange with I-70, which has ramps to and from the direction of Frederick. East of I-70, US 40 Alternate reduces to two lanes and passes the Highland Lodge. The alternate route reaches its eastern terminus at a partial intersection with US 40 (Patrick Street) at the western edge of Frederick and the Frederick Golden Mile, a heavily commercialized area east to US 15 (Frederick Freeway). There is no direct access from eastbound US 40 Alternate to westbound US 40 or from eastbound US 40 to the westbound alternate route; those movements are made by using Old Camp Road.

== History ==
=== Early paths and turnpikes ===
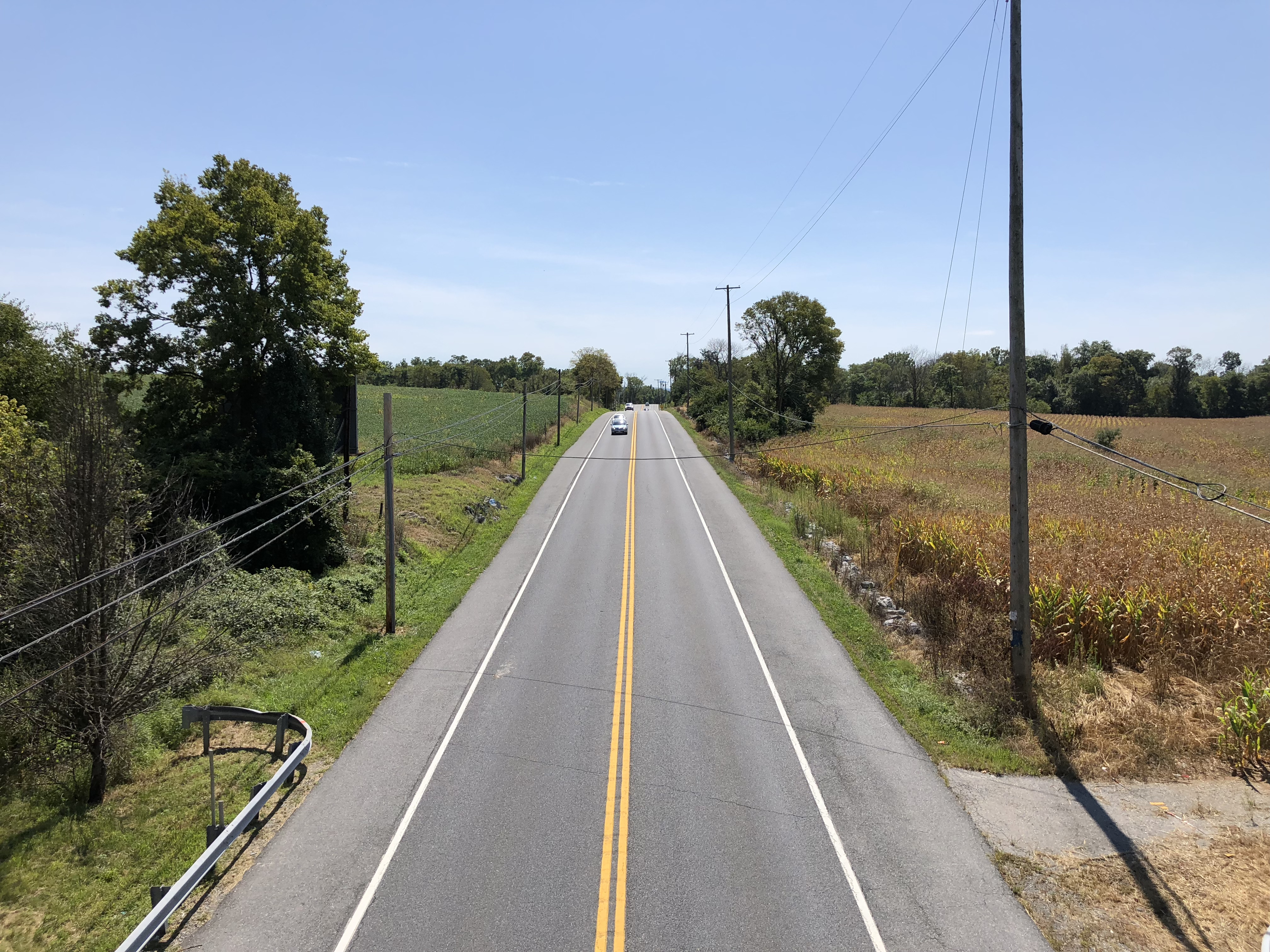
US 40 Alt eastbound just outside of Funkstown

The portion of US 40 Alternate between Frederick and Boonsboro roughly follows the Monocacy Road, a pack-horse trail blazed by settlers from Pennsylvania around 1730. The trail connected Philadelphia, Lancaster, and Hanover with Winchester, Virginia, by way of what is now Taneytown, Frederick, Boonsboro, and Williamsport. The portion of the Monocacy Road from Frederick to Williamsport was used by the Braddock Expedition on its way from Alexandria to Cumberland to commence its ill-fated assault on Fort Duquesne. Following the founding of Hagerstown in 1762, a road was laid out north from Boonsboro to connect the new town with the eastern part of the colony. While the Monocacy Road as a whole was disused by 1794, the portion followed by US 40 Alternate remained an important connection between Baltimore and Western Maryland.

The Baltimore and Fredericktown Turnpike Company was chartered in 1805 to build a road along the 62-mile (100 km) path from Baltimore to Boonsboro. This turnpike was the first step in connecting Baltimore with Cumberland, the eastern terminus of the just-commenced National Road. By 1808, the turnpike had been completed west 20 miles (32 km) from Baltimore and another 17 miles (27 km) was under construction. The Baltimore and Fredericktown Turnpike was completed in 1812. That same year, keen for an improved road to fully extend between Baltimore and Cumberland, the Maryland General Assembly conscripted the state's banks to fund turnpike companies to complete the gap between Boonsboro and Cumberland with the benefit of having their charters extended from 1816 to 1835. The banks opposed this measure but reluctantly bankrolled the construction of a road from Conocheague Creek to Cumberland between 1816 and 1818 and from Hagerstown to Conococheague Creek in 1818 and 1819. The Maryland General Assembly used their powers again in 1821, agreeing to extend the banks' charters to 1845 if they would fund a turnpike in the gap between Boonsboro and Hagerstown. When this road, the Hager's-Town and Boonsborough Turnpike (later called just the Boonsboro Turnpike), was completed in 1823, it became the first macadam road constructed in the United States, followed shortly thereafter by the National Road. The Baltimore and Fredericktown and National turnpikes remained in operation through 1909.

=== State road construction and bypass ===
In 1909, the nascent Maryland State Highway Administration (MDSRC) designated the road between Frederick and Hagerstown for improvement as one of the original state roads. The commission's first task was to acquire the necessary right-of-way by purchasing the two turnpikes in 1911. MDSRC reconstructed the road between Frederick and Hagerstown with a 14-foot (4.3 m) wide macadam surface from Frederick to Middletown and from South Mountain to Boonsboro in 1913. The state road was built from Middletown to South Mountain and from Boonsboro to Hagerstown in 1914. The portion of the highway within Boonsboro was paved in 1915. The last portion of the Frederick–Hagerstown state road to be constructed was within Funkstown, where the highway was surfaced with concrete by 1919. The highway was designated part of US 40 in 1927.

Around 1926, US 40 received its first improvement when concrete shoulders were added to expand the roadway from 14 feet (4.3 m) to 20 feet (6.1 m) in width. By 1934, MDSRC recommended widening the highway to 30 feet (9.1 m) from 5 miles (8.0 km) west of Frederick to 5 miles (8.0 km) east of Hagerstown. Ultimately, the commission decided to construct a new highway between the two cities that would shorten the distance by 1.25 miles (2.01 km) and bypass the sharp curves and limited sight distances of the old road. Grading and drainage work on the new highway began in 1936 and was completed in 1938 for the first roadway of what would ultimately become a divided highway. The first 20-foot (6.1 m) wide concrete roadway was constructed from downtown Hagerstown southeast to near Beaver Creek Road in 1938. Surfacing of the remainder of the relocated National Pike was delayed by World War II; construction resumed in 1946 and the new highway opened in 1948.

The relocated National Pike was originally designated US 40 Alternate; the old and new roads switched to their present designations in 1952. Despite the construction of a new highway, improvements continued on the original road. Trolley tracks of the Hagerstown and Frederick Railway were removed from the highway in Funkstown and the street was resurfaced in 1940. Hill climbing lanes were added for a length of 800 to 1,000 feet (240 to 300 m) on both sides of Braddock Mountain and South Mountain around 1942. The highway between Funkstown and Boonsboro had curves modified and was widened and resurfaced in 1949. US 40 Alternate from US 40 in Frederick west to Braddock Mountain underwent the same type of work in 1951 and 1952.

== Junction list ==
County	Location	mi	km	Destinations	Notes
Washington	Hagerstown	0.00	0.00	Potomac Street south / Baltimore Street west	Western terminus; Potomac Street is one-way southbound
Washington	Boonsboro	9.16	14.74	MD 68 west (Lappans Road) – Williamsport	Eastern terminus of MD 68
Washington	Boonsboro	9.75	15.69	MD 66 north (Maple Avenue) – Smithsburg	Southern terminus of MD 66
Washington	Boonsboro	10.21	16.43	MD 34 west (Potomac Street) – Sharpsburg	Eastern terminus of MD 34
Washington	Boonsboro	10.95	17.62	MD 67 south (Rohrersville Road) – Harpers Ferry	Roundabout; northern terminus of MD 67
Frederick	Middletown	17.77	28.60	MD 17 (Church Street) – Myersville, Burkittsville	
Frederick	Braddock Heights	21.60	34.76	I-70 east (Eisenhower Memorial Highway) – Baltimore, Washington	I-70 exit 49; westbound exit from and eastbound entrance to I-70
Frederick	Frederick	22.97	36.97	US 40 east (Patrick Street)	Eastern terminus; no direct access from eastbound US 40 Alternate to westbound US 40 or from eastbound US 40 to westbound US 40 Alternate
1.000 mi = 1.609 km; 1.000 km = 0.621 mi: Incomplete access

== Work cited ==
- A History of Road Building in Maryland. Baltimore: Maryland State Roads Commission. December 15, 1958.
