= MIHOP =

MIHOP may refer to:

- Model International House of Pancakes is an organization centered on the International House of Pancakes
- Maryland International House of Prayer is a para-church ministry centered in Middletown, Maryland
- "Made it happen on purpose", shorthand for the view that elements within the U.S. government itself planned the September 11 attacks of 2001
