= Shafer's Mill =

Historic house in Maryland, US

- U.S. National Register of Historic Places
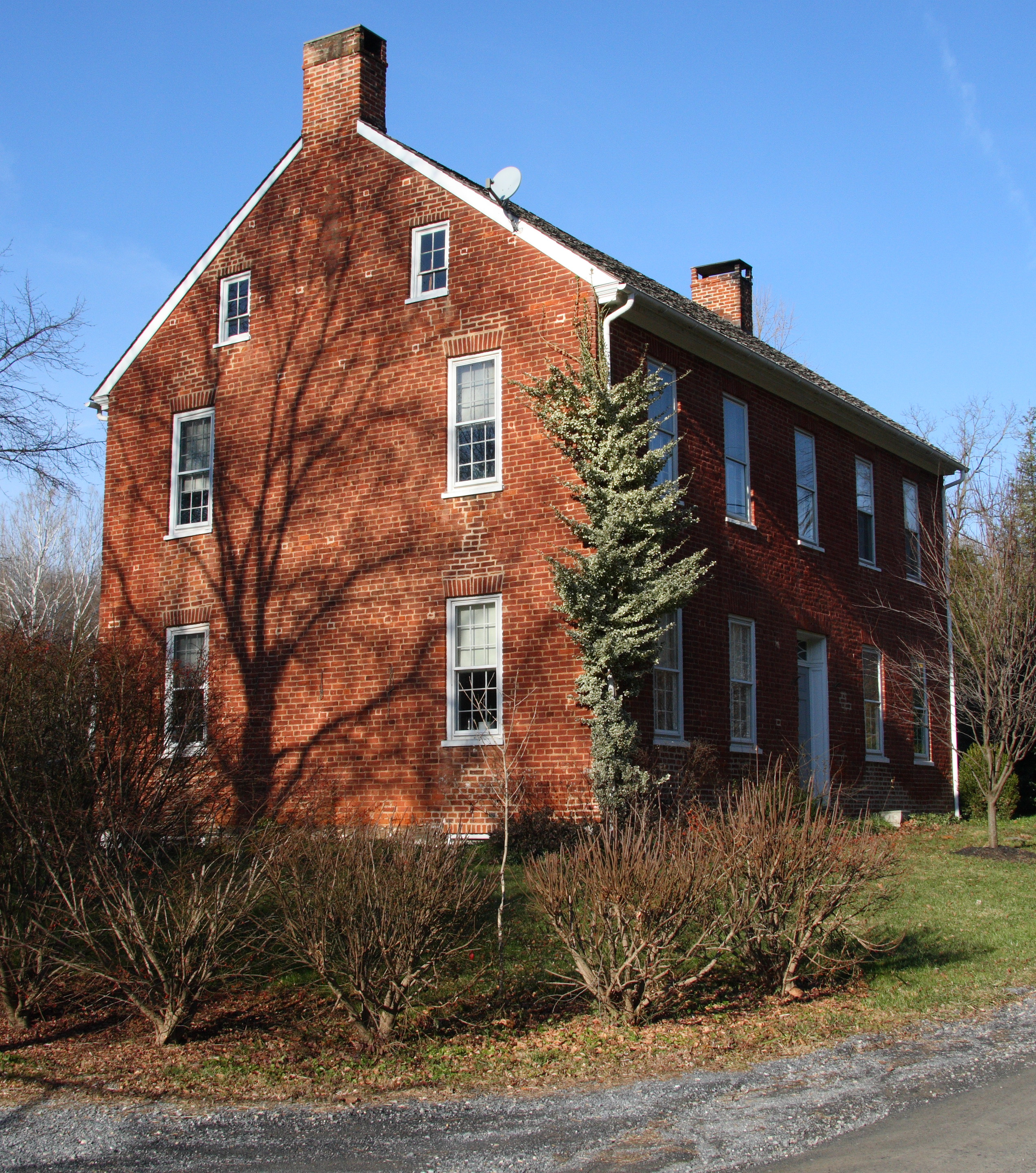

- Location within Maryland Location within the United States
- Location: 3018 Bennies Hill Rd., Middletown, Maryland
- Coordinates: 39°24′40″N 77°33′54″W
- Area: 3.1 acres (1.3 ha)
- Built: 1812
- Architectural style: Federal
- NRHP reference No.: 86001372
- Added to NRHP: June 26, 1986

Shafer's Mill is a house near Middletown, Maryland, built in the early 19th century. The Federal-style house was built for John Shafer, Jr., and was occupied after his death by his son, Peter. The Shafers operated four mills in the Middletown area. The house, however, was never operated as a mill.
