= Lawrence Everhart =

American soldier (1755–1840)

Lawrence Everhart (5 May 1755 – 2 August 1840) was a Veteran of the American Revolutionary War and Maryland Pastor. He served for the duration of the Revolutionary war and is credited with saving the life of General Gilbert du Motier, Marquis de Lafayette in the Battle of Brandywine and then Col. William Washington (a cousin of then General George Washington) at the Battle of Cowpens.

== Background ==
Lawrence's parents, Christian Eberhard (Later Anglicized to Everhart) (1729-1807) and Sybilla Geier (1731- abt. 1812) were German immigrants. Their oldest son was Lorentz Eberhard (He later used the spelling: Lawrence Everhart), born on May 5, 1755, in Heßheim in the Palatinate. Today the area is known as Heßheim, Rhein-Pfalz-Kreis, in Rhineland-Palatinate, Germany. (Birth Registered in local German Church Book. Christian Eberhard and his family migrated to The United States in 1764 on the ship, The Britannia.
Only Christian Eberhard is listed on the passengers list. This is because passenger lists before 1820 included only: Name, Departure information and Arrival details.The names of wives and children were often not included on the ships roaster because the wife and children could gain citizenship under husband/father, this was called “Derivative Citizenship”
Lawrence would have been about 8 or 9 years old at the time of their migration. They docked in Philadelphia, Pennsylvania and stayed there for a time before moving on.

== Service in the Revolutionary War ==
Following the Declaration of Independence, Lawrence enlisted with the militia, The Flying Camp, headed by Capt. Jacob Goode as a private on August 1, 1776, at Taneytown, Maryland. The next day the company marched to Annapolis, Maryland and then to Philadelphia, Pennsylvania for training. Lawrence was then reassigned to General Beall in New York. His first battle was at White Plains, New York. The battle resulted in a disastrous defeat for the American forces.

Lawrence's company retreated to Ft. Washington, but after reaching the Fort, Lawrence was taken prisoner along with the other troops. He, along with several others, later escaped from the British guards and fled to Ft. Lee. After Ft. Lee he was transferred to Hackensack, New Jersey. There he met with General George Washington. The General was extremely upset with the lack of trained soldiers and supplies provided by the Continental Congress and Lawrence later remembered that "Washington was to the point of tears".

Lawrence was discharged from The Flying Camp in 1777 because he had served his required enlisted time. But he returned to regiment and remained with the officers to give assistance to them. He returned to his home in [Frederick County, Maryland] during harvest time of 1778. He reenlisted at the rank of sergeant under Captain Swan with the cavalry regiment commanded by Lieutenant Colonel William Washington in Fredericktown, Maryland. In March 1947[needs editing], his regiment marched through Fredericksburg to Petersburg with Lt. Col. Washington. During this time, he served as aide to Col. Washington. In April 1780, his cavalry regiment was stationed in Charlestown, South Carolina. His regiment engaged in skirmishes with the British led by Lieutenant Colonel Banastre Tarleton at Stony Church, Monks Corner, and Rugley's Mill. Ongoing skirmishes between Lt. Col. Tarleton and American General Daniel Morgan's patriot forces finally culminated in the Battle of Cowpens. Lawrence was wounded in the battle and taken prisoner by British forces. As a captive, Lawrence famously expressed his wish to a nearby officer that he "hoped to God that it would be another Tarleton defeat". The British officer replied, " I am Colonel Tarleton, Sir!" And his retort being, "and I am Sgt. Everhart!"

The conditions regarding Lawrence's release either by escape or prisoner exchange remain obscure. However, it is known that he went on to Guliford Courthouse for medical care. Lawrence was later sent to Yorktown, Virginia and had the opportunity to meet the Marquis de Lafayette.

Lawrence returned to his family home in Middletown, Maryland at the end of October. Within the next month he received a letter from Colonel Bayler to return to his former regiment to assist Bayler at Petersburg, Virginia. Before leaving he married Anna Maria "Mary Anna" Beckenbaugh, in Middletown, Maryland.

== Life After the War ==
Following his service in the war, he became ordained as a minister in the Methodist church. He married Anna Maria Beckenbaugh (Later went by Mary Ann Everhart) in April 1782 in Middletown, Frederick County, Maryland. To this union were born 10 Children, 9 of whom were listed in Sgt. Everhart's Pension : record and Will. They were

1. Wilhelm "William" Everhart (1783-1870) married Miss Nancy Lowden on 27 April 1821 in Jefferson County, Indiana
2. Elizabeth Everhart (B: 1784) married a Mr. Jackson and moved later to Indiana.
3. Jacob Everhart (1786-1854) married Miss Elizabeth "Lizzie" Tope on 5 June 1819 in Jefferson County, Ohio.
4. Mary Everhart (B: 1788)
5. Nancy Everhart (B: 1790)
6. Anna Margaret Everhart (1790-1870) married Reverend Thomas Larkin (Anna is not mentioned in Lawrence's will but Thomas is.)
7. Reverend John C. Everhart (1791-1860) possibly married Miss Mary Jane Jaques (1800-1833)
8. Catherine Everhart (1793- Bef. June 1839) married Joseph Nickum on 7 December 1815 in Frederick County, Maryland. Joseph and Catherine moved to Jefferson County, Indiana at the same time Elizabeth and Mr. Jackson did. Catherine would die in Madison, Jefferson County, Indiana leaving 9 children behind.
9. Sarah Ann Everhart (1796-1882) married Henry R. Smeltzer in Frederick County, Maryland.
10. George Everhart (B: 1798)

In 1833, Rev. Everhart retired to his home near Middletown, Maryland where he resided until his death on 2 August 1840.
