= Henry Smeltzer Farmstead =

Historic house in Maryland, United States

- U.S. National Register of Historic Places
- Location within Maryland Location within the United States
- Nearest city: 3231 Bidle Rd., Middletown, Maryland
- Coordinates: 39°26′14″N 77°33′19″W
- Area: 20 acres (8.1 ha)
- Built: c. 1832
- Architectural style: Federal
- NRHP reference No.: 10000830
- Added to NRHP: October 14, 2010

The Henry Smeltzer Farmstead is a historic home and farm complex located near Middletown, Frederick County, Maryland, United States. It includes a two-story six-bay brick farmhouse dating to about 1832, a frame bank barn ruin, and several rusticated concrete block silos. A concrete block slaughter house, weighing house well house and holding pens complete the complex, which was associated in the early and mid-twentieth century with Main's Meats in Middletown. The house is built into the hillside as a "bank house", with its cellar above grade on the south side. The front and rear elevations feature porches across their widths.

The Henry Smeltzer Farmstead was listed on the National Register of Historic Places in 2010.
