= Bennies Hill Road Bridge =

- U.S. National Register of Historic Places
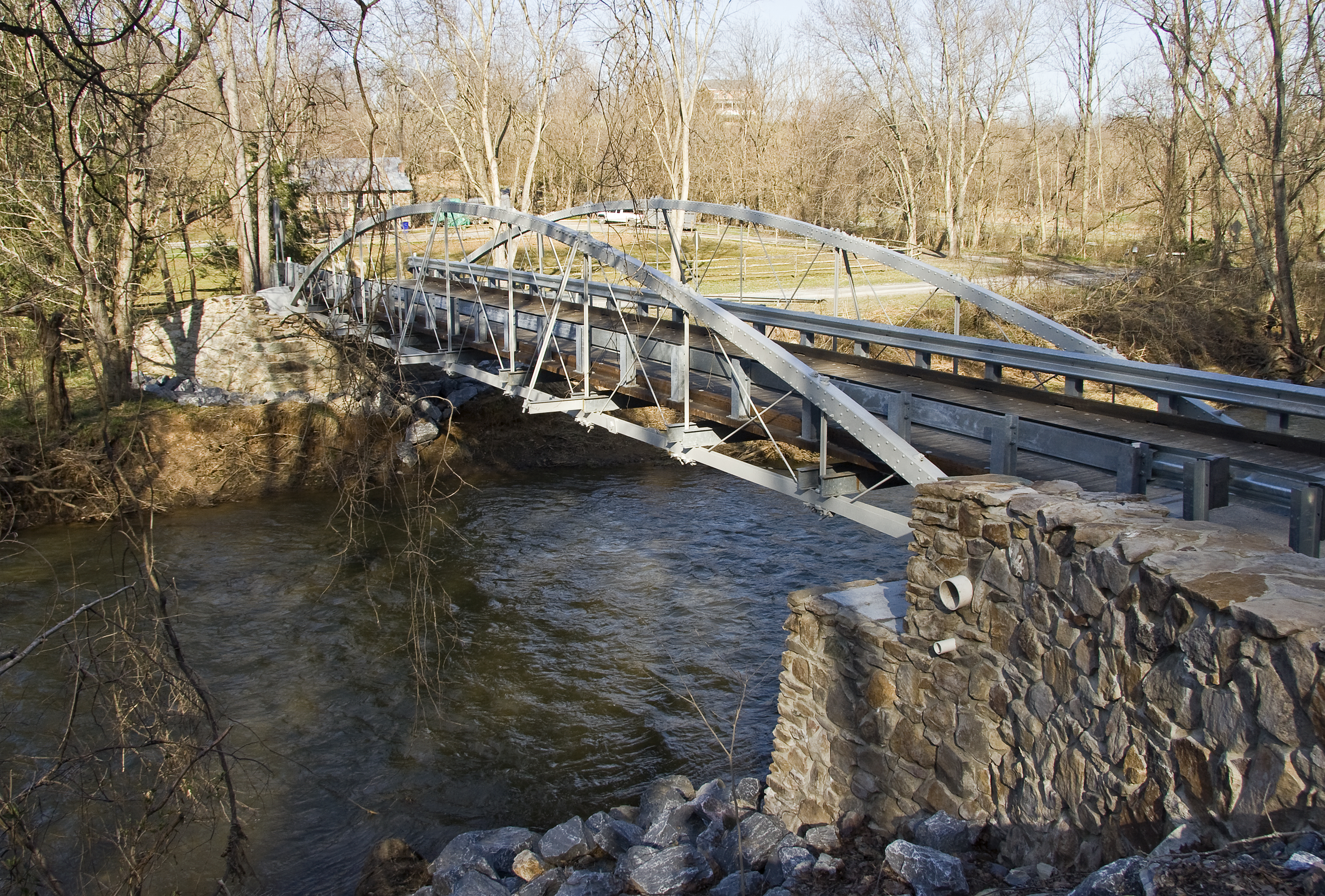
- Bennies Hill Road Bridge, March 2010

- Location within Maryland Location within the United States
- Nearest city: Middletown, Maryland
- Coordinates: 39°24′34″N 77°34′12″W
- Area: less than one acre
- Built: 1889
- Architect: King Iron Bridge Manufacturing Co.
- Architectural style: Bowstring arch truss
- NRHP reference No.: 79003265
- Added to NRHP: June 27, 1979

Bennies Hill Road Bridge is an iron bowstring arch bridge over Catoctin Creek near Middletown, Maryland, United States. It is one of two remaining bridges of its type in Maryland that remain in their original locations. The bridge was restored in 2009.
