= Ceres Bethel AME Church =

Historic church in Maryland, United States

- U.S. National Register of Historic Places
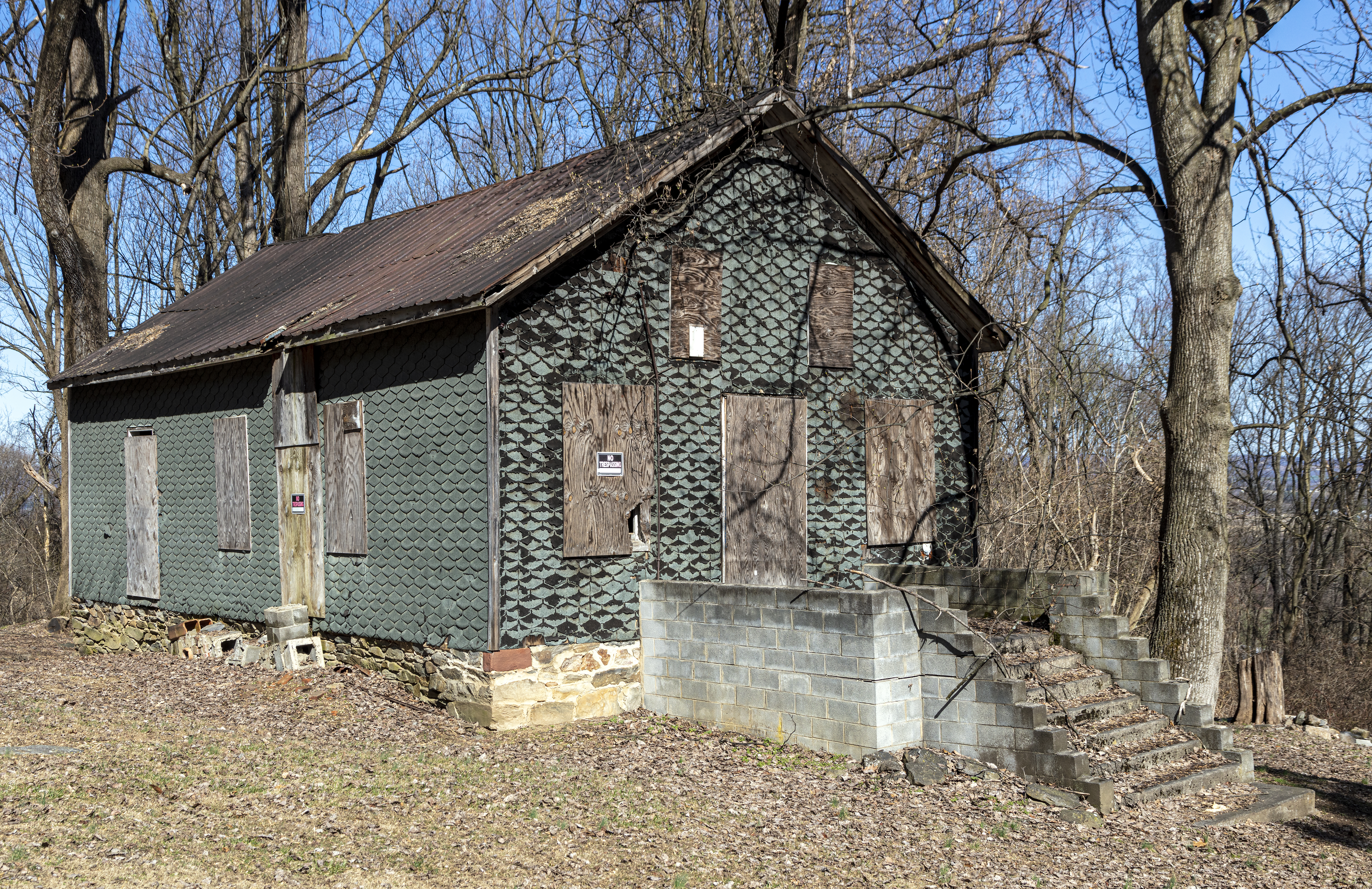
- Ceres Bethel AME Church in 2020

- Location within Maryland Location within the United States
- Location: Gapland Road, Burkittsville, Maryland
- Coordinates: 39°24′06″N 77°38′16″W
- Area: 0.75 acres (0.30 ha)
- NRHP reference No.: 100005982
- Added to NRHP: December 22, 2020

Ceres Bethel AME Church was built near Burkittsville, Maryland in 1870, for an African Methodist Episcopal Church (AME) congregation. The wood frame church fell into disuse in 1984, but its cemetery continues in use. Located at the site of the Battle of South Mountain, it has been recognized as one of Maryland's most threatened historic places.

== History ==
In the years before the American Civil War, there was a substantial population of African-American slaves and freemen in the area, working several large local farms, especially the Lee family holdings. There had been an AME church in the Burkittsville area since about 1838 or 1839. In 1858 the congregation's trustees bought a 1.25-acre (0.51 ha) parcel on the mountainside above Burkittsville for $16.50. A church is believed to have been erected on the site shortly after, and Daniel Ridout was assigned to the congregation as pastor, together with others on his circuit.

Ridout and his family lived at the base of the mountain. In 1862 the area was occupied by Confederate forces in the days leading up to the Battle of South Mountain, and the Ridout family was treated with both courtesy and disrespect by the soldiers. The battle was fought over the mountainside on September 14, 1862, and the Ridout family observed many dead soldiers from both sides. Following the Battle of Antietam two days later, the church was used as a hospital. Several Confederate dead were buried near the church, later to be re-interred in Hagerstown and Frederick.

Following emancipation, a small community grew on the mountainside near the church. In 1870 the present church was built, and the former church building was converted to a school. The school building has since disappeared.

The congregation dwindled in the middle of the 20th century. In 1984 the church closed, and the congregation moved to the AME church in Knoxville, Maryland. Preservation efforts came to naught, and the church deteriorated.

After its abandonment, the church has experienced vandalism from fans of the 1999 Blair Witch Project movie.The church was subsequently listed in 2011 as one of the eleven most endangered historic sites in Maryland, by Preservation Maryland

== Description ==
The church is on a steeply sloping site on the east side of South Mountain at Crampton's Gap, above Burkittsville, Maryland. The building is a simple gable-front wood-framed structure with a single room, over a stone-foundation basement. It is approached by a south-facing stairway. Double front doors are flanked by six-over-six wood double-hung sash windows, with two arched fixed windows above. The original vertical wood siding is covered by diamond-pattern asphalt shingles. The side elevations are three bays, and at the rear there are two double-hung windows flanking a raised altar podium. A stair on the left of the altar gives access to the basement. The basement has two windows and a door on the east side, where the ground falls away.

A marble cornerstone is inscribed "CERES BETHEL A.M.E. CHURCH 1870. L. Benson. Pastor.

The cemetery contains at least 52 marked graves and an undetermined number of unmarked gravesites.

The church is boarded up and continues to deteriorate. Local preservation organizations have undertaken cleanups of the cemetery.

== Significance ==
The church and graveyard preserve the memory of the African-American community in the area, which survived from the pre-Civil War era to the mid-20th century. The church and cemetery were placed on the National Register of Historic Places on December 22, 2020.
