= Rosenstock Village site =

- Rosenstock Village Site
- U.S. National Register of Historic Places
- Location: Address restricted
- Nearest city: Frederick, Maryland
- NRHP reference No.: 100002308
- Added to NRHP: April 16, 2018

The Rosenstock Village Site is a historic site located in Frederick County, Maryland, United States, near the city of Frederick. It contains the remains of a Late Woodland village situated on a bluff overlooking the Monocacy River. The village was occupied between A.D. 1335 and A.D. 1400, based on artifact analysis and radiocarbon dating. It is similar to the Montgomery Complex, which is a cultural complex made up of Late Woodland sites located on the Potomac River. The site was excavated in 1979 and from 1990 to 1992, and estimates suggest that 93% of the site remains undisturbed. They uncovered a large oval area surrounded by pits, a large sheet midden area, and what are believed to be two sweatlodges. The excavations have yielded a trove of artifacts and animal remains. The site was listed on the National Register of Historic Places in 2018.
