= Loats Female Orphan Asylum of Frederick City =

Historic building in Maryland, United States

- U.S. National Register of Historic Places
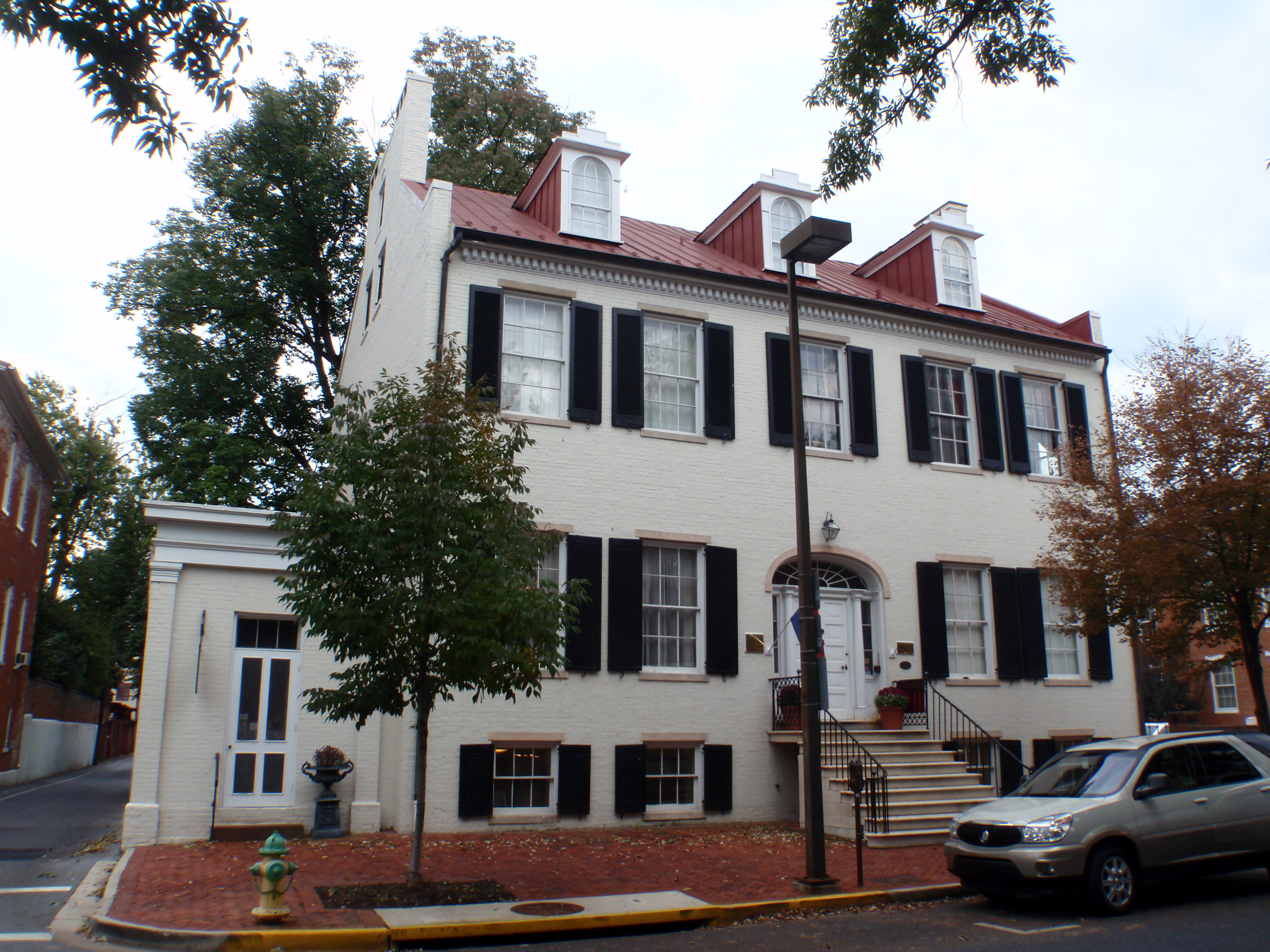

- Location within Maryland Location within the United States
- Location: 24 E. Church St., Frederick, Maryland
- Coordinates: 39°24′54″N 77°24′34″W
- Area: 1 acre (0.40 ha)
- Built: 1824
- Architectural style: Federal
- NRHP reference No.: 72000580
- Added to NRHP: October 10, 1972

Loats Female Orphan Asylum of Frederick City is a historic home and former orphanage building located at Frederick, Frederick County, Maryland.

It is an imposing 2 1/2-story Federal Flemish bond brick mansion with a sloping gable roof. The small addition on the east end of the house served as an office for the original owner, John Baltzell, M.D. (1774–1854). The house's third owner, John Loats (first president of the Frederick and Pennsylvania Line railroad, headquartered in Frederick.), established in his will of 1879, the Loats Female Orphan Asylum of Frederick City. It currently serves as headquarters to the Historical Society of Frederick County.

It was listed on the National Register of Historic Places in 1972.
