= Henry Shoemaker Farmhouse =

Historic house in Maryland, United States

- Shoemaker, Henry, Farmhouse
- U.S. National Register of Historic Places
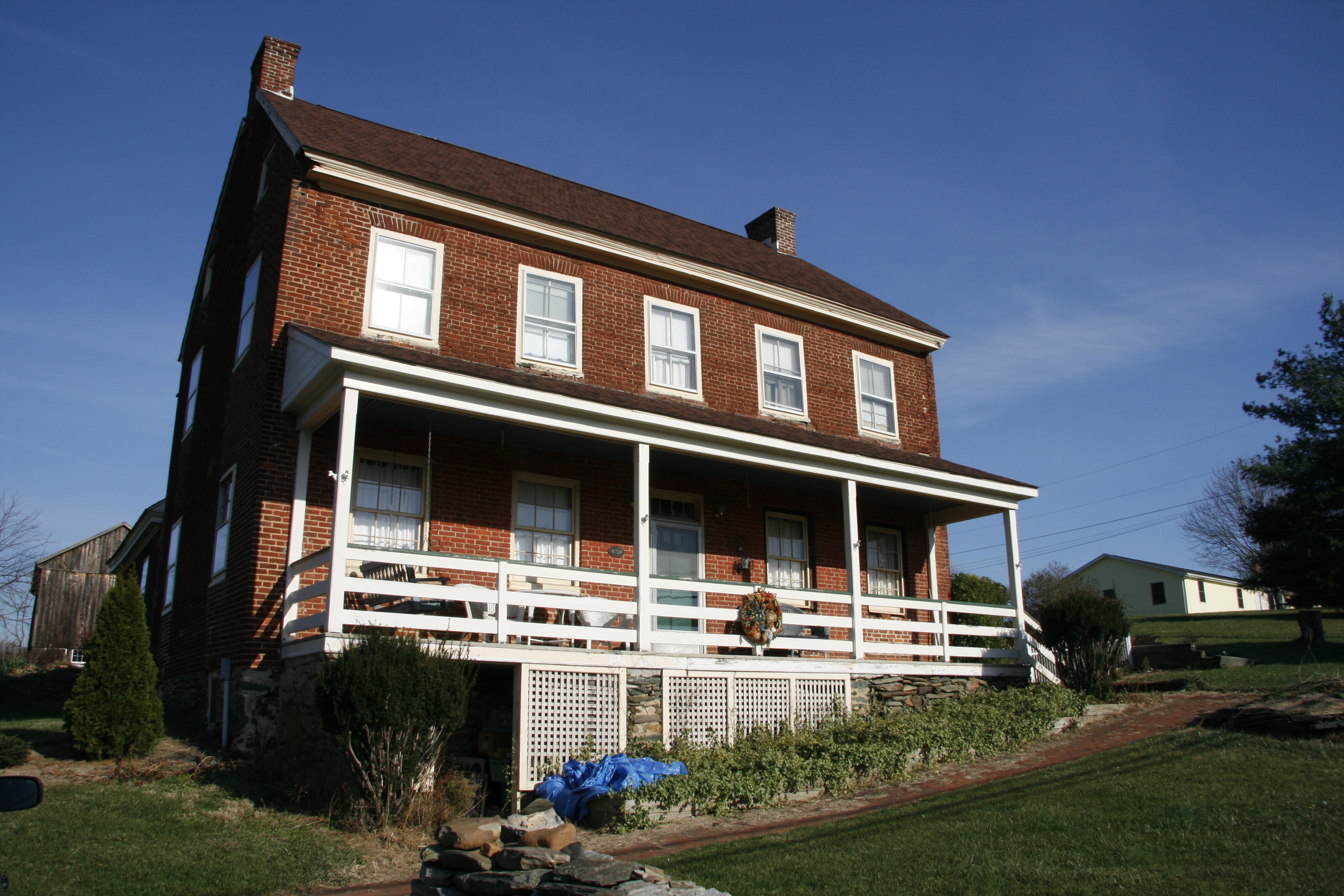

- Location within Maryland Location within the United States
- Location: 2136 Old National Pike, Middletown, Maryland
- Coordinates: 39°28′5″N 77°35′41″W
- Area: 1.6 acres (0.65 ha)
- Built: 1810
- Architectural style: Federal
- NRHP reference No.: 89000416
- Added to NRHP: May 11, 1989

The Henry Shoemaker Farmhouse is a circa 1810 Federal style farmhouse which was involved in the Battle of South Mountain in 1862. Located near the eastern end of Turner's Gap, the house was the center of a Union encampment and served as a field hospital.

The Henry Shoemaker Farmhouse was listed on the National Register of Historic Places in 1989.
