= Biggs Ford Site =

Coordinates: 39°28′40″N 77°23′2″W

- U.S. National Register of Historic Places
- Location within Maryland Location within the United States
- Nearest city: Frederick, Maryland
- Area: 16 acres (6.5 ha)
- NRHP reference No.: 75000894
- Added to NRHP: June 10, 1975

Biggs Ford Site is an archaeological site near Frederick in Frederick County, Maryland. It is one of the few known, large late prehistoric Native American village sites near the Monocacy River. The site dates from the Middle to Late Woodland period.

It was listed on the National Register of Historic Places in 1975.
