= John Eyler Farmstead =

Historic house in Maryland, United States

- U.S. National Register of Historic Places
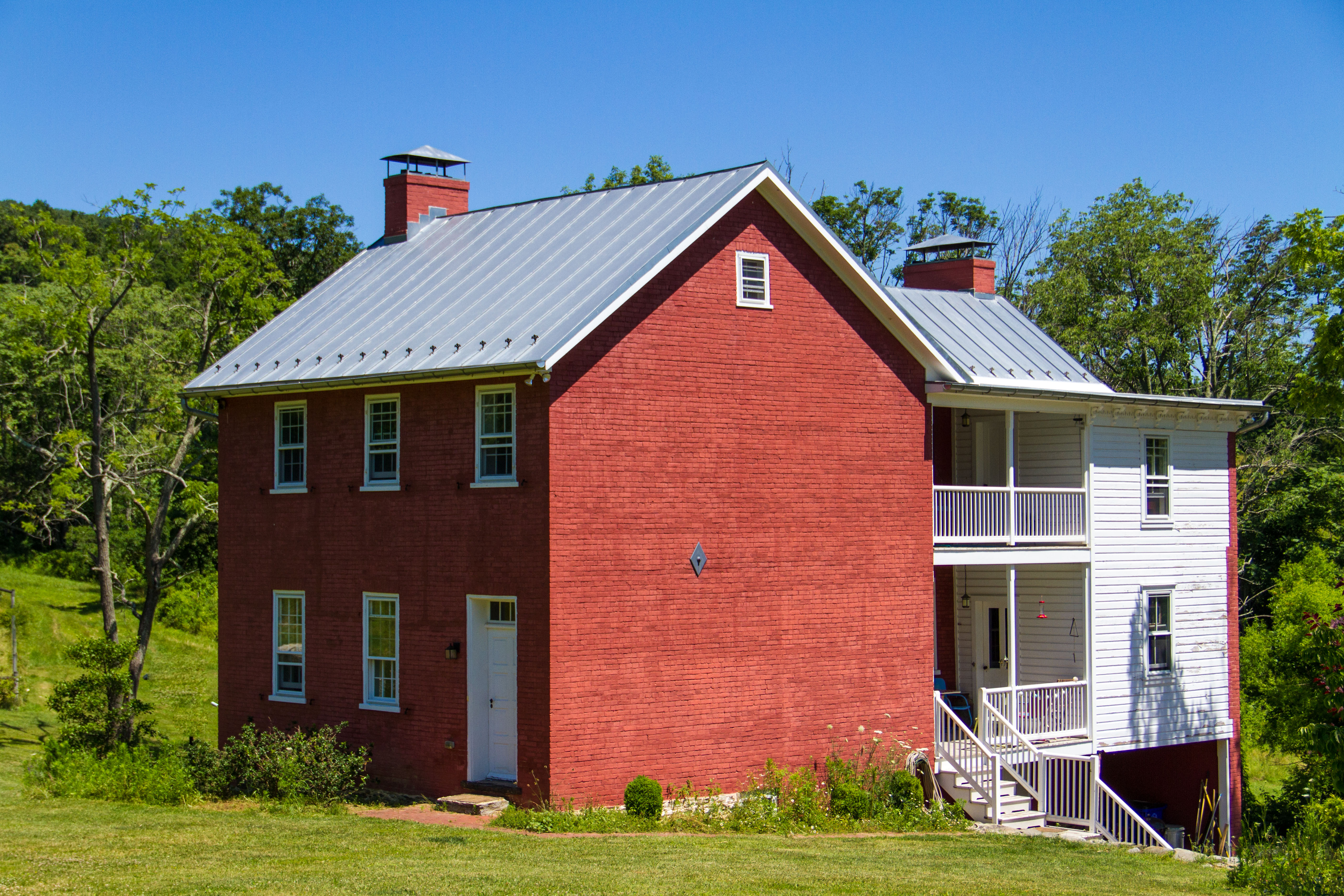

- Location within Maryland Location within the United States
- Location: 7216 Eyler Valley Flint Road, Thurmont, Maryland
- Coordinates: 39°40′40″N 77°25′1″W
- Area: 50 acres (20 ha)
- Architectural style: Federal
- NRHP reference No.: 06000817
- Added to NRHP: September 13, 2006

The John Eyler Farmstead is a historic home and farm complex located at Thurmont, Frederick County, Maryland, United States. It includes a two-story, side-passage Flemish bond brick farmhouse with a rear wing built about 1820, a stone springhouse ruin, and a brick silo.

The John Eyler Farmstead was listed on the National Register of Historic Places in 2006.
