= Middletown Historic District (Middletown, Maryland) =

Historic district in Maryland, United States

- U.S. National Register of Historic Places
- U.S. Historic district
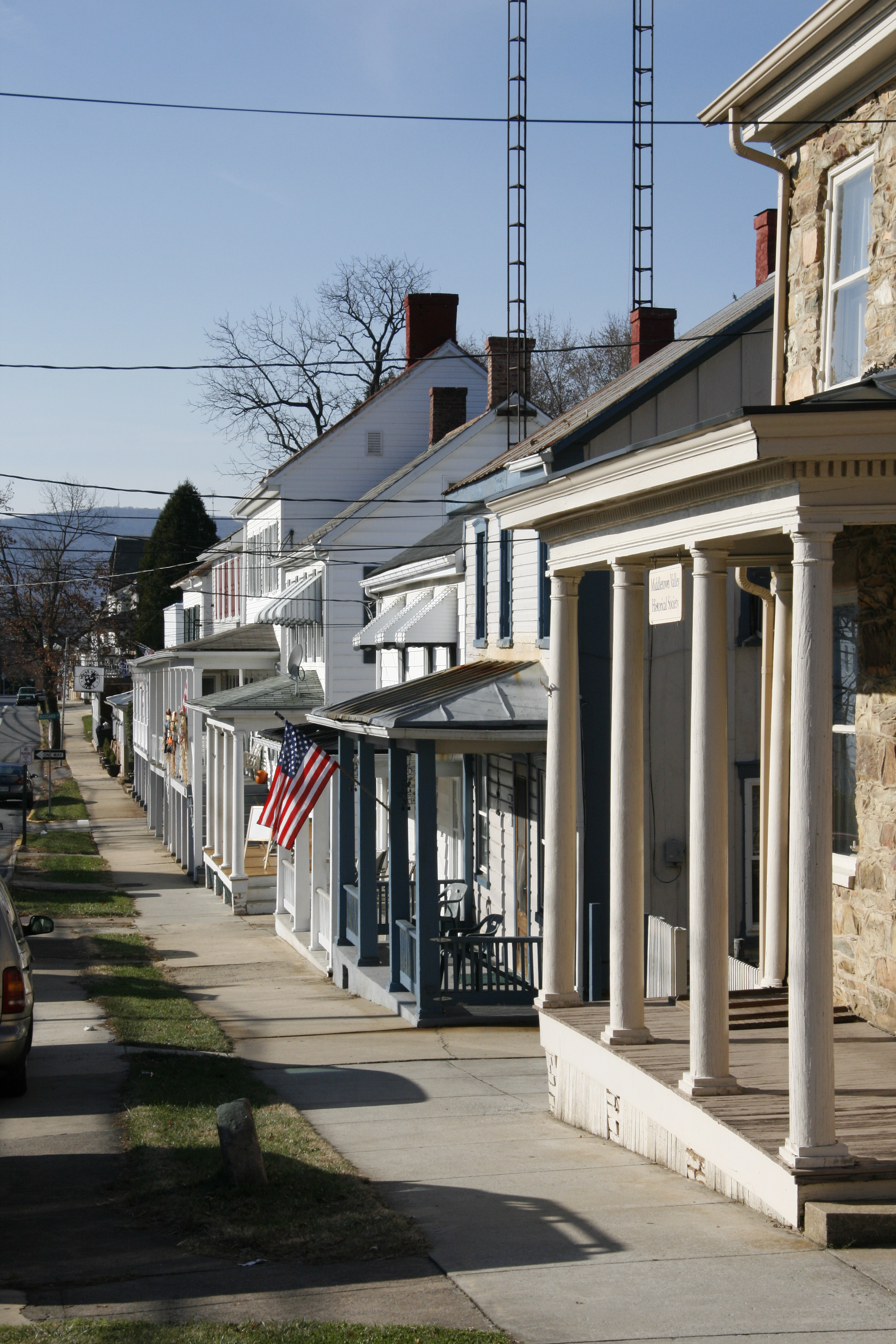
- West Main Street in the Middletown Historic District

- Location within Maryland Location within the United States
- Location: Including E. and W. Main St., Green St., Washington St., Jefferson St., Church St., and Walnut St., Middletown, Maryland
- Coordinates: 39°26′41″N 77°32′38″W
- Area: 130 acres (53 ha)
- Built: 1806
- Architectural style: Late Victorian, Greek Revival, Federal
- NRHP reference No.: 03001334
- Added to NRHP: December 24, 2003

The Middletown Historic District comprises the historic civic and commercial core of Middletown, Maryland. Established in the late 18th century along the historic National Pike, the community developed into the primary economic and social hub of the fertile Middletown Valley. It retained this regional prominence well into the 20th century.

The historic district encompasses a dense concentration of remarkably well-preserved commercial, residential, and ecclesiastical architecture dating primarily from the mid-19th to early 20th centuries. The area was officially listed on the National Register of Historic Places on December 24, 2003.

== History and development ==
Middletown's geographical position made it an essential staging point for travelers, settlers, and merchants moving westward from Frederick, Maryland, toward the Cumberland Valley. The town expanded rapidly with the formal paving of the National Road (U.S. Route 40) in the early 1800s, fueling a boom in local commerce, taverns, and residential construction.

The community maintained its status as a prosperous regional hub until the 1930s, when several economic and infrastructural shifts altered its trajectory. The rising industrial and residential influence of neighboring Frederick, coupled with the abandonment of the Hagerstown and Frederick Railway interurban trolley line, slowed local expansion. This stabilization was further cemented when a modern highway bypass was constructed on US 40, diverting heavy commercial traffic away from Main Street. Ironically, this period of economic decline shielded the town's historic core from mid-century urban renewal projects, preserving its historic layout and structural integrity.

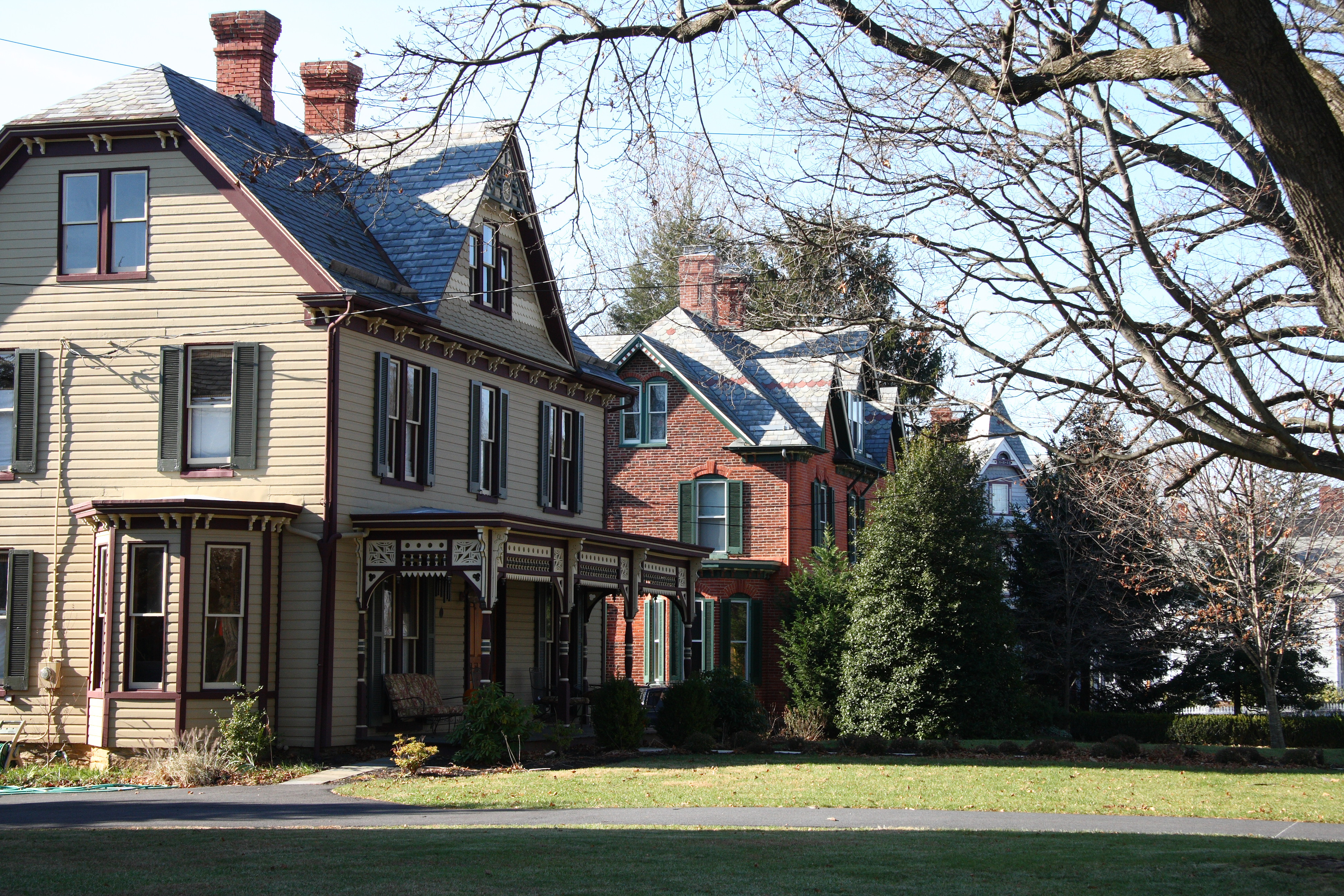
Late Victorian residential architecture lining West Main Street.

== Architectural overview ==
The 130-acre historic district showcases an architectural timeline of western Maryland's development. The oldest sections contain Federal-style brick and log structures built close to the sidewalk, mirroring early 19th-century urban planning principles. As the town grew prosperous in the mid-to-late 1800s, newer commercial brick blocks and grand residential estates adopted Greek Revival and Late Victorian designs, notably featuring intricate Queen Anne wrap-around porches and brackets.

To the eastern edge of the district, the layout transitions into a distinct early 20th-century streetcar suburb. This section is characterized by Craftsman-style bungalows and American Foursquare homes built directly along the former right-of-way of the electric trolley line.

A related area of early 20th-century development known as the Airview Historic District lies further to the east along the old National Pike corridor. Although Historically connected to Middletown's streetcar expansion, it is considered a separate listing on the National Register due to an intervening pocket of late-20th-century suburban development.

== See also ==
- Stonebraker and Harbaugh-Shafer Building
- National Register of Historic Places listings in Frederick County, Maryland
