= Stonebraker and Harbaugh–Shafer Building =

Historic house in Maryland, United States

- Stonebraker and Harbaugh--Shafer Building
- U.S. National Register of Historic Places
- U.S. Historic district – Contributing property
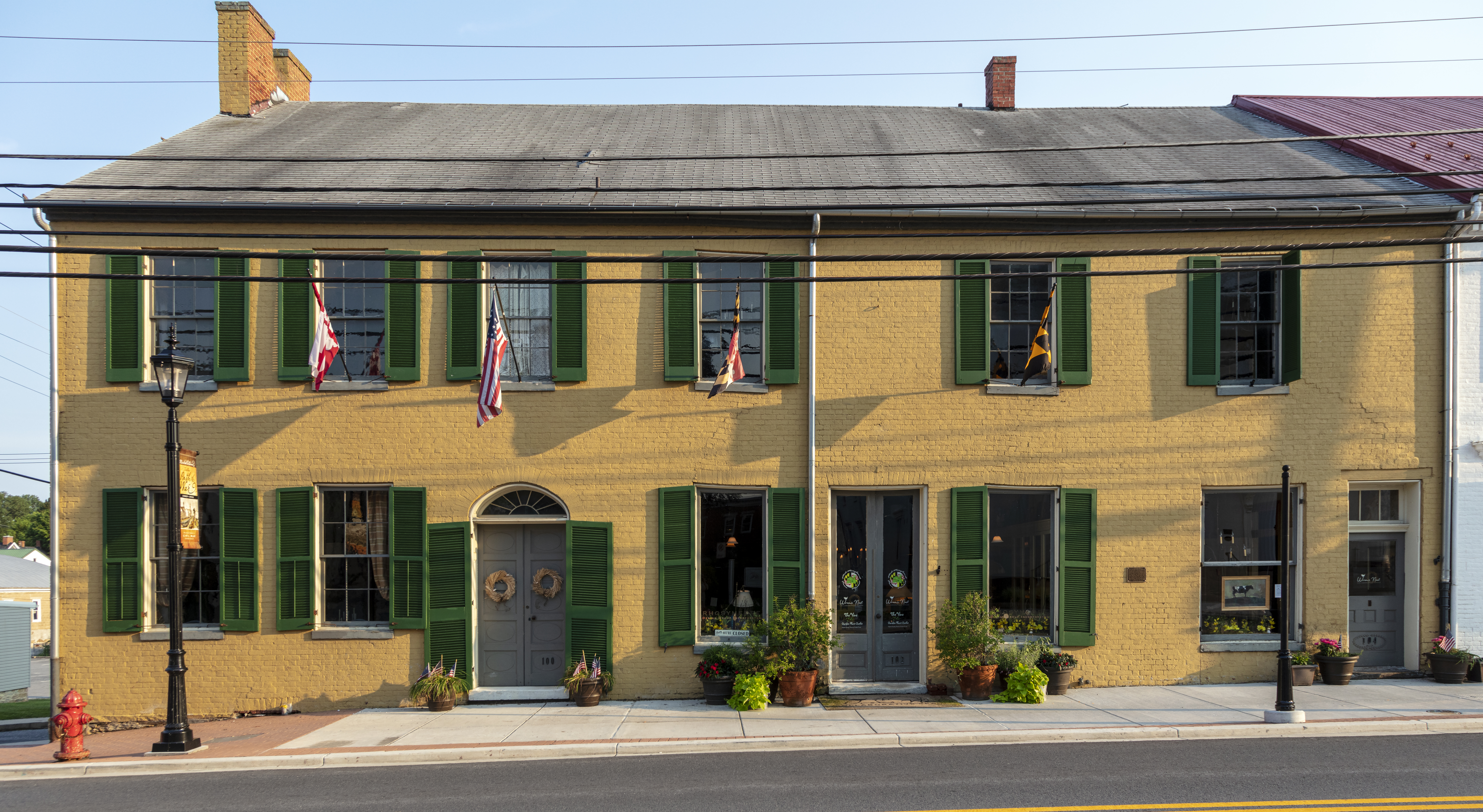
- Stonebraker and Harbaugh-Shafer Building in 2023

- Location within Maryland Location within the United States
- Location: 100-104 W. Main St., Middletown, Maryland
- Coordinates: 39°26′37.53″N 77°32′49.08″W
- Area: less than one acre
- Built: 1830
- Architectural style: Federal, Greek Revival
- NRHP reference No.: 02001585
- Added to NRHP: December 27, 2002

The Stonebraker and Harbaugh–Shafer Building in Middletown, Maryland was built circa 1830 with a residential section to the east and a commercial section to the west. The Federal-style building incorporates Greek Revival detailing in the interior.

The Stonebraker and Harbaugh–Shafer Building was listed on the National Register of Historic Places in 2002. It is included in the Middletown Historic District.
