= George Widrick House =

Historic house in Maryland, United States

- U.S. National Register of Historic Places
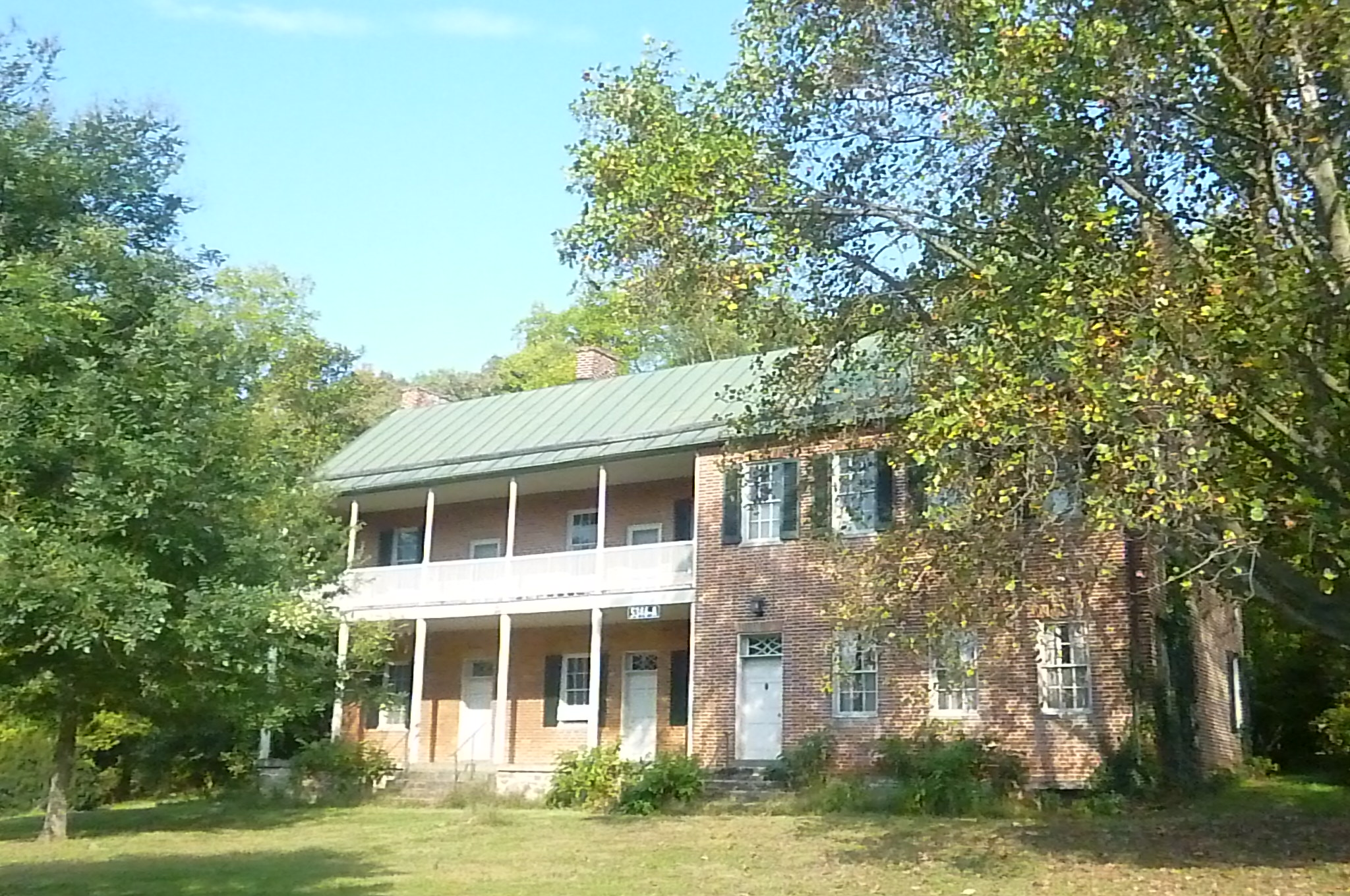

- Location within Maryland Location within the United States
- Location: Ballenger Creek Pike (MD 180), Frederick, Maryland
- Coordinates: 39°22′58″N 77°27′7″W
- Area: 8 acres (3.2 ha)
- Architectural style: Federal
- NRHP reference No.: 85002172
- Added to NRHP: September 12, 1985

The George Widrick House is a historic home located at Frederick, Frederick County, Maryland, United States. It is a 2 1/2-story Federal period brick dwelling, with a 2-story service wing. Outbuildings include a small brick smokehouse and the stone foundation of a barn.

The George Widrick House was listed on the National Register of Historic Places in 1985.
