= Shoemaker III Village Site =

- U.S. National Register of Historic Places
- Nearest city: Emmitsburg, Maryland
- NRHP reference No.: 75000893
- Added to NRHP: September 05, 1975

Shoemaker III Village Site is an archaeological site near Emmitsburg, in the extreme northern section of Frederick County, Maryland. Pottery fragments, projectile points, and other artifacts found at the site date it to 900–1300.

It was listed on the National Register of Historic Places in 1975.
