= Airview Historic District =

Historic district in Maryland, United States

- U.S. National Register of Historic Places
- U.S. Historic district
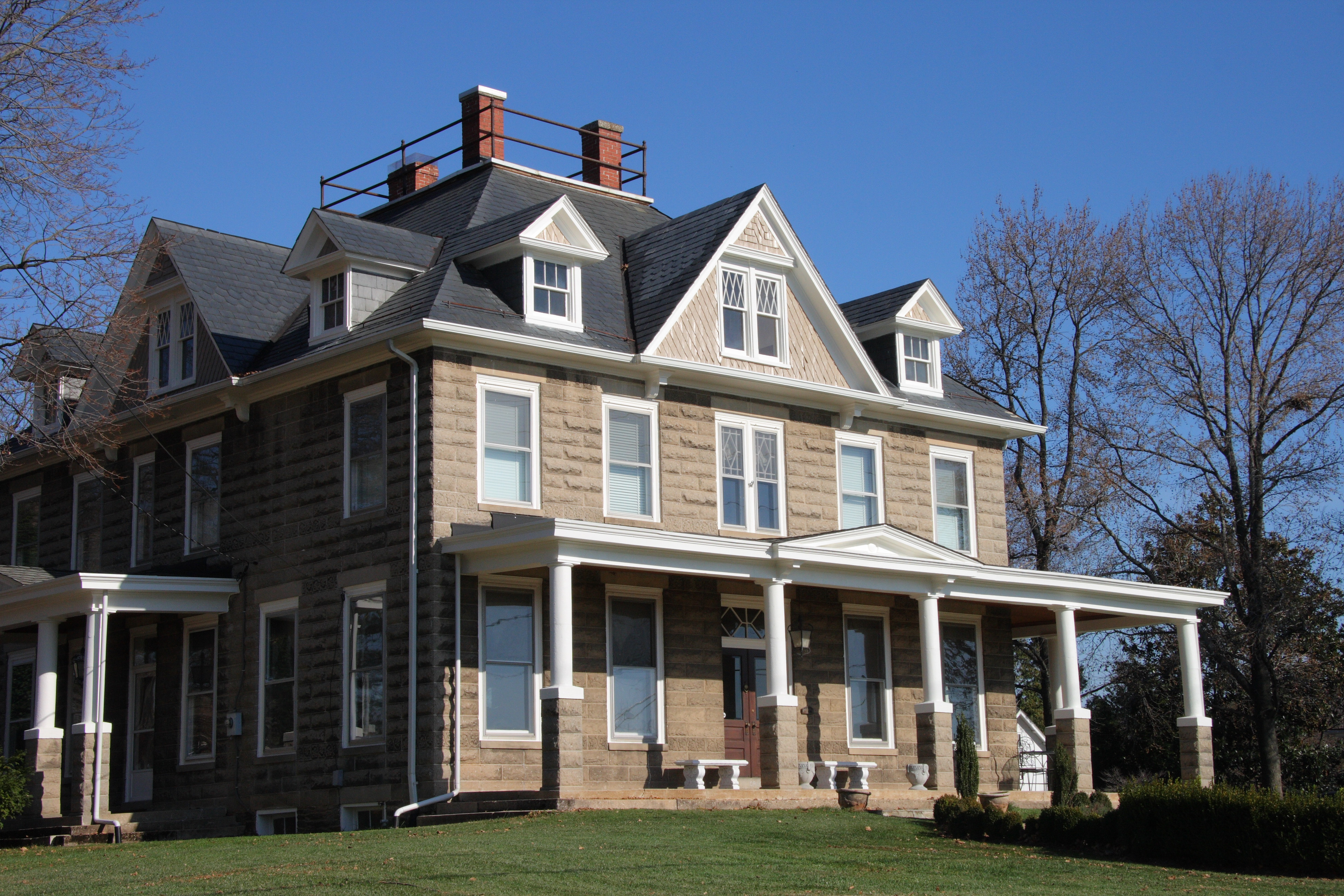

- Location within Maryland Location within the United States
- Location: 701-720 East Main St. extended, Middletown, Maryland
- Coordinates: 39°26′26″N 77°31′46″W
- Area: 10 acres (4.0 ha)
- Built: 1896
- Architect: Barber, George F. & Co.; et al.
- Architectural style: Queen Anne, Colonial Revival, et al.
- NRHP reference No.: 04001404
- Added to NRHP: December 29, 2004

The Airview Historic District is a district of 12 houses built between 1896 and 1930 on each side of East Main Street in Middletown, Maryland. The district was developed to take advantage of the Hagerstown and Frederick Railway, which paralleled what was then known as the National Pike, and is an example of a small-scale streetcar suburb. The subdivision was subdivided from the Kefauver farm and included a trolley stop in front of developer Lewis Kefauver's house. The trolley right-of-way is still visible in the deep setback between the street and the sidewalk in the front yards of houses on the north side of the street.

The subdivision's location in a then-rural setting view with its expansive views made the suburb attractive for retiring farmers.

The Airview Historic District is now part of Middletown, but is separated from the Middletown Historic District by a section of newer development.
