= Routzahn-Miller Farmstead =

Historic house in Maryland, US

- U.S. National Register of Historic Places
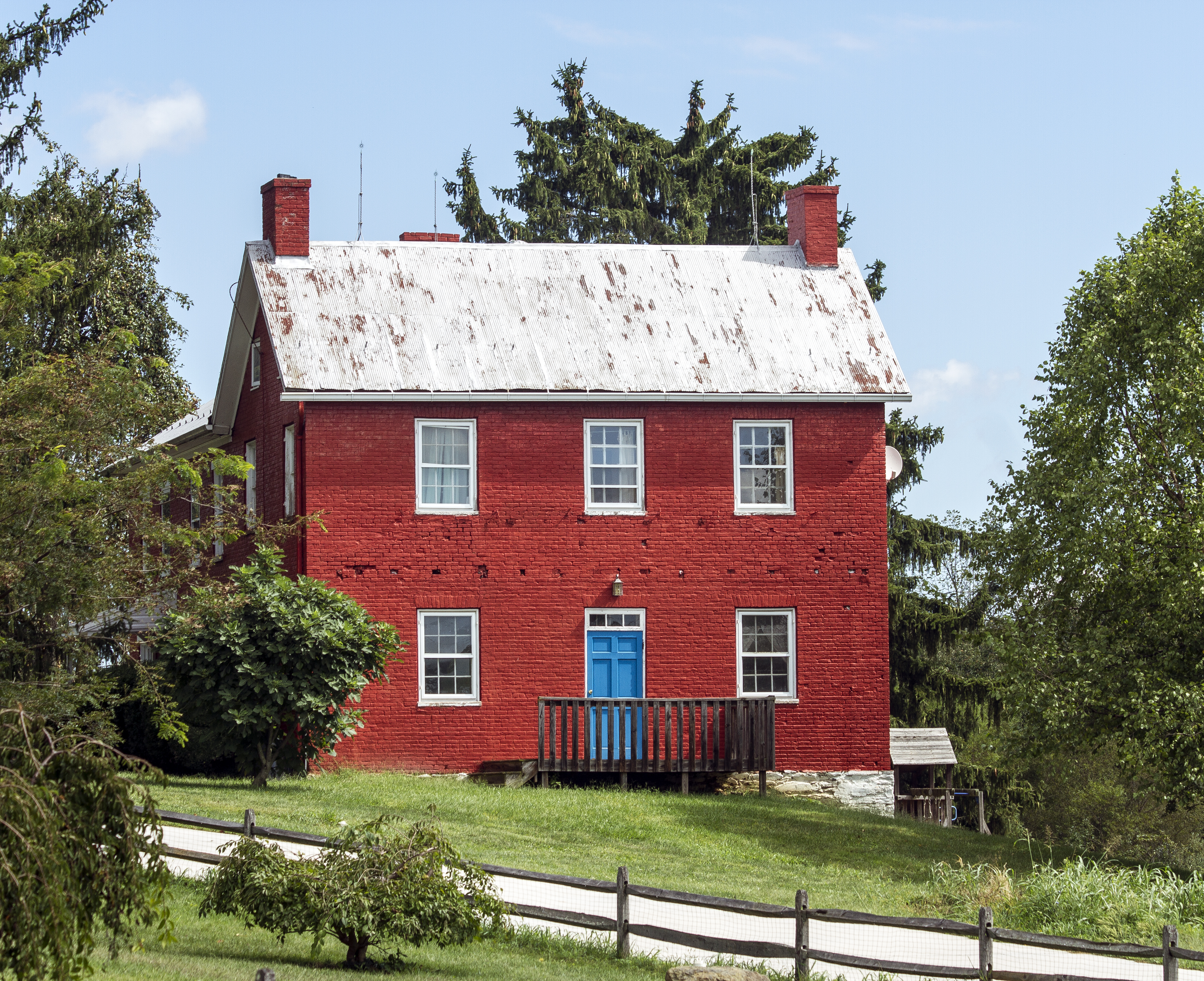
- Routzahn-Miller Farmhouse, September 2012

- Location within Maryland Location within the United States
- Location: 9117 Frostown Rd., Middletown, Maryland
- Coordinates: 39°29′9″N 77°35′28″W
- Area: 16.7 acres (6.8 ha)
- Built: 1825
- Architectural style: Federal, Greek Revival
- NRHP reference No.: 06000878
- Added to NRHP: September 27, 2006

The Routzahn-Miller Farmstead is a historic home and farm complex located at Middletown, Frederick County, Maryland, United States. It consists of a Federal style-influenced brick house and smokehouse, both built about 1825; a later frame out-kitchen / washhouse; a standard Pennsylvania barn; a 20th-century dairy barn and milk house; and a 20th-century equipment shed. The Pennsylvania barn was probably built in the late 19th century and was recently rehabilitated for use as a preschool. The complex is located on a 16.7-acre (68,000 m^{2}) parcel on the east flank of South Mountain. It is representative example of a type of domestic and agricultural grouping which characterized the rural mid-Maryland region from the early 19th century through World War II era.

The Routzahn-Miller Farmstead was listed on the National Register of Historic Places in 2006.
