= Frederick Armory =

- U.S. National Register of Historic Places
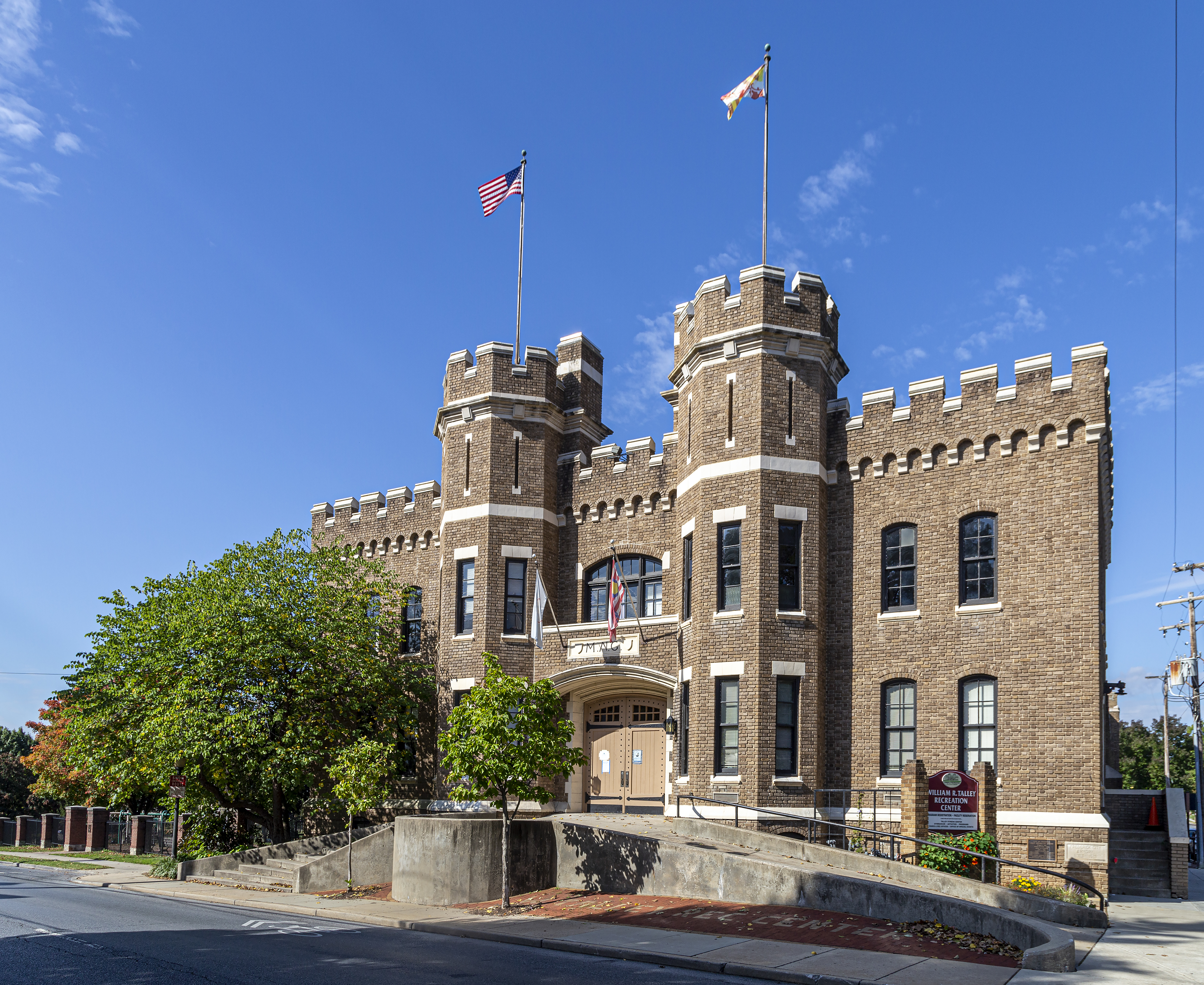
- Frederick Armory in 2020

- Location within Maryland Location within the United States
- Location: Bentz & Second Sts., Frederick, Maryland
- Coordinates: 39°25′0″N 77°24′53″W
- Area: 0.7 acres (0.28 ha)
- Built: 1913
- Architect: Hamme, John B.; Culler, Lloyd C.
- Architectural style: Medieval
- MPS: Maryland National Guard Armories TR
- NRHP reference No.: 85002672
- Added to NRHP: September 25, 1985

The Frederick Armory is one of a series of similar armories built for the Maryland National Guard in the early 20th century. The building explicitly copies features of medieval fortifications, with crenelated blocks at either end of a buttressed drill hall.

It was listed on the National Register of Historic Places in 1985.

The armory is now a city recreation center.
