= Rich Mountain (Frederick, Maryland) =

Historic house in Maryland, United States

- U.S. National Register of Historic Places
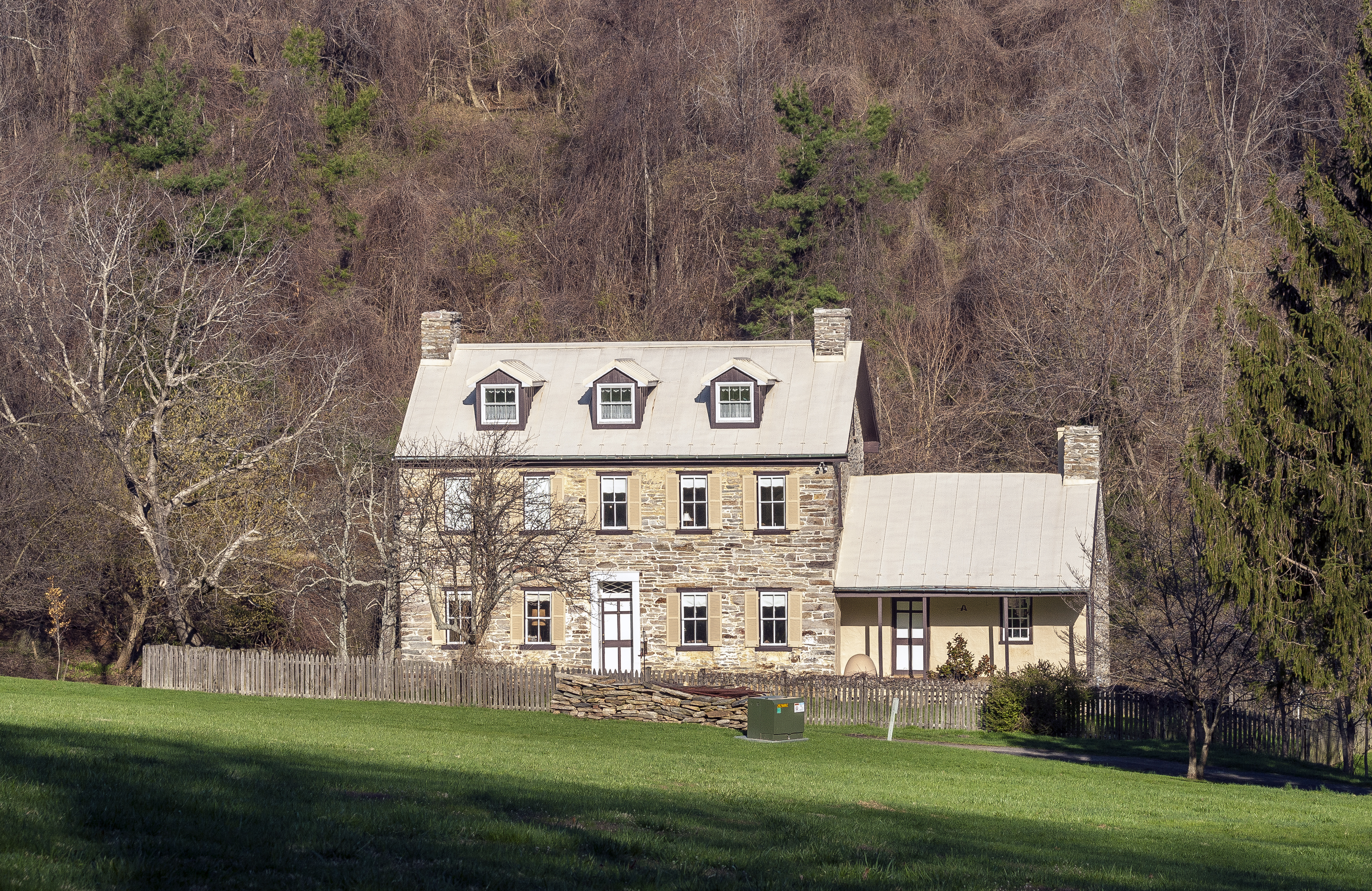

- Location within Maryland Location within the United States
- Location: 6434 S. Clifton Rd., Frederick, Maryland
- Coordinates: 39°24′40″N 77°30′14.5″W
- Area: less than one acre
- Built: 1810
- Architectural style: Federal
- NRHP reference No.: 05001480
- Added to NRHP: December 28, 2005

Rich Mountain is a historic home and farm complex located at Frederick, Frederick County, Maryland, United States. It is on the remaining 10-acre (40,000 m^{2}) tract from the original farm. The complex consists of a stone dwelling dating from 1810 to 1820 with a one-story kitchen wing; a 19th-century frame Pennsylvania barn; and a hog barn, wagon shed / corn crib, equipment shed, and chicken coop. The house combines Federal style elements with regional vernacular features.

Rich Mountain was listed on the National Register of Historic Places in 2005.
