= James K.P. Wolfe House =

Historic house in Maryland, United States

- U.S. National Register of Historic Places
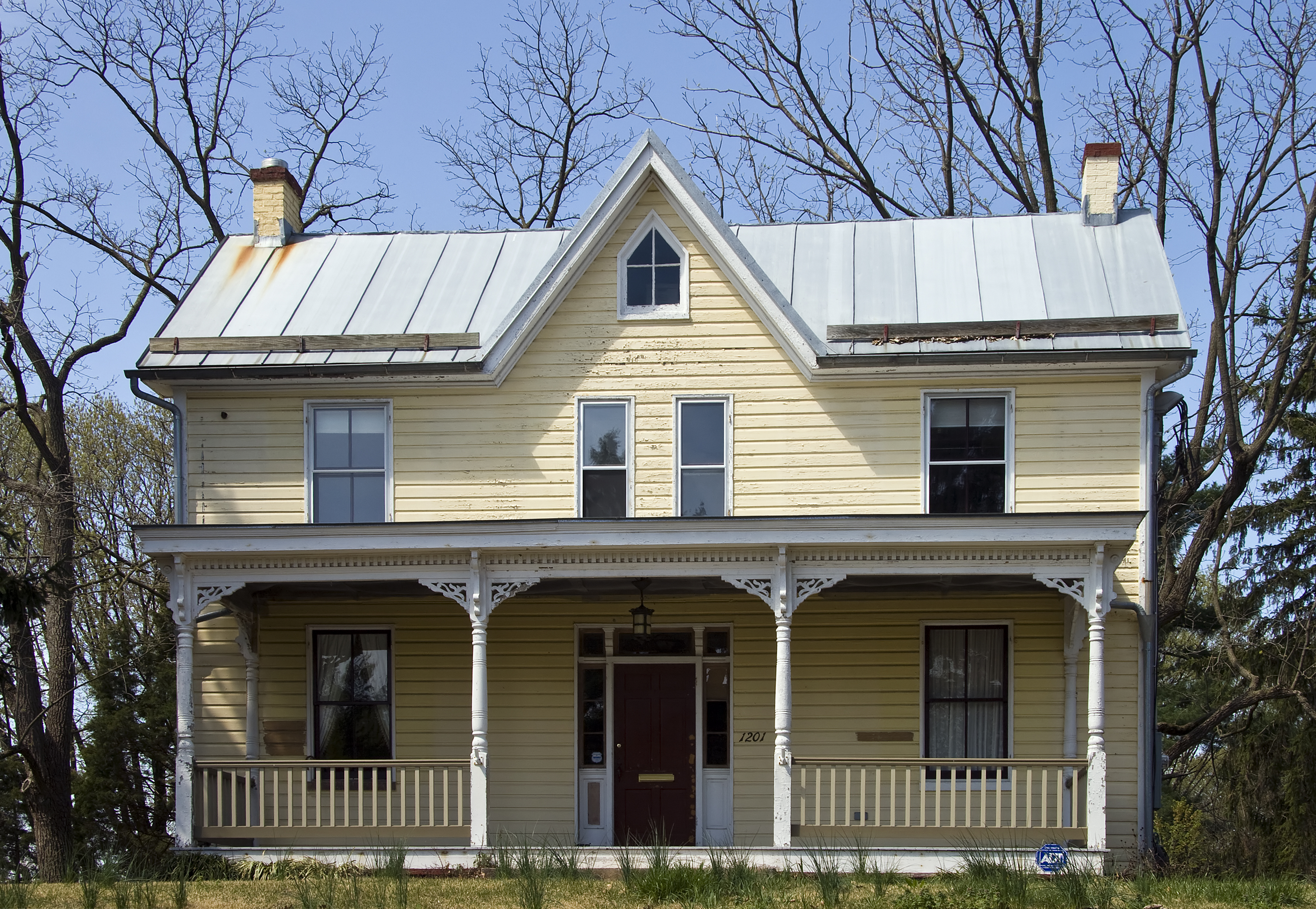

- Location within Maryland Location within the United States
- Location: 1201 Motter Ave., Frederick, Maryland
- Coordinates: 39°25′49.19″N 77°24′37.45″W
- Area: less than one acre
- Built: 1889
- Architectural style: Late Gothic Revival
- NRHP reference No.: 02001582
- Added to NRHP: December 27, 2002

The James K.P. Wolfe House is a historic home in Frederick, Maryland. It is a two-story, frame, single hall plan, Victorian period farmhouse with Gothic Revival-style detailing. It is a late-19th century example of the Maryland Piedmont farmhouse. The dwelling was built in 1889 by the Wolfe family, who owned the property until 1936.

It was listed on the National Register of Historic Places in 2002.
