= Cockey-Jamison-Hendrickson House and Store =

Historic house in Maryland, United States

- U.S. National Register of Historic Places
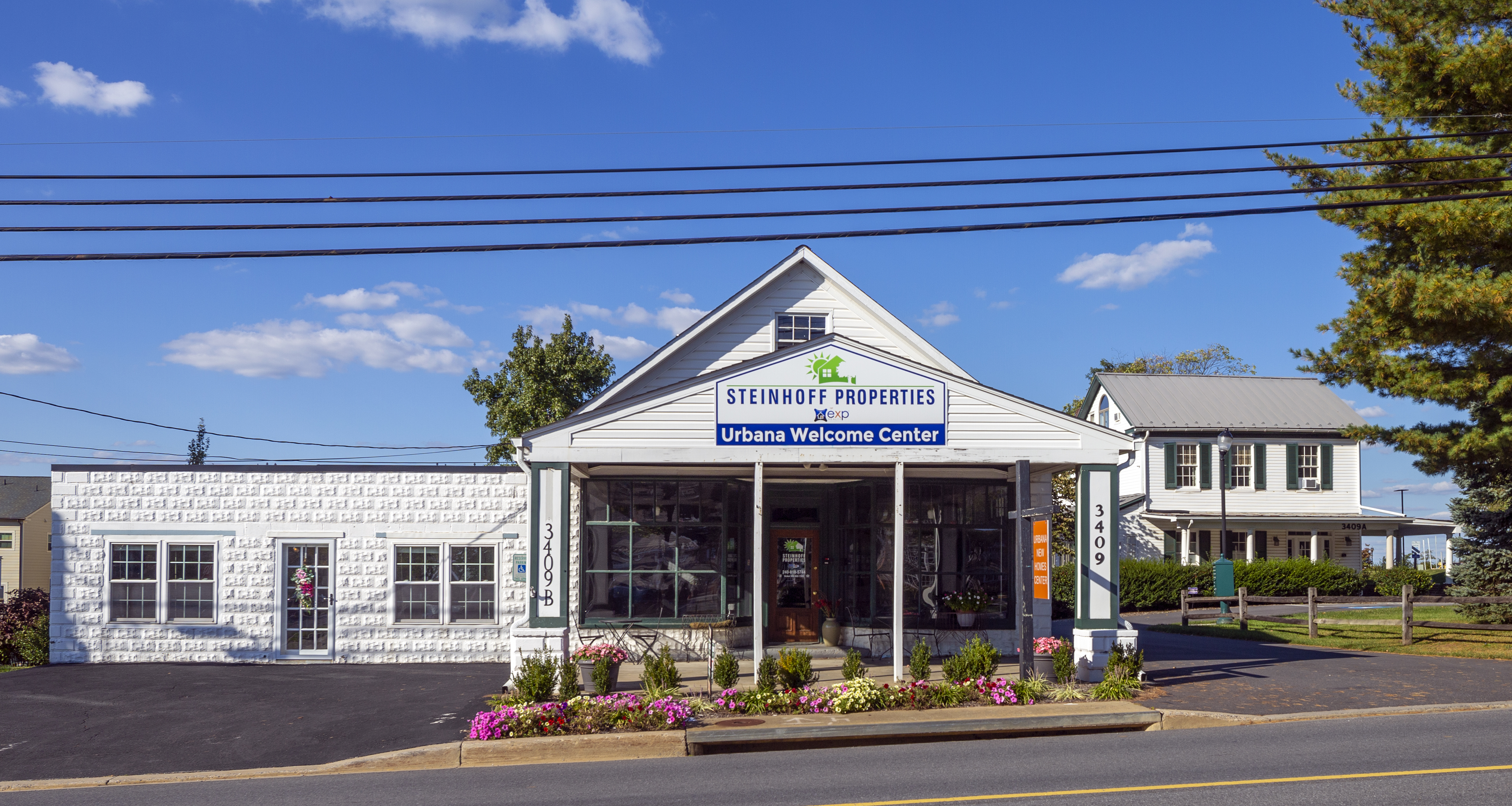

- Location within Maryland Location within the United States
- Location: 3409 Urbana Pike; Urbana, Maryland
- Coordinates: 39°19′34.2″N 77°20′56.8″W
- Built: c. 1850-1927
- NRHP reference No.: 100003151
- Added to NRHP: November 28, 2018

The Cockey-Jamison-Hendrickson House and Store are historic buildings located in Urbana, Frederick County, Maryland, United States. The house and store were built by Sebastian Cockey, a scion of an old Maryland family. The house, c. 1850 with a 20th-century addition, is an example of vernacular domestic architecture of the period in this region. The 2½-story late Federal style structure follows an L-shaped plan, and features a three-bay facade, gabled roof, and a hip roofed porch. The adjacent store was rebuilt in 1927 to its present appearance. It is a typical rural commercial building for its time period. Originally known as "S. G. Cockey's Cash Store," it sold dry goods, hardware, farm supplies, and Esso gasoline until 1958.

The property is also said to be the location of Confederate General J. E. B. Stuart’s cavalry encampment in September 1862. It was during this encampment that he and his officers held a fancy dress ball for the local ladies at Landon Hall next door. The buildings were listed on the National Register of Historic Places in 2018.
