= Daniel Sheffer Farm =

- U.S. National Register of Historic Places
- Location within Maryland Location within the United States
- Location: 8926 Mount Tabor Road, Middletown, Maryland
- Coordinates: 39°28′43″N 77°35′39″W
- Area: 144.3 acres (58.4 ha)
- Built: 1862
- Architectural style: Mid 19th Century Revival
- NRHP reference No.: 01001375
- Added to NRHP: December 28, 2001

The Daniel Sheffer Farm is a historic home and farm complex located at Middletown, Frederick County, Maryland, United States. It is dominated by the two story brick main house, which was constructed between 1840 and 1850. Outbuildings include a stone spring house, a large wood-frame barn, constructed about 1900, and several wood-frame outbuildings including a corncrib, a wagon shed, three frame wood sheds, two tractor sheds, and a chicken house. A concrete block milk house and terra cotta silo were added to the complex in the 1930s. In September 1862, the property served as a temporary hospital for wounded soldiers during the Battle of South Mountain in the American Civil War.

The Daniel Sheffer Farm was listed on the National Register of Historic Places in 2001.
