= Highland Lodge =

Historic house in Maryland, United States

- U.S. National Register of Historic Places
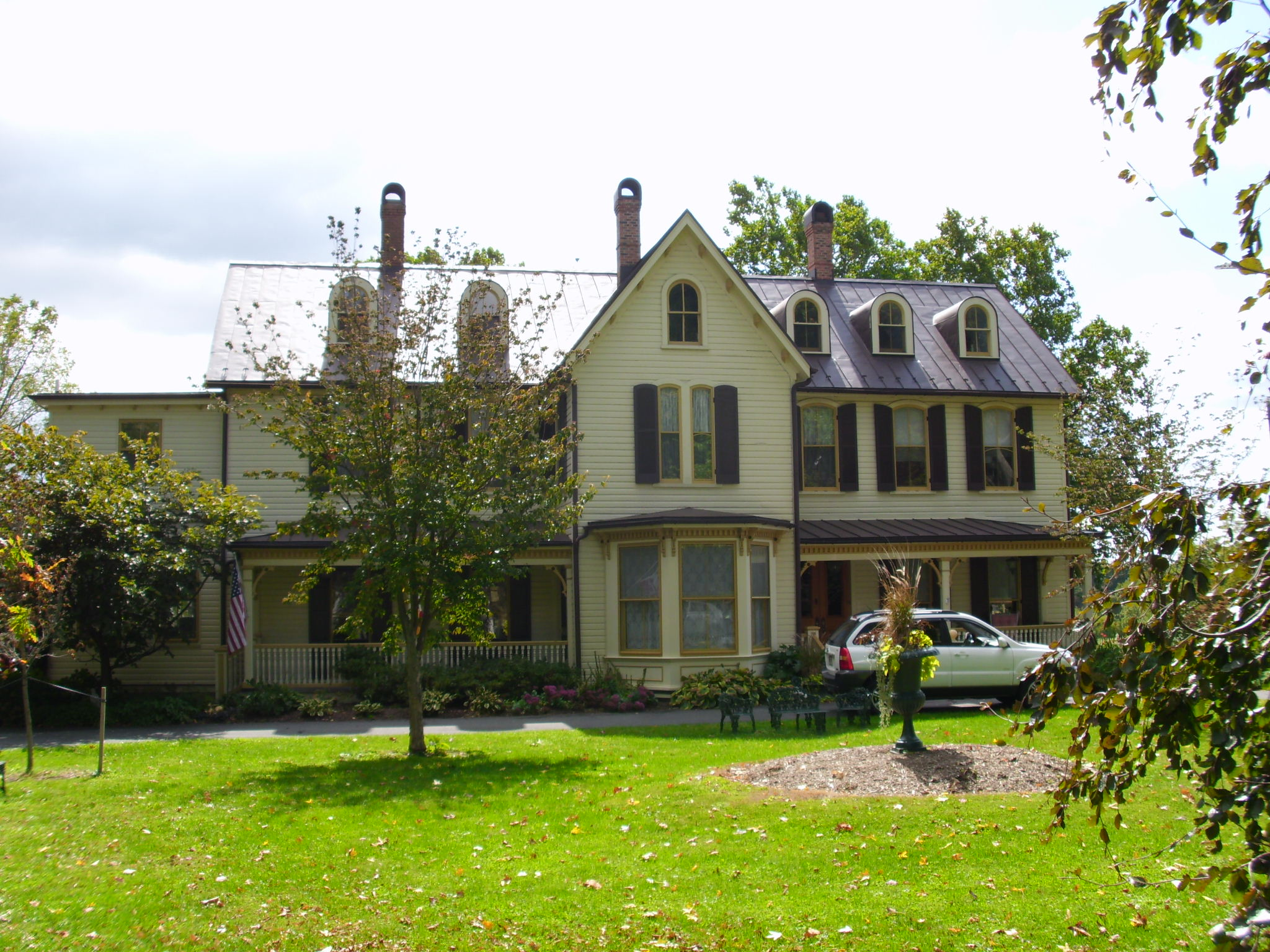
- Highland Lodge, March 2009

- Location within Maryland Location within the United States
- Location: 5519 Old National Pike, Frederick, Maryland
- Coordinates: 39°25′11″N 77°28′31″W
- Area: 6 acres (2.4 ha)
- Built: 1881
- Architectural style: Gothic, Colonial Revival
- NRHP reference No.: 98001262
- Added to NRHP: October 22, 1998

The Highland Lodge, also known as Pequea, is a historic home and resort building complex located at Frederick, Frederick County, Maryland, United States. It consists of a large Victorian period frame house centered at the end of a circular driveway, and its complement of outbuildings. The house is large and rambling and considered eclectic in style with a prominent central projecting gable. The property includes a frame stable and carriage house, now garages; a small frame barn; a small log dwelling moved to the property in the early 20th century; a frame summer kitchen and a frame secondary dwelling. It was developed originally in 1881 as a summer home for John H. Williams, a wealthy and influential Frederick attorney and banker.

The Highland Lodge was listed on the National Register of Historic Places in 1998.
