= Middletown, Maryland =

- Town
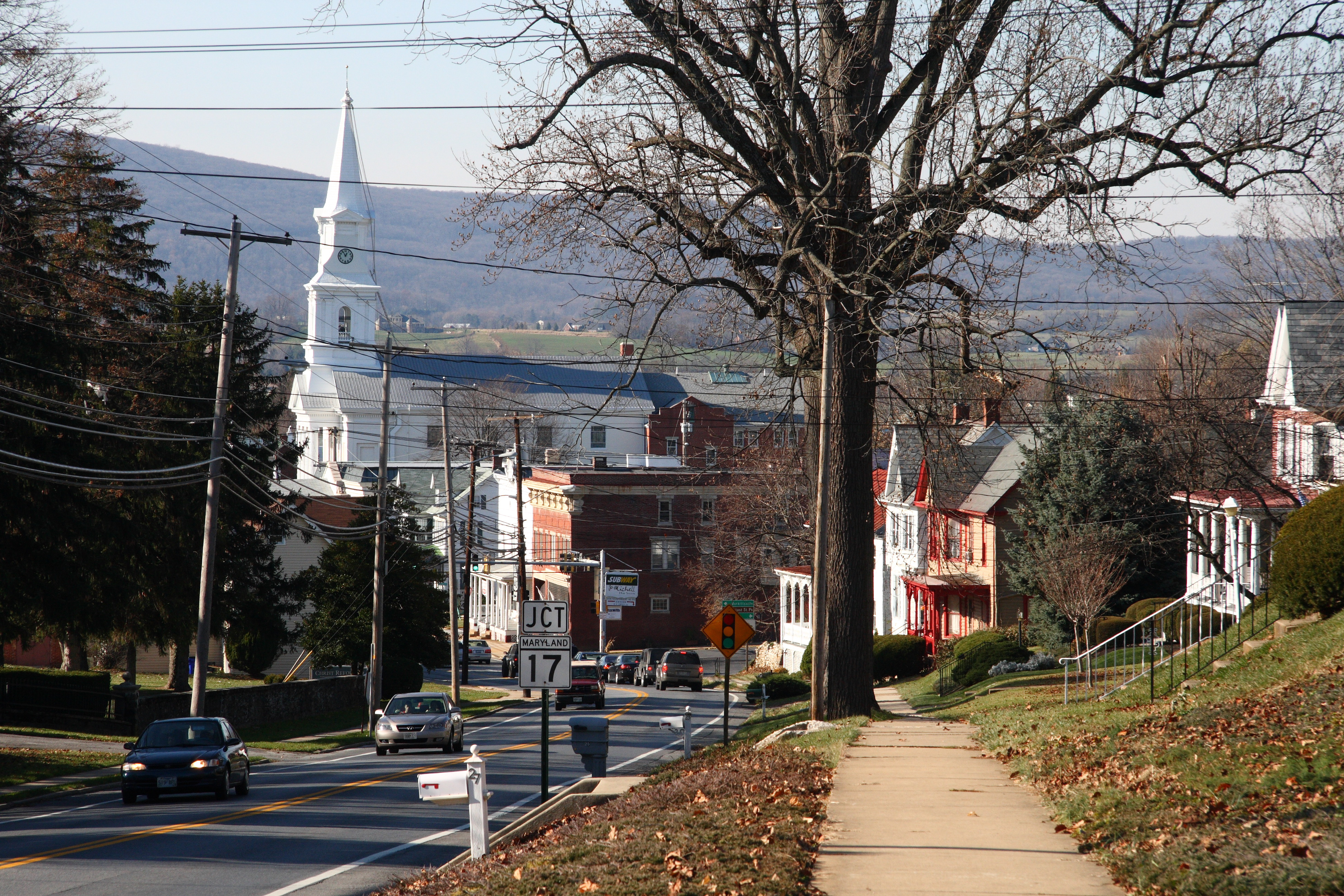
- Main Street, Middletown

- Flag Seal Logo

- Location of Middletown, Maryland
- Coordinates: 39°26′28″N 77°32′38″W
- Country: United States of America
- State: Maryland
- County: Frederick
- Incorporated: 1833

Area
  - Total: 2.12 sq mi (5.49 km^{2})
  - Land: 2.12 sq mi (5.48 km^{2})
  - Water: 0.0039 sq mi (0.01 km^{2})
- Elevation: 564 ft (172 m)

Population (2020)
  - Total: 4,943
  - Density: 2,334.2/sq mi (901.24/km^{2})
- Time zone: UTC-5 (Eastern (EST))
  - Summer (DST): UTC-4 (EDT)
- ZIP code: 21769
- Area codes: 301, 240
- FIPS code: 24-52425
- GNIS feature ID: 0585831
- Website: www.middletown.md.us

Middletown is a town in Frederick County, Maryland, United States. As of the 2020 census, Middletown had a population of 4,943. Located in the Middletown Valley that stretches between the Catoctin Mountains on the east and South Mountain on the west, the town reportedly gained its name from its location midway between those ranges.

== History ==
A young Lieutenant George Washington, while surveying the South Mountain area, reported that Middletown Valley was one of the most beautiful places he had ever seen. Later, as a colonel in 1755, he was to accompany General Braddock on the old Indian Trail that ran through the valley on his way to Fort Cumberland.

The early German and English settlers started to arrive in the valley in the 1730s. Among them was Michael Jesserong, who paid £66 for 50 acres (200,000 m^{2}). He named his property Middletown and sold the first lots there in 1767, the date officially marked as that of the town's founding.

Main Street spread to the west with construction of the National Pike through the town in 1806; the telegraph lines from Frederick to Hagerstown were routed through Middletown in 1854; and in 1896, car 11 of the Frederick Middletown Railway made its first run to Middletown. During the Civil War, both armies passed through the town to the battles of South Mountain and Antietam. In the aftermath of those battles, Middletown opened its churches and homes to care for the wounded.

Middletown preserves many historic structures indicative of its various periods of development and prosperity. The core of the old town, comprising the several blocks along West Main Street (US Route 40 Alt) and South Church Street (MD Route 17) contains several examples of Federal and Greek Revival architecture, including the Zion Evangelical Lutheran Church (1859–1860) and Christ Reformed Church United Church of Christ (1818). With the coming of the Hagerstown and Frederick Railway in the 1890s, the town expanded to the east, where several examples of various Victorian-era styles can be seen, including Queen Anne, Gothic Revival, and later examples of Colonial Revival styles. The economic prosperity experienced in the town during the first quarter of the twentieth century led to the alteration of older commercial structures and the construction of new ones in the first few blocks of Main Street, including the Beaux-Arts styled Valley Savings Bank (today the Middletown Valley Bank). Many of these structures are registered in the Middletown Historic District.

== Geography ==
According to the United States Census Bureau, the town has a total area of 1.74 square miles (4.51 km^{2}), all land. Catoctin Creek flows due south from approximately one mile west of town to several miles south of town.

To the east, Middletown borders Braddock Mountain, named after the British general Edward Braddock. The mountain itself, along with its community, Braddock Heights, is often said to be the roost of the mythical Snallygaster, a bird/dragon creature said to abduct livestock and people from the surrounding valley.

== Transportation ==
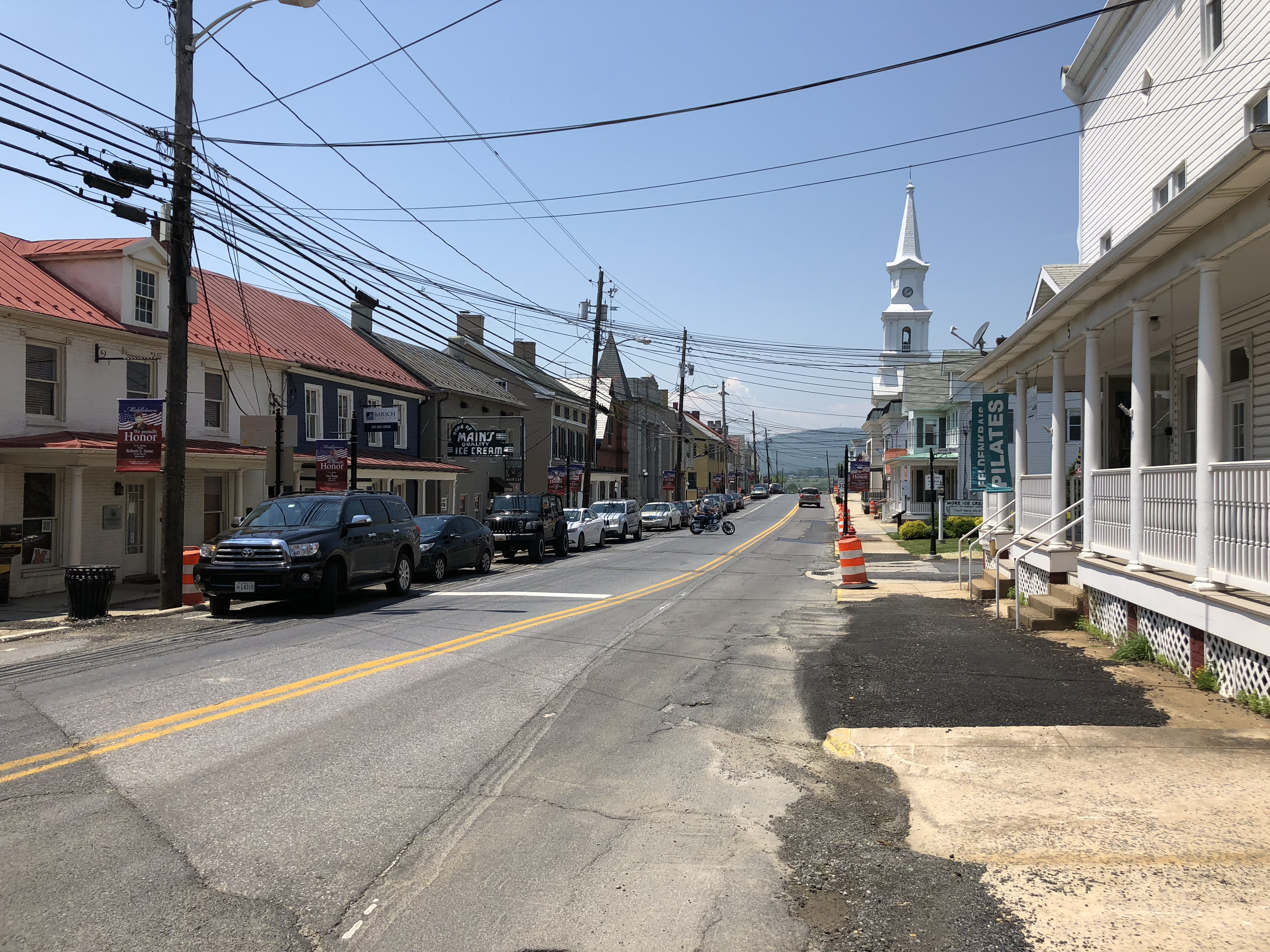
US 40 Alt westbound in central Middletown

The main method of travel to and from Middletown is by road, and there are two primary highways serving the town. U.S. Route 40 Alternate follows Main Street through Middletown, and connects eastward to Interstate 70 near Frederick and westward to Boonsboro. Maryland Route 17 follows Church Street through the town, extending northward to I-70 at Myersville and southward to U.S. Route 340 near Brunswick.

== Demographics ==
Historical population
Census	Pop.	Note	%±
1870	746		—
1880	705		−5.5%
1890	667		−5.4%
1900	665		−0.3%
1910	692		4.1%
1920	749		8.2%
1930	818		9.2%
1940	839		2.6%
1950	936		11.6%
1960	1,036		10.7%
1970	1,262		21.8%
1980	1,748		38.5%
1990	1,834		4.9%
2000	2,668		45.5%
2010	4,136		55.0%
2020	4,943		19.5%
U.S. Decennial Census

=== 2020 census ===
As of the 2020 census, Middletown had a population of 4,943. The median age was 40.0 years. 28.2% of residents were under the age of 18 and 14.7% of residents were 65 years of age or older. For every 100 females there were 96.4 males, and for every 100 females age 18 and over there were 93.1 males age 18 and over.

97.4% of residents lived in urban areas, while 2.6% lived in rural areas.

There were 1,751 households in Middletown, of which 42.2% had children under the age of 18 living in them. Of all households, 62.6% were married-couple households, 12.6% were households with a male householder and no spouse or partner present, and 21.5% were households with a female householder and no spouse or partner present. About 17.1% of all households were made up of individuals and 8.3% had someone living alone who was 65 years of age or older.

There were 1,830 housing units, of which 4.3% were vacant. The homeowner vacancy rate was 0.9% and the rental vacancy rate was 8.9%.

Racial composition as of the 2020 census
Race	Number	Percent
White	4,181	84.6%
Black or African American	162	3.3%
American Indian and Alaska Native	6	0.1%
Asian	199	4.0%
Native Hawaiian and Other Pacific Islander	0	0.0%
Some other race	59	1.2%
Two or more races	336	6.8%
Hispanic or Latino (of any race)	259	5.2%

=== 2010 census ===
As of the census of 2010, there were 4,136 people, 1,484 households, and 1,166 families living in the town. The population density was 2,377.0 inhabitants per square mile (917.8/km^{2}). There were 1,569 housing units at an average density of 901.7 per square mile (348.1/km^{2}). The racial makeup of the town was 91.9% White, 2.8% African American, 0.3% Native American, 2.8% Asian, 0.1% Pacific Islander, 0.6% from other races, and 1.6% from two or more races. Hispanic or Latino of any race were 3.1% of the population.

There were 1,484 households, of which 45.3% had children under the age of 18 living with them, 64.8% were married couples living together, 10.4% had a female householder with no husband present, 3.4% had a male householder with no wife present, and 21.4% were non-families. 18.1% of all households were made up of individuals, and 7.6% had someone living alone who was 65 years of age or older. The average household size was 2.79 and the average family size was 3.16.

The median age in the town was 39.6 years. 29.9% of residents were under the age of 18; 6.5% were between the ages of 18 and 24; 23.2% were from 25 to 44; 29.7% were from 45 to 64; and 10.6% were 65 years of age or older. The gender makeup of the town was 48.8% male and 51.2% female.

=== 2000 census ===
As of the census of 2000, there were 2,668 people, 960 households, and 728 families living in the town. The population density was 1,577.3 inhabitants per square mile (609.0/km^{2}). There were 981 housing units at an average density of 580.0 per square mile (223.9/km^{2}). The racial makeup of the town was 96.89% White, 1.46% African American, 0.07% Native American, 0.34% Asian, 0.22% from other races, and 1.01% from two or more races. Hispanic or Latino of any race were 0.82% of the population.

There were 960 households, out of which 44.6% had children under the age of 18 living with them, 63.6% were married couples living together, 8.6% had a female householder with no husband present, and 24.1% were non-families. 18.9% of all households were made up of individuals, and 8.9% had someone living alone who was 65 years of age or older. The average household size was 2.78 and the average family size was 3.21.

In the town, the population was spread out, with 32.0% under the age of 18, 5.4% from 18 to 24, 29.9% from 25 to 44, 21.7% from 45 to 64, and 11.0% who were 65 years of age or older. The median age was 36 years. For every 100 females, there were 91.8 males. For every 100 females age 18 and over, there were 87.6 males.

The median income for a household in the town was $67,266, and the median income for a family was $80,115. Males had a median income of $48,864 versus $31,602 for females. The per capita income for the town was $25,759. About 1.8% of families and 3.0% of the population were below the poverty line, including 2.1% of those under age 18 and 8.5% of those age 65 or over.

== Education ==
It is in Frederick County Public Schools.

School zoning is as follows: Middletown Primary School, Middletown Elementary School, Middletown Middle School, and Middletown High School.

== Notable people ==
- Scott Devours, drummer with Roger Daltrey
- Rick Leonard, National Football League player
- Charlie "King Kong" Keller, five-time Major League Baseball All-Star
- Hal Keller, Major League Baseball player, former vice president/general manager of Seattle Mariners
- Amber Theoharis, reporter for MASN/Baltimore Orioles, co-host NFL Network
- Lawrence Everhart, A Veteran of the American Revolutionary War, the Rescuer of Lieutenant Colonel William Washington at the battle of Cowpens, and Maryland Pastor.
- Jason Freeny, toy designer.
