= Maryland Route 17 =

State highway in Frederick County, Maryland, US

Maryland Route 17
- Maryland Route 17 highlighted in red

Route information
- Maintained by MDSHA
- Length: 29.49 mi (47.46 km)
- Existed: 1927–present
- Tourist routes: Journey Through Hallowed Ground Byway; Antietam Campaign Scenic Byway

Major junctions
- South end: SR 287 at the Potomac River in Brunswick
- MD 79 / MD 464 in Rosemont; MD 180 near Rosemont; US 340 near Rosemont; MD 383 near Burkittsville; US 40 Alt. in Middletown; I-70 in Myersville; US 40 in Myersville
- North end: Frederick–Washington county line near Wolfsville

Location
- Country: United States
- State: Maryland
- Counties: Frederick

Highway system
- Maryland highway system; Interstate; US; State; Scenic Byways
← MD 16	→ MD 18

Maryland Route 17 (MD 17) is a state highway in the U.S. state of Maryland. The state highway begins at the Virginia state line at the Potomac River in Brunswick, where the highway continues south as Virginia State Route 287 (SR 287). MD 17 runs 29.49 miles (47.46 km) north from the Brunswick Bridge to the Frederick–Washington county line near Wolfsville. The state highway serves as the main north–south highway of the Middletown Valley of western Frederick County. MD 17 connects Brunswick and Wolfsville with Rosemont, Burkittsville, Middletown, and Myersville. The state highway also connects those communities with the valley's main east–west highways, which include U.S. Route 340 (US 340), US 40 Alternate, Interstate 70 (I-70), and US 40.

What is now MD 17 was originally designated MD 33. The first sections of the state highway were constructed in Brunswick and Rosemont in 1916. MD 33 was mostly constructed south of Myersville in the early 1920s; the last pieces of the Brunswick–Myersville highway were filled in by 1927. MD 33 was completed from Myersville to Wolfsville in the early 1930s. MD 33 swapped numbers with the original MD 17, a highway on the Eastern Shore, in 1940. The portion of MD 17 north of Wolfsville was brought into the state highway system in 1956, the same year the Myersville–Middletown Road was transferred to county control. The state highway north of Myersville was designated MD 153. In the mid 1980s, MD 17 was extended north from Middletown, assuming all of MD 153 to its present northern terminus. The modern Brunswick Bridge was constructed in the early 1950s, replacing a bridge constructed in the early 1890s at the same site.

== Route description ==
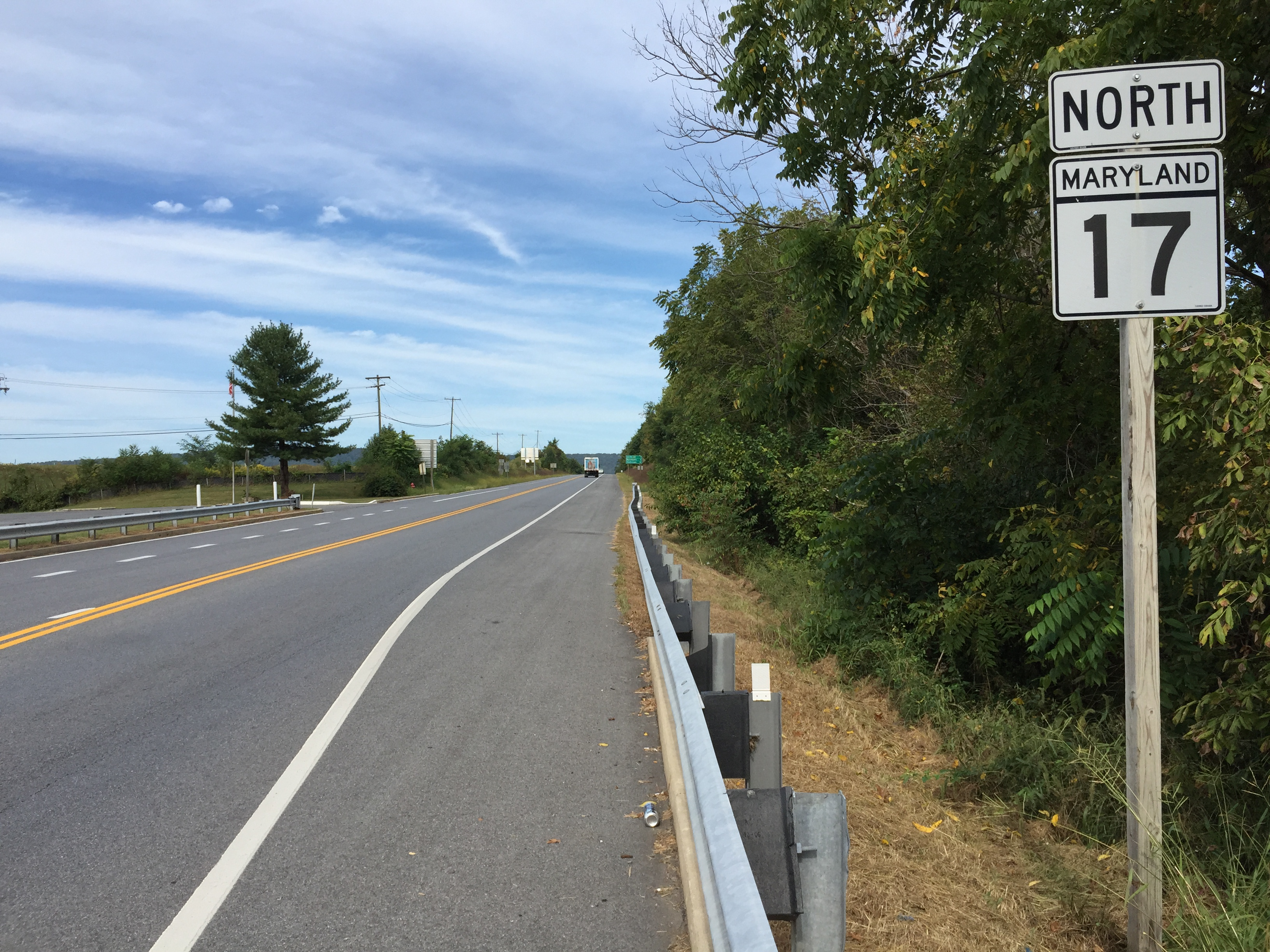
View north along MD 17 at MD 79 and MD 464 in Rosemont

MD 17 begins at the Virginia state line at the Potomac River in the city of Brunswick. The roadway continues into Loudoun County, Virginia, as SR 287 (Berlin Pike), which heads south toward Lovettsville. MD 17 crosses the river on the Brunswick Bridge, a two-lane steel girder bridge that also passes over the Chesapeake and Ohio Canal, CSX's Metropolitan Subdivision railroad line, Walnut Street, Virginia Avenue, and Potomac Street. The bridge's northern end lands just south of a roundabout that connects MD 17 with Petersville Road, Maryland Avenue, and both directions of B Street. Petersville Road, the old alignment of MD 17, heads south into the Brunswick Historic District and becomes Maple Avenue, which provides access to Chesapeake and Ohio Canal National Historical Park and the historic Brunswick train station, which is served by MARC's Brunswick Line.

MD 17 heads north from the Brunswick Roundabout as two-lane undivided Petersville Road, which climbs out of the narrow Potomac River valley. At the top of the hill, the state highway leaves the city of Brunswick and enters the village of Rosemont, where the highway intersects MD 79 and MD 464 (Souder Road). Petersville Road continues north as MD 79 while MD 17 turns northwest onto Burkittsville Road. The state highway leaves the village of Rosemont, passes through a roundabout intersection with Volunteer Drive and intersects the western end of Rosemont Drive through a roundabout, the old alignment of MD 17 that is unsigned MD 871G. That roundabout also intersects the main entrance to the Brunswick Crossing development started in the early 2000s. MD 17 continues on to intersect MD 180 (Jefferson Pike) at a roundabout before crossing over US 340 (Jefferson National Pike) at a diamond interchange. At the end of the overpass, MD 17 passes through another roundabout which serves to distribute traffic to and from the on and off ramps of westbound US 340. North of US 340, the state highway runs mostly straight through farmland parallel to the upper reaches of Little Catoctin Creek intersecting with Brentland Rd. and then Lee's Lane following which the highway passes through a pair of right-angle curves and parallels South Mountain to the hamlet of Coatsville.

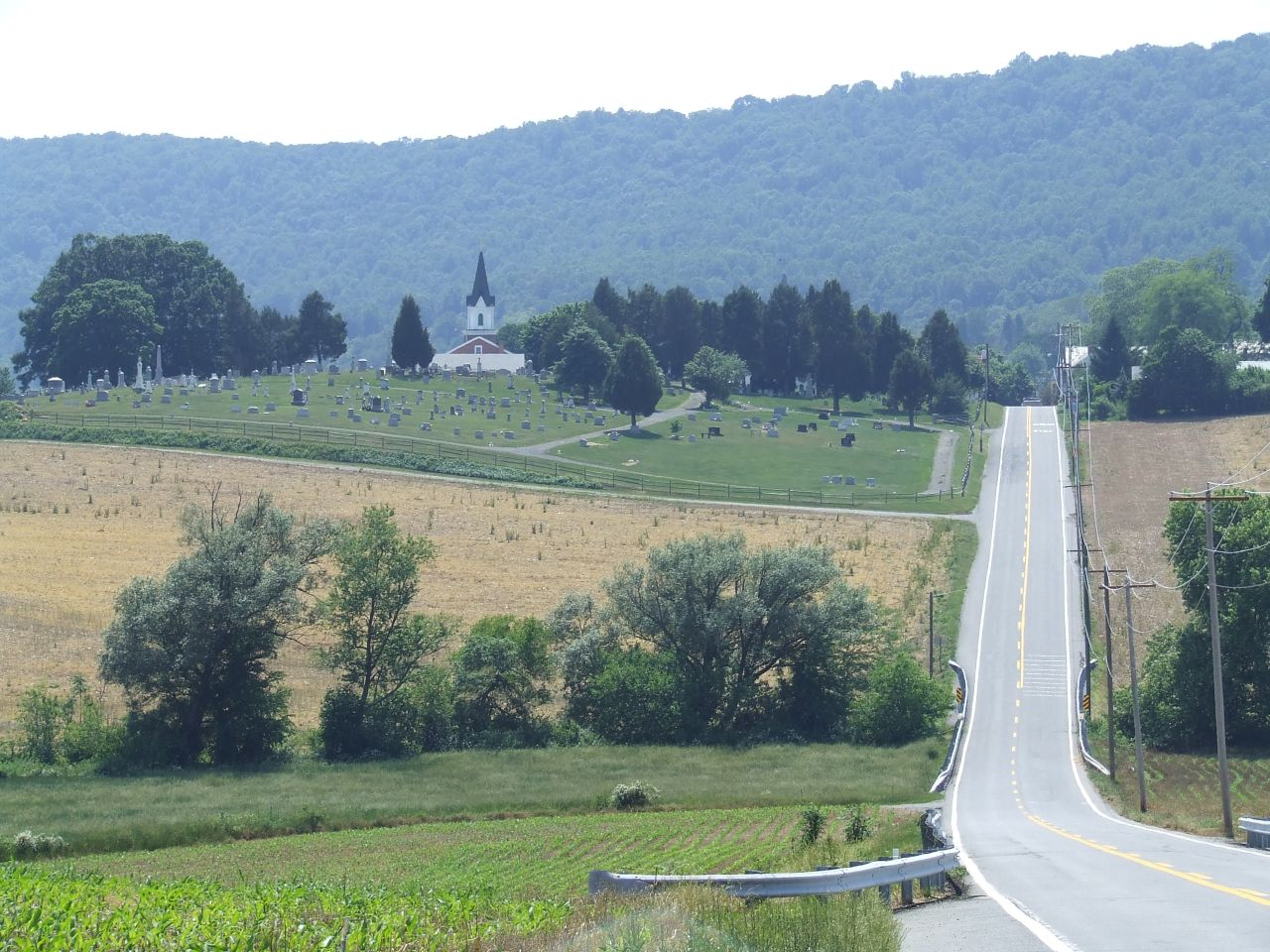
Southbound MD 17 entering Burkittsville

MD 17 curves to the northeast and enters the town of Burkittsville, where the highway's name becomes Potomac Street. Within the Burkittsville Historic District, the state highway intersects Main Street, which heads west to Crampton's Gap, a low point in South Mountain that contains Gathland State Park. MD 17 leaves Burkittsville and crosses Broad Run near the hamlet of Arnoldtown, then meets the northern end of MD 383 (Broad Run Road) and the west end of Bennies Hill Road, which leads to the Bennies Hill Road Bridge and historic Shafer's Mill. The state highway continues across Middle Creek and parallels Catoctin Creek before crossing the latter stream on a through truss bridge. MD 17 enters the town of Middletown just south of its intersection with Jefferson Street and Old Middletown Road. The state highway passes through town as Church Street and meets US 40 Alternate (Main Street) in the center of the Middletown Historic District.

MD 17 leaves Middletown as Myersville Middletown Road, which heads northeast then curves northwest to parallel I-70 (Eisenhower Memorial Highway). The two highways cross Little Catoctin Creek—this creek being a tributary of Catoctin Creek rather than the Potomac River-feeding creek near Brunswick—near the state highway's intersection with Harmony Road, then MD 17 veers west away from the Interstate. The state highway intersects Old Hagerstown Road at an oblique angle and crosses Catoctin Creek again before veering north and reaching Ventrie Court, which heads east to provide access to a park and ride lot serving MTA Maryland commuter buses. The road temporarily expands to a four-lane divided highway for its diamond interchange with I-70 at the town limit of Myersville. After reducing to two lanes, MD 17 continues as Main Street toward the center of town, where the state highway turns east onto Wolfsville Road. The state highway crosses Catoctin Creek just north of its confluence with Middle Creek and intersects US 40 (Baltimore National Pike) at the Myersville town limits.

MD 17 heads north into a mountainous area with a mix of farmland and forest at the northern end of the Middletown Valley. The state highway parallels Middle Creek, which it crosses twice, the second time at the hamlet of Ellerton, where the highway intersects Harmony Road, crosses the creek, then immediately turns east to remain on Wolfsville Road at its intersection with Harp Hill Road. Harp Hill Road is a straighter but much steeper alternate route between Ellerton and Wolfsville compared to MD 17, which parallels Middle Creek and crosses the creek thrice as it winds through the communities of Crossnickel and Middlepoint and passes the historic Peter of P. Grossnickel Farm. The state highway meets the northern end of Harp Mill Road and intersects Pleasant Walk Road and Stottlemeyer Road in Wolfsville. MD 17 leaves Middle Creek and ascends South Mountain to its northern terminus at its intersection with Garfield Road and Loy Wolfe Road at the Frederick–Washington county line. Wolfsville Road continues north as a county highway that descends South Mountain to MD 77 (Foxville Road) in Smithsburg on the eastern edge of the Hagerstown Valley.

== History ==
Maryland Route 33
- Location: Brunswick–Wolfsville
- Existed: 1927–1940

The first two sections of MD 17 to be constructed were Petersville Road from downtown Brunswick to what is now Rosemont Drive in Rosemont and Burkittsville Road from what is now MD 180 to Coatsville, which were completed as 14-foot (4.3 m) wide macadam roads in 1916. By 1921, sections of concrete road were completed from the National Pike in Middletown north to Valley View Road and from Myersville south to Catoctin Creek. Another section of the highway was planned to follow the alignment of Old Hagerstown Road south from the Myersville segment to the National Pike west of Middletown. By 1923, the gap between Middletown and Myersville was completed in concrete following the present alignment instead of Old Hagerstown Road. Other segments completed that year included a macadam stretch from Coatsville to Burkittsville and a concrete road from Arnoldtown to the National Pike in Middletown.

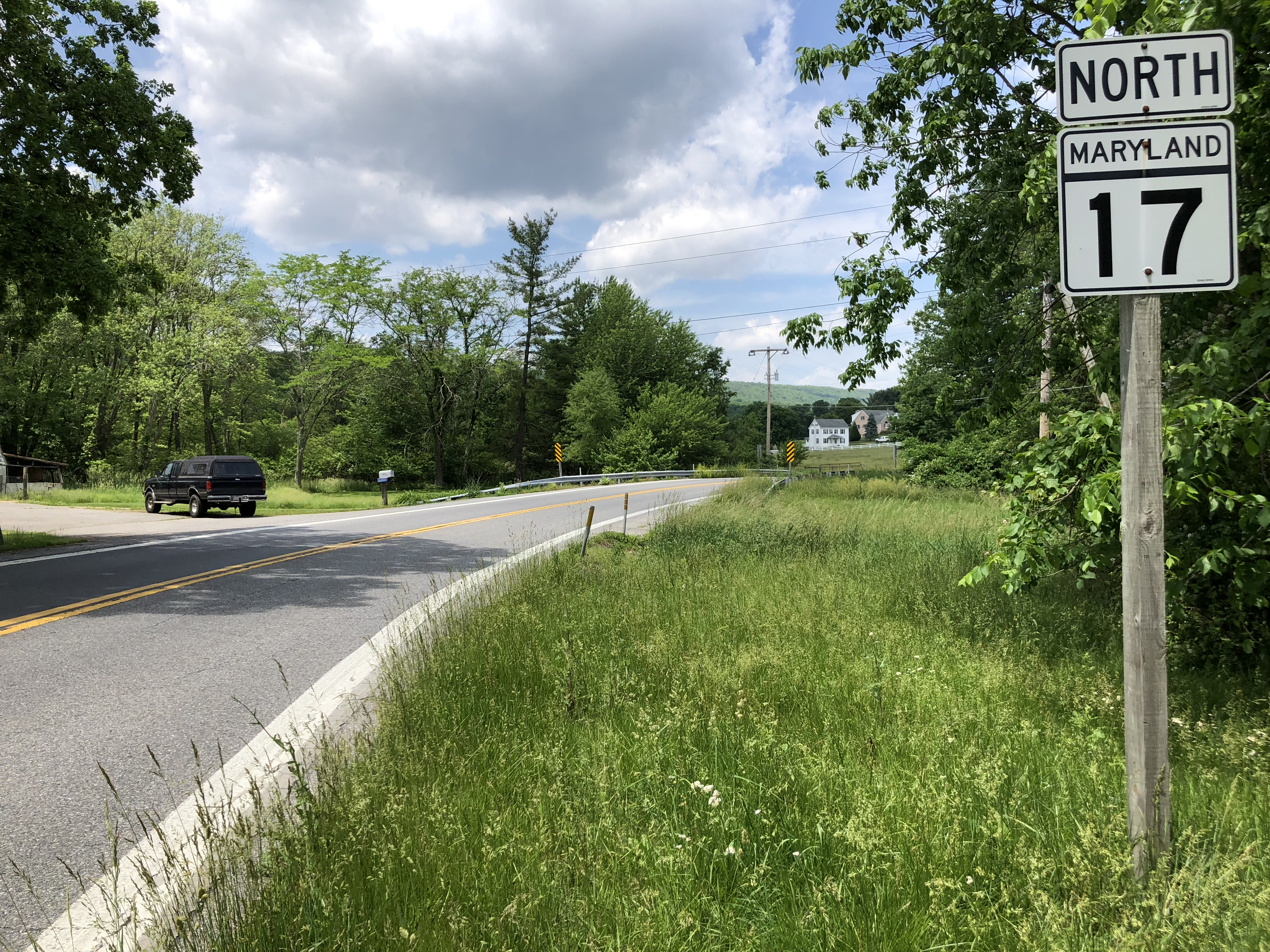
View north along MD 17 in Wolfsville

In 1927, what is now MD 17 became one of the original state-numbered highways when it was marked as MD 33. By that year, the gap between Burkittsville and Arnoldtown, Main Street in Myersville, and Wolfsville Road from Ellerton to Grossnickel had been paved with concrete. In addition, a macadam road was constructed from Main Street in Myersville to the first crossing of Middle Creek north of the town. The gap between that crossing of Middle Creek and Ellerton was filled by a concrete road in 1928. Wolfsville Road from Grossnickel to Middlepoint was started in 1930. That segment and the portion from Middlepoint to Wolfsville were completed in 1933. MD 33's through truss bridge over Catoctin Creek between Burkittsville and Middletown was replaced with the modern through truss bridge on a new alignment in 1934. All of MD 33 between Brunswick and Wolfsville was redesignated MD 17 in 1940, swapping numbers with modern MD 33 in Talbot County.

Maryland Route 153
- Location: Myersville–Wolfsville
- Existed: 1956–1985

The portion of Wolfsville Road from Wolfsville north to the Washington County line was brought into the state highway system in 1956. That same year, the portion of MD 17 between US 40 Alternate in Middletown and US 40 in Myersville was transferred to county maintenance. MD 17 north of Myersville was renumbered MD 153. MD 17 was placed on its present alignment in Rosemont from MD 79 to Rosemont Drive in 1968; MD 79 was extended south to the new four-way intersection with MD 17 and MD 464 and the old alignment of MD 17 along Rosemont Drive became MD 871G. MD 153 was extended south of US 40 through Myersville to the I-70 interchange in 1979. MD 17 achieved its present course in 1985 when the highway between Middletown and I-70 was returned to the state highway system; MD 17 was extended along what had been MD 153 to the Washington County line. MD 17's roundabouts at the northern end of the Brunswick Bridge and at the MD 180 intersection were installed in 1999 and 2000, respectively.

The first ferry at the German Crossing of the Potomac River, named for the German settlement at Lovettsville, began at the site of Brunswick in 1731. The first fixed crossing of the river was a covered bridge constructed between 1854 and 1857 by the Loudoun and Berlin Bridge Company; this bridge was burned by Confederate forces in June 1861. In 1893, the Loudoun Berlin Bridge Company constructed an iron through truss bridge across the river on the abutments of the covered bridge. Both the covered bridge and the iron bridge were located in line with Virginia Avenue, immediately to the east of the modern bridge. Later, the access road to the bridge would follow Maple Avenue south from Petersville Road, cross the Baltimore and Ohio Railroad, turn west onto what is now the access road for the C&O Canal Historical Park, then turn south to cross the river. Construction on the modern Brunswick Bridge began in 1952 with preliminary engineering work and construction of the bridge's substructure and superstructure, which were completed in 1953. Work on the bridge's deck and the Maryland approaches began in 1953 and continued through 1954. The Brunswick Bridge was dedicated July 30, 1955.

== Junction list ==
The entire route is in Frederick County.

Location	mi	km	Destinations	Notes
Brunswick	0.00	0.00	SR 287 south (Berlin Turnpike) – Lovettsville	Virginia state line at Potomac River; southern terminus
Rosemont	1.45	2.33	MD 79 north (Petersville Road) / MD 464 east (Souder Road) – Petersville, Point of Rocks	Southern terminus of MD 79; western terminus of MD 464; MD 17 turns west onto Burkittsville Road
Rosemont	2.34	3.77	MD 871 south (Rosemont Drive)	Northern terminus of MD 871; Officially MD 871G
Rosemont	2.55	4.10	MD 180 (Jefferson Pike) – Knoxville, Jefferson	Roundabout
Rosemont	2.70	4.35	US 340 (Jefferson National Pike) – Frederick, Charles Town	Diamond interchange
Burkittsville	9.47	15.24	MD 383 south (Broad Run Road) – Jefferson	Northern terminus of MD 383
Middletown	12.96	20.86	US 40 Alt. (Main Street) – Boonsboro, Braddock Heights	
Myersville	18.25	29.37	I-70 (Eisenhower Memorial Highway) – Hagerstown, Frederick	I-70 Exit 42
Myersville	19.45	31.30	US 40 (Baltimore National Pike) – Hagerstown, Frederick	
Wolfsville	29.49	47.46	Garfield Road east / Loy Wolfe Road south / Wolfsville Road north – Smithsburg	Washington County line; northern terminus
1.000 mi = 1.609 km; 1.000 km = 0.621 mi

== Auxiliary route ==
MD 17A is the designation for Petersville Road, a 0.03-mile (0.048 km) section of old alignment of MD 17 immediately northeast of the Brunswick Roundabout.
