= Maryland Route 464 =

State highway in Maryland, United States

Maryland Route 464
- Maryland Route 464 highlighted in red

Route information
- Maintained by MDSHA
- Length: 8.10 mi (13.04 km)
- Existed: 1933–present
- Tourist routes: Chesapeake and Ohio Canal Scenic Byway

Major junctions
- West end: MD 17 / MD 79 in Rosemont
- US 15 in Point of Rocks
- East end: Ballenger Creek Pike in Point of Rocks

Location
- Country: United States
- State: Maryland
- Counties: Frederick

Highway system
- Maryland highway system; Interstate; US; State; Scenic Byways
| ← MD 462 | → MD 468 |

Maryland Route 464 (MD 464) is a state highway in the U.S. state of Maryland. Known for most of its length as Point of Rocks Road, the state highway runs 8.10 miles (13.04 km) from MD 17 and MD 79 in Rosemont east to Ballenger Creek Pike in Point of Rocks. MD 464 connects Brunswick with U.S. Route 15 (US 15) in Point of Rocks in southern Frederick County. The state highway was constructed from Brunswick starting in the early 1930s. The highway was constructed west from Point of Rocks in the late 1930s; the gap in the middle was filled in the early 1940s. In 1950, MD 464 was extended west through Brunswick to Knoxville. MD 464 was placed on its present course between Brunswick and Rosemont in 1968.

== Route description ==
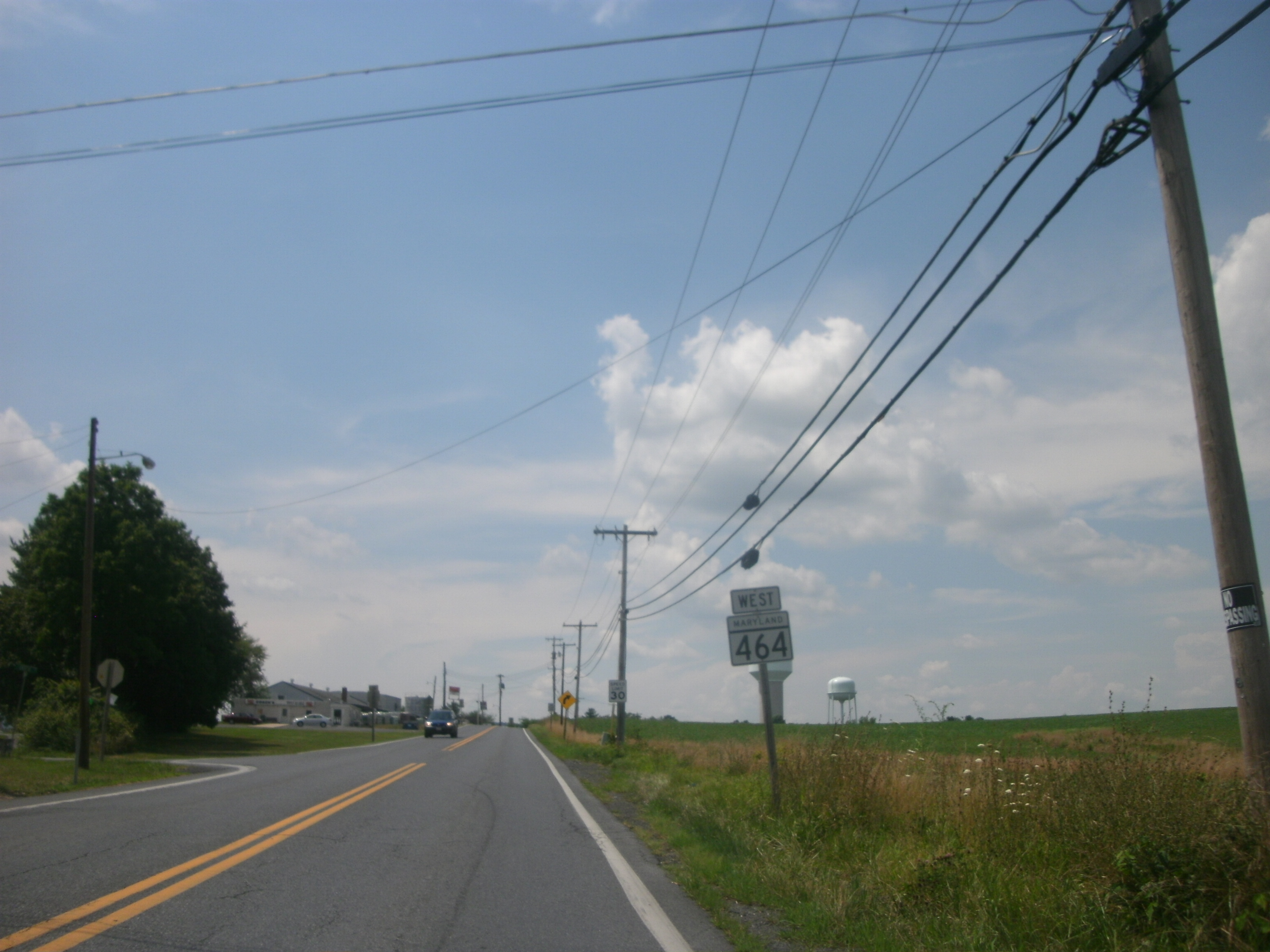
MD 464 westbound through Brunswick

MD 464 begins at an intersection with MD 17 and MD 79 (Petersville Road) just north of the boundary between the town of Brunswick and the village of Rosemont. MD 17 heads west as Burkittsville Road and south as Petersville Road into Brunswick. MD 464 heads southeast as two-lane undivided Souder Road between residential subdivisions and farmland and enters the town of Brunswick. At its intersection with Ninth Avenue and Cummings Drive west of Brunswick High School, the state highway turns northeast onto Point of Rocks Road. MD 464 crosses Little Catoctin Creek and Catoctin Creek, then starts heading southeast, paralleling Catoctin Creek until shortly before its intersection with Lander Road. The state highway meets the southern end of Lander Road prior to crossing Catoctin Mountain. MD 464 descends the mountain and meets US 15 (Catoctin Mountain Highway) at a roundabout on the edge of Point of Rocks. The state highway continues east a short distance to its eastern terminus at Ballenger Creek Pike south of St. Paul's Episcopal Church.

== History ==
MD 464 was constructed east from the intersection of Souder Road and Ninth Avenue to Olive School Road starting shortly after 1930 and completed in 1933; this section included a new concrete T-beam bridge over Little Catoctin Creek. The state highway was extended east to Lander Road, including a new through truss bridge over Catoctin Creek, between 1933 and 1935. One mile (1.6 km) of highway was constructed from Ballenger Creek Pike toward the southern end of Lander Road in 1938. The gap in MD 464 was filled in 1941. In 1944, the Maryland State Roads Commission suggested extending the state highway east to US 15 (now MD 28); this proposal has yet to pass.

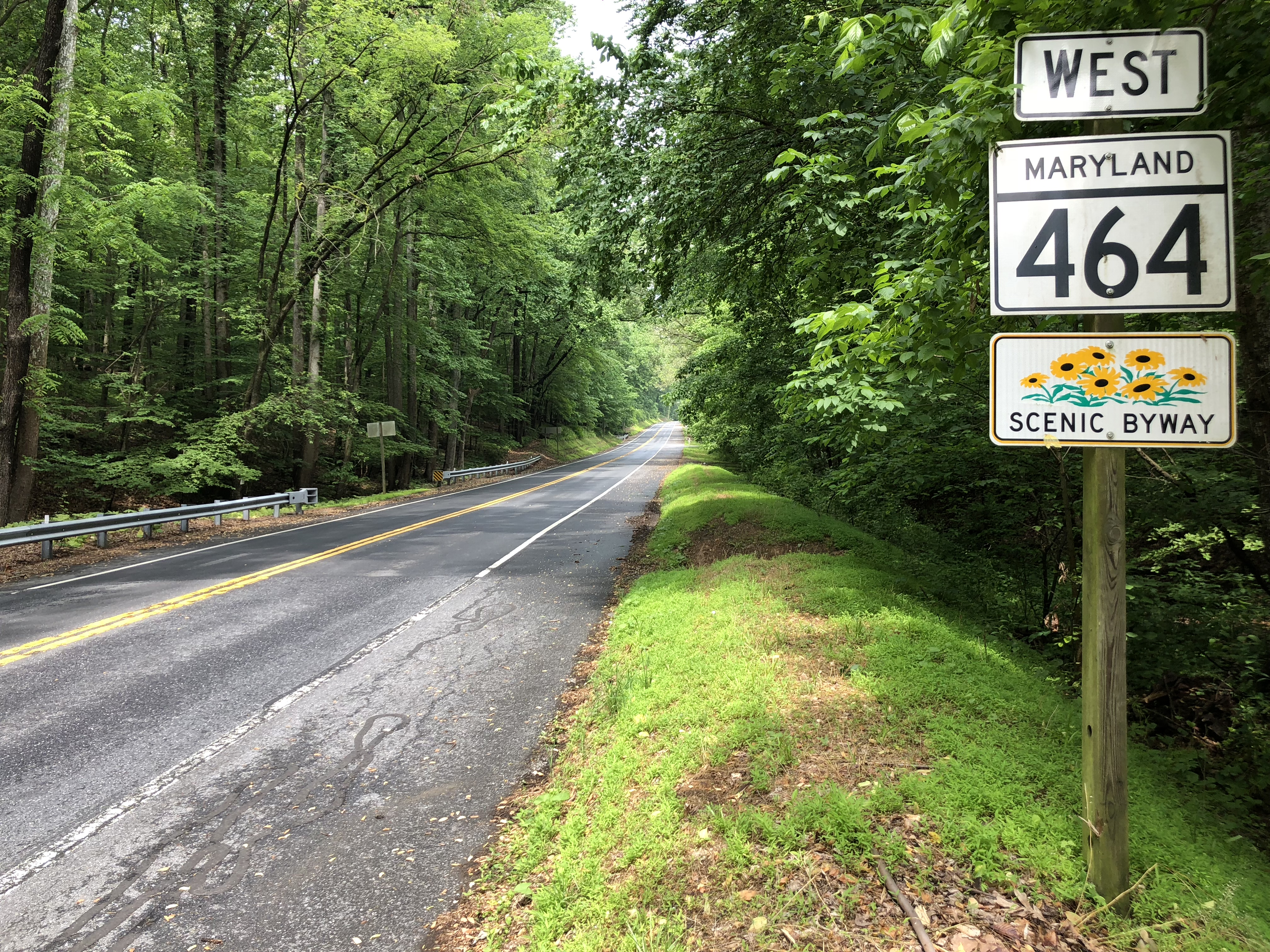
View west along MD 464 from US 15 in Point of Rocks

MD 464 was extended into Brunswick in 1950. The state highway followed Ninth Avenue to Potomac Street, then Potomac Street to the western limit of Brunswick. There, MD 464 continued west along Knoxville Road, assuming all of what was then MD 70 to US 340 (now MD 180) in Knoxville. In 1968, MD 464 was removed from downtown Brunswick and routed west from Ninth Avenue along Souder Road to the intersection of MD 17 and MD 79 in Rosemont. Knoxville Road was designated MD 478 by 1971. MD 464's roundabout at US 15 was constructed in 2009. The state highway's bridge over Catoctin Creek was replaced in 2010 and 2011. MD 464 was closed to through traffic between Olive School Road and just past Horine Road when the old bridge was dismantled starting in June 2010. MD 464 reopened when the new bridge was completed in February 2011.

== Junction list ==
The entire route is in Frederick County.

| Location | mi | km | Destinations | Notes |
|---|---|---|---|---|
| Rosemont | 0.00 | 0.00 | MD 17 (Burkittsville Road/Petersville Road) / MD 79 north (Petersville Road) – Brunswick, Burkittsville, Petersville | Western terminus; southern terminus of MD 79 |
| Point of Rocks | 7.98 | 12.84 | US 15 (Catoctin Mountain Highway) – Frederick, Leesburg | Roundabout |
| Point of Rocks | 8.10 | 13.04 | Ballenger Creek Pike | Eastern terminus |
1.000 mi = 1.609 km; 1.000 km = 0.621 mi
