= Maryland Route 478 =

State highway in Maryland, United States

Maryland Route 478
- Knoxville Road
- Maryland Route 478 highlighted in red

Route information
- Maintained by MDSHA
- Length: 1.88 mi (3.03 km)
- Existed: 1971–present
- Tourist routes: Chesapeake and Ohio Canal Scenic Byway

Major junctions
- West end: MD 180 in Knoxville
- East end: Florida Avenue in Brunswick

Location
- Country: United States
- State: Maryland
- Counties: Frederick

Highway system
- Maryland highway system; Interstate; US; State; Scenic Byways
← MD 472	→ MD 480

Maryland Route 478 (MD 478) is a state highway in the U.S. state of Maryland. Known as Knoxville Road, the state highway runs 1.88 miles (3.03 km) from MD 180 in Knoxville east to Florida Avenue in Brunswick. MD 478 was constructed as MD 70 in the late 1920s. In 1950, MD 70 was replaced with an extended MD 464. MD 478 was assigned to Knoxville Road after MD 464 was rerouted to its present terminus in 1968.

== Route description ==
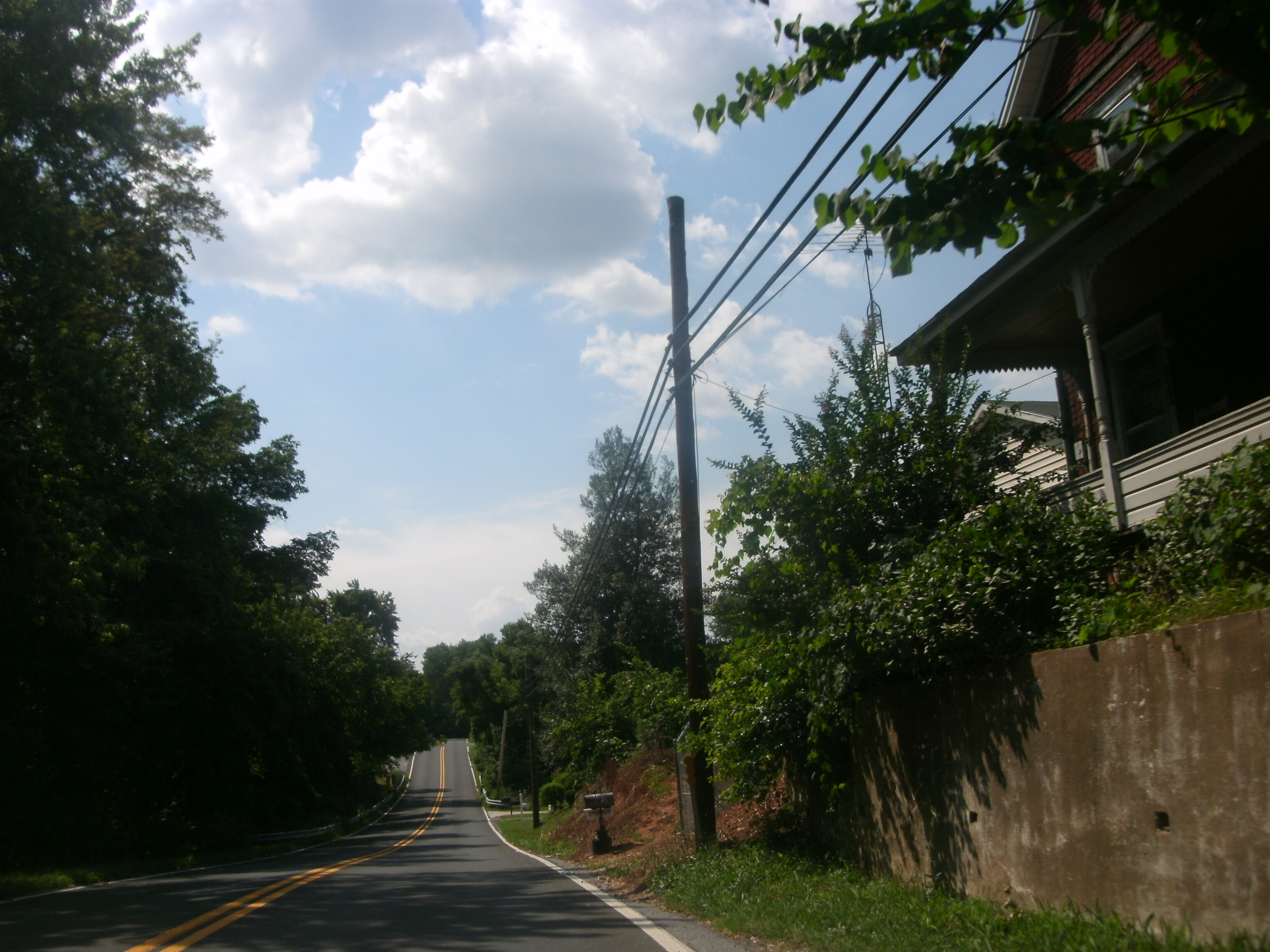
MD 478 west between Knoxville and Brunswick

MD 478 begins at an intersection with MD 180 (Jefferson Pike) in Knoxville. Westbound MD 180 provides access to westbound US 340 toward Harpers Ferry and Charles Town. MD 478 heads east as a two-lane undivided highway through a forested area parallel to the Potomac River, Chesapeake and Ohio Canal, and CSX's Metropolitan Subdivision railroad line. The state highway crosses several streams that flow into the Potomac River. After passing through the community of New Addition, MD 478 enters the town of Brunswick, where the state highway ends at Florida Avenue. The roadway continues east as Potomac Street, the main street of Brunswick that passes through the Brunswick Historic District. Potomac Street leads to Maple Street, which heads south to the historic Brunswick station on MARC's Brunswick Line.

All of MD 478, Potomac Street east from MD 478 to Maple Street, and Maple Street south to the train station are part of the National Highway System as an intermodal connector.

== History ==
Maryland Route 70
- Location: Knoxville–Brunswick
- Existed: 1927–1950

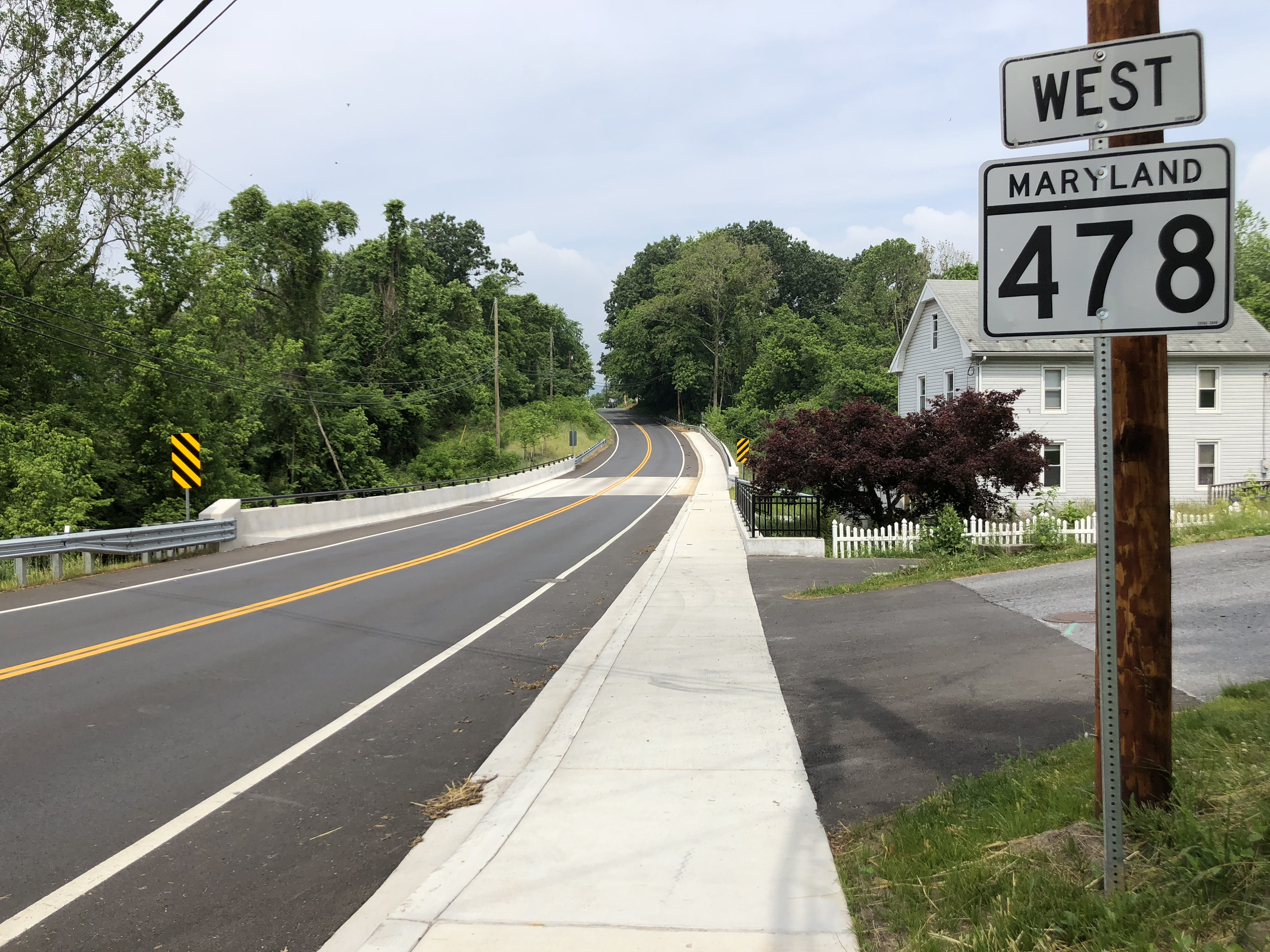
View west along MD 478 in Brunswick

MD 478 was originally constructed as MD 70 starting in 1926. The highway was paved from Brunswick halfway to Knoxville in 1927 and completed in 1928. The MD 70 designation was removed in 1950 when MD 464 was extended through Brunswick to Knoxville; MD 70 was reused for Roscoe Rowe Boulevard in Annapolis starting in 1954. MD 464 was removed from Knoxville Road in 1968 when the state highway was rerouted on Souder Road to its present terminus at MD 17 and MD 79. MD 478 was assigned to Knoxville Road by 1971.

== Junction list ==
The entire route is in Frederick County.

Location	mi	km	Destinations	Notes
Knoxville	0.00	0.00	MD 180 (Jefferson Pike) to US 340 west – Jefferson, Charles Town	Western terminus
Brunswick	1.88	3.03	Potomac Street east / Florida Avenue north	Eastern terminus
1.000 mi = 1.609 km; 1.000 km = 0.621 mi
