= Maryland Route 180 =

State highway in Frederick County, Maryland

Maryland Route 180
- Maryland Route 180 highlighted in red

Route information
- Maintained by MDSHA
- Length: 14.95 mi (24.06 km)
- Existed: 1965–present

Major junctions
- West end: US 340 in Knoxville
- MD 478 in Knoxville; MD 17 near Rosemont
- East end: I-70 / US 15 / US 340 in Frederick

Location
- Country: United States
- State: Maryland
- Counties: Frederick

Highway system
- Maryland highway system; Interstate; US; State; Scenic Byways
| ← MD 179 | → MD 181 |

Maryland Route 180 (MD 180) is a state highway in the U.S. state of Maryland. Known for most of its length as Jefferson Pike, the state highway runs 14.95 miles (24.06 km) from U.S. Route 340 (US 340) in Knoxville east to Ballenger Creek Pike and Interstate 70 (I-70) in Frederick. MD 180 is the old alignment of US 340 through Knoxville, Petersville, and Jefferson in the Middletown Valley of western Frederick County. The state highway was originally constructed in the early 1910s and designated US 340 in 1927. MD 180 was assigned to the highway bypassed by the US 340 freeway between Sandy Hook in far southern Washington County and Jefferson in the mid-1960s. The state highway was extended east to Frederick and south along Ballenger Creek Pike (former MD 351) after the US 340 freeway was completed in the late 1960s. MD 180 was rolled back to Frederick and removed from Washington County in 1989.

== Route description ==
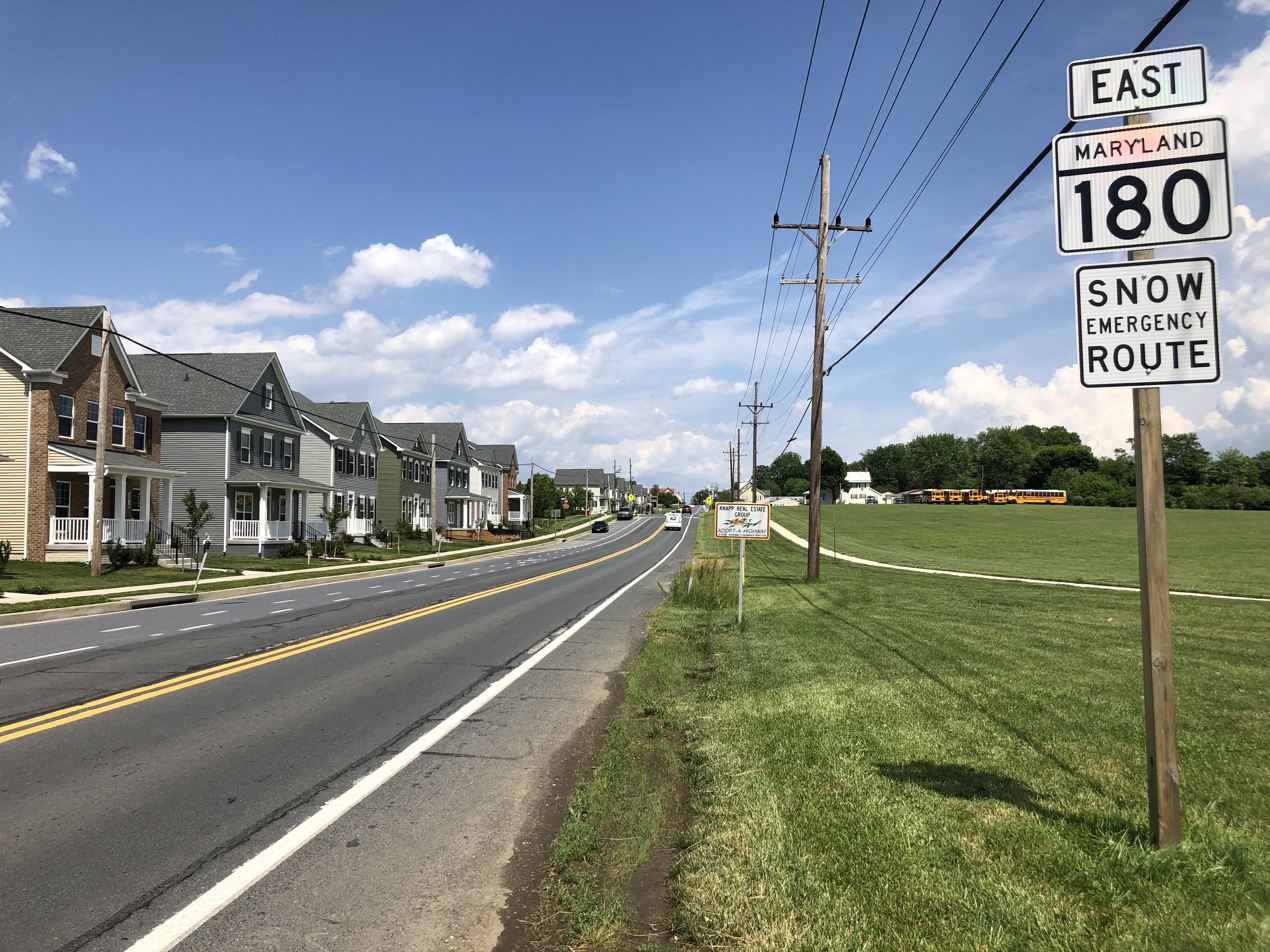
MD 180 eastbound at MD 383 in Jefferson

MD 180 begins at a partial interchange with US 340 (Jefferson National Pike) just east of the southern end of South Mountain at the Potomac River. There is no access from westbound MD 180 to eastbound US 340 or from westbound US 340 to eastbound MD 180. The state highway heads east as two-lane undivided Jefferson Pike, which parallels the Chesapeake and Ohio Canal and CSX's Metropolitan Subdivision railroad line to the village of Knoxville. MD 180 makes a sharp curve to the northeast in which the highway intersects MD 478 (Knoxville Road), which parallels the railroad, canal, and river east to Brunswick.

MD 180 heads northeast and temporarily gains an eastbound climbing lane as it leaves the narrow Potomac River valley. The state highway passes through farmland and meets MD 17 (Burkittsville Road) at a roundabout west of Rosemont. MD 180 passes southeast of a park and ride lot and crosses Little Catoctin Creek on its way to Petersville, where the highway meets the northern end of Petersville Road. East of Petersville, the state highway has a diamond interchange with US 340. MD 180 descends into the narrow valley of Catoctin Creek; the westbound direction has a short climbing lane. The state highway curves north to cross the creek, then curves back east and leaves the creek valley. MD 180 has a single ramp to westbound US 340 and meets the southern end of MD 383 (Broad Run Jefferson Road) before passing through Jefferson. The state highway intersects Old Middletown Road, which heads north past the George Willard House, and Holter Road and Lander Road; Holter Road heads north toward Middletown and Lander Road heads south from the same intersection toward an interchange with US 340.

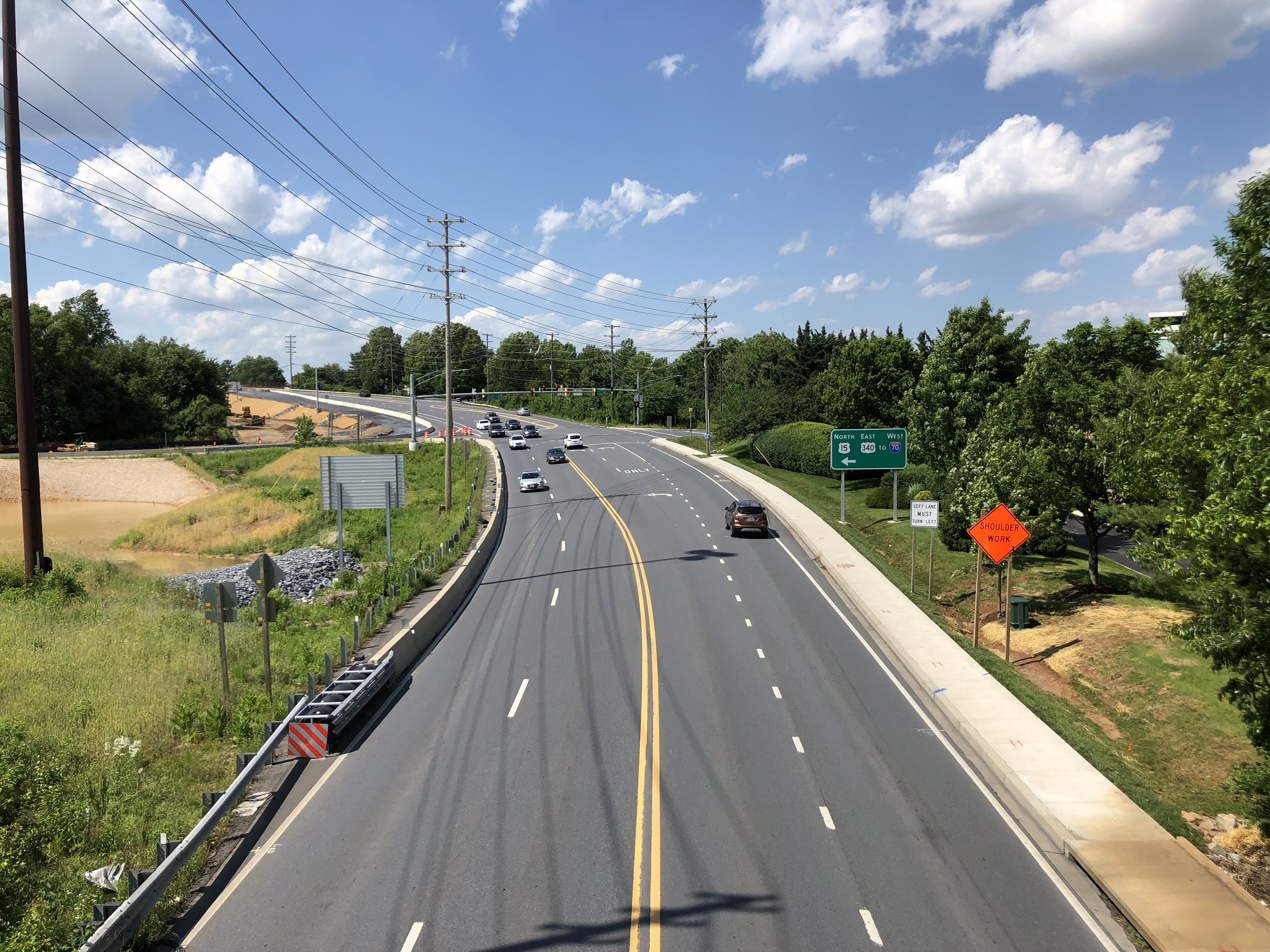
View westbound along MD 180 from the overpass for I-70 just south of Frederick

MD 180 parallels US 340 through a wide gap in Catoctin Mountain and continues northeast to the hamlet of Feagaville, where the highway intersects Mt. Zion Road at a roundabout and traverses Ballenger Creek. MD 180 crosses over I-70 (Eisenhower Memorial Highway) and intersects Butterfly Lane near Saint John's Catholic Prep before beginning a sweeping curve to the south. The state highway intersects Himes Avenues, which is unsigned MD 180B and leads to a ramp to westbound US 340 and US 15, at the same intersection as a ramp from that direction of the freeway. MD 180 crosses over US 340 and US 15 and receives a ramp from the eastbound direction of the freeway, then intersects Solarex Court and a ramp to the eastbound freeway that indirectly provides access to westbound I-70. Solarex Court provides access to a business park in the triangle formed by I-70, Jefferson National Pike, and the Frederick Freeway; this business park includes the historic home Linden Grove. MD 180 continues south as Ballenger Creek Pike, passing under I-70 before reaching its eastern terminus at Ballenger Center Parkway and a ramp to eastbound I-70 and I-270. Ballenger Creek Pike continues south through the suburb of Ballenger Creek.

MD 180 is part of the National Highway System between US 340 and MD 478 as part of an intermodal connection with the Brunswick station on MARC's Brunswick Line.

== History ==
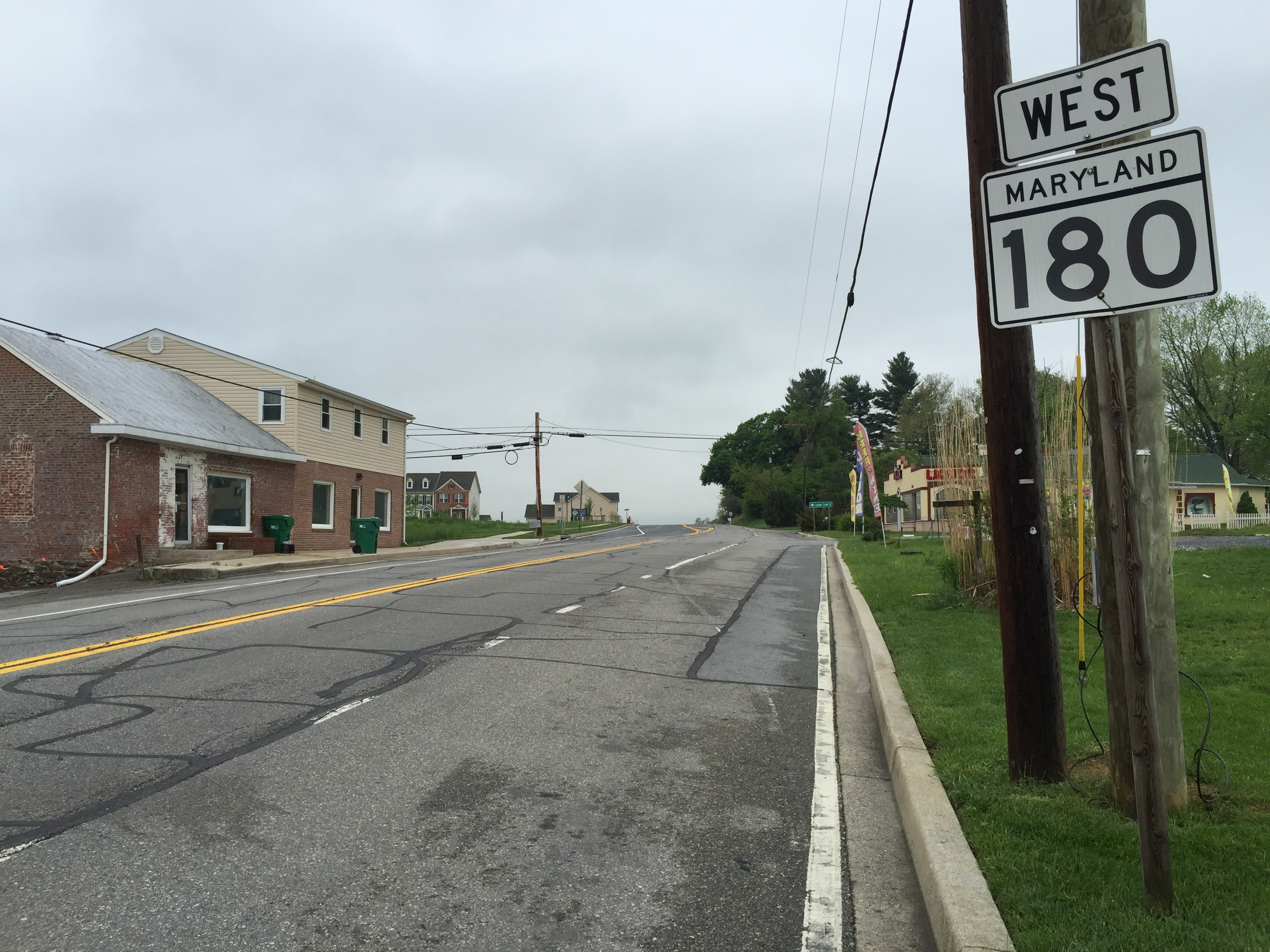
View west along MD 180 east of Knoxville

MD 180 is the old alignment of US 340 between Knoxville and Frederick. The state highway was originally organized as a turnpike called the Frederick and Jefferson Turnpike between the two towns. This highway became one of the original state roads marked for improvement by the Maryland State Roads Commission in 1909. The commission purchased the right-of-way of the turnpike in 1911 and resurfaced the Frederick–Jefferson highway with a 14-foot (4.3 m) wide macadam surface in 1915. The segments from Jefferson to Petersville and from Petersville to Knoxville were placed under construction in 1911 and completed as a 14-foot (4.3 m) macadam road in 1912. The Frederick–Knoxville highway was widened to 17-foot (5.2 m) in width around 1926 and became part of US 340 in 1927. US 340 was widened again, this time to 20 feet (6.1 m) between Frederick and Knoxville, by 1934.

The first portion of the US 340 freeway to open was between the MD 180 interchange east of Petersville and the ramp from MD 180 west of Jefferson was opened, replacing the curvaceous old alignment at Catoctin Creek. The present alignment of US 340 opened as a four-lane divided highway from the Valley Road / Keep Tryst Road intersection in Sandy Hook east to Weverton also opened that year. The portion of the freeway between Weverton and MD 180 east of Petersville was under construction in 1964 and completed in 1965. MD 180 was assigned to old US 340 from Sandy Hook to west of Jefferson in 1965. By 1967, MD 180 became a split route; MD 180A was assigned to Keep Tryst Road between its intersections with US 340 in Sandy Hook and Weverton.

Construction on the US 340 freeway from Jefferson toward Frederick began in 1966. US 340's interchanges with I-70 and MD 180 were completed in 1968 and the portion of the freeway from Jefferson east to the MD 180 interchange opened in 1969. At that time, MD 180 was extended east through Jefferson to the US 340 interchange in Frederick, which also served the northern end of MD 78. MD 180 was extended south over the length of MD 78 (Ballenger Creek Pike) toward Adamstown in 1970, forming a cane-shaped route. MD 180 was retracted to the US 340 interchange in 1989 when MD 351 was assigned to what had been MD 78. That same year, Keep Tryst Road was removed from the state highway system, leaving behind the stub that is current MD 180A. In 2002, MD 180 was extended east along Ballenger Creek Pike to Ballenger Center Parkway at the same time MD 351 was temporarily transferred to county maintenance south of its ramp to eastbound I-70.

MDSHA widened MD 180 to four lanes from Solarex Court to Ballenger Center Drive on 2017. On 2019, a project began, where Himes Avenue was extended from its western terminus at Butterfly Lane to MD 180, and truncated Butterfly Lane from its eastern terminus at MD 180 to Acropolis Way. MD 180 was widened to four lanes from its westernmost intersection with Himes Avenue to Solarex Court in Frederick. A new bridge was built south of the existing bridge at the route's northernmost interchange with US 340 and US 15 and currently carries eastbound traffic, while the existing bridge now carries westbound traffic, eliminating a major bottleneck on the state highway. The project began in September 2019 and was completed in September 2020.

== Junction list ==
The entire route is in Frederick County.

| Location | mi | km | Destinations | Notes |
|---|---|---|---|---|
| Knoxville | 0.00 | 0.00 | US 340 west (Jefferson National Pike) | Western terminus |
| Knoxville | 0.42 | 0.68 | MD 478 east (Knoxville Road) – Brunswick | Western terminus of MD 478 |
| | 2.12 | 3.41 | MD 17 (Burkittsville Road) – Burkittsville, Brunswick | Roundabout |
| | 5.47 | 8.80 | US 340 (Jefferson National Pike) – Frederick, Charles Town | |
| Jefferson | 6.97 | 11.22 | US 340 west (Jefferson National Pike) – Harpers Ferry, Charles Town, Brunswick | |
| Jefferson | 7.67 | 12.34 | MD 383 north (Broad Run Jefferson Road) – Middletown | Southern terminus of MD 383 |
| Frederick | 14.36– 14.63 | 23.11– 23.54 | I-70 west / US 15 / US 340 – Leesburg, Charles Town, Gettysburg, Hagerstown | US 15 / US 340 exit 11 |
| Frederick | 14.95 | 24.06 | I-70 east to I-270 south – Baltimore, Washington | |
| Frederick | 14.95 | 24.06 | Ballenger Creek Pike | Continuation south |
1.000 mi = 1.609 km; 1.000 km = 0.621 mi: Incomplete access

== Auxiliary routes ==
MD 180 has two auxiliary routes, including one in Washington County.

- MD 180A is the designation for Old US 340, a 0.03-mile (0.048 km) section of old alignment of US 340 east from a hairpin bend of Keep Tryst Road to a dead end in Weverton.
- MD 180B is the designation for a 0.18-mile (0.29 km) section of Himes Avenue that is part of the old alignment of US 340 from MD 180 east to a ramp to westbound US 340 and US 15 in Frederick.
