= Feagaville, Maryland =

Unincorporated community in Maryland, United States

- Unincorporated community
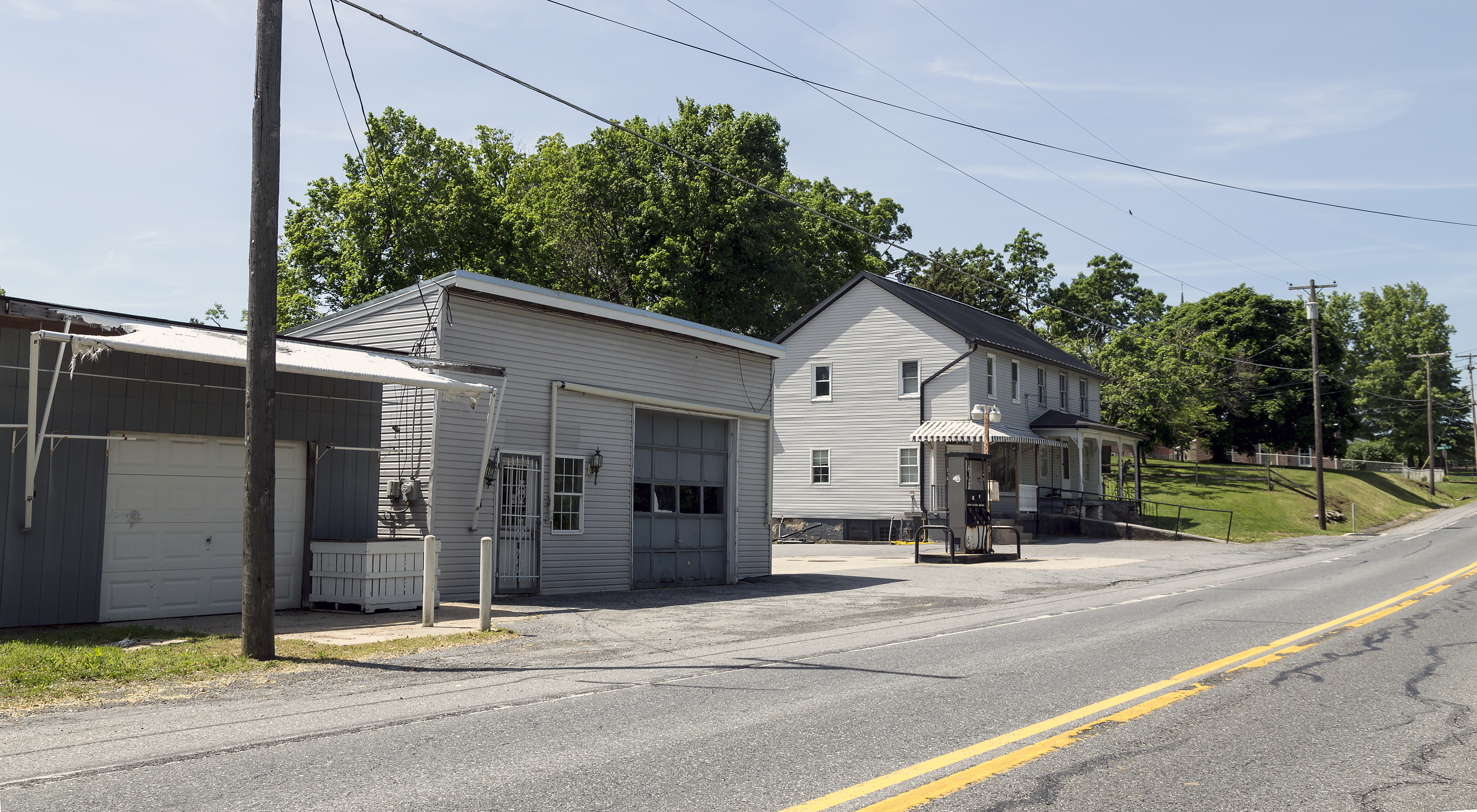
- The former Feaga's Store in Feagaville

- Location within Maryland
- Coordinates: 39°23′09″N 77°28′32″W
- Country: United States
- State: Maryland
- County: Frederick
- Elevation: 361 ft (110 m)
- Time zone: UTC-5 (Eastern (EST))
  - Summer (DST): UTC-4 (EDT)
- Area codes: 301, 240
- GNIS feature ID: 590196

Feagaville is an unincorporated community in Frederick County, Maryland, United States. Feagaville is located on Maryland Route 180, 4 miles (6.4 km) west-southwest of Frederick.
