= Linden Grove =

Linden Grove may refer to:

in England

- Linden Grove is a street in southeast London (SE26)
- Linden Grove is a street in southeast London (SE15)
- Linden Grove is also a street in Milton Keynes (MK14)

in the United States (by state)

- Linden Grove (Frederick, Maryland), listed on the National Register of Historic Places in Frederick County, Maryland
- Linden Grove Township, St. Louis County, Minnesota
- Linden Grove (Castle Shannon, Pennsylvania), listed on the National Register of Historic Places in Allegheny County, Pennsylvania

== See also ==
- Linden Grove Cemetery
