= Wolfsville, Maryland =

Unincorporated community in Maryland, United States

- Unincorporated community
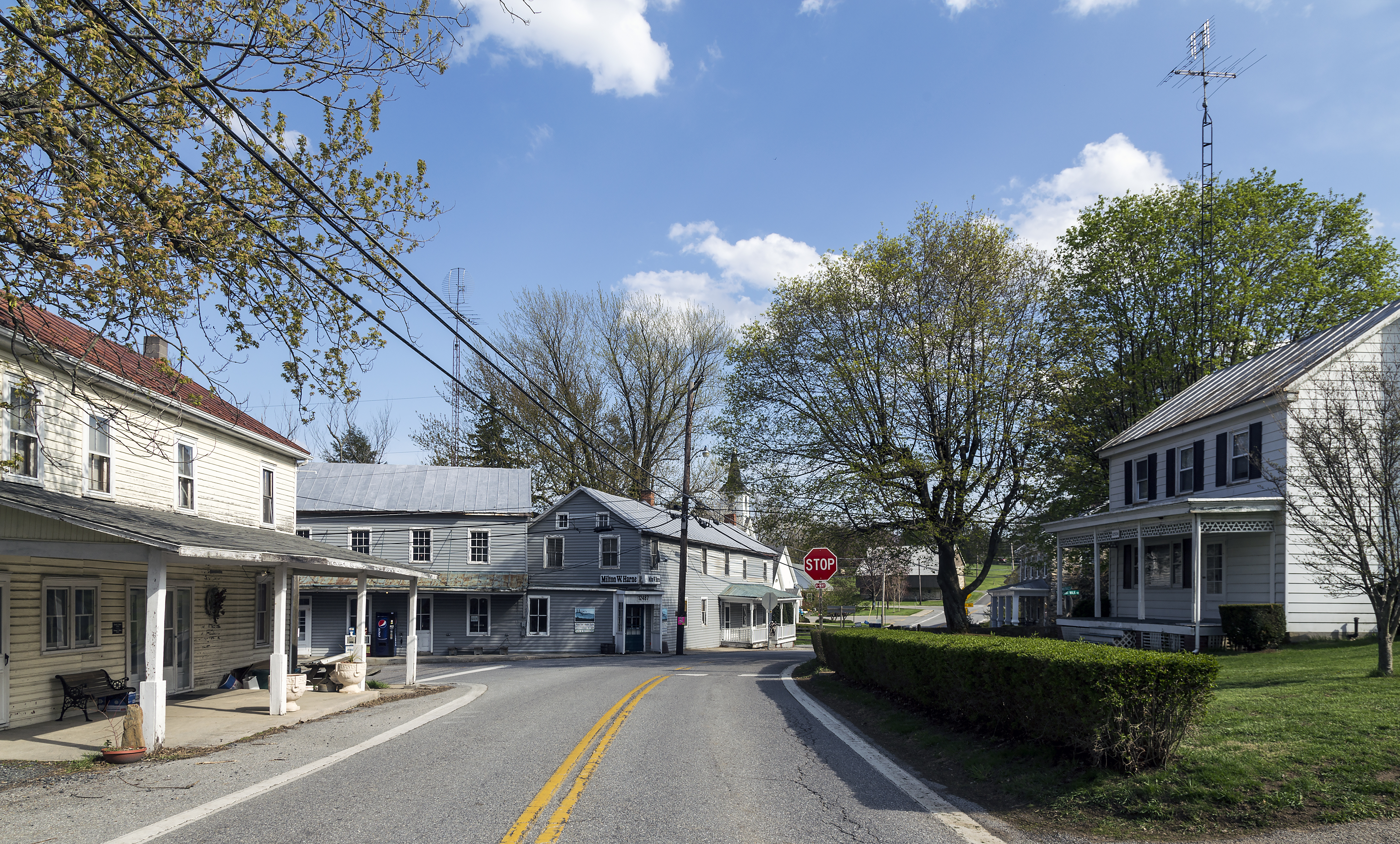
- The center of Wolfsville

- Location in Maryland Wolfsville (the United States)
- Coordinates: 39°34′27″N 77°33′02″W
- Country: United States of America
- State: Maryland
- County: Frederick
- Elevation: 1,034 ft (315 m)
- GNIS feature ID: 588318

Wolfsville is an unincorporated community in Frederick County, Maryland, United States. Situated in the upper Middletown Valley, the village developed as a regional center of commerce and industry in the mid-nineteenth century. The rural character of the community remains well preserved in its culture and architecture today.

== History ==
Beginning in the second quarter of the 18th century, European settlers, mainly Germans and Swiss, began to populate the northern Middletown Valley. Their first permanent settlement was called Jerusalem, located west of the present-day town of Myersville. As settlers began to spread out in the valley, taking advantage of plentiful timber sources and fertile farm land, crossroad villages began to develop, including Wolfsville, named for the Wolf Family who were living within the present village by the 1830s. In 1848, the population had grown to an extent that the General Assembly established a new election district called Catoctin with Wolfsville at its center. That same year, Wolfsville was affixed as a stop for the stage lines carrying U.S. mail throughout Frederick County. In 1851, a local effort was launched to create a new county from several districts in north-western Frederick and north-eastern Washington Counties, but the Catoctin District voted unanimously against the proposal.

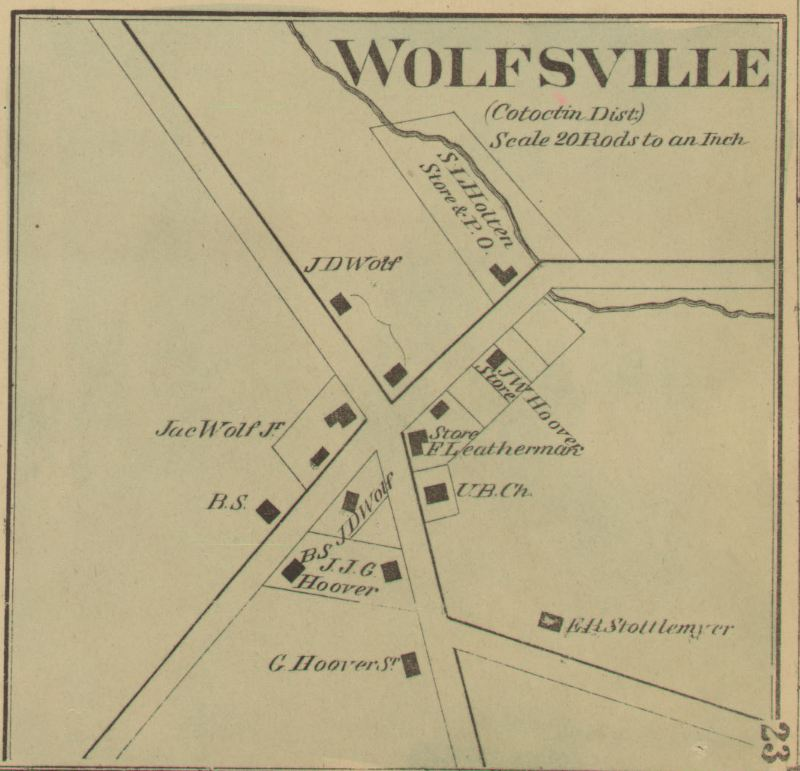
Wolfsville in 1873

Wolfsville continued to grow as a commercial center for area farmers. By 1858, the village was served by two general stores, a tannery, and a blacksmith shop. Two decades later, the village had expanded with a total of three general stores, two blacksmith shops, and a post office. Many of these buildings, designed to serve both as commercial spaces and dwellings, remain well-preserved in Wolfsville today. By the turn of the twentieth century, the construction of the Hagerstown and Frederick Railway bypassed Wolfsville several miles to the south, bringing growth to the town of Myersville.

Today, Wolfsville retains much of its historic fabric with a high degree of integrity. Architectural styles range from early vernacular expressions of Greek Revival or Federal styles to late Victorian era examples of Queen Anne and Gothic Revival styles. Several buildings display their original dual use as dwellings and commercial spaces. One general store remains in operation today at the crossroads in the heart of Wolfsville, operated by the Harne Family since 1945. The Hoover Farm, situated on the southeastern edge of the village, preserves an early 19th-century stone dwelling and barn, site of early religious meetings which later formalized into Wolfsville's churches. In the mid-19th century, Wolfsville had three churches: Lutheran, German Reformed, and United Brethren. Two of these congregations remain active today: St. Mark's Lutheran Church and Salem United Brethren Church, both built in 1847 out of native stone, but significantly altered since.

== Furniture production ==
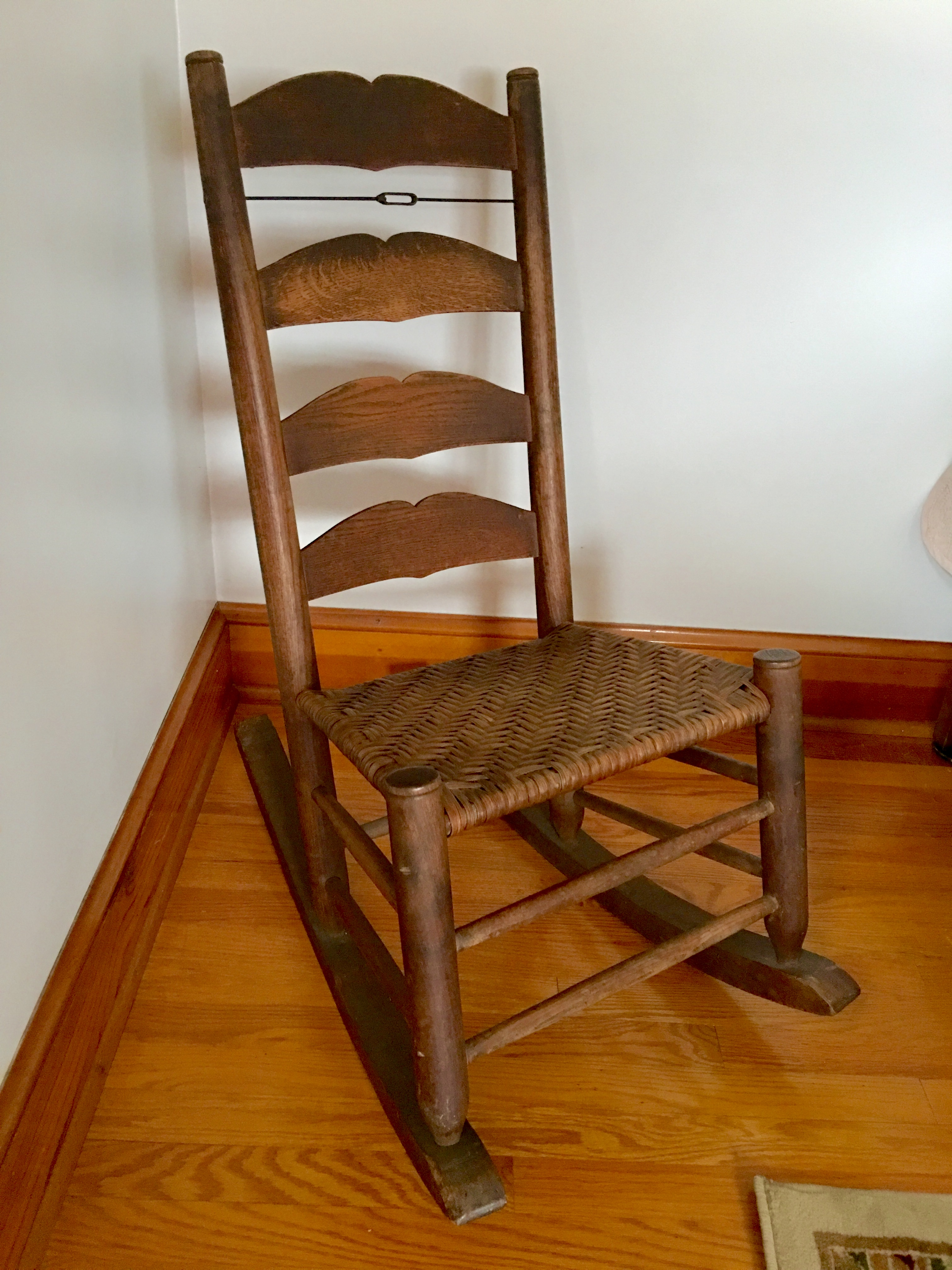
A sewing rocking chair made by Christopher Columbus Stottlemyer, displaying the characteristic scalloped back slats.

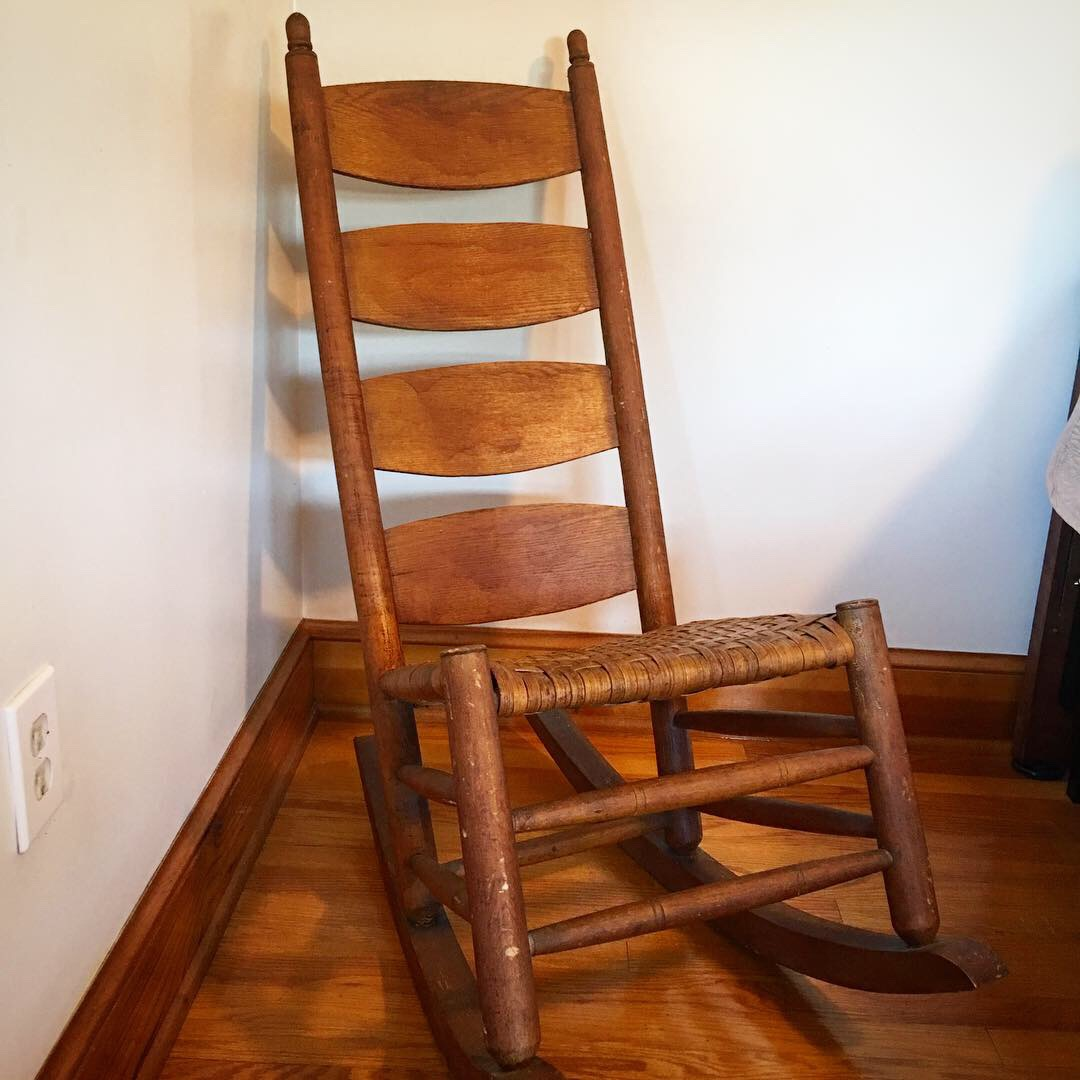
A sewing rocking chair made by Kelsey Alvey Gaver in Ellerton, Maryland, closely resembling the Stottlemyer style.

For eighty years, Wolfsville was a regional center of chair making, primary through the business operated by the Stottlemyer Family. In the decade prior to the American Civil War, Frederick Stottlemyer (1830–1913) established a shop and began turning Shaker-styled ladderback straight and rocking chairs. Frederick's son, Christopher Columbus Stottlemyer (1857–1931) apprenticed with his father and gradually assumed the management of the family's business, modernizing the production through the introduction of a steam powered lathe and sawmill, increasing the shop's output in the last quarter of the nineteenth century. Christopher Stottlemyer also developed many of the characteristic components for which Stottlemyer Chairs came to be recognized, including scalloped back slats and turned acorn-shaped finials on the back posts of the chairs. Stottlemyer chairs were mostly produced in three forms: straight chairs, sewing or nursing rockers (a rocking chair without arms), and armed rocking chairs. The shop also produced other furniture, including tables and cradles.

Following the death of Christopher Stottlemyer in 1931, the family business was purchased by Kelsey Alvey Gaver of nearby Ellerton who moved production to his family's farm along Catoctin Creek and began producing his own chairs, bearing strong resemblance to those made by his predecessors. Gaver was only in production for a decade before he was killed in action serving in the Pacific during World War II in June 1943.

Other furniture production in the Wolfsville area was carried on by the Marken and Gladhill families in the early and mid-nineteenth century.
