= Petersville, Maryland =

Unincorporated community in Maryland, United States

- Unincorporated community
- Location within Maryland
- Coordinates: 39°20′47″N 77°36′39″W
- Country: United States of America
- State: Maryland
- County: Frederick
- Elevation: 515 ft (157 m)
- Time zone: UTC-5 (Eastern (EST))
  - Summer (DST): UTC-4 (EDT)
- Area codes: 301 & 240
- GNIS feature ID: 586495

Petersville is an unincorporated community in Frederick County, Maryland, United States. Petersville is located at the junction of Maryland routes 79 and 180, 1.3 miles (2.1 km) northeast of Rosemont.

== History ==
The village of Petersville has a long and prominent heritage in the history of Frederick County and the State of Maryland. Located along a main east-west route which became the Harpers Ferry and Frederick Turnpike (later MD Route 180), Petersville grew as a stop along the turnpike with businesses to serve travelers as well as local farmers. The land on which Petersville is situated was originally patented by Captain John Colvill as the "Merryland Tract" on November 5, 1731, containing over 6,000 acres. Shortly after the Revolutionary War, Petersville began to develop as a village, with lots facing the turnpike route and four cross streets. The village also sat at the crossroads of one of the valley's north-south roads leading from Middletown to Berlin (today Brunswick). The 1808 Varle Map of Maryland shows Petersville. Five years later, in October 1813, the Petersville Post Office was established (it closed in 1909). The Maryland General Assembly established the Petersville District in 1829.

=== Historic Sites ===
- Barleywood - The farm house at Barleywood, constructed of logs, was erected around 1800. The historic farm was the site of a female school operated in the 1830s by Rev. R.H. Phillips under the auspices of St. Mark's Episcopal Parish.
- Howard Marvin Jones House - Built between 1914 and 1920, the Howard Marvin Jones House is an example of Colonial Revival Style constructed in an American Foursquare plan.
- Levin West House - The Wests were among the earliest families to settle in Petersville. The Levin West House, constructed of stone in the Federal style with later brick additions, was completed circa 1815. The grandson of the builder, Dr. Levin West, operated his medical practice in the house in the late 19th century.
- Methodist Episcopal Church/Faith Reformed Church - Governor Francis Thomas, who lived at Montevue, just south of Petersville, erected a two-story stone "town hall" for Petersville around 1850. The structure became the Methodist Episcopal Church of Petersville shortly before the Civil War and served that congregation until the 1890s. In 1900, the building was renamed Faith Reformed Church and operated as such until 1938, at which time it was converted to a residence.

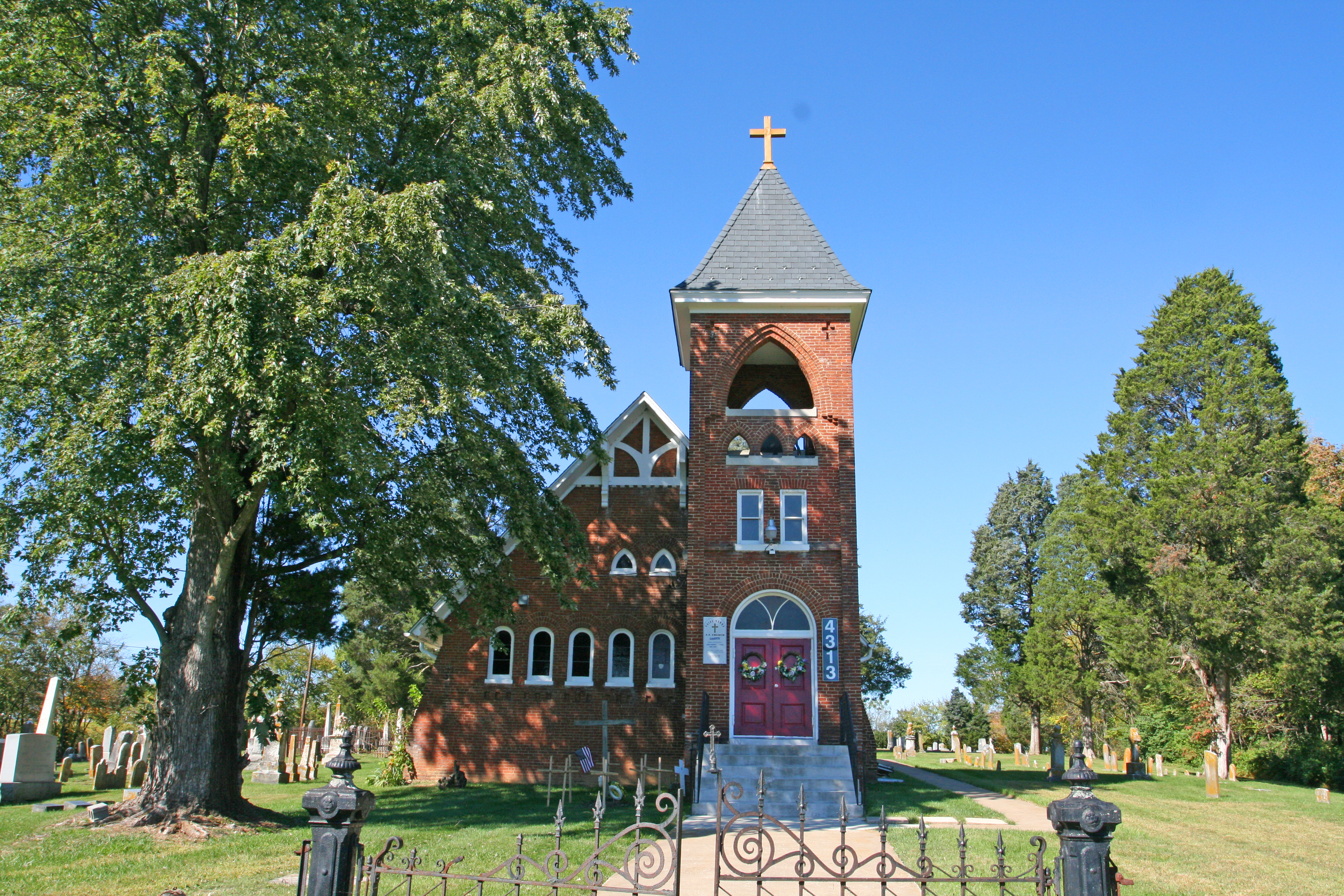
St. Mark's Episcopal Church in Petersville

- Mount O'Donnell - Originally named "Montevue," Mount O'Donnell was built in 1819 by Col. John Thomas, father of Francis Thomas, Governor of Maryland from 1842-1845. During the Maryland Campaign of 1862, Mount O'Donnell was used as a headquarters for Union offices while troops were encamped at Petersville. The home was sold by Governor Thomas in 1861 to General Columbus O'Donnell, at which time the name changed to Mount O'Donnell. The house is constructed of brick and is built in Federal style.
- Oakland - The land on which Oakland is situated was originally part of a large tract called "Hawkin's Merry Peep-O-Day," patented in 1753. The first house on the farm, described as a stone dwelling, was constructed by Dr. Grafton Duvall in the 1840s. The present Greek Revival styled house was erected in the 1850s by Horatio Claggett. The home remained in the Claggett Family well into the twentieth century.It was listed on the National Register of Historic Places in 2019.
- Petersville Luther Chapel - Lutheran services were started in Petersville by ministers from St. Paul's Lutheran Church in nearby Burkittsville as early as 1870. The congregation was organized on October 28, 1873, by which time work had already commenced on erecting a church. Petersville Luther Chapel was dedicated in 1874 and was constructed of brick and covered in stucco at a cost of $1,850.00.

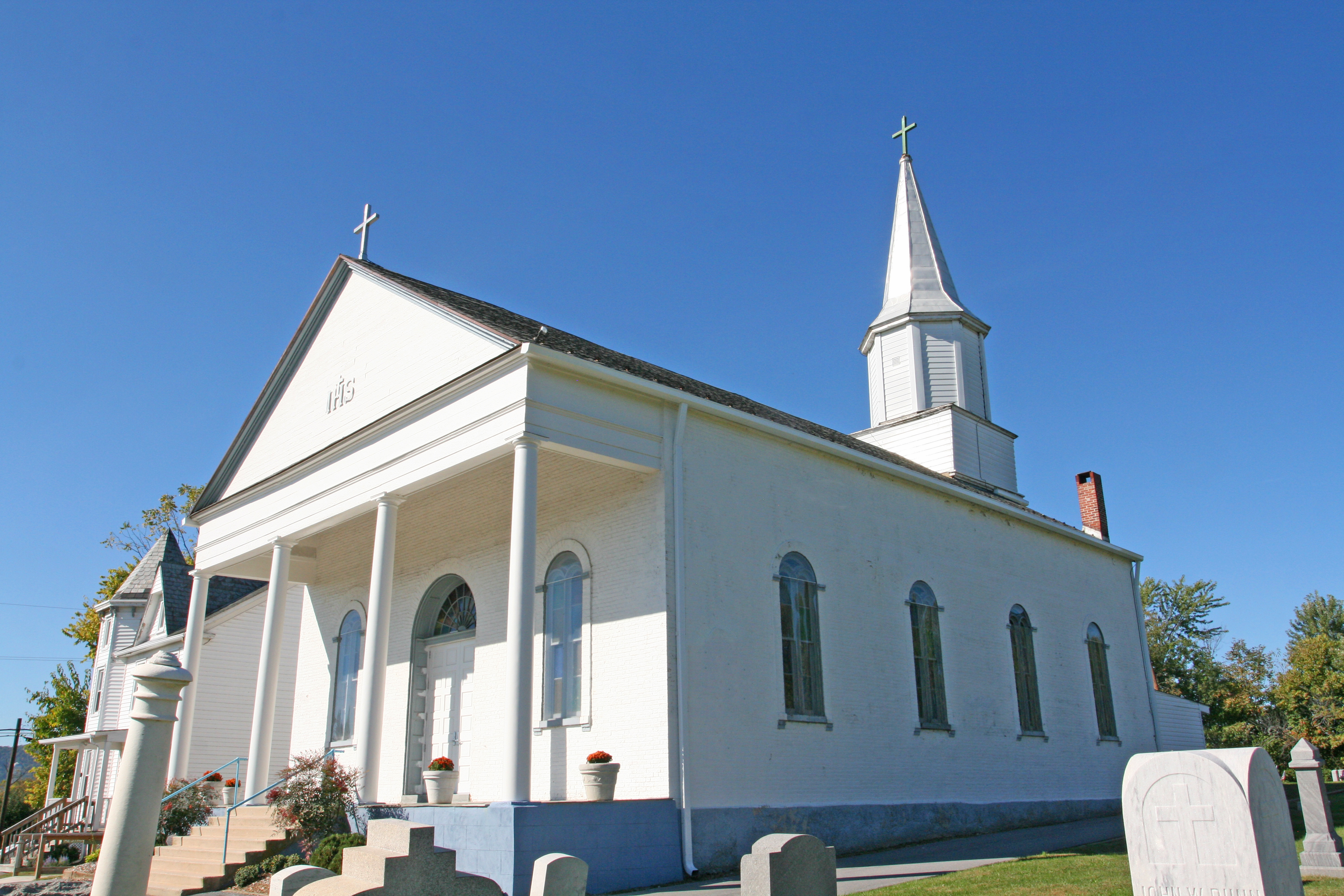
St. Mary's Roman Catholic Church in Petersville

- St. Mark's Episcopal Church - St. Mark's Parish was established in 1789 when the lower portion of the Middletown and Pleasant Valleys were separated from All Saints Parish. The parish church was placed in Petersville and the first vestry was elected in 1800. A frame or log church was erected on the site in 1807 and consecrated in 1819 by Bishop James Kemp. This church was replaced in 1830 with a brick structure which was consecrated in 1831 by Bishop William Stone. Under the pastorate of Rev. Edward Trail Helfenstein (later Bishop of the Diocese of Maryland), the parish expanded to encompass four churches (St. Mark's - Petersville; St. Luke's - Brownsville; St. John's - Burkittsville; and Grace - Brunswick). Rev. Helfenstein also led in the construction of the present St. Mark's Church, which was completed in 1891. The brick church displays both Gothic Revival and Romanesque style characteristics. St. Mark's Church closed in the mid-1960s and is used by an Apostolic congregation today. The surrounding churchyard contains several historic graves including Governor Francis Thomas, who lived near the church at "Montevue."
- St. Mary's Roman Catholic Church - St. Mary's Church was founded in the early 1820s, supported by a bequest from Maryland's second governor, Thomas Sim Lee, who lived nearby on the Needwood Estate. The brick church was constructed in 1845 by enslaved men and women from the Needwood Plantation, replacing an earlier log structure. The unique configuration of the church with the portico over the entrance and the bell tower at the back of the building may have been based on the second St. John the Evangelist Church in nearby Frederick. In 2016, the portico was restored with new Doric columns replacing mid-20th-century cement block piers. St. Mary's Church was the site of a parochial school for African American children, and a large part of its congregation has been historically black. St. Francis of Assisi Church in Brunswick was founded from St. Mary's in the 1890s.

== Notable people ==
- D. Charles Flook (died 1945), state delegate
