= Magnolia Plantation (Knoxville, Maryland) =

Historic house in Maryland, United States

- U.S. National Register of Historic Places
- Location within Maryland Location within the United States
- Location: Northwest of Knoxville off Sandy Hook Rd., Knoxville, Maryland
- Coordinates: 39°20′53″N 77°41′36″W
- Area: 185.7 acres (75.2 ha)
- Built: 1835
- Architectural style: Gothic Revival, Federal
- NRHP reference No.: 75000926
- Added to NRHP: June 18, 1975

Magnolia Plantation, also known as the Boteler-Holder Farm, is a historic house and former slave plantation located at Knoxville, Washington County, Maryland, United States. It is a 2-story, five-bay-wide house built about 1835, with a 1 1/2-story three-bay rear addition, set on finely coursed local fieldstone foundations. Also on the property are several modern outbuildings and a barn, and nearby is a private cemetery with a number of grave markers bearing the name Boteler.

The Magnolia Plantation was listed on the National Register of Historic Places in 1975.
