= Oakland (Knoxville, Maryland) =

- U.S. National Register of Historic Places
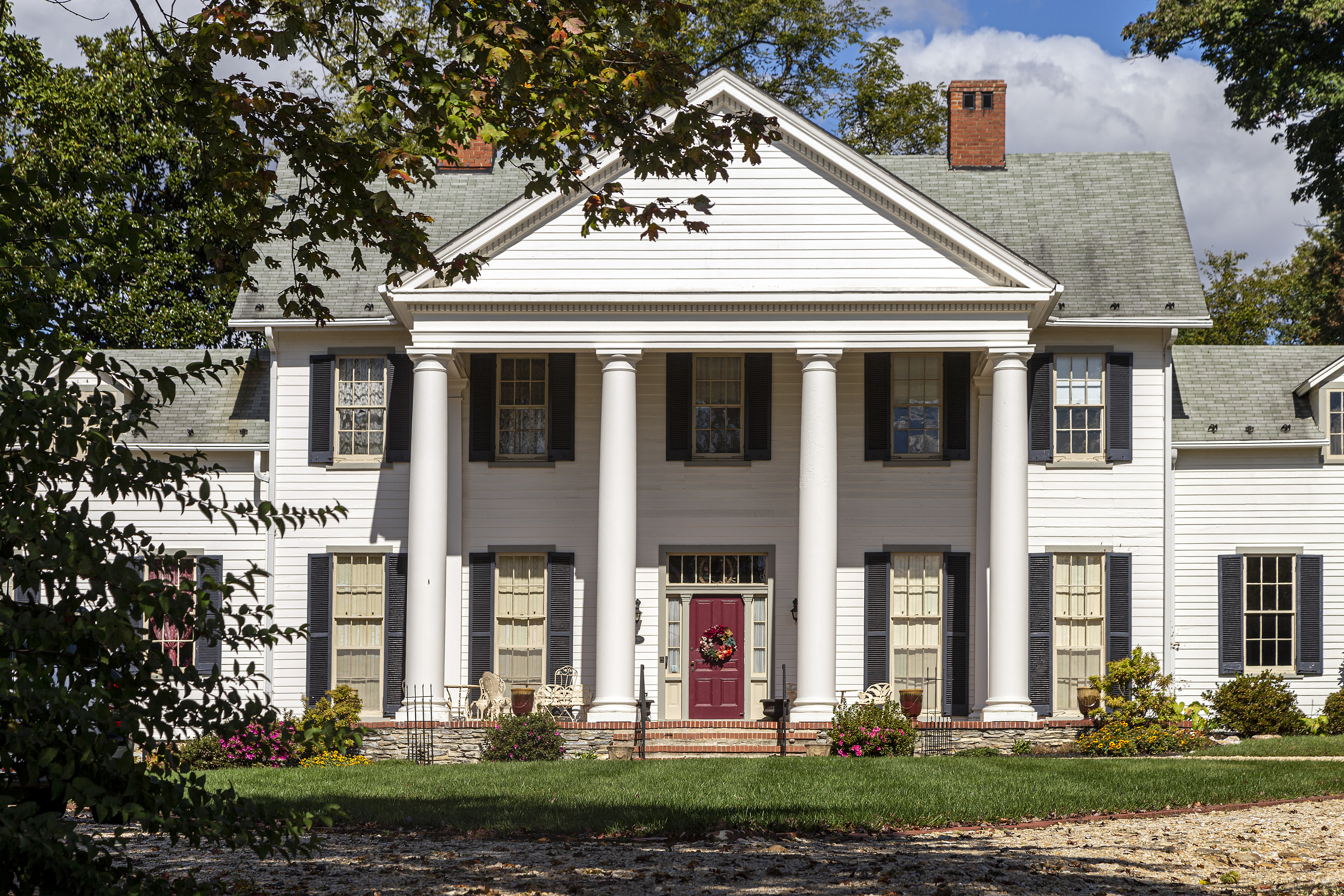
- Oakland, October 2020

- Location within Maryland Location within the United States
- Location: 1902 Jefferson Pike (MD 180), Petersville, Maryland
- Coordinates: 39°20′56″N 77°36′14″W
- Built: ca. 1856-1962
- Built by: Dr. Horatio Claggett
- NRHP reference No.: 100003656
- Added to NRHP: April 17, 2019

Oakland, now known as Crown Rose Estate, is a historic home and farm complex located near Petersville, Frederick County, Maryland. The house dates to the mid-19th century, and is a modified double-pile plan of two stories, with two 1 1/2-story wings, dated to 1935, extending from the sides of the house and a two-story rear ell. The front facade features a prominent portico of four Tuscan columns. Also on the property are a smokehouse, two springhouses, a cottage, a bank barn, and a Cold War-era bomb shelter.

It was listed on the National Register of Historic Places in 2019.
