= Robert Clagett Farm =

Historic house in Maryland, United States

- U.S. National Register of Historic Places
- Location within Maryland Location within the United States
- Nearest city: Knoxville, Maryland
- Coordinates: 39°21′6″N 77°41′3″W
- Area: 9.8 acres (4.0 ha)
- Built: 1775
- Architectural style: Georgian
- NRHP reference No.: 99000132
- Added to NRHP: February 5, 1999

The Robert Clagett Farm is a historic home and farm located at Knoxville, Washington County, Maryland, United States. The house is a one-story sandstone structure measuring three bays long by two bays deep in the Georgian-style. The house features a two-story galleried porch and an interior stone chimney. The farm also includes a small 1875 stone-arched bridge, a mid-19th century dairy barn, a small shed-roofed frame outbuilding which may once have housed pigs, and a 1930s frame garage.

The Robert Clagett Farm was listed on the National Register of Historic Places in 1999.
