= Maryland Route 383 =

State highway in Maryland, United States

Maryland Route 383
- Broad Run Jefferson Road
- Maryland Route 383 highlighted in red

Route information
- Maintained by MDSHA
- Length: 5.48 mi (8.82 km)
- Existed: 1930–present

Major junctions
- South end: MD 180 in Jefferson
- North end: MD 17 near Burkittsville

Location
- Country: United States
- State: Maryland
- Counties: Frederick

Highway system
- Maryland highway system; Interstate; US; State; Scenic Byways
← MD 382	→ MD 384

Maryland Route 383 (MD 383) is a state highway in the U.S. state of Maryland. Known as Broad Run Jefferson Road, the state highway runs 5.48 miles (8.82 km) from MD 180 in Jefferson north to MD 17 near Burkittsville. MD 383 was built in four sections from MD 17 toward Jefferson between 1929 and 1953.

== Route description ==
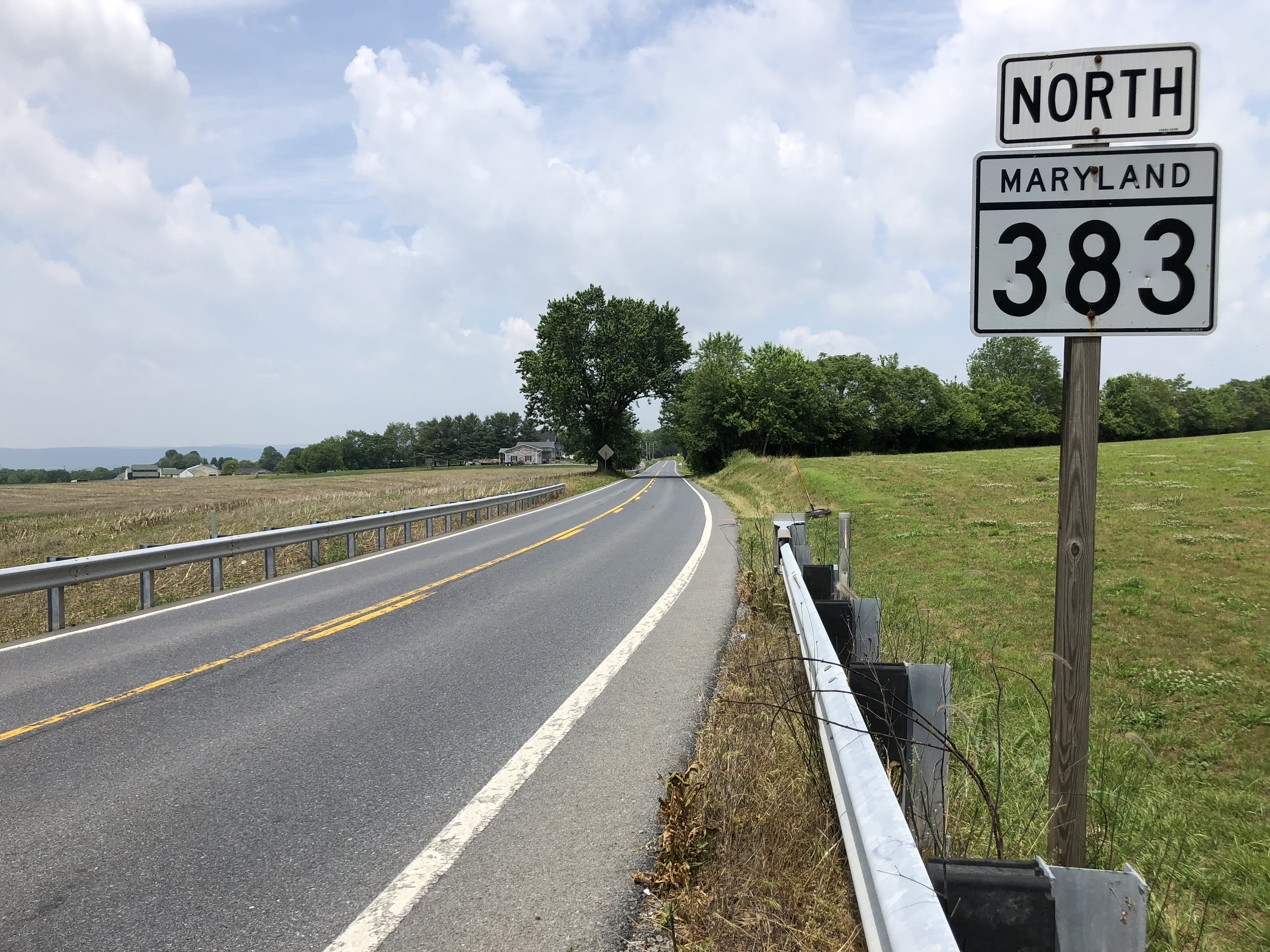
View north along MD 383 at MD 180 in Jefferson

MD 383 begins at a T intersection with MD 180 (Jefferson Pike) a short distance west of the center of Jefferson. The state highway heads northwest as a two-lane undivided road through farmland. MD 383 intersects Corun Road, which leads to the historic Lewis Mill Complex, before descending into the valley of and crossing Catoctin Creek. West of the creek, the state highway reaches a four-way intersection with south-facing St. Marks Road and Gapland Road, which heads west toward Burkittsville. MD 383 turns north to remain on Broad Run Road. The state highway passes Poffenberger Road and Sumantown Road as it veers west again. Poffenberger Road leads to the historic Poffenberger Road Bridge and Sumantown Road leads to the contemporary Catoctin Creek Park. MD 383 crosses a tributary of Broad Run and reaches another four-way intersection at the hamlet of Broad Run. Picnic Woods Road and Catholic Church Road head west and south, respectively, from the intersection. MD 383 turns north to its northern terminus at MD 17 (Burkittsville Road) about midway between Burkittsville and Middletown.

== History ==
The first portion of MD 383 was constructed as a concrete road from MD 33 (now MD 17) south to Broad Run in 1929 and 1930. The state highway was extended east as a macadam road to near the Poffenberger Road intersection in 1934 and 1935. By 1946, MD 383 was extended south and east to Catoctin Creek. The state highway was completed after the state route designation was extended to U.S. Route 340 (now MD 180) following the completion of a new bridge over Catoctin Creek in 1953.

== Junction list ==
The entire route is in Frederick County.

Location	mi	km	Destinations	Notes
Jefferson	0.00	0.00	MD 180 (Jefferson Pike) – Jefferson, Brunswick	Southern terminus
	5.48	8.82	MD 17 (Burkittsville Road) – Burkittsville, Middletown	Northern terminus
1.000 mi = 1.609 km; 1.000 km = 0.621 mi
