= Rosemont, Maryland =

- Village
- Village of Rosemont
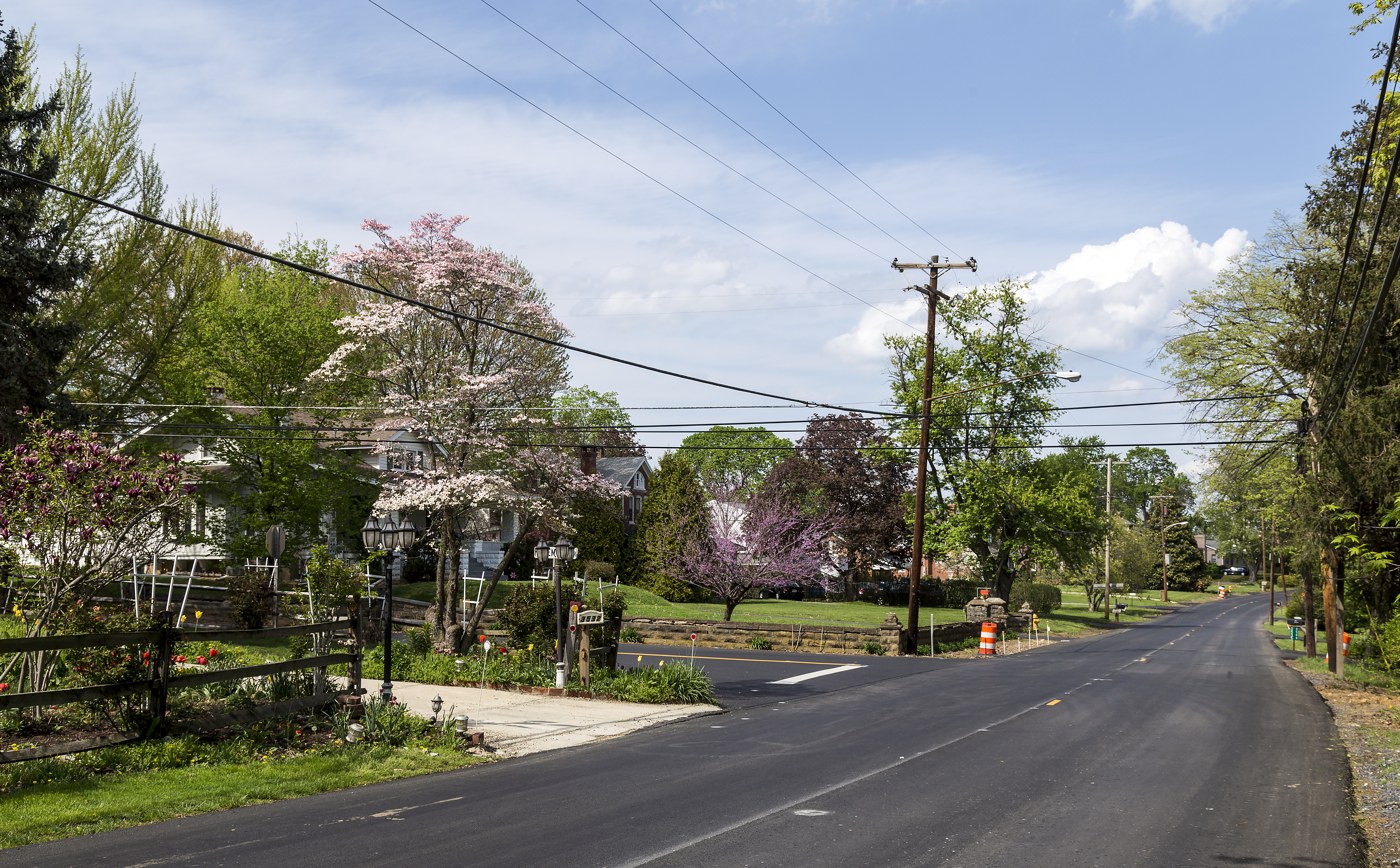
- Rosemont

- Seal

- Coordinates: 39°19′54″N 77°37′27″W
- Country: United States of America
- State: Maryland
- County: Frederick
- Incorporated: 1953

Government
  - Type: Municipality

Area
  - Total: 0.56 sq mi (1.44 km^{2})
  - Land: 0.56 sq mi (1.44 km^{2})
  - Water: 0 sq mi (0.00 km^{2})
- Elevation: 495 ft (151 m)

Population (2020)
  - Total: 272
  - Density: 489.0/sq mi (188.81/km^{2})
- Time zone: UTC-5 (Eastern (EST))
  - Summer (DST): UTC-4 (EDT)
- FIPS code: 24-68600
- GNIS feature ID: 2391099
- Website: sites.google.com/site/rosemontmd/

Rosemont is a village in Frederick County, Maryland, United States. The population was 272 at the 2020 census. Maryland state routes 79 and 871 pass through Rosemont.

== Geography ==
According to the United States Census Bureau, the village has a total area of 0.56 square miles (1.45 km^{2}), all land.

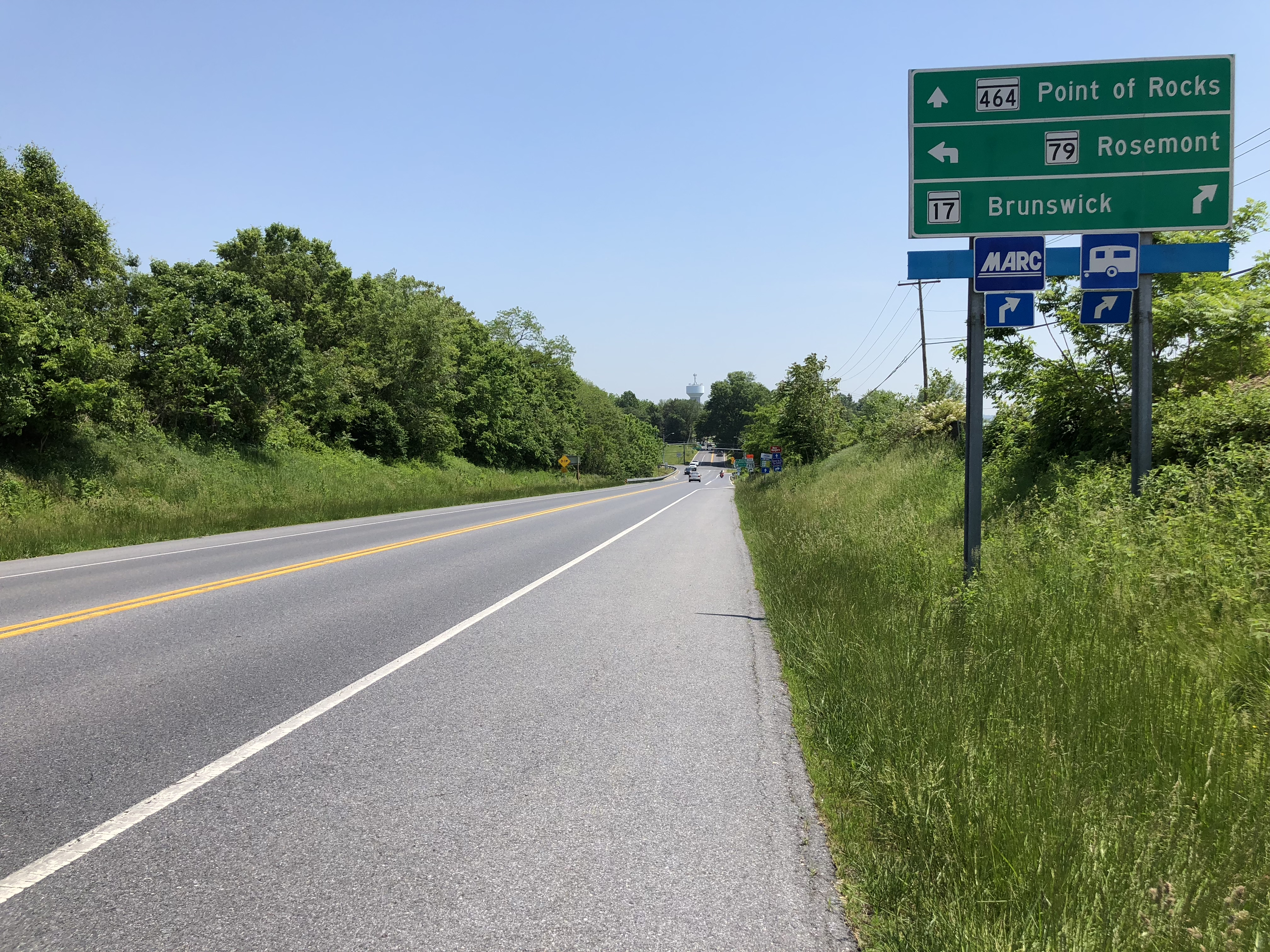
MD 17 southbound approaching its junction with MD 79 and MD 464 in Rosemont

== Transportation ==
The primary means of travel to and from Rosemont is by road. Despite its small size, the village is served by four separate state highways. The most prominent of these is Maryland Route 17, which skims the southwest side of the village. MD 17 continues southward to Brunswick and onward across the Potomac River to Virginia, where it becomes Virginia State Route 287. To the north, MD 17 interchanges with U.S. Route 340, then continues on to Burkittsville, Middletown and Myersville, where it interchanges with Interstate 70. Other state highways serving Rosemont include Maryland Route 79, Maryland Route 464 and Maryland Route 871.

== Demographics ==
Historical population
Census	Pop.	Note	%±
1960	212		—
1970	250		17.9%
1980	223		−10.8%
1990	256		14.8%
2000	273		6.6%
2010	294		7.7%
2020	272		−7.5%
U.S. Decennial Census

=== 2010 census ===
As of the census of 2010, there were 294 people, 114 households, and 84 families living in the village. The population density was 525.0 inhabitants per square mile (202.7/km^{2}). There were 118 housing units at an average density of 210.7 units per square mile (81.4 units/km^{2}). The racial makeup of the village was 92.9% White, 1.4% African American, 0.3% Asian, 0.3% Pacific Islander, 0.7% from other races, and 4.4% from two or more races. Hispanic or Latino of any race were 1.4% of the population.

There were 114 households, of which 22.8% had children under the age of 18 living with them, 58.8% were married couples living together, 9.6% had a female householder with no husband present, 5.3% had a male householder with no wife present, and 26.3% were non-families. 18.4% of all households were made up of individuals, and 10.6% had someone living alone who was 65 years of age or older. The average household size was 2.58 and the average family size was 2.93.

The median age in the village was 49.6 years. 14.6% of residents were under the age of 18; 8.2% were between the ages of 18 and 24; 19% were from 25 to 44; 38.4% were from 45 to 64; and 19.7% were 65 years of age or older. The gender makeup of the village was 49.3% male and 50.7% female.

=== 2000 census ===
As of the census of 2000, there were 273 people, 104 households, and 76 families living in the village. The population density was 488.3 inhabitants per square mile (188.5/km^{2}). There were 106 housing units at an average density of 189.6 units per square mile (73.2 units/km^{2}). The racial makeup of the village was 99.27% White, 0.37% African American and 0.37% Native American. Hispanic or Latino of any race were 0.37% of the population.

There were 104 households, out of which 26.0% had children under the age of 18 living with them, 63.5% were married couples living together, 8.7% had a female householder with no husband present, and 26.9% were non-families. 16.3% of all households were made up of individuals, and 10.6% had someone living alone who was 65 years of age or older. The average household size was 2.63 and the average family size was 3.04.

In the village, the population was spread out, with 19.8% under the age of 18, 5.9% from 18 to 24, 23.1% from 25 to 44, 31.9% from 45 to 64, and 19.4% who were 65 years of age or older. The median age was 46 years. For every 100 females, there were 88.3 males. For every 100 females age 18 and over, there were 87.2 males.

The median income for a household in the village was $59,750, and the median income for a family was $66,875. Males had a median income of $52,000 versus $31,806 for females. The per capita income for the village was $24,382. None of the families and 1.0% of the population were living below the poverty line, including none under eighteen and 4.2% of those over 64.

== Education ==
It is in Frederick County Public Schools.

School zoning is as follows: Valley Elementary School, Brunswick Middle School, Brunswick High School.
