= Knoxville, Maryland =

Unincorporated community in Maryland

- Unincorporated community
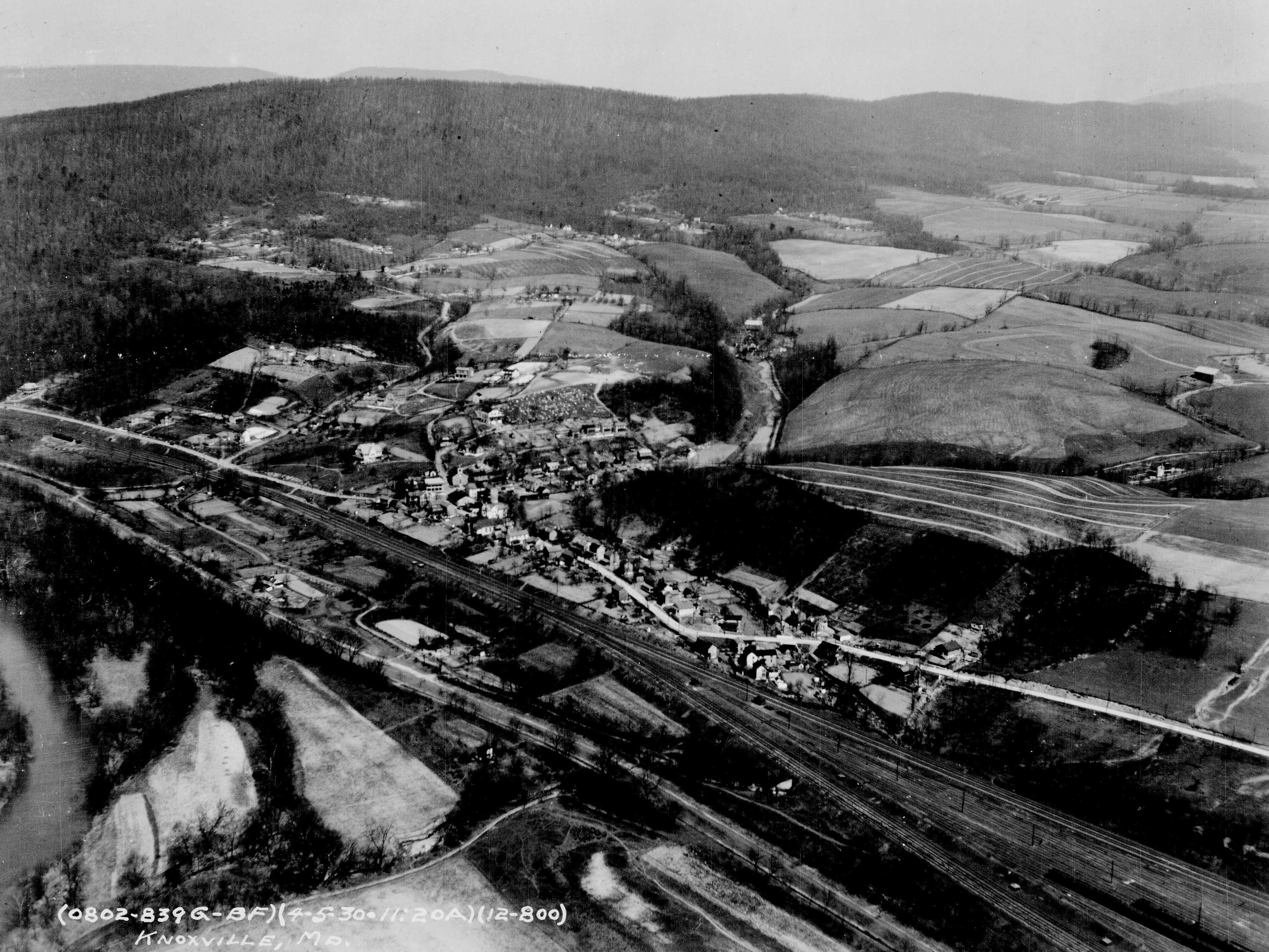
- Knoxville in April 1930

- Location in Maryland Knoxville (the United States)
- Coordinates: 39°19′37″N 77°39′51″W
- Country: United States of America
- State: Maryland
- County: Frederick
- Elevation: 282 ft (86 m)
- GNIS feature ID: 585333

Knoxville is an unincorporated community in Frederick and Washington counties, Maryland, United States. The Robert Clagett Farm and Magnolia Plantation are listed on the National Register of Historic Places.

== History ==
Knoxville is situated at the base of South Mountain directly beside the Potomac River to the immediate east of the water gap leading towards Harpers Ferry, West Virginia. The first settlers, English and German, began to populate the area in the latter half of the 18th century. By the early 19th century, a village began to form along the main road leading from Frederick, to Harpers Ferry, then the site of one of the two national armories in the United States. The coming of the Baltimore and Ohio Railroad, Chesapeake and Ohio Canal, and the establishment of the industrial town of Weverton to the immediate west fueled the growth of Knoxville in the 1840s.

In 1849, the Frederick Examiner newspaper reported that Knoxville was flourishing with new businesses and houses. Many of the vernacular and Greek Revival-styled buildings seen in the village today date from the 1840s and 1850s when the railroad, canal, and industry along the Potomac River contributed to Knoxville's growth. In 1851, a German Reformed congregation was founded in Knoxville and a new stone church erected atop Cemetery Hill. Despite the interruption of the Civil War, Knoxville continued to thrive as a local transportation hub throughout the third quarter of the 19th century. Two additional churches were established in the town during these years: a Methodist Episcopal Church in 1869 and a Lutheran church (removed from the village of Weverton) in 1873.

In 1890, the Baltimore and Ohio Railroad began construction of a massive rail yard in the village of Berlin, 2 miles (3 km) to the east. By 1894, Berlin was incorporated as Brunswick, and all industry and transportation activity shifted from Knoxville to the new city.

== Transportation ==
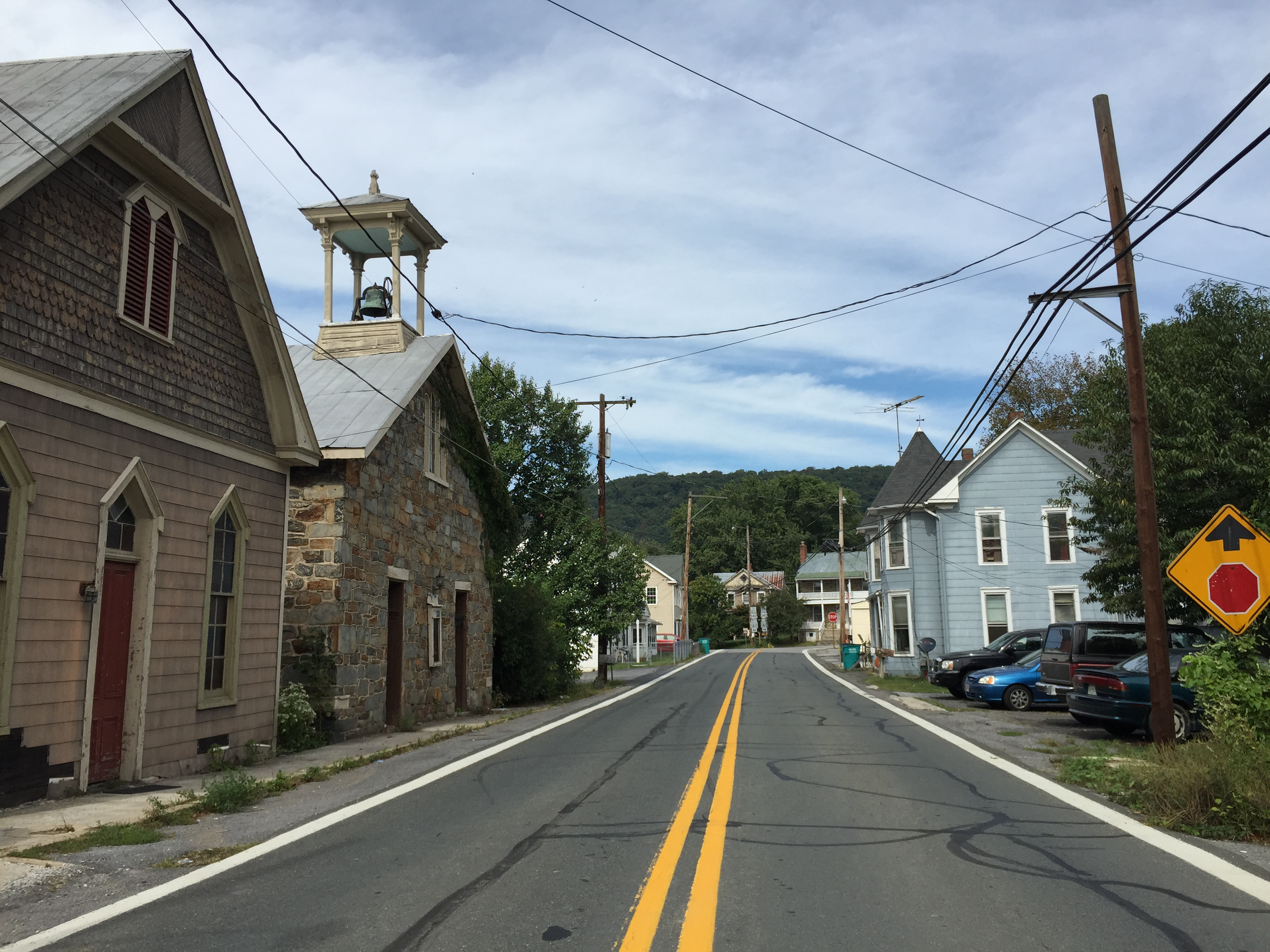
Maryland State Route 180 in Knoxville

Knoxville lies at the intersection of Route 180 and Knoxville Rd. U.S. Route 340 serves the community with westbound on and off ramps.

Transit operates the Brunswick / Jefferson shuttle in Knoxville.
