= Linden Grove (Frederick, Maryland) =

Historic house in Maryland, United States

- U.S. National Register of Historic Places
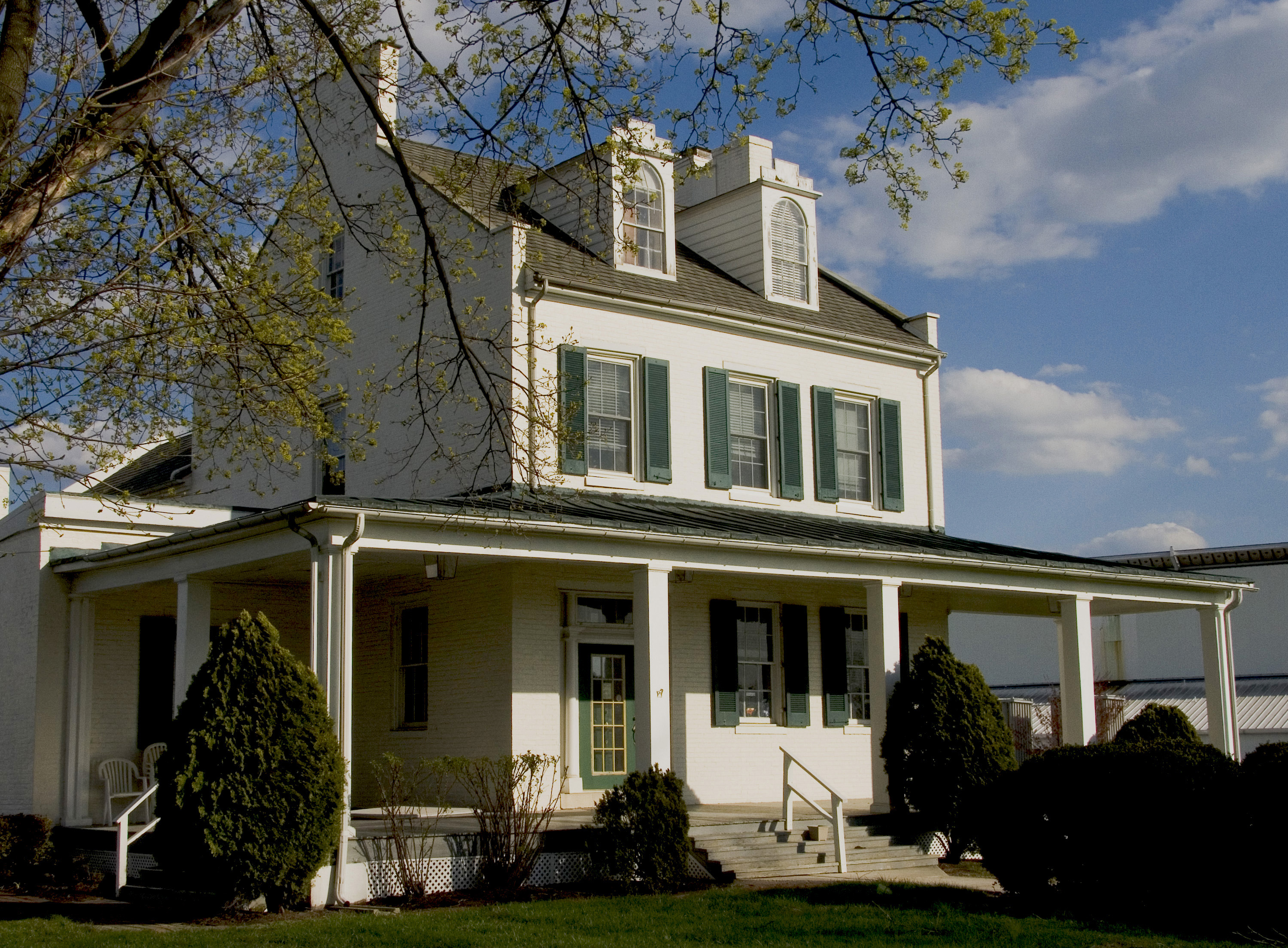

- Location within Maryland Location within the United States
- Location: 636 Solarex Court, Frederick, Maryland
- Coordinates: 39°24′2″N 77°26′1″W
- Area: 2.5 acres (1.0 ha)
- Built: 1823
- Architectural style: Greek Revival, Federal
- NRHP reference No.: 87001570
- Added to NRHP: September 10, 1987

Linden Grove is a historic home located at Frederick, Frederick County, Maryland, United States. It is a 2 1/2-story, second-quarter-19th-century transitional Federal-Greek Revival Flemish bond brick house. A porch was added to the house in about 1900. Outbuildings include a one-story stuccoed hip-roofed smokehouse and a mid-late 19th century two-story tenant house, with an addition from about 1930.

Linden Grove was listed on the National Register of Historic Places in 1987.
