= Middletown Valley =

- Catoctin Valley
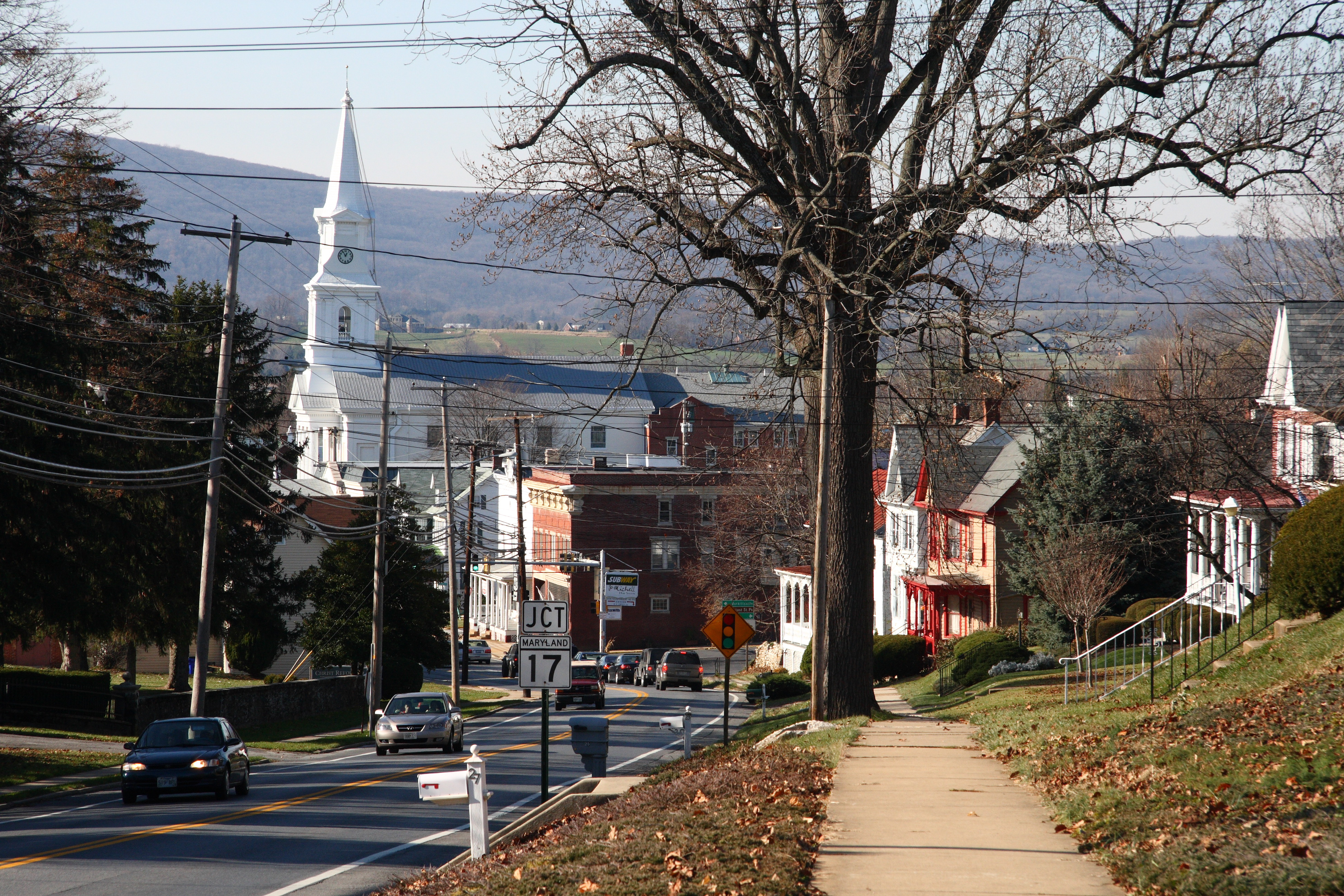
- Middletown, Maryland

- Location within Maryland
- Floor elevation: 479 ft (146 m)
- Length: 14 miles (23 km) North-South
- Width: 7 miles (11 km)

Geography
- Location: Frederick County, Maryland
- Population centers: Middletown; Brunswick
- Borders on: South Mountain (west); Catoctin Mountain (east); Potomac River (south); South Mountain/Catoctin Mountain convergence (north)
- Coordinates: 39°26′N 77°32′W
- Traversed by: Interstate 70, U.S. Route 40, U.S. Route 340
- Interactive map of Middletown Valley

The Middletown Valley, also historically known as Catoctin Valley, is a valley in western Frederick County in the state of Maryland.

== Geography ==
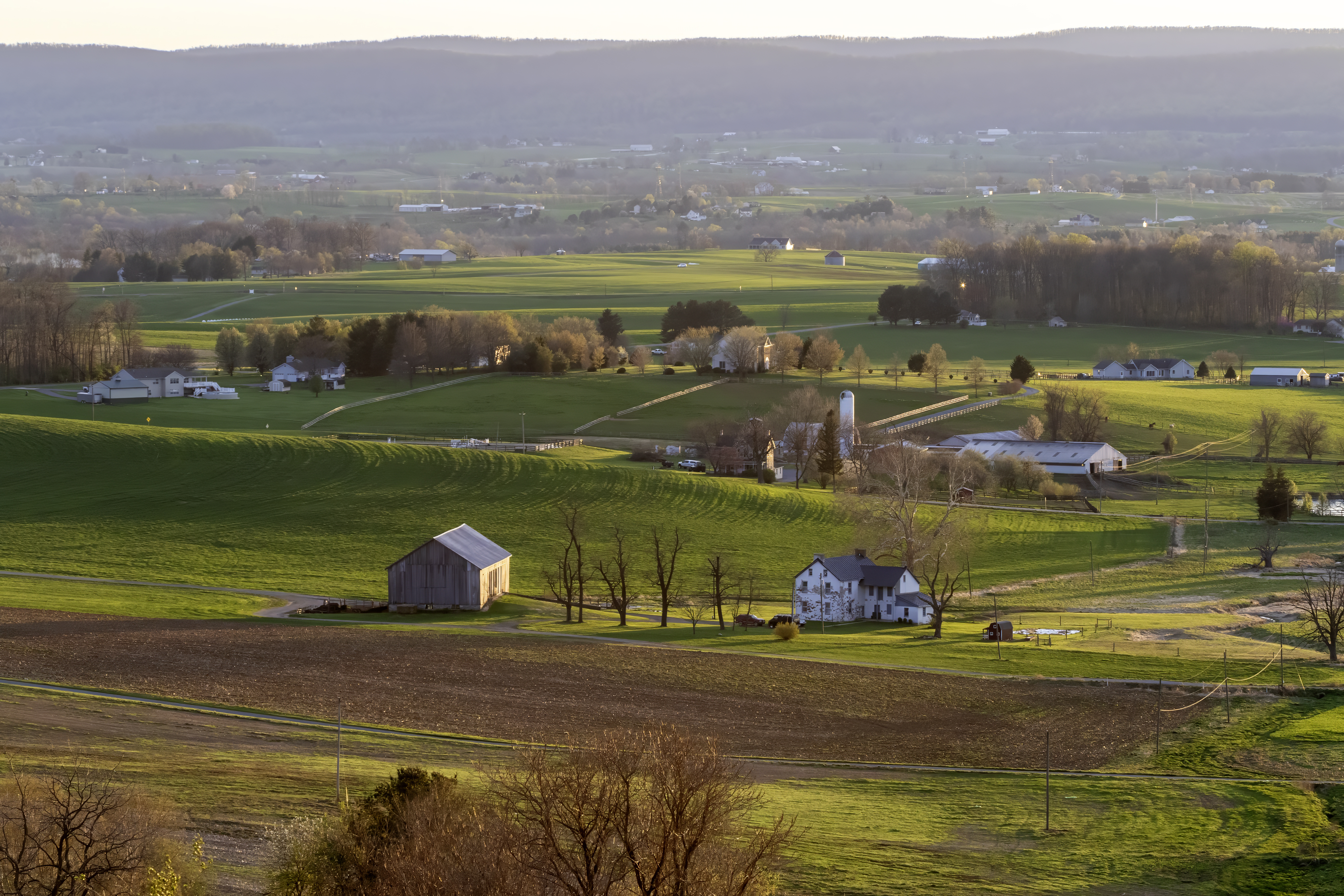
The John Coblentz Farm pictured in the Middletown Valley. The farm is listed on the Maryland Inventory of Historical Properties.

It is bound to the west by South Mountain, to the east by Catoctin Mountain, to the south by the Potomac River and to the north by the convergence of South Mountain and Catoctin Mountain, south of Quirauk Mountain. Geographically, it can be considered an extension of the Loudoun Valley which lies below the Potomac in Virginia. The valley derives its name from Middletown, the largest town in the Valley.

The use of the Catoctin Valley terminology was prevalent up through the American Civil War but afterwards was abandoned due to confusion between it and the northern portion of the Loudoun Valley also referred to as Catoctin Valley.
