= D. Charles Flook =

American politician (died 1945)

Member of the Maryland House of Delegates from the Frederick County district
- In office 1927–1935 Serving with Casper E. Cline Jr., Anderson H. Etzler, U. Grant Hooper, Lewis F. Kefauver, Harry W. LeGore, John D. Nicodemus, Grayson E. Palmer
- Preceded by: Alton Y. Bennett, Albert L. Hauver, Arthur F. Hightman, U. Grant Hooper, Lewis F. Kefauver
- Succeeded by: A. Lamar Barrick, George E. Castle, John B. Funk, Joseph B. Payne, Jacob R. Ramsburg
- In office 1916–1918 Serving with Edward S. Delaplaine, Howard D. Kefauver, R. Gassaway Molesworth, Millard F. Rice
- Preceded by: McGill Belt, August T. Brust, George A. Bussard, Markell H. Nelson, Eugene A. Wachter
- Succeeded by: Edward S. Delaplaine, Charles M. Kline, Grayson E. Palmer, Millard F. Rice, Frank L. Spitzer

Personal details
- Died: April 8, 1945 (aged 66) Brunswick, Maryland, U.S.
- Spouse: Neda D. Hemp (m. 1903)
- Children: 7
- Occupation: Politician; farmer

D. Charles Flook (died April 8, 1945) was an American politician from Maryland. He served as a member of the Maryland House of Delegates, representing Frederick County, from 1916 to 1918 and from 1927 to 1935.

== Career ==
Flook was a farmer near Petersville, Maryland.

Flook was a Republican. He served as a member of the Maryland House of Delegates, representing Frederick County, from 1916 to 1918 and from 1927 to 1935.

== Personal life ==
Flook married Neda D. Hemp, daughter of Clayton R. Hemp, of Jefferson on December 29, 1903, at St. Paul's Lutheran Church in Jefferson. They had seven children, including Evelyn, Nena Adele, William C., D. Charles Jr., Mrs. Charles S. Schrodel and Margaret H.

Flook died on April 8, 1945, aged 66, at Schnauffer Hospital in Brunswick.
