= 1895 Maryland Comptroller election =

- November 5, 1895

Nominee	Robert Patterson Graham	Marion deKalb Smith
Party	Republican	Democratic
Popular vote	122,627	106,990
Percentage	51.44%	44.88%
- County results Graham: 40–50% 50–60% Smith: 40–50% 50–60% Tie: 40–50%
Comptroller before election
Marion deKalb Smith
Democratic
Elected Comptroller
Robert Patterson Graham
Republican

The 1895 Maryland comptroller election was held on November 5, 1895, in order to elect the comptroller of Maryland. Republican nominee Robert Patterson Graham defeated Democratic nominee and incumbent comptroller Marion deKalb Smith, Prohibition nominee John D. Nicodemus and Independent candidate Samuel H. Gibson.

== General election ==
On election day, November 5, 1895, Republican nominee Robert Patterson Graham won the election by a margin of 15,637 votes against his foremost opponent Democratic nominee Marion deKalb Smith, thereby gaining Republican control over the office of comptroller. Graham was sworn in as the 16th comptroller of Maryland on January 8, 1896.

=== Results ===
Maryland Comptroller election, 1895
Party	Candidate	Votes	%
Republican	Robert Patterson Graham	122,627	51.44
Democratic	Marion deKalb Smith (incumbent)	106,990	44.88
Prohibition	John D. Nicodemus	7,326	3.07
Independent	Samuel H. Gibson	1,448	0.61
Total votes		238,391	100.00
Republican gain from Democratic			
