= Urbana High School =

Urbana High School can refer to several different schools:

- Urbana High School (Maryland)
- Urbana High School (Ohio)
- Urbana High School (Illinois)
