= Brunswick High School (Maryland) =

Location
- 101 Cummings Drive; Brunswick, Maryland 21716; United States; 39.3158°N 77.6080°W

Information
- Type: Public high school
- Established: 1911
- School district: Frederick County Public Schools
- Principal: Eric Schwarzenegger
- Teaching staff: 40.50 (FTE)
- Grades: 9–12
- Enrollment: 797 (2020–21)
- Student to teacher ratio: 19.56
- Campus: Rural
- Campus size: 50.30 acres (203,600 m^{2})
- Colors: Garnet and gold
- Mascot: Railroader
- Website: Brunswick HS Website

Brunswick High School (BHS) is an American public high school located in Brunswick, Frederick County, Maryland, United States. The school serves the communities of Brunswick, Burkittsville, Jefferson, Knoxville, Petersville, Point of Rocks, and Rosemont. There have been plans to demolish the current building and to build a new high school nearby.

== Overview ==
The school is near the Virginia border near the Potomac River, just off of Maryland Route 464, and a couple miles southeast of U.S. Route 340.

The current building was constructed in 1965. The building has 79,743 square feet (7,408.4 m^{2}) of space on 50.3 acres (20.4 ha) of land. There are two gymnasiums, and a vocational technology wing including auto mechanics. Brunswick High School has the distinction of being the only school in Frederick County besides CTC with an automechanical program. The original Brunswick High School was built on 4th Avenue around 1911, but it burned down in 1928.

== Students ==
Brunswick High School's graduation rate has been very high over the past 12 years. In 2007 the school graduated 97.04%, though it peaked in 2004 at 98.82% and had a low of 92.99% in 2000.

=== Demographics ===
Brunswick's demographic breakdown is as follows:

| Ethnicity | % of population |
|---|---|
| Asian | 1.7% |
| African American | 5.7% |
| Hispanic | 8.9% |
| White | 77.4% |
| Two or More Races | 6.1% |
| Total Minority Enrollment | 22.6% |

=== Population ===
The school's enrollment grew between 1993 and 2003, declining to a low enrollment point in 2014 before expanding again.

Student population
| 1993 | 571 |
| 1994 | 604 |
| 1995 | 657 |
| 1996 | 657 |
| 1997 | 757 |
| 1998 | 803 |
| 1999 | 813 |
| 2000 | 835 |
| 2001 | 888 |
| 2002 | 940 |
| 2003 | 972 |
| 2004 | 928 |
| 2005 | 893 |
| 2006 | 859 |
| 2007 | 836 |
| 2008 | 829 |
| 2009 | 827 |
| 2010 | 829 |
| 2011 | 774 |
| 2012 | 773 |
| 2013 | 721 |
| 2014 | 686 |
| 2015 | |
| 2016 | 753 |
| 2017 | |
| 2018 | |
| 2019 | |
| 2020 | |
| 2021 | 797 |
| 2022 | 848 |
| 2023 | 862 |
| 2024 | 879 |
| 2025 | 910 |

== Music ==
=== Marching Band ===
The Brunswick High Marching Railroaders compete in the Maryland Marching Band Association. In previous years, they competed in the Tournament of Bands Circuit.

Awards and Recognitions:

- TOB Region 5 Champions - 2013–2019
- Tax Slayer Bowl Game Half-time: 2016

=== Indoor Percussion ===
In combination with Tuscarora High School, to make Western Frederick Indoor Percussion, they compete in the Keystone Indoor Drill Association (KIDA).

Awards:

- 2013 - Gold Class Indoor Percussion champions (as Brunswick High School)
- 2015 - White Class Indoor Percussion Champions (as Western Frederick)

=== Indoor Color Guard ===
In combination with Tuscarora High School, to make Western Frederick Indoor Color Guard, they compete in the Keystone Indoor Drill Association (KIDA).

== Sports ==
State Champions

- 2021 - Boys' Soccer
- 2021 - Boys' Cross Country
- 2016 - Boys' Baseball
- 2015 - Boys' Baseball
- 2014 - Boys' Soccer
- 2013 - Unified Bocce
- 2012 - Boys' Soccer
- 1996 - Baseball
- 1996 - Girls' Basketball
- 1993 - Girls' Cross Country
- 1992 - Baseball
- 1992 - Girls' Cross Country
- 1991 - Baseball
- 1991 - Girls' Cross Country
- 1990 - Baseball
- 1990 - Boys' Soccer
- 1989 - Boys' Cross Country
- 1985 - Girls' Cross Country
- 1983 - Girls' Cross Country
- 1983 - Girls' Track & Field
- 1982 - Girls' Cross Country
- 1977 - Boys' Basketball
- 1966 - Boys' Cross Country
- 1965 - Boys' Cross Country
- 1948 - Boys' Cross Country
- 1947 - Boys' Cross Country
- 1946 - Boys' Cross Country

== Notable alumni ==
- Jake Ewald (born 1993), American musician, founding member of emo band Modern Baseball and indie folk band Slaughter Beach, Dog.
- John B. Funk (1905–1993), member of the Maryland House of Delegates and Maryland Senate, Secretary of State of Maryland
- Brooke Grossman (born 1978), member of the Maryland House of Delegates
- Bren Lukens (born 1992), American musician, founding member of emo band Modern Baseball.
- Joseph B. Payne (died 1968), member of the Maryland House of Delegates

== See also ==
- List of high schools in Maryland
- Frederick County Public Schools
