= Richard G. Molesworth =

American politician (1862–1938)

Member of the Maryland House of Delegates from the Frederick County district
- In office 1916–1918 Serving with Edward S. Delaplaine, D. Charles Flook, Howard D. Kefauver, Millard F. Rice
- Preceded by: McGill Belt, August T. Brust, George A. Bussard, Markell H. Nelson, Eugene A. Wachter
- Succeeded by: Edward S. Delaplaine, Charles M. Kline, Grayson E. Palmer, Millard F. Rice, Frank L. Spitzer
- In office 1912–1914 Serving with Peter L. Hargett, Howard D. Kefauver, Emory C. Remsburg, William O. Wertenbaker
- Preceded by: Clement C. Ausherman, John C. Castle, Peter L. Hargett, James P. Harris, William O. Wertenbaker
- Succeeded by: McGill Belt, August T. Brust, George A. Bussard, Markell H. Nelson, Eugene A. Wachter

Personal details
- Born: Richard Gassaway Molesworth; April 1862
- Died: October 12, 1938 (aged 76) Baltimore, Maryland, U.S.
- Resting place: Prospect Cemetery near Mount Airy, Maryland, U.S.
- Party: Republican
- Spouse: Addie Baker
- Children: 1
- Occupation: Politician; businessman

Richard Gassaway Molesworth (April 1862 – October 12, 1938) was an American politician from Maryland. He served as a member of the Maryland House of Delegates, representing Frederick County, from 1912 to 1914 and from 1916 to 1918.

== Early life ==
Richard Gassaway Molesworth was born in April 1862 to Ruth (née Condon) and William Molesworth. He grew up on the Molesworth farm in Woodville district.

== Career ==
Molesworth was a Republican. He served as a member of the Maryland House of Delegates, representing Frederick County, from 1912 to 1914 and from 1916 to 1918.

After his legislative career, Molesworth ran a store in Mount Airy. He then worked at the Camden station of the Baltimore and Ohio Railroad.

== Personal life ==
Molesworth married Addie Baker of Kemptown. They had one son, William. He lived for a time in Mount Airy.

Molesworth died on October 12, 1938, at his home on Poplar Grove Street in Baltimore. He was buried in Prospect Cemetery near Mount Airy.
