= Frederick County Public Schools (Maryland) =

School district in Maryland, United States

Address
- 191 South East Street Frederick, Maryland, 21701; United States
- Coordinates: 38°52′7.08″N 77°13′30.48″W

District information
- Type: Public
- Grades: Pre-K through 12
- Established: 1889; 137 years ago
- Superintendent: Cheryl Dyson
- Schools: 69
- NCES District ID: 2400330

Students and staff
- Students: 47,681 (2023-24)▲
- Teachers: 3,057 (2023-24)▲
- Staff: 7,031 (2023-24)▲
- Student–teacher ratio: 15.59 (2023-24)▼

Other information
- Website: www.fcps.org

Frederick County Public Schools (FCPS) is a public school system serving the residents of Frederick County, Maryland. The system includes several schools to serve the educational needs of the youth in Frederick and the surrounding areas of Frederick County.

== Staff ==
Frederick County Public Schools District staff members, spread throughout the district's sixty-nine schools and central office, totaled a number of 5,763 in the 2021–2022 school year. Out of the 5,763 staff members, 2,889 were teachers and 2,874 were classified as other staff members. There were 153 school guidance counselors throughout the district. There were 758 instructional aides in the district to assist in the academic setting. In the district administration side of staffing, there were 181 district administrators and 115 district administrative support working in the system in an administrative capacity. In the school administrative side, there were 195 school administrators working in the district which includes principals and assistant principals. 302 members of staff were classified as school administrative support.

Current Board of Education
Name	Position	Current Elected Term
Dean Rose	President	December 2022-December 2026
Rae Gallagher	Vice President	December 2022-December 2026
Chad Wilson	Member	January 2026- December 2026
Colt Black	Member	December 2024-December 2028
Jaime Brennan	Member	December 2024-December 2028
Janie Inglis Monier	Member	December 2024-December 2028
Karen Yoho	Member	December 2022-December 2026
Thora Mintz	Student Member	July 2026-June 2027

Frederick County teachers are represented by the Frederick County Teachers Association (FCTA), a local union, led by Missy Dirks.

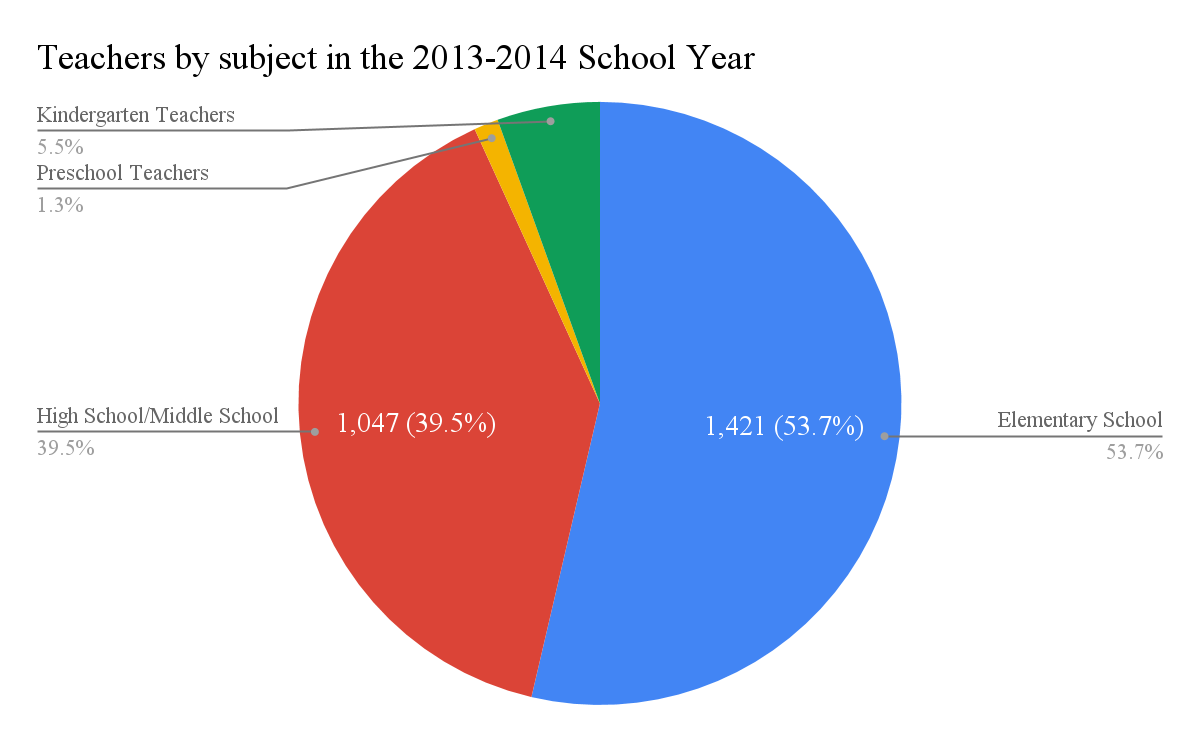
Graph of FCPS Teachers by grade

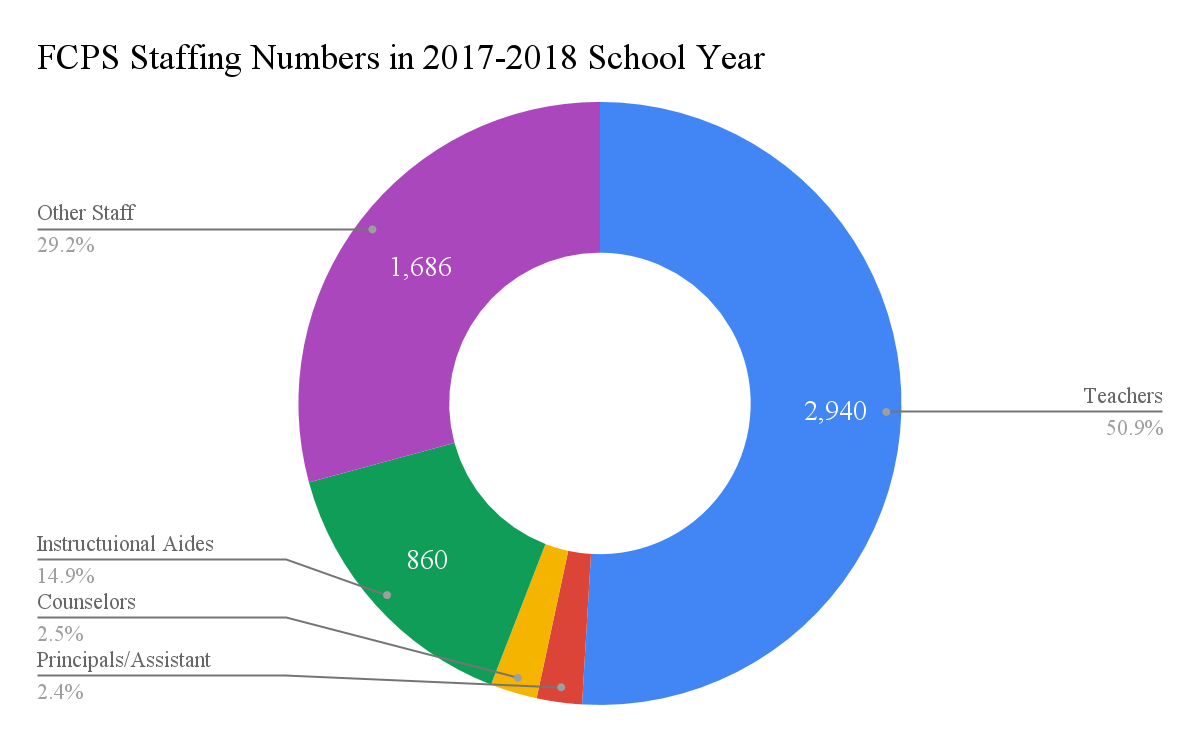
FCPS Staffing 2017-2018 School Yr

== Budget ==
Per the 2022 to 2023 approved operating budget, Frederick County Public Schools total budget is $822,836,251; the 2026 initial board-approved budget was $989 million. Budget calculations begin with a baseline "maintenance of effort" value relating the minimum per-pupil funding required (based on state law requirements) which was determined to be $955 million for 2026. The funds are provided by Frederick County, in the amount of $365.3 million ($437 million for 2025 fiscal year); the State of Maryland in the amount of $365.7 million; the Federal Government in the amount of $71.2 million; plus addition funds (including unspent prior year funds) in the amount of $20.6 million.

A contributing factor to budget calculations has been the Blueprint for Maryland's Future legislation passed in 2020 that mandates a minimum starting teacher salary of $60,000 in 2026. A second contributing factor has been the ongoing desire to decrease the student-to-teacher ratio, which stood between 15 and 16 during the 2023-24 school year. For instance, two classes at Centerville Elementary (Urbana) were running at 33 students in 2025, twice the county average.

The county had expenditures or costs of $59,215,000 or $4,545 per student on average for the 2013-14 FY. Expenditure spending is spread around to Current Expenditures, Total Capital Outlay, Total Non- El-Sec Education, and to Interest on Debt owed by the county. Current expenditures cost in total $521,143,000 and of those costs most are spent on students and staff which are marked as Instructional Expenditures and totaled $327,061,000 or about 63% of the Current Expenditure total. Student and Staff support made up $58,314,000 while Administration costs made up $48,858,000 of the Current Expenditure budget. Food Services/Operations cost $86,910,000 and is a part of the Current Expenditures budget. Total Capital Outlay cost $51,559,000. From that amount, $45,421,000 was used in construction cost such as for building new schools. Total Non-El-Sec education and others cost $1,053,000. Interest on debt owed by the school district cost $71,000 in the 3093-11 FY.

== Demographics ==
The Frederick County Public Schools student population as of the 2023–2024 school year was 47,681 students (▲) across grades PreK – 12. On a racial breakdown of the student population, there were in the district 23,373 Caucasian students (▼; 49%); 3,740 Asian students (▲; 8%); 6,915 African American students (▲; 14½%); 10,054 Latino students (▲; 21%); 114 Alaskan Native or American Indian (▲; <1%); 64 Pacific Islanders (▲; <1%); and 3,421 students of two or more races (▲; 7%). On a breakdown by gender, 24,404 students were male (51%) and 23,246 students were female (49%). The overall attendance rate was 93.8%. The county had an overall 2024 graduation rate of 94% (▲) Graduation rates varied for different demographic groups: Caucasian and Asian students achieved >95% graduation rates; African American, Amerindian and Alaskan, and mixed race students had >90% graduation rates; Hispanic and Pacific Islander students showed a >80% graduation rate.

Initial enrollment for the 2017- 2018 school year was up by 826 students over the prior year to 42,204 students. Eleven thousand students in the FCPS were eligible for free or reduced-price meals or about 27% of the student population. About 4,910 students were receiving Special Education support and services. The number of students that do not speak English as a primary language in the school district numbered as 2,388 students. Student demographics for FCPS in the 2017- 2018 school year show that the county is composed of a new racial breakdown of White 26,082 students, 6,541 Hispanic/Latino students, 5,022 African American students, 2,236 Asian students, American Indian/Alaskan Natives and Pacific Islanders made up 253 students. A little over two thousand students were considered of two or more races. This is a slight shift in the new numbers from previous years.

== School Recognition and Awards ==
Seven out of the ten of Frederick County high schools have been recognized by the U.S. News & World Report High School Rankings and have been awarded silver medals. The highest-ranked school in the county is Urbana High School in Ijamsville. Urbana HS is ranked 15th in the state of Maryland and 550 in National rankings, with a 98% graduation rate and 54.3 College readiness level, and 68% of students participate in Advanced Placement classes. Urbana HS is 50% Male and 50% female and a minority enrollment rate of 32%. The second highest ranked high school in the county was Middletown High School in Middletown, which is ranked 21st in the state and 744th in the nation. Middletown has a college readiness level of 49.2 and 64% of students participate in AP programs.

Frederick County also has multiple Blue-Ribbon schools. Kemptown Elementary School in Monrovia was awarded the National Blue-Ribbon Award in 2015 in the category of Exemplary High Performing Schools. Centerville Elementary School in Frederick was awarded the National Blue-Ribbon award in 2017 also in the category of Exemplary High Performing Schools. Centerville has over 1,000 students and PARCC (Partnership for Assessment of Readiness for College and Careers) testing proficiency scores of 82.4% in math and 77% in language arts. The state of Maryland also has awarded Frederick county schools in sustainability initiatives. Four Frederick County public schools are certified as Maryland Green Schools as administered by the Maryland Association for Environmental and Outdoor Education. Frederick County Public Schools was also the 1st Maryland school district to adapt a goal to increase tree canopy on all properties from 12% to 20% over the next thirty years.

== DOJ investigation ==
On Wednesday, December 1, 2021 The Department Of Justice released a document detailing the seclusion tactics utilized by teachers and staff in FCPS. These seclusion techniques involved placing a student in a room for twenty-nine minutes at a time, taking them out then placing them right back in seclusion for another twenty-nine minutes. This could be repeated twelve times or more. Throughout the two and a half years FCPS was investigated, thousands of seclusion incidents were recorded. 99% of the students affected were classified as having disabilities.

After the release of the DOJ document, many parents spoke out about the mistreatment of their children. The superintendent at the time, Dr. Terry Alban, was placed on administrative leave, and after public pressure, retired. Eventually, FCPS and the DOJ reached a settlement. This settlement included hiring behavioral analysts and providing trauma therapy to students affected. The total cost is predicted to exceed four million dollars.

On July 1, 2022, a new law preventing seclusion in schools took effect in the State of Maryland. This law, springing up in the aftermath of this investigation, makes it completely illegal to seclude students in public schools. While seclusion will still be legal in private schools, It will be subject to a great deal of scrutiny.

== High schools ==
- Brunswick High School
- Catoctin High School
- Frederick County MD Virtual High School
- Frederick High School
- Governor Thomas Johnson High School
- Lincoln High School, defunct; former segregated High School for Black students.
- Linganore High School
- Middletown High School
- Oakdale High School
- Tuscarora High School
- Urbana High School
- Walkersville High School

== Middle schools ==
- Ballenger Creek Middle, Frederick
- Brunswick Middle, Brunswick
- Crestwood Middle, Frederick
- Governor Thomas Johnson Middle, Frederick
- Middletown Middle, Middletown
- Monocacy Middle, Frederick
- New Market Middle, New Market
- Thurmont Middle, Thurmont
- Oakdale Middle, Ijamsville
- Urbana Middle, Ijamsville
- Walkersville Middle, Walkersville
- West Frederick Middle, Frederick
- Windsor Knolls Middle, Ijamsville

== Elementary schools ==
- Ballenger Creek Elementary, Frederick
- Blue Heron Elementary, Frederick
- Brunswick Elementary, Brunswick
- Butterfly Ridge Elementary, Frederick
- Carroll Manor Elementary, Adamstown
- Centerville Elementary, Urbana
- Deer Crossing Elementary, New Market
- Emmitsburg Elementary, Emmitsburg
- Glade Elementary, Walkersville
- Green Valley Elementary, Monrovia (Original location constructed in 1971; new relocated facility constructed in 2025)
- Hillcrest Elementary, Frederick
- Kemptown Elementary, Monrovia
- Lewistown Elementary, Thurmont
- Liberty Elementary, Frederick
- Lincoln Elementary, Frederick
- Linganore Creek Elementary School (LCES; aka Elementary School #41), constructed 2026
- Middletown Elementary, Middletown
- Middletown Primary, Middletown
- Monocacy Elementary, Frederick
- Monocacy Valley, Frederick (Charter School)
- Myersville Elementary, Myersville
- New Market Elementary, New Market
- New Midway/Woodsboro Elementary, Keymar
- North Frederick Elementary, Frederick
- Oakdale Elementary, Ijamsville
- Orchard Grove Elementary, Frederick
- Parkway Elementary, Frederick
- Spring Ridge Elementary, Frederick
- Sugarloaf Elementary, Frederick
- Thurmont Elementary, Thurmont
- Thurmont Primary, Thurmont
- Tuscarora Elementary, Frederick
- Twin Ridge Elementary, Mt. Airy
- Urbana Elementary, Frederick
- Valley Elementary, Jefferson
- Walkersville Elementary, Walkersville
- Waverley Elementary, Frederick
- Whittier Elementary, Frederick
- Wolfsville Elementary, Myersville
- Yellow Springs Elementary, Frederick
  - Original location constructed in 1957; new relocated facility constructed in 2026

== Other schools ==
- Career & Technology Center, Frederick
- Carroll Creek Montessori Public Charter School, Frederick
- Monocacy Valley Montessori Public Charter School, Frederick
- Remote Virtual Program
- Sabillasville Environmental School (Public Charter), Sabillasville, MD

== Academic performance ==
FCPS ranks number one in the state of Maryland in the 2012 School Progress Index accountability data, which includes overall student performance, closing achievement gaps, student growth and college and career readiness. FCPS holds the second-lowest dropout rate in the state of Maryland at 3.84%, with a graduation rate at 93.31%. In 2013, FCPS's SAT average combined mean score was 1538, which is 55 points higher than Maryland's combined average of 1483 and 40 points higher than the nation's average of 1498. Academic achievement improved from 2024 to 2025 across the system, based on the Maryland School Report Card dataset. All of FCPS's high schools, except for Oakdale High School, which was not open to all grade levels at the time of the survey, are ranked in the top 10% of the nation for encouraging students to take AP classes.
