= Lewis Mill Complex =

- U.S. National Register of Historic Places
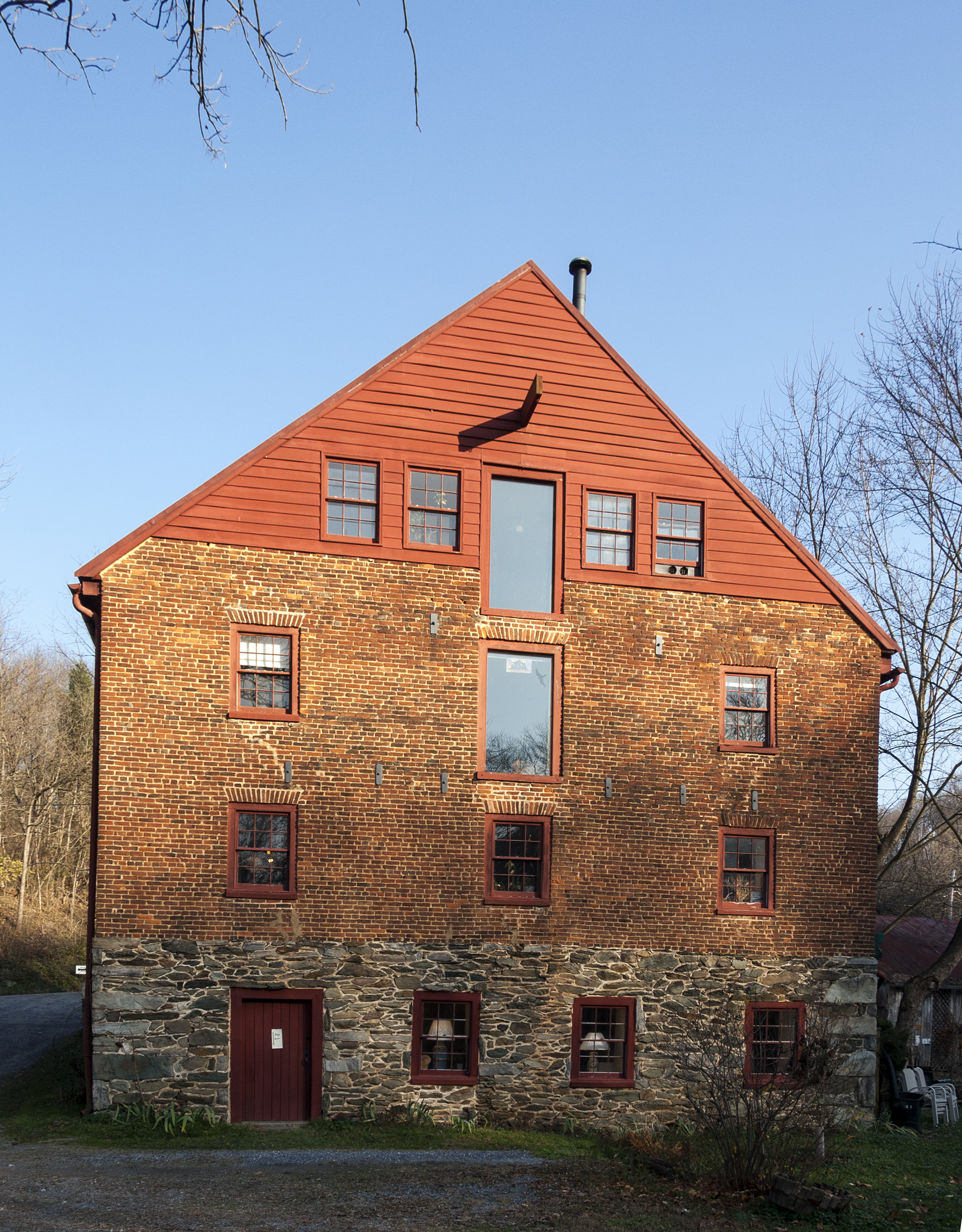

- Location within Maryland Location within the United States
- Nearest city: Jefferson, Maryland
- Coordinates: 39°22′20″N 77°33′34″W
- Area: 2.4 acres (0.97 ha)
- Built: 1810
- NRHP reference No.: 82002813
- Added to NRHP: May 6, 1982

Lewis Mill Complex is a historic grist mill complex located at Jefferson, Frederick County, Maryland. The complex consists of seven standing structures, a house foundation, and the remains of an earlier millrace. It centers on an early 19th-century three-story brick mill structure with a gabled roof. The mill complex served German immigrant farmers in Middletown Valley between 1810 and the 1920s. It was rehabilitated in 1979-1980 for use as a pottery shop. Also in the complex are a stuccoed log house and log springhouse built about; a frame wagon shed and corn crib structure and frame barn dating from the late 19th century; and early 20th century cattle shelter and a frame garage.

It was listed on the National Register of Historic Places in 1982.

A trombe wall was installed on the south wall of the mill in 1980 to heat the business and living quarters. Solar panels were installed on outbuildings in 2011.
