= John B. Funk =

American politician (1905–1993)

Secretary of State of Maryland
- In office 1947
- Preceded by: Edward G. Chaney
- Succeeded by: Bertram Lee Boone II

Member of the Maryland Senate from the Frederick County district
- In office 1939–1947
- Preceded by: Harry W. LeGore
- Succeeded by: Edward D. Storm

Member of the Maryland House of Delegates from the Frederick County district
- In office 1935–1938 Serving with A. Lamar Barrick, George E. Castle, Joseph B. Payne, Jacob R. Ramsburg, Charles S. Houck Jr.
- Preceded by: Casper E. Cline Jr., Anderson H. Etzler, D. Charles Flook, Harry W. LeGore, John D. Nicodemus
- Succeeded by: Robert E. Clapp Jr., Donald J. Gardner, Charles S. Houck Jr., Jacob R. Ramsburg, Howard B. Smith

Personal details
- Born: John Benjamin Funk; April 20, 1905 Hillsborough, Virginia, U.S.
- Died: March 16, 1993 (aged 87) Hanover, Pennsylvania, U.S.
- Resting place: Mount Olivet Cemetery; Frederick, Maryland, U.S.
- Spouse(s): Doris Dindore (m. 1927; died 1953) Evelyn Robinson (m. 1953)
- Children: 2
- Education: Washington and Lee University (BS)
- Occupation: Politician; engineer

John Benjamin Funk (April 20, 1905 – March 16, 1993) was an American politician from Maryland. He served in the Maryland House of Delegates, Maryland Senate and as the secretary of state of Maryland. He was known for his chairmanship of the Maryland State Roads Commission and oversaw the construction of the Baltimore Beltway and the opening of Interstate 95.

== Early life ==
John Benjamin Funk was born on April 20, 1905, in Hillsborough, Virginia, to Harry B. Funk. His father was a homebuilder. He graduated from Brunswick High School in Brunswick, Maryland, in 1922. He played trombone and played for the Potomac Club Orchestra. He graduated from Washington and Lee University with a Bachelor of Science degree in civil engineering. He was a member of Phi Beta Kappa.

== Career ==
After graduating, Funk worked for the American Bridge Company in Frederick. He then worked as a city engineer in Brunswick from 1929 to 1984. He was appointed as Maryland's chief engineer. From 1950 to 1958, he was chief engineer in Baltimore County.

Funk was a Democrat. He served as a member of the Maryland House of Delegates, representing Frederick County from 1935 to 1938. He then served as a member of the Maryland Senate from 1939 to 1947. He was chair of the Senate Finance Committee. He was Democratic floor leader from 1944 to 1946. In 1947, Governor William Preston Lane named Funk as secretary of state of Maryland.

Under Governor J. Millard Tawes he was appointed chairman of the Maryland State Roads Commission. From 1959 to 1966, under Tawes, he oversaw the construction of the Baltimore Beltway and the opening of Interstate 95. He retired in 1967 and then worked as an engineering consultant for several years.

Funk was a co-founder of the Brunswick History Commission.

== Personal life ==
Funk married Doris Dindore in 1927. They had three sons, John Demory, Harry Bruce and William B. His wife died in 1953. He later married Evelyn Robinson in 1953. He was Methodist. In 1957, he lived in Shetland Hills in Lutherville.

Funk died of heart disease on March 16, 1993, aged 87, at Hanover General Hospital in Hanover, Pennsylvania. He was buried in Mount Olivet Cemetery in Frederick.
