= Joseph B. Payne =

American politician (died 1968)

Member of the Maryland House of Delegates from the Frederick County district
- In office 1961–1967 Serving with Goodloe E. Byron, Charles E. Collins, William M. Houck, E. Earl Remsberg, C. Clifton Virts, Charles H. Smelser, Gary L. Utterback
- Preceded by: Charles E. Collins, William M. Houck, Charles Mathias, Charles H. Smelser, Gary L. Utterback, C. Clifton Virts
- Succeeded by: William M. Houck, E. Earl Remsberg, C. Clifton Virts
- In office 1947–1959 Serving with Melvin H. Derr, S. Fenton Harris, Charles H. Smelser, Gary L. Utterback, C. Clifton Virts, Horace M. Alexander, Richard B. Baumgardner, John A. Derr, William E. Hauver, Jacob R. Ramsburg
- Preceded by: Harold U. Frushour, Robert L. Grove, W. Jerome Offutt, Jacob R. Ramsburg, Gary L. Utterback, Richard E. Zimmerman
- Succeeded by: Charles E. Collins, William M. Houck, Charles Mathias, Charles H. Smelser, Gary L. Utterback, C. Clifton Virts
- In office 1935–1939 Serving with A. Lamar Barrick, John B. Funk, Charles S. Houck Jr., Jacob R. Ramsburg, George E. Castle
- Preceded by: Casper E. Cline Jr., Anderson H. Etzler, D. Charles Flook, Harry W. LeGore, John D. Nicodemus
- Succeeded by: Robert E. Clapp Jr., Donald J. Gardner, Charles S. Houck Jr., Jacob R. Ramsburg, Howard B. Smith

Personal details
- Born: Leesburg, Virginia, U.S.
- Died: March 5, 1968 (aged 72) Martinsburg, West Virginia, U.S.
- Resting place: Reformed Cemetery; Middletown, Maryland, U.S.
- Party: Republican
- Spouse: Mary E. Roby (m. 1919)
- Occupation: Politician; railroad worker

Joseph B. Payne (died March 5, 1968) was an American politician from Maryland. He served in the Maryland House of Delegates, representing Frederick County from 1935 to 1939, from 1947 to 1959 and from 1961 to 1967.

== Early life ==
Joseph B. Payne was born in Leesburg, Virginia. He attended Brunswick High School in Brunswick, Maryland.

== Career ==
Payne served with Company L, 313th regiment of the 79th Infantry Division and Company K, 11th regiment of the 28th Infantry Division of the United States Army from 1917 to 1924. He served during World War I and received the Purple Heart. He worked for the Baltimore and Ohio Railroad for 37 years. He retired in 1961. He was a switch operator at the Brunswick railyard.

Payne was a Republican. He was a member of the Maryland House of Delegates from 1935 to 1939 and from 1947 to 1959. In 1961, he was appointed as a state delegate to fill the vacancy left by Charles Mathias. He then served until 1967.

== Personal life ==
Payne married Mary E. Roby, daughter of James P. Roby, of Brunswick on November 20, 1919. He was a member of the First Baptist Church in Brunswick.

Payne died on March 5, 1968, aged 72, at Newton D. Baker Hospital in Martinsburg, West Virginia. He was buried in Reformed Cemetery in Middletown.
