= George Willard House =

Historic house in Maryland, United States

- U.S. National Register of Historic Places
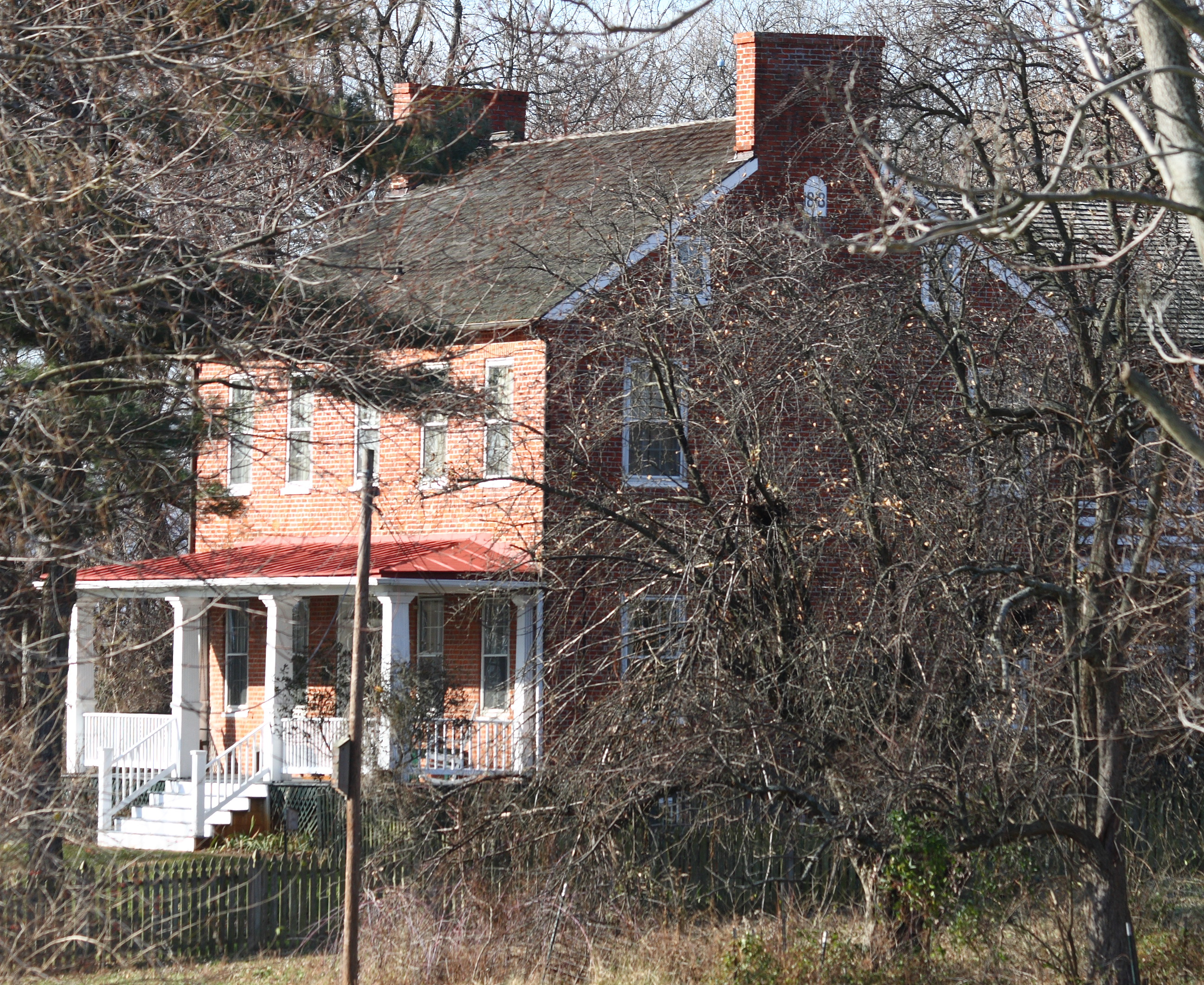

- Location within Maryland Location within the United States
- Location: 4804 Old Middletown Rd., Jefferson, Maryland
- Coordinates: 39°21′54″N 77°32′23″W
- Area: 10 acres (4.0 ha)
- Built: 1818
- Architectural style: Greek Revival, Federal
- NRHP reference No.: 93000665
- Added to NRHP: July 22, 1993

The George Willard House, also known as New Freedom Spring, is a Federal style house with Greek Revival details near Jefferson, Maryland. Built about 1818 for farmer and tanner George Willard, the house was altered by Willard's son after 1845 with Greek Revival remodeling.

The George Willard House was listed on the National Register of Historic Places in 1993.
