= Brunswick, Maryland =

City in Maryland, United States

- City
- City of Brunswick
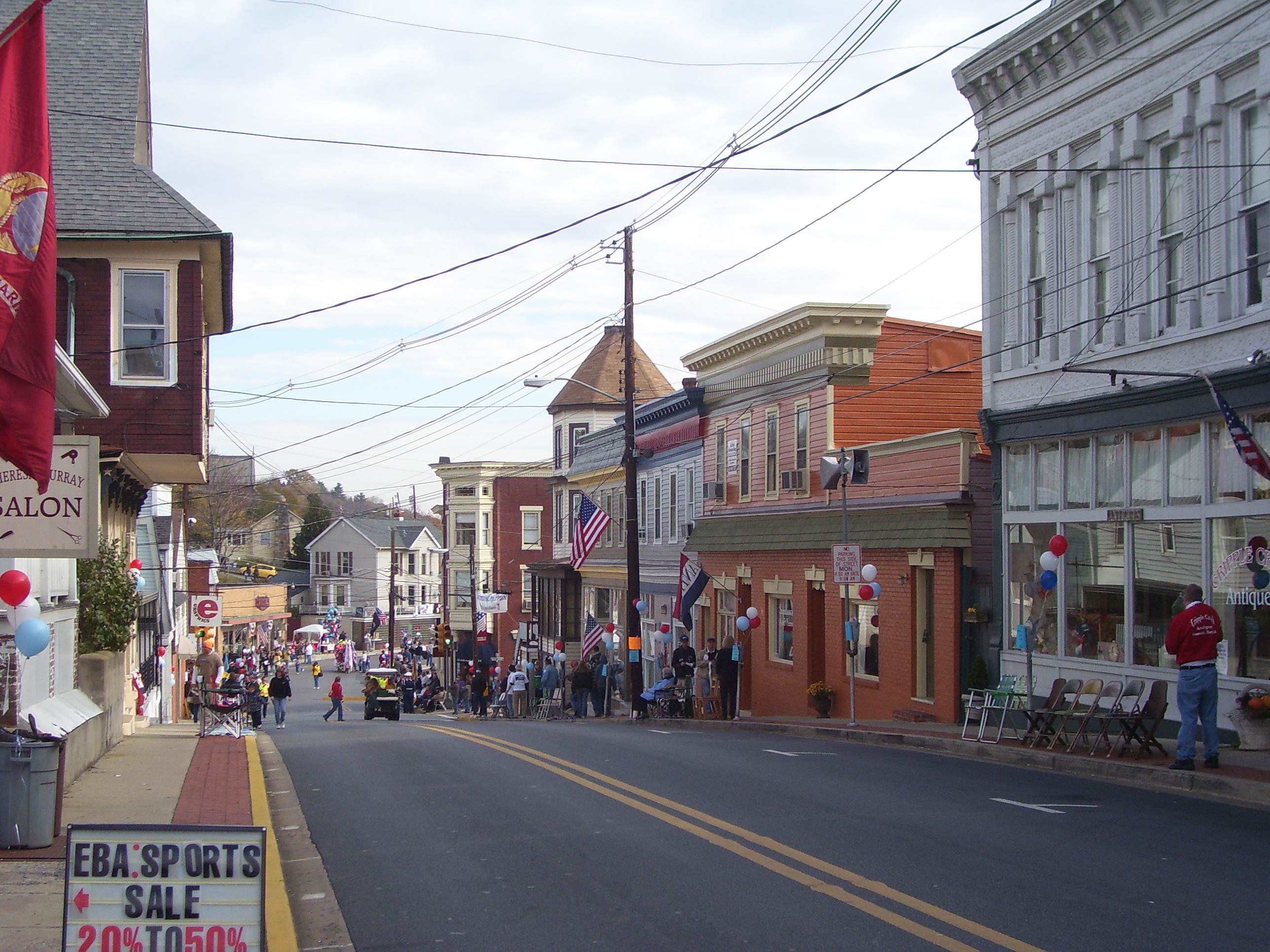
- The historic commercial district along Potomac Street in Brunswick

- Flag Seal
- Motto: Big Town. Small City.
- Location of Brunswick, Maryland
- Coordinates: 39°19′00″N 77°37′16″W
- Country: United States
- State: Maryland
- County: Frederick

Area
  - Total: 3.71 sq mi (9.61 km^{2})
  - Land: 3.27 sq mi (8.48 km^{2})
  - Water: 0.44 sq mi (1.13 km^{2})
- Elevation: 295 ft (90 m)

Population (2020)
  - Total: 7,762
- Time zone: UTC−5 (Eastern (EST))
  - Summer (DST): UTC−4 (EDT)
- ZIP code: 21716
- Area codes: 301, 240
- FIPS code: 24-10900
- GNIS feature ID: 2390569
- Website: brunswickmd.gov

Brunswick is a city in southwestern Frederick County, Maryland, United States. The city is located on the north bank of the Potomac River; Loudoun County, Virginia occupies the opposite shore. The population of Brunswick was 8,211 at the 2022 Census.

== History ==
The area now known as Brunswick was originally home to the Susquehanna Native American tribe. In 1728 the first settlement was built, and the region became known as Eel Town, because the natives would fish for eel in the Potomac River. A grant to the land was then given to John Hawkins by George II of Great Britain on August 10, 1753. The grant had the name "Hawkins Merry-Peep-o-Day".

The land was sold and Leonard Smith platted it in 1787 with the name of “Berlin,” as many Germans settled in the area. The name “Berlin,” however, could not be used for mail as there was already a Berlin on the Eastern Shore of Maryland, so the post office changed the name to "Barry." The town continued to grow and was incorporated April 18, 1890 with the name "Brunswick."

Established along the now-defunct Chesapeake and Ohio Canal, the city became a hub for the Baltimore and Ohio Railroad, which built a six-mile-long rail yard along the Potomac from 1891 to 1912, boosting the population to over 5,000, and making Brunswick virtually a company town. The railroad reduced its yard operations in the 1950s.

During Patsy Cline's early career, she performed at the Moose Lodge in Brunswick where she met her first husband, Gerald Cline.

Today Brunswick is home to a commuter rail station serving Washington, D.C. It is home of the Brunswick Heritage Museum which interprets the history of the city and is home of a large model railroad showing why the city's location was important to the railroad. Brunswick High School named their mascot the "railroaders".

== Tourism ==
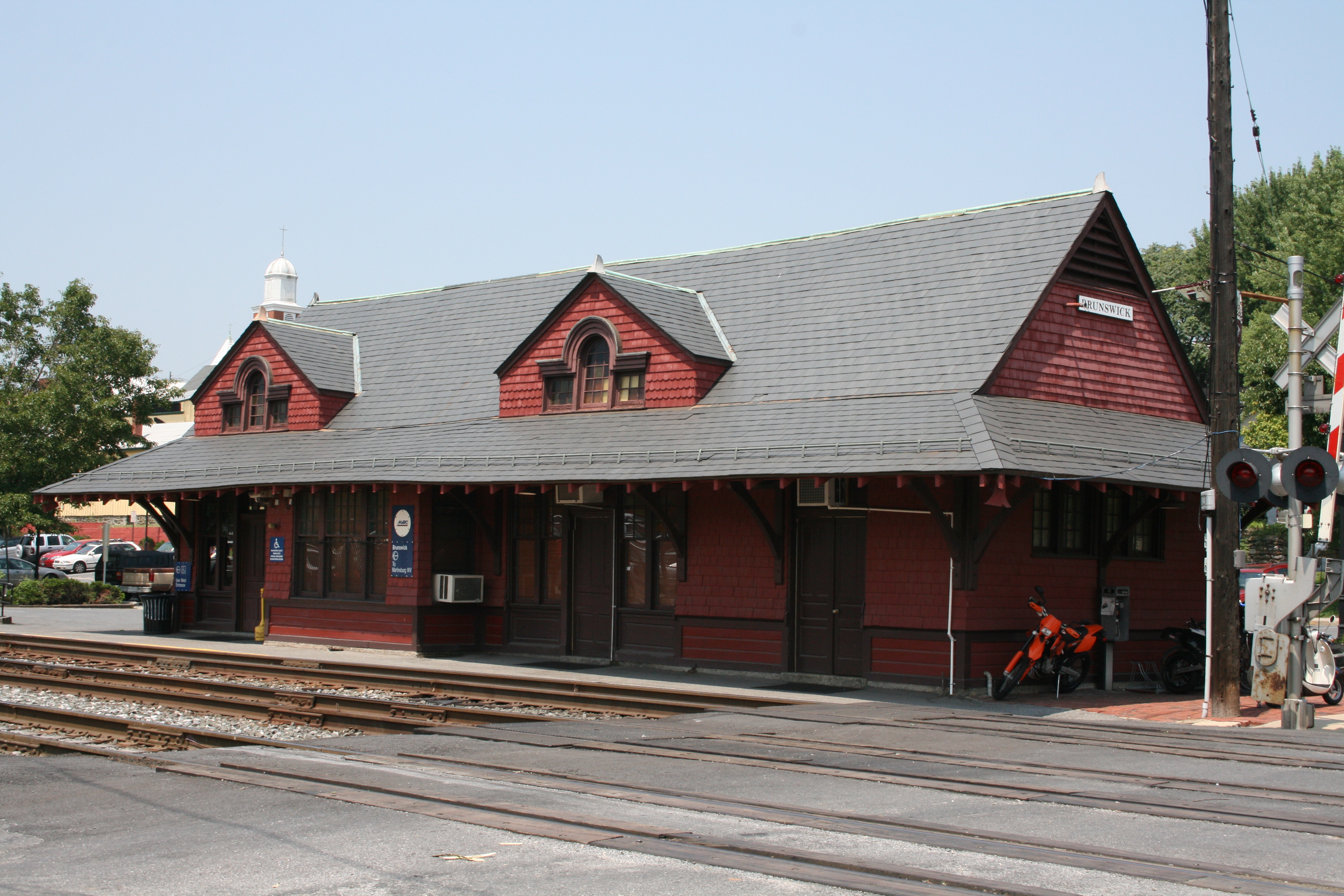
The historic Baltimore and Ohio Railroad Station (1891), one of the city's landmarks.

The largest citywide event is "Railroad Days" on the first weekend in October, a festival celebrating the city's heritage. Another major annual event is the Veterans Day Parade, which has taken place each year since 1932. Other events year round include the Wine and Chocolate Walk in September, Farmers' Market, Arts In The Parks, Little League opening day, and other city and museum events.

The city markets its historic downtown and its access to recreational activities on the C&O Canal and Potomac River. The city's history is preserved in the Brunswick Heritage Museum (formerly the Brunswick Railroad Museum), established in 1974. The historic commercial district of the city along Potomac Street features a bike shop, antique stores, restaurants, a brewpub, a yoga studio, a martial arts studio, a convenience store, and a sporting goods store.

== Notable people ==
- Galen R. Clagett – Maryland politician
- Jake Ewald - musician and co-founder of Modern Baseball and Slaughter Beach, Dog
- John B. Funk (1905–1993), Maryland delegate and state senator, secretary of state of Maryland
- Michael Hough – Maryland state senator
- Brendan Lukens – musician and co-founder of Modern Baseball
- Joseph B. Payne (died 1968), member of the Maryland House of Delegates

== Geography ==
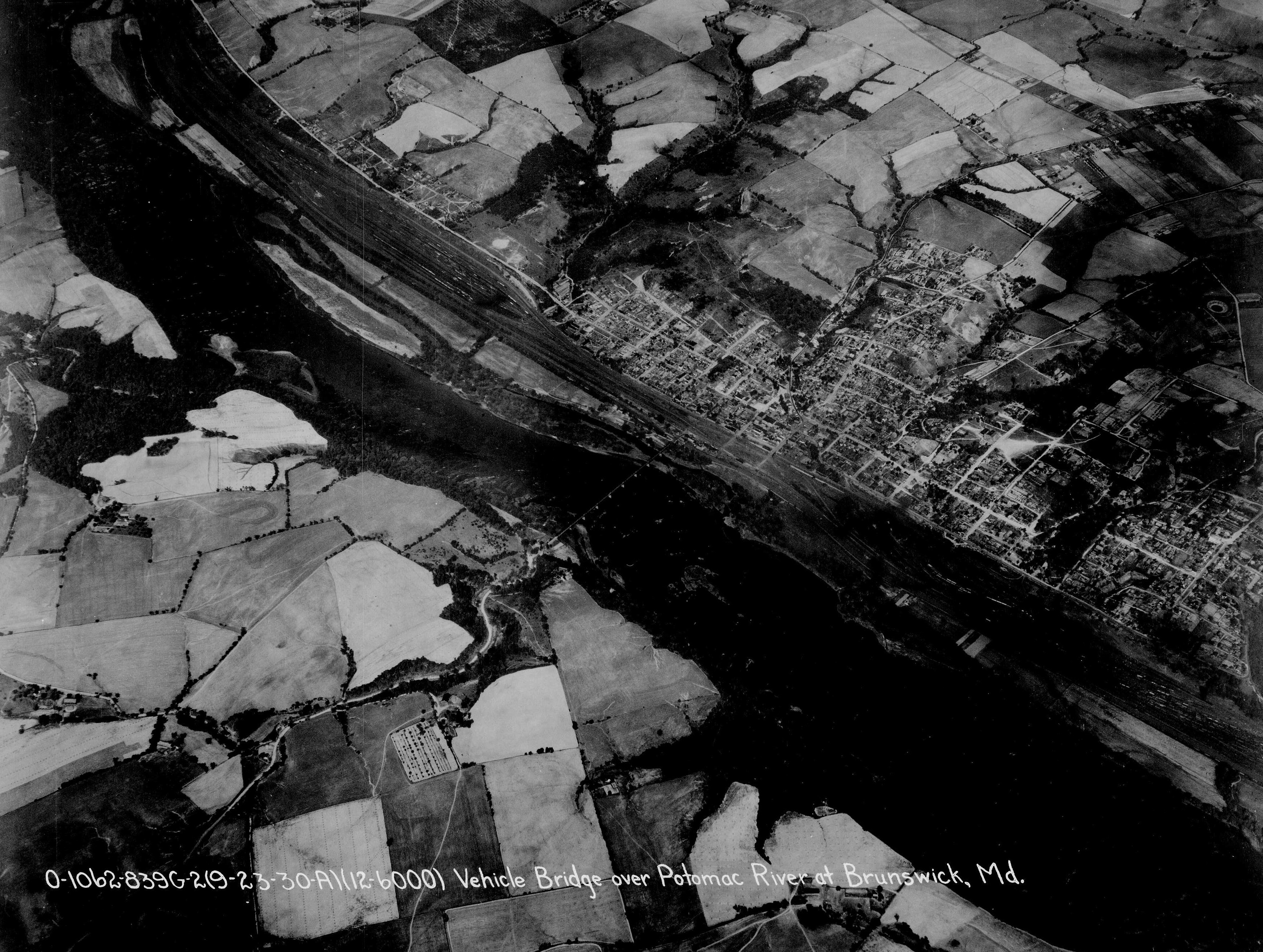
Aerial view of Brunswick, 1930

According to the United States Census Bureau, the city has a total area of 3.71 square miles (9.61 km^{2}), of which 3.27 square miles (8.47 km^{2}) is land and 0.44 square miles (1.14 km^{2}) is water.

== Business ==
Because of the population of Brunswick increasing, many businesses are being built. Located in Brunswick are many small businesses and retail chain stores with a Holiday Inn Express just built.

== Transportation ==
=== Roadways ===
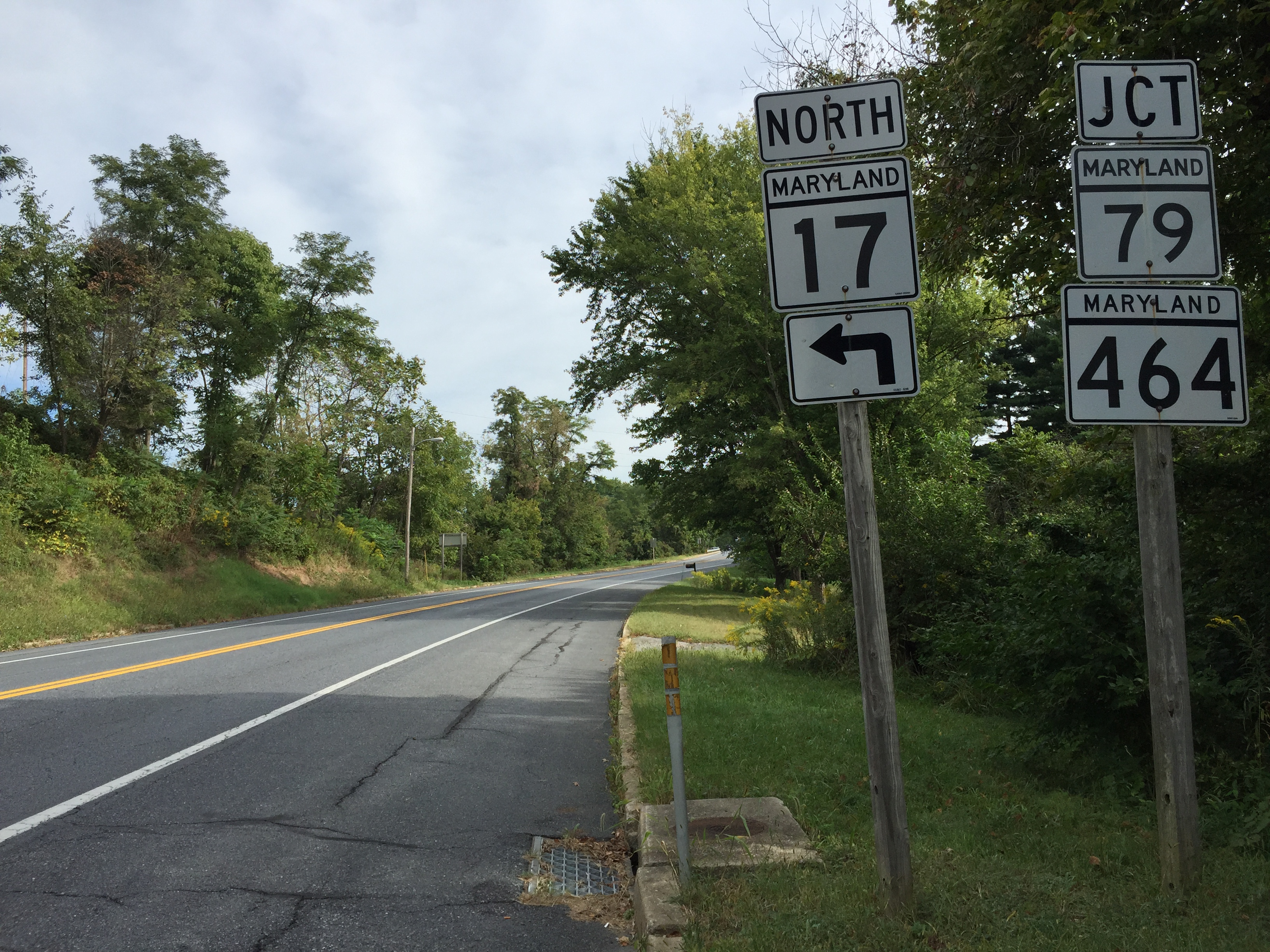
Northbound MD 17 approaching its junction with MD 464 and MD 79

The primary method of travel to and from Brunswick is by road. Several state highways serve the city, with the most prominent of these being Maryland Route 17. MD 17 heads south across the Potomac River into Virginia, where it becomes Virginia State Route 287. Just north of Brunswick, MD 17 has junctions with Maryland Route 464, Maryland Route 79, Maryland Route 180, Maryland Route 871 and U.S. Route 340, which provides access to numerous locations across Frederick County. Aside from MD 17, portions of MD 180, MD 464 and Maryland Route 478 also traverse the city.

=== Public transportation ===
MARC operates commuter trains on weekdays between Brunswick and Union Station in Washington, D.C. Some trains and shuttle busses operated by the Eastern Panhandle Transit Authority (EPTA), run past Brunswick to West Virginia.

TransIT's Brunswick / Jefferson shuttle serves Brunswick.

== Demographics ==
Historical population
Census	Pop.	Note	%±
1900	2,471		—
1910	3,721		50.6%
1920	3,905		4.9%
1930	3,671		−6.0%
1940	3,856		5.0%
1950	3,752		−2.7%
1960	3,555		−5.3%
1970	3,566		0.3%
1980	4,572		28.2%
1990	5,117		11.9%
2000	4,894		−4.4%
2010	5,870		19.9%
2020	7,762		32.2%
Decennial US Census

=== 2020 census ===
As of the 2020 census, Brunswick had a population of 7,762. The median age was 37.1 years. 26.6% of residents were under the age of 18 and 12.4% of residents were 65 years of age or older. For every 100 females, there were 93.5 males, and for every 100 females age 18 and over, there were 94.3 males age 18 and over.

96.6% of residents lived in urban areas, while 3.4% lived in rural areas.

There were 2,796 households in Brunswick, of which 39.3% had children under the age of 18 living in them. Of all households, 54.2% were married-couple households, 15.9% were households with a male householder and no spouse or partner present, and 22.5% were households with a female householder and no spouse or partner present. About 21.0% of all households were made up of individuals and 7.7% had someone living alone who was 65 years of age or older.

There were 3,030 housing units, of which 7.7% were vacant. The homeowner vacancy rate was 2.6% and the rental vacancy rate was 5.4%.

Racial composition as of the 2020 census
Race	Number	Percent
White	5,955	76.7%
Black or African American	696	9.0%
American Indian and Alaska Native	12	0.2%
Asian	173	2.2%
Native Hawaiian and Other Pacific Islander	0	0.0%
Some other race	230	3.0%
Two or more races	696	9.0%
Hispanic or Latino (of any race)	644	8.3%

=== 2010 census ===
As of the 2010 census of 2010, there were 5,870 people, 2,155 households, and 1,515 families living in the city. The population density was 1,795.1 inhabitants per square mile (693.1/km^{2}). There were 2,330 housing units at an average density of 712.5 units per square mile (275.1 units/km^{2}). The racial makeup was 86.3% White, 7.5% African American, 0.2% Native American, 1.7% Asian, 1.2% from other races, and 3.2% from two or more races. Hispanic or Latino of any race were 4.9% of the population.

There were 2,155 households, of which 38.5% had children under the age of 18 living with them, 51.6% were married couples living together, 13.7% had a female householder with no husband present, 5.0% had a male householder with no wife present, and 29.7% were non-families. 23.2% of all households were made up of individuals, and 8.8% had someone living alone who was 65 years of age or older. The average household size was 2.72 and the average family size was 3.22.

The median age in the city was 36.9 years. 27.1% of residents were under the age of 18; 7.9% were between the ages of 18 and 24; 28% were from 25 to 44; 27.3% were from 45 to 64; and 9.8% were 65 years of age or older. The gender makeup was 49.1% male and 50.9% female.

=== 2000 census ===
As of the census of 2000, there were 4,894 people, 1,866 households, and 1,306 families living in the city. The population density was 2,324.3 inhabitants per square mile (897.4/km^{2}). There were 1,957 housing units at an average density of 929.4 units per square mile (358.8 units/km^{2}). The racial makeup of the city was 92.09% White, 5.31% African American, 0.25% Native American, 0.45% Asian, 0.04% Pacific Islander, 0.18% from other races, and 1.68% from two or more races. Hispanic or Latino of any race were 0.96% of the population.

There were 1,866 households, out of which 36.3% had children under the age of 18 living with them, 50.4% were married couples living together, 14.4% had a female householder with no husband present, and 30.0% were non-families. 23.7% of all households were made up of individuals, and 10.6% had someone living alone who was 65 years of age or older. The average household size was 2.62 and the average family size was 3.11.

In the city, the population was spread out, with 27.3% under the age of 18, 8.4% from 18 to 24, 33.1% from 25 to 44, 20.2% from 45 to 64, and 11.0% who were 65 years of age or older. The median age was 35 years. For every 100 females, there were 93.2 males. For every 100 females age 18 and over, there were 89.5 males.

The median income for a household in the city was $46,513, and the median income for a family was $53,232. Males had a median income of $36,304 versus $25,017 for females. The per capita income was $20,685. About 2.5% of families and 3.7% of the population were below the poverty line, including 4.8% of those under age 18 and 3.5% of those age 65 or over.

== Climate data ==
Climate data for Brunswick, Maryland
Month	Jan	Feb	Mar	Apr	May	Jun	Jul	Aug	Sep	Oct	Nov	Dec	Year
Record high °F (°C)	78 (26)	81 (27)	89 (32)	94 (34)	98 (37)	107 (42)	109 (43)	108 (42)	108 (42)	98 (37)	86 (30)	79 (26)	109 (43)
Mean daily maximum °F (°C)	41 (5)	45 (7)	53 (12)	64 (18)	73 (23)	82 (28)	87 (31)	86 (30)	78 (26)	67 (19)	56 (13)	45 (7)	65 (18)
Mean daily minimum °F (°C)	21 (−6)	23 (−5)	30 (−1)	40 (4)	49 (9)	59 (15)	63 (17)	62 (17)	54 (12)	42 (6)	33 (1)	25 (−4)	42 (5)
Record low °F (°C)	−11 (−24)	−8 (−22)	7 (−14)	20 (−7)	29 (−2)	39 (4)	46 (8)	41 (5)	32 (0)	21 (−6)	8 (−13)	−5 (−21)	−11 (−24)
Average precipitation inches (mm)	3.29 (84)	2.47 (63)	3.64 (92)	3.48 (88)	4.45 (113)	4.21 (107)	3.68 (93)	3.82 (97)	4.16 (106)	3.38 (86)	3.52 (89)	3.11 (79)	43.21 (1,097)
Source: The Weather Channel

== Education ==
It is in Frederick County Public Schools.

School zoning is as follows: Most residents are zoned to Brunswick Elementary while some in the city limits are zoned to Valley Elementary School. All residents are zoned to Brunswick Middle School and Brunswick High School.
