= Jefferson, Maryland =

- Census-designated place
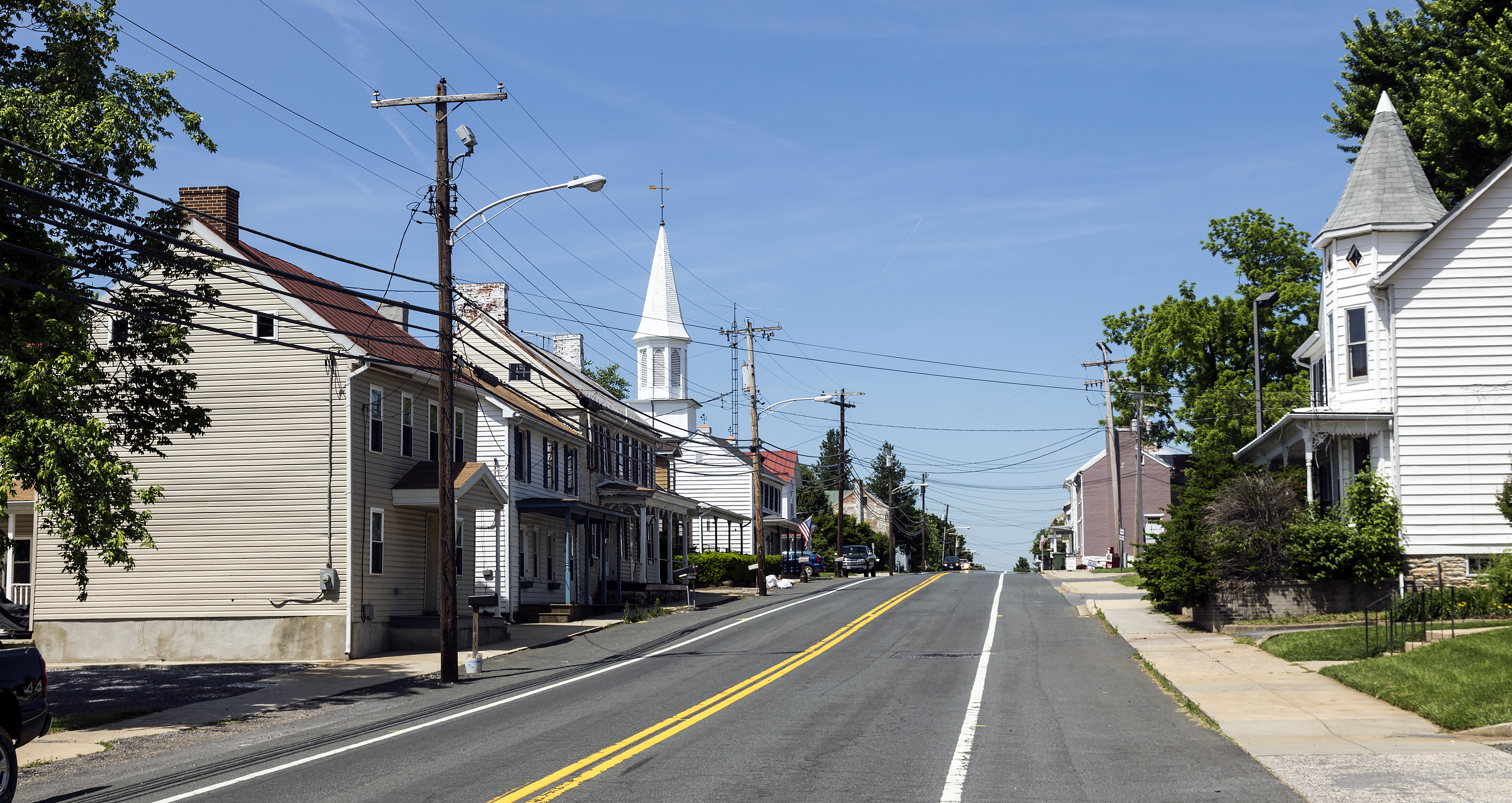
- The center of Jefferson

- Location in Maryland Jefferson (the United States)
- Coordinates: 39°22′17″N 77°32′20″W
- Country: United States
- State: Maryland
- County: Frederick

Area
  - Total: 2.79 sq mi (7.22 km^{2})
  - Land: 2.79 sq mi (7.22 km^{2})
  - Water: 0 sq mi (0.00 km^{2})
- Elevation: 538 ft (164 m)

Population (2020)
  - Total: 2,697
  - Density: 968.0/sq mi (373.76/km^{2})
- Time zone: UTC−5 (Eastern (EST))
  - Summer (DST): UTC−4 (EDT)
- ZIP code: 21755
- Area codes: 301, 240
- FIPS code: 24-42350
- GNIS feature ID: 2583640

Jefferson is an unincorporated community and census-designated place (CDP) in Frederick County, Maryland, United States. As of the 2020 census the town had a population of 2,235 (which includes the widespread area of the town's zip code, not Jefferson proper). Jefferson was established in 1774 and incorporated as a town in 1831. However, a year later, in 1832, the citizens of the town decided that municipal government was unnecessary, and dis-incorporated the town, which has been unincorporated since then.

== History ==
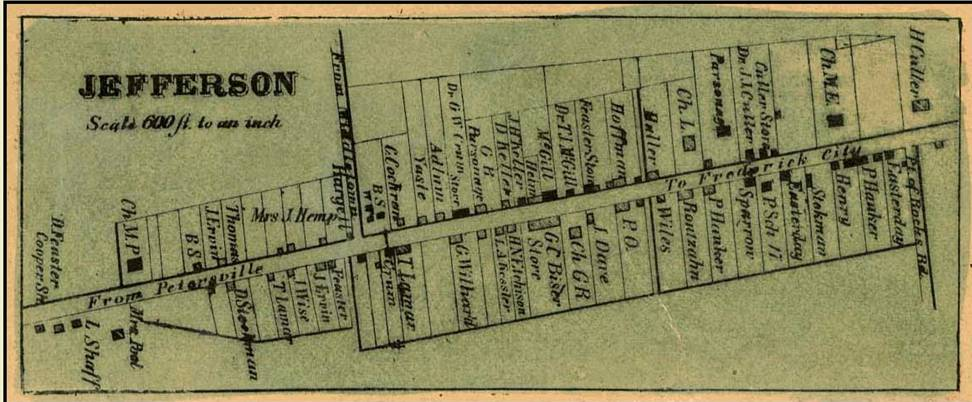
An 1858 Frederick County detail map of Jefferson from Isaac Bond

According to archaeologist Mary F. Barse, Jefferson was initially laid out in 1774 on a 96-acre (390,000 m^{2}) tract owned by Mrs. Eleanor Medley, which was ultimately called "New Town". It contained 40 rectangular lots – 20 aligned on each side of what is now MD 180 – stretching between what are now Lander Road and Old Middletown Road. In 1795, 22 additional lots were platted by Elias Delashmutt on the western end of the original section, and called "New Freedom". In 1831 both sections were incorporated as "Jefferson" by the Maryland Legislature.

Jefferson's growth in the 19th century was due largely to its location on the main road between Frederick and Harpers Ferry, which is today's Maryland Route 180. Along this thoroughfare, wagon traffic and livestock drives were frequent. Concomitantly, commercial development intensified to serve the surrounding farms as well as travelers. As a center of agricultural mercantilism, throughout most of the late 18th and 19th century, Jefferson was also home to a sizable population of slaves.

The Hagerstown and Frederick Railway linked Jefferson to Frederick and Hagerstown in 1907, however, Jefferson Pike remained the only link to the nearby steam powered rail station in Brunswick.

Examined historic maps (Griffith 1795; Bond 1858; Martenet 1865, 1885; Lake 1873; USGS1910) depict Jefferson on what is now MD 180 as early as 1795. It was designated "Trap Town" at the close of the 18th century by Griffith (1795). Local history suggests that the name derives from the large number of taverns operating at the time, which were purportedly, on either ends of town. Consequently, a traveler could be "trapped" on their way in or out of town.

== Geography and transportation ==
Jefferson is located in southwestern Frederick County at the western base of Catoctin Mountain. Maryland Route 180 passes through the town, and U.S. Route 340 bypasses it to the south, forming the southern edge of the CDP. US 340 leads northeast 9 miles (14 km) to Frederick, the county seat, and southwest 13 miles (21 km) to Harpers Ferry, West Virginia.

Transit (Frederick County) operates the Brunswick / Jefferson shuttle to the town. This serves Jefferson's park and ride lot on Lander Road near Route 340.

According to the U.S. Census Bureau, the Jefferson CDP has an area of 2.1 square miles (5.4 km^{2}), all land.

== Demographics ==
Historical population
Census	Pop.	Note	%±
2020	2,697		—
U.S. Decennial Census

=== 2020 census ===
As of the 2020 census, Jefferson had a population of 2,697. The median age was 44.8 years. 19.5% of residents were under the age of 18 and 15.8% of residents were 65 years of age or older. For every 100 females there were 96.9 males, and for every 100 females age 18 and over there were 92.5 males age 18 and over.

0.0% of residents lived in urban areas, while 100.0% lived in rural areas.

There were 1,013 households in Jefferson, of which 28.4% had children under the age of 18 living in them. Of all households, 64.6% were married-couple households, 11.7% were households with a male householder and no spouse or partner present, and 19.6% were households with a female householder and no spouse or partner present. About 19.4% of all households were made up of individuals and 8.7% had someone living alone who was 65 years of age or older.

There were 1,048 housing units, of which 3.3% were vacant. The homeowner vacancy rate was 1.6% and the rental vacancy rate was 3.0%.

Racial composition as of the 2020 census
Race	Number	Percent
White	2,313	85.8%
Black or African American	89	3.3%
American Indian and Alaska Native	6	0.2%
Asian	56	2.1%
Native Hawaiian and Other Pacific Islander	1	0.0%
Some other race	45	1.7%
Two or more races	187	6.9%
Hispanic or Latino (of any race)	150	5.6%

== Arts and culture ==
The Lewis Mill Complex and the George Willard House are National Register of Historic Places properties near Jefferson.

== Education ==
It is in Frederick County Public Schools.

School zoning is as follows: The vast majority of the CDP is zoned to Valley Elementary School, Brunswick Middle School, and Brunswick High School. A northeast portion of the CDP is zoned to Middletown Primary School, Middletown Elementary School, Middletown Middle School, and Middletown High School.

== Notable people ==
- Debbie Ricker (born 1965), reproductive biologist and academic administrator
