= John D. Nicodemus =

American politician (1864–1934)

Member of the Maryland House of Delegates from the Frederick County district
- In office 1931–1933 Serving with Casper E. Cline Jr., Anderson H. Etzler, D. Charles Flook, Harry W. LeGore
- Preceded by: Anderson H. Etzler, D. Charles Flook, U. Grant Hooper, Lewis F. Kefauver, Grayson E. Palmer
- Succeeded by: A. Lamar Barrick, George E. Castle, John B. Funk, Joseph B. Payne, Jacob R. Ramsburg

Personal details
- Born: July 25, 1864 near Walkersville, Maryland, U.S.
- Died: April 10, 1934 (aged 69) Walkersville, Maryland, U.S.
- Resting place: Mount Olivet Cemetery; Frederick, Maryland, U.S.
- Party: Prohibition Party; Democratic
- Spouse: Rebecca Nelson (m. 1879; died 1927)
- Children: 7
- Education: Dickinson Seminary; Jefferson Medical College
- Occupation: Politician; physician

John D. Nicodemus (July 25, 1864 – April 10, 1934) was an American politician and physician from Maryland. He served in the Maryland House of Delegates, representing Frederick County from 1931 to 1933.

== Early life ==
John D. Nicodemus was born on July 25, 1864, on a farm near Walkersville, Maryland, to Nancy (née Cassell) and John Lewis Nicodemus. His father was a farmer. Nicodemus attended public schools and worked on his father's farm. He graduated from Dickinson Seminary in 1874. He graduated from Jefferson Medical College in 1879.

== Career ==
Nicodemus returned home to practice medicine. He practiced for about 25 years. He was a staff member of Frederick City Hospital and was a member of the Frederick County Medical Society.

Nicodemus was in favor of prohibition and was the Prohibition Party candidate for Maryland Comptroller. He later associated with the Democratic party and supported lowering tariffs. He served as a member of the Maryland House of Delegates, representing Frederick County, from 1931 to 1933. He was a member of the Frederick County School Board. He was known for writing letters to the press espousing his beliefs, including his support for prohibition and easing rural taxes. William J. Grove was one of the opponents to his writings.

Nicodemus was an organizer of the Walkersville Water Company in 1909 and served as its president at the time of his death. He was president of the Glade Valley Mining Company in Walkersville and the Mt. Airy Milling Company in Mt. Airy.

== Personal life ==
Nicodemus married Rebecca Nelson, daughter of Ellen and Robert W. Nelson, of Frederick County in 1879. They had seven children, John V., Kent C., Robert N., Nellie, Edith, Mary and Elizabeth. His wife died in 1927. He was a member of the Walkersville Methodist Episcopal Church for 70 years. He was a member of its board of trustees and was a Sunday school teacher.

Nicodemus died at his home in Walkersville on April 10, 1938. He was buried in Mount Olivet Cemetery in Frederick.
