= Urbana High School (Maryland) =

Location
- 3471 Campus Drive; Ijamsville, Maryland 21754; United States; 39°19′35″N 77°20′23″W

Information
- School type: Public Secondary
- Motto: "One team; One Urbana"
- Founded: 1995
- School district: Frederick County Public Schools
- Teaching staff: 88.5 (on an FTE basis)
- Grades: 9-12
- Enrollment: 1,989 (2024-25)
- Student to teacher ratio: 19.86
- Colors: Navy, grey, and white
- Mascot: Hawks
- Nickname: Hawks
- Accreditation: Blue Ribbon
- Feeder schools: Urbana Middle School; Windsor Knolls Middle School
- Website: uhs.sites.fcps.org
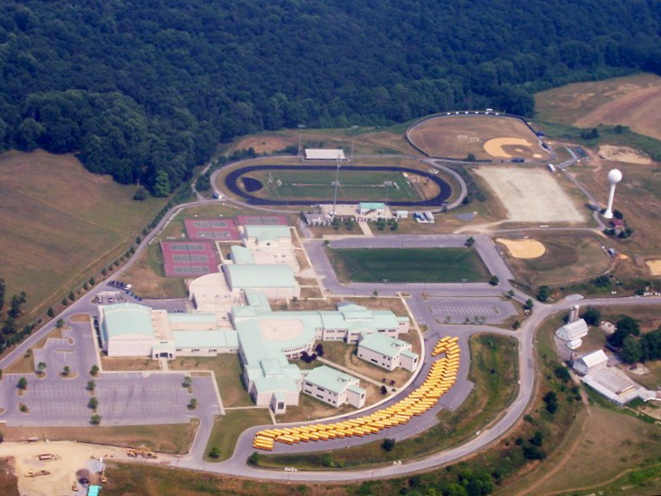

Urbana High School is a secondary public school in Ijamsville, Maryland, United States. It serves grades 9-12 and is a part of the Frederick County Public Schools.

The school's attendance boundary includes the following: Urbana, and a portion of Green Valley.

== History ==
Urbana High School was founded in 1995 and has grown rapidly.

== Demographics ==
The demographic breakdown of the 1,907 students enrolled in 2020-2021 was:

- Male - 50.3%
- Female - 49.7%
- Native American/Alaskan Native - 0.3%
- Asian - 16.8%
- Black/African American - 9.1%
- Hispanic/Latino - 11%
- White - 63%
- Multiracial - <1%

9.8% of the students were eligible for free or reduced lunch.

== Academics ==
In 2021, Urbana High School was ranked 8th in Maryland and 375th nationally by U.S. News & World Report. The school has an Honors Program, an Advanced Placement Program, as well as an International Baccalaureate Diploma Program. In both 2018 and 2019, Urbana was recognized as a Maryland Blue Ribbon School and as a National Blue Ribbon School respectively for consistently high student achievement. The school also boasts some of the best athletics in the entire state.

== Athletics ==
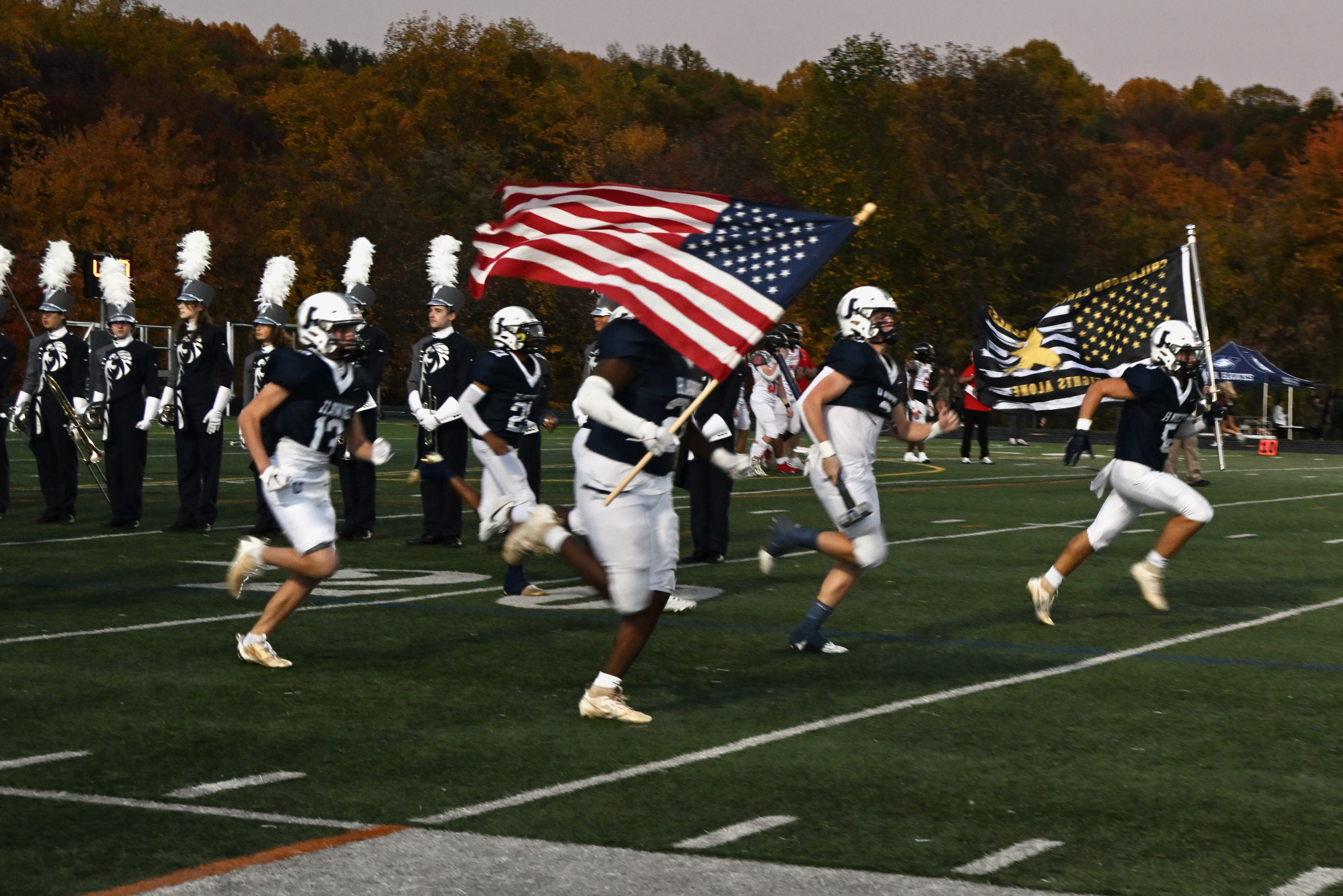
The Urbana Hawks varsity football team in 2023

Fall Season
Boys: Cross Country, Football, Golf, Soccer, Unified Tennis
Girls: Cheerleading, Cross Country, Field Hockey, Soccer, Volleyball, Unified Tennis

Winter Season
Boys: Basketball, Ice Hockey, Indoor Track & Field, Swimming & Diving, Wrestling, Unified Bocce
Girls: Basketball, Cheerleading, Indoor Track & Field, Swimming & Diving, Unified Bocce

Spring Season
Boys: Baseball, Lacrosse, Tennis, Outdoor Track & Field, Unified Track
Girls: Lacrosse, Softball, Tennis, Outdoor Track & Field, Unified Track

== Notable alumni ==
- Samantha Heyison, Paralympic athlete at 2024 Summer Paralympics
- Jessie Graff, professional stunt woman and American Ninja Warrior
- Noah Grove, sled hockey Paralympic champion in the 2022 Winter Paralympics
- Trey Lipscomb, MLB third baseman for the Washington Nationals
- Vivienne "VivziePop" Medrano, creator of the television series Hazbin Hotel and Helluva Boss
- Matthew Semelsberger, UFC MMA fighter
