= List of former Maryland state highways (2–199) =

Highway names
- Interstates: Interstate X (I-X)
- US Highways: U.S. Route X (US X)
- State: Maryland Route X (MD X)
- Former state highways: 2–199; 200–399; 400–499; 500–599; 600–699; 700–999

System links
- Maryland highway system; Interstate; US; State; Scenic Byways

The Maryland highway system has several hundred former state highways. These highways were constructed, maintained, or funded by the Maryland State Roads Commission or Maryland State Highway Administration and assigned a unique or temporally unique number. Some time after the highway was assigned, the highway was transferred to county or municipal maintenance and the number designation was removed from the particular stretch of road. In some cases, a highway was renumbered in whole or in part. This list contains all or most of the state-numbered highways between 2 and 199 that have existed since highways were first numbered in 1927 but are no longer part of the state highway system or are state highways of a different number. Most former state highways have not had their numbers reused. However, many state highway numbers were used for a former highway and are currently in use. Some numbers have been used three times. The former highways below whose numbers are used presently, those that were taken over in whole or in part by another highway, or have enough information to warrant a separate article contain links to those separate highway articles. Highway numbers that have two or more former uses are differentiated below by year ranges. This list does not include former Interstate or U.S. Highways, which are linked from their respective lists.

== MD 17 (1927–1940) ==
Maryland Route 17
- Location: Claiborne–Easton
- Existed: 1927–1940

Maryland Route 17 was the designation for most of what is now MD 33 between Claiborne and Easton in western Talbot County. The state highway was one of the original state-numbered highways marked in 1927. MD 17 was replaced with MD 33 when the two highways swapped numbers in 1940.

== MD 20 (1927–1998) ==
Maryland Route 20
- Location: Fort Howard–Baltimore
- Existed: 1927–1998

Maryland Route 20 was the designation for North Point Road, which originally ran from the tracks of an interurban near Fort Howard north through Edgemere and Dundalk in southeastern Baltimore County to US 40 in Baltimore. MD 20 was the main highway between Baltimore and Sparrows Point, which was accessed by MD 151 (Sparrows Point Road) from Edgemere. The interurban line connected Baltimore with Bay Shore Park, an amusement park that operated between 1906 and 1947 within what is now North Point State Park. As early as 1923 and late as 1928, a ferry connected Bay Shore Park with Rock Hall, thus briefly and indirectly connecting this MD 20 with the extant MD 20 in Kent County.

The first section of MD 20 was constructed as a concrete road from Sparrows Point Road in Edgemere to Trappe Road at the hamlet of North Point in what is now Dundalk by 1921. The concrete road was extended from North Point to Baltimore in 1922 and 1923; those same years, a macadam road was built from Sparrows Point Road to the interurban tracks near Bay Shore Park. MD 20 was widened and resurfaced with bituminous concrete north of Edgemere by 1926. By 1934, MD 20 was proposed to be expanded from a width of 18 to 20 feet (5.5 to 6.1 m) to 40 feet (12 m) from Baltimore to MD 151 in Edgemere to serve the Sparrows Point industrial complex. In addition, MD 20 from MD 151 to the interurban near Bay Shore Park was proposed to be widened from 14 feet (4.3 m) to 20 feet (6.1 m). The Edgemere portion of MD 20 was bypassed when a new four-lane divided highway—Sparrows Point Boulevard and North Point Boulevard—was completed from Sparrows Point to Wise Avenue in Dundalk in 1940 and 1941. Between 1942 and 1944, the remainder of North Point Boulevard was constructed from Wise Avenue to Baltimore as a wartime access project, including a cloverleaf interchange at MD 150. In addition, Erdman Avenue was extended as a four-lane divided highway to connect with North Point Boulevard, bypassing the segment of North Point Road between the boulevard and US 40 in the city of Baltimore.

By 1946, MD 151 was applied to the four-lane divided highway connecting Baltimore with Sparrows Point, and MD 20 was assigned to four mainline segments and a spur of the old North Point Road:

- MD 20A was the designation for the 0.51-mile-long (0.82 km) section of North Point Road from the ramp from southbound MD 151 to westbound MD 150 northwest to a dead end at the Canton Railroad near the Baltimore city limit.
- MD 20B was the designation for the 2.72-mile-long (4.38 km) section of North Point Road from MD 151 and Cove Road in Dundalk northwest to a right-in/right-out interchange with eastbound MD 150 at the MD 150–MD 151 cloverleaf.
- MD 20C was the designation for the 1.30-mile-long (2.09 km) section of North Point Road from MD 151 near Wise Avenue north to MD 151 near Cove Road in Dundalk.
- MD 20D was the designation for the 2.53-mile-long (4.07 km) section of North Point Road from the former interurban track intersection at Penwood Avenue near Fort Howard north to MD 151 north of Edgemere. The portion of MD 20 from near Fort Howard to Sparrows Point Road in Edgemere was resurfaced with bituminous concrete in 1969.
- MD 20E was an unnamed 0.04-mile-long (0.064 km) spur from MD 20C to a dead end near MD 20C's northern end near Cove Road.

The 1.77-mile-long (2.85 km) portion of MD 20D from near Fort Howard to Sparrows Point Road in Edgemere, then MD 718, was transferred from state to county maintenance through a December 12, 1985, road transfer agreement. The remainder of MD 20D and all of MD 20A, MD 20B, MD 20C, and MD 20E were transferred to Baltimore County control through an October 1, 1998, road transfer agreement.

One segment of MD 20 was constructed later and was not part of North Point Road. MD 20F was an unnamed 0.52-mile-long (0.84 km) connector from southbound MD 151 to MD 20D. The highway began as a loop ramp from southbound MD 151, crossed east over both directions of MD 151, and ended at MD 20D. What became MD 20F was constructed as one of several ramps built to connect MD 151 and MD 20 with the new Bethlehem Boulevard in 1957 and 1958. However, the road did not receive the MD 20F designation until 1976. MD 20F was replaced by an eastward extension of newly designated MD 158 (Bethlehem Boulevard) when Bethlehem Boulevard was transferred from Bethlehem Steel control to state maintenance through an October 17, 1989, road transfer agreement. Former MD 20F was destroyed by the reconstruction of I-695 and its junction with MD 151 and MD 158 completed in 1999.

== MD 27 (1927–1934) ==
Maryland Route 27
- Location: Silver Spring–Ellicott City
- Existed: 1927–1934

Maryland Route 27 was the designation for what became the original alignment of US 29 in Montgomery and Howard counties when the U.S. Highway was extended into Maryland in 1934. MD 27 roughly followed modern US 29 from the District of Columbia to White Oak, MD 650 from White Oak to Ashton, MD 108 from Ashton to the original village of Columbia, US 29 again and then Old Columbia Pike into Ellicott City. After US 29 was extended into Maryland, MD 27 was placed on most of its modern course from Germantown to Westminster, which had previously been MD 29.

== MD 29 ==
Maryland Route 29
- Location: Germantown–Westminster
- Existed: 1927–1934

Maryland Route 29 was the original designation for modern MD 27 from US 240 (now MD 355) in Germantown north to US 140 (now Main Street) in Westminster in Montgomery County, Howard, Frederick, and Carroll counties. MD 29 was redesignated MD 27 after US 29 entered Maryland in 1934, replacing the original MD 27 from Silver Spring to Ellicott City.

== MD 33 (1927–1940) ==
Maryland Route 33
- Location: Brunswick–Wolfsville
- Existed: 1927–1940

Maryland Route 33 was the designation for what is now MD 17 between Brunswick and Wolfsville in western Frederick County. The state highway was one of the original state-numbered highways marked in 1927. MD 33 was replaced with MD 17 when the two highways swapped numbers in 1940.

== MD 37 (1927–1935) ==
Maryland Route 37
- Location: Redhouse–Keyser's Ridge
- Existed: 1927–1935

Maryland Route 37 was the designation for what is now US 219 from the West Virginia state line near Redhouse north through Oakland to US 40 (now US 40 Alternate) at Keyser's Ridge in Garrett County. The state highway was one of the original state-numbered highways marked in 1927. MD 37 was replaced with a southern extension of US 219, which formerly ended at US 40 east of Grantsville, in 1935.

== MD 37 (1963–1998) ==
Maryland Route 37
- Location: Garrison
- Existed: 1963–1998

Maryland Route 37 was the designation for a short stretch of McDonogh Road around its overpasses of Gwynns Falls, CSX's Hanover Subdivision, I-795, and the Baltimore Metro Subway near Garrison in western Baltimore County. The Maryland State Roads Commission relocated the road and built new bridges over Gwynns Falls and what was then the Western Maryland Railway between 1940 and 1942. The road was brought into the state highway system and designated MD 37 in 1963 and removed from the state highway system in 1998.

== MD 41 (1927–1956) ==
Maryland Route 41
- Location: Oakland – Deer Park
- Existed: 1927–1956

Maryland Route 41 was the designation for the highway between US 219 in Oakland and MD 38 in Deer Park in southern Garrett County. The first segment of the highway was completed from Oakland to Mountain Lake Park by 1927. The final portion of MD 41 was completed in 1938. The state highway was replaced by MD 135 in 1956.

== MD 44 ==
Maryland Route 44
- Location: Big Pool
- Existed: 1946–1969

Maryland Route 44 was the designation for the access road from MD 56 south to Fort Frederick State Park near Big Pool in western Washington County. The access road was designated MD 44 between 1946 and 1969.

== MD 46 ==
Maryland Route 46
- Location: Linthicum
- Existed: 1950–1990

Maryland Route 46 is the former designation of the segment of I-195 between MD 295 and BWI Airport in Linthicum in northwestern Anne Arundel County. MD 46 was assigned when the connector between the Baltimore–Washington Expressway and the new Friendship International Airport opened in 1950. The designation was replaced by I-195 when the Interstate fully opened in 1990.

== MD 48 ==
Maryland Route 48
- Location: Dickens
- Existed: 1927–1950

Maryland Route 48 was the designation for Pine Ridge Road from US 220 northeast to the Pennsylvania state line near Dickens in central Allegany County. The highway was constructed as a concrete road by 1927. MD 48 was removed from the state highway system in 1950.

== MD 52 ==
Maryland Route 52
- Location: Cumberland–Evitts Creek
- Existed: 1927–1956

Maryland Route 52 was the designation for Williams Street and Williams Road from MD 51 in Cumberland east to Christie Road near Evitts Creek in central Allegany County. MD 52 began at MD 51, which followed Williams Street northwest toward downtown Cumberland and Louisiana Avenue south toward Oldtown. The highway was paved a concrete road from Cumberland to near Evitts Creek in 1923. MD 52 was extended east across Evitts Creek to Brashier Hollow Road by 1939. The highway was extended to Christie Road when the state rebuilt Williams Road between Brashier Hollow Road and Christie Road in 1952. MD 52 was removed from the state highway system in 1956. Part of MD 52's old course was brought back into the state highway system when MD 639 was extended south in 2008.

== MD 54 (1933–1956) ==
Maryland Route 54
- Location: Myersville
- Existed: 1933–1956

Maryland Route 54 was the designation for the portion of Main Street north of MD 17 in the town of Myersville and Canada Hill Road from the Myersville town limit to the road's intersection with Easterday Road in western Frederick County. MD 54 was constructed as a concrete road in Myersville in 1933. The highway was extended north to Easterday Road by 1946. MD 54 was removed from the state highway system in 1956 immediately after the state resurfaced the route.

== MD 59 ==
Maryland Route 59
- Location: Jefferson–Middletown
- Existed: 1929–1956

Maryland Route 59 was the designation for Holter Road from US 340 in Jefferson north to MD 17 in Middletown in western Frederick County. Construction on the concrete highway began from the Middletown end and the first section was completed in 1929. A second segment of MD 59 was started in 1929 and completed in 1930. The third portion of the highway was started in 1930. MD 59 was extended south to Teen Barnes Road near Jefferson in 1933. The highway was proposed to extend to US 340 in 1933. However, MD 59 was not completed until the final stretch from Teen Barnes Road to US 340 was completed as a 16-foot-wide (4.9 m) concrete road in 1938. MD 59 was removed from the state highway system in 1956.

== MD 61 (1927–1956) ==
Maryland Route 61
- Location: Hagerstown
- Existed: 1927–1956

Maryland Route 61 was the designation for a section of Old Forge Road from Antietam Drive eastward near Hagerstown in northern Washington County. The highway was constructed by Washington County with state aid in 1916. MD 61 was removed from the state highway system in 1956; part of the route's former path is now occupied by a quarry.

== MD 69 ==
Maryland Route 69
- Location: Braddock Heights
- Existed: 1927–1956

Maryland Route 69 was the designation for Jefferson Boulevard and Maryland Avenue from Mount Zion Road north to US 40 Alternate in Braddock Heights in western Frederick County. MD 69 was paved by Frederick County with state aid by 1911. The highway was removed from the state highway system in 1956.

== MD 70 (1927–1950) ==
Maryland Route 70
- Location: Knoxville–Brunswick
- Existed: 1927–1950

Maryland Route 70 was the designation for Knoxville Road from US 340 in Knoxville east to Brunswick in western Frederick County. MD 70 was constructed by 1927. The highway was replaced with a westward extension of MD 464 in 1950. MD 478 was assigned to Knoxville Road by 1971.

== MD 71 (1927–1956) ==
Maryland Route 71
- Location: Ceresville–Taneytown
- Existed: 1927–1956

Maryland Route 71 was the designation for what is now MD 194 from MD 26 in Ceresville to the Pennsylvania state line near Taneytown in Frederick and Carroll counties. Much of the highway was constructed in Frederick County by 1927. MD 71 was changed to MD 194 in 1956 to match Pennsylvania Route 194, taking its number from the original MD 194 and handing the number to much of what is now US 301.

== MD 71 (1956–1959) ==
Maryland Route 71
- Location: Queenstown–Warwick
- Existed: 1956–1959

Maryland Route 71 was the designation for the Blue Star Memorial Highway from US 50 in Queenstown to the Delaware state line near Warwick. MD 71 was assigned to the highway when it was completed in 1956. US 301 replaced the highway when the U.S. Highway was extended into Delaware in 1959. MD 71 connected to Delaware Route 71 at the state line during its short existence.

== MD 72 ==
Maryland Route 72
- Location: Lewistown–Creagerstown
- Existed: 1927–1956

Maryland Route 72 was the designation for Lewistown Road, Old Frederick Road, and Creagerstown Road from US 15 in Lewistown east and then north through Creagerstown to a point south of MD 77 near Loys Station between Thurmont and Rocky Ridge in northern Frederick County. MD 72 was constructed as a concrete road by Frederick County with state aid from Lewistown to Links Bridge Road south of Creagerstown between 1919 and 1921. The highway was extended as a concrete road to the south end of Creagerstown in 1925 and 1926 and through Creagerstown in 1926 and 1927. MD 72 was extended to its northern terminus south of Loys Station in 1932. All of MD 72 except the portion through Creagerstown that is now MD 550 was removed from the state highway system in 1956.

== MD 73 ==
Maryland Route 73
- Location: Frederick–Yellow Springs
- Existed: 1928–1969

Maryland Route 73 was the designation for Yellow Springs Road from the old Frederick city limits on what is now 7th Street south of the US 15 freeway north to Yellow Springs. The first section of MD 73 was constructed as a macadam road for about 1 mile (1.6 km) north of the city limits in 1928. The highway was extended northwest to what is now Clover Hill by 1930 and to Tuscarora Creek by 1933. MD 73 was completed to Yellow Springs in 1935. MD 73 between Military Road and Clover Hill passed along the edge of and then directly through Fort Detrick until 1957, when the road through the military base was closed to the public. Yellow Springs Road was relocated around Fort Detrick from Clover Hill southeast to connect with Rosemont Avenue in Frederick. By 1961, the southern end of MD 73 was at Clover Hill. The remainder of MD 73 was removed from the state highway system in 1969.

== MD 74 ==
Maryland Route 74
- Location: Frederick
- Existed: 1928–1956

Maryland Route 74 was the designation for Oppossumtown Pike from the old Frederick city limits on what is now Motter Avenue south of the US 15 freeway north to Poole Jones Road. MD 74 was paved as a macadam road north about 1.2 miles (1.9 km) from the city limits between 1926 and 1928. The highway was extended north to its northern terminus by 1939. MD 74 was removed from the state highway system in 1956.

== MD 78 ==
Maryland Route 78
- Location: Adamstown–Frederick
- Existed: 1927–1970

Maryland Route 78 was the designation for Ballenger Creek Pike from what was the southern terminus of MD 351 near Adamstown north to US 340 near Frederick in southern Frederick County. The first portion of MD 78 was completed by 1927; the remainder of the highway was completed by 1938. MD 78 was replaced by an extension of MD 180 in 1970. All of former MD 78 became MD 351 in 1989.

== MD 81 ==
Maryland Route 81
- Location: Thurmont–Fort Ritchie
- Existed: 1927–1977

Maryland Route 81 was the designation for Sabillasville Road and Military Road from MD 806 (former US 15) in Thurmont north to Fort Ritchie in northwestern Frederick County and far northeastern Washington County. MD 81 was completed from Thurmont to Sabillasville by 1927. The highway was replaced by a northern extension of MD 550 in 1977.

== MD 82 ==
Maryland Route 82
- Location: Bethesda–Chevy Chase
- Existed: 1929–1997

Maryland Route 82 was the designation for Leland Avenue and Maple Avenue from MD 191 in Bethesda east to MD 410 in Chevy Chase in southern Montgomery County. MD 82 constructed in three sections. Leland Avenue from MD 191 through the intersection with US 240 (now MD 355) to 46th Street in Bethesda and Maple Avenue in Chevy Chase were paved in concrete in 1929. The middle segment along Leland Avenue in the town of Chevy Chase was constructed by the town; the macadam street was brought into the state highway system in 1933. The portion of MD 82 through the town was transferred to municipal maintenance by 1985. The portion of MD 82 in Bethesda was transferred to Montgomery County in 1997.

== MD 83 ==
Maryland Route 83
- Location: New Windsor

Maryland Route 83 was assigned to a very short inner-city street, Church St., in New Windsor.

== MD 85 (1927–1956) ==
Maryland Route 85
- Location: Middleburg
- Existed: 1927–1956

Maryland Route 85 was the designation for an L-shaped highway through Middleburg in western Carroll County. MD 85 began at the Western Maryland Railway along Johnsville Road south of Middleburg, then turned east on Middleburg Road to its end east of Bucher John Road near the hamlet of Feesersburg. The highway was constructed by Carroll County with state aid as a 14-foot-wide (4.3 m) macadam road between 1911 and 1915. MD 85 was removed from the state highway system in 1956.

== MD 87 ==
Maryland Route 87
- Location: Carrollton–Mexico
- Existed: 1927–1956

Maryland Route 87 was the designation for the portion of Leisters Church Road from a point near Dufrow Road and Neudecker Road near Carrollton north to MD 31 in Mexico in eastern Carroll County. MD 87 was paved as a concrete road from MD 31 (now MD 852) in Mexico southeast to Gorsuch Road in 1925. The highway was extended to its southern end in 1933. MD 87 south of MD 482 was transferred to county control in 1956; the portion in Mexico became a western extension of MD 482. Around 1960, MD 482 was relocated on its current course west to a relocation of MD 31, which later became MD 27. The portion of Leisters Church Road between MD 852 and MD 482 is now MD 849.

== MD 89 ==
Maryland Route 89
- Location: Hampstead
- Existed: 1927–1956

Maryland Route 89 was the designation for Lower Beckleysville Road from MD 88 in Hampstead east to the Carroll–Baltimore county line. The highway was constructed by Carroll County with state aid as a 15-foot-wide (4.6 m) concrete road between 1919 and 1921. MD 89 was removed from the state highway system in 1956.

== MD 90 (1927–1956) ==
Maryland Route 90
- Location: Houcksville–Hampstead
- Existed: 1927–1956

Maryland Route 90 was the designation for the portion of Houcksville Road from a point near Hoffman Mill Road near Houcksville north to MD 30 (now MD 30 Business) in Hampstead in eastern Carroll County. The highway was paved by Carroll County with state aid as a 14-foot-wide (4.3 m) macadam road between 1911 and 1915. MD 90 was removed from the state highway system in 1956.

== MD 92 ==
Maryland Route 92
- Location: Smithsburg
- Existed: 1934–1956

Maryland Route 92 was the designation for Water Street and Fruit Tree Drive from MD 64 (now MD 66) in Smithsburg to east of Greensburg Road east of Smithsburg in northeastern Washington County. The highway was constructed as a macadam road in 1934. MD 92 was removed from the state highway system in 1956. The following year, MD 491 was completed parallel to old MD 92 near Smithsburg. There may have been another segment of MD 92 from the Western Maryland Railway crossing at Edgemont north to Mong Road northeast of Smithsburg built by 1939. (Note that Google Maps shows another MD 92 from MD 64 via Rowe Road to Unger Road (probably decommissioned much more recently).

== MD 93 ==
Maryland Route 93
- Location: Shervettes Corner
- Existed: 1927–1956

Maryland Route 93 was the designation for Oakland Mills Road and Oakland Road from MD 26 at Shervettes Corner north and east to the Carroll–Baltimore county line at the North Branch of the Patapsco River. The highway was constructed by Carroll County with state aid as a 15-foot-wide (4.6 m) concrete road between 1919 and 1921. MD 93 connected with Oakland Road on the Baltimore County side of the river, but that connection was severed when Liberty Reservoir filled in 1954. The state highway was transferred to county maintenance in 1956.

== MD 95 ==
Maryland Route 95
- Location: Comus
- Length: 0.85 mi (1,370 m)
- Existed: 1930–1999

Maryland Route 95 was the designation of the 0.85-mile (1.37 km) portion of Comus Road west from MD 109 at Comus in northern Montgomery County. The highway was constructed as a concrete road in 1929 and 1930. MD 95 was transferred from state to county maintenance in 1999 as part of the highway swap to designate the Great Seneca Highway as MD 119.

== MD 96 ==
Maryland Route 96
- Location: Glenwood–Lisbon
- Existed: 1927–1956

Maryland Route 96 was the designation for Daisy Road from Union Chapel Road near Glenwood north to MD 144, which had previously been US 40, near Lisbon in western Howard County. The highway was constructed by Howard County with state aid as a 14-foot-wide (4.3 m) macadam road by 1911 and was completed by 1915. MD 96 was removed from the state highway system in 1956.

== MD 98 ==
Maryland Route 98
- Location: Glenelg–Ellicott City
- Existed: 1927–1956

Maryland Route 98 was the designation for Folly Quarter Road, an L-shaped route between MD 32 in Glenelg and MD 144, which had previously been US 40, near Ellicott City in central Howard County. The highway was constructed as a concrete road from the National Pike south and west to near Glenelg by 1921 and completed in 1923. MD 98 was removed from the state highway system in 1956.

== MD 100 (1927–1956) ==
Maryland Route 100
- Location: Ellicott City
- Existed: 1927–1956

Maryland Route 100 was the designation for the portion of Old Frederick Road from MD 99 at St. Johns Lane near Ellicott City east to the Howard–Baltimore county line at the Patapsco River. Much of the highway was constructed as a macadam road from the river west to approximately the modern intersection of US 29 and MD 99 in 1923. The gap from there to MD 99 was filled with a concrete road between 1930 and 1933. In 1956, the portion of MD 100 from MD 99 at St. Johns Lane to Rogers Avenue was replaced with an extension of MD 99 east along Old Frederick Road and south along Rogers Avenue; the portion of MD 100 east of Rogers Avenue was transferred to county maintenance.

== MD 101 ==
Maryland Route 101
- Location: West Friendship–Henryton
- Existed: 1927–1956

Maryland Route 101 was the designation for Henryton Road from MD 99 near West Friendship north to the Howard–Carroll county line at the South Branch of the Patapsco River at Henryton. The highway was constructed as a concrete road between 1924 and 1926. MD 101 was removed from the state highway system in 1956.

== MD 102 ==
Maryland Route 102
- Location: Ellicott City
- Existed: 1927–1956

Maryland Route 102 was the designation for Maryland Avenue, St. Paul Street, and part of College Avenue in the center of Ellicott City in northeastern Howard County. The highway was improved as a concrete road in 1923. MD 102 was widened and resurfaced in 1954, then removed from the state highway system in 1956.

== MD 104 (1927–1956) ==
Maryland Route 104
- Location: Ilchester
- Existed: 1927–1956

Maryland Route 104 was the designation for Ilchester Road from MD 103 near Ellicott City north to the Howard–Baltimore county line at the Patapsco River at Ilchester. The highway was paved from the river south to Landing Road by 1910. The remainder of MD 104 south to MD 103 was constructed between 1930 and 1932. MD 104 was transferred to Howard County maintenance in 1956.

== MD 105 ==
Maryland Route 105
- Location: Ellicott City
- Existed: 1927–1956

Maryland Route 105 was the designation for Rogers Avenue from former MD 144 (Main Street) north to former MD 100 (Old Frederick Road) in Ellicott City. The highway was constructed as a concrete road from Main Street to Ridge Road in 1923 and extended to its northern end in 1924 and 1925. MD 105 was widened and resurfaced in 1953, then replaced by an extension of MD 99 in 1956.

== MD 106 ==
Maryland Route 106
- Location: Glenelg–Savage
- Existed: 1927–1946

Maryland Route 106 was the designation for Ten Oaks Road from Glenelg to US 29 (now MD 108) in Clarksville and Guilford Road from there to US 1 in Savage in central and southern Howard County. The highway was mostly constructed with concrete, macadam, and gravel segments by 1927. By 1946, MD 106 was replaced by a southern extension of MD 32 over its whole length.

== MD 110 ==
Maryland Route 110
- Location: Mount Airy
- Existed: c. 1948–c. 1949

Maryland Route 110 was the designation for Woodville Road from Old Annapolis Road north to Shirley Bohn Road northwest of Mount Airy in southeastern Frederick County. The highway was assigned by 1948 but may have been removed by 1949.

== MD 114 ==
Maryland Route 114
- Location: Gaithersburg
- Existed: 1930–1974

Maryland Route 114 was the designation for Goshen Road from MD 124 (now East Diamond Avenue) north to near Emory Grove Road in Gaithersburg. The highway was constructed between 1928 and 1930. MD 114 was removed from the state highway system in 1974.

== MD 116 ==
Maryland Route 116
- Location: Ashton–Brinklow
- Existed: 1928–1960

Maryland Route 116 was the designation for what is now New Hampshire Avenue from US 29 and MD 108 in Ashton north to what is now Brighton Dam Road near Brinklow in northern Montgomery County. The highway was paved as a concrete road from Ashton to the Hawlings River at Brinklow in 1928 and extended as a macadam road to Brighton in 1930. In 1960, MD 116 was replaced with MD 650 when that highway was extended north replacing US 29 from White Oak to Ashton; MD 108 replaced US 29 east from Ashton contemporaneously.

== MD 119 (1927–1958) ==
Maryland Route 119
- Location: Montgomery County
- Existed: 1927–1958

Maryland Route 119 was the designation for three disjoint segments of state highway in Germantown and Dawsonville in western Montgomery County. The designation was applied to parts of Sugarland Road and White Ground Road near Dawsonville and Schaeffer Road near Germantown. The Sugarland Road segment was partial constructed by 1927. The two Dawsonville sections became part of MD 121 in 1952; Schaeffer Road received that designation the following year. Schaeffer Road became MD 119 again in 1956, but was removed from the state highway system in 1958.

== MD 120 ==
Maryland Route 120
- Location: Germantown
- Existed: 1930–1999

Maryland Route 120 was the designation for a pair of highways near MD 118 in Germantown in northern Montgomery County. The designation was first applied to Waters Road from MD 118 at the Baltimore and Ohio Railroad north to the site of what is now I-270. MD 120 was paved as a macadam road from MD 118 along the portion of Waters Road that still exists in Germantown and as a concrete road northeast from there in 1930. By 1978, MD 120 existed in two segments: the extant portion of Waters Road, and an L-shaped portion closer to I-270 that included Aircraft Drive northwest from MD 118 parallel to I-270 and a road that no longer exists heading northeast from the end of Aircraft Drive to a dead end at I-270. The road from the end of Aircraft Drive was removed from the state highway system in 1981. Both remaining segments of MD 120 were removed from the state highway system in 1999 as part of the highway swap to designate the Great Seneca Highway as MD 119.

== MD 122 (1927–1974) ==
Maryland Route 122
- Location: Damascus
- Existed: 1927–1974

Maryland Route 122 was the designation for Bethesda Church Road from MD 27 in Damascus west to Clarksburg Road in northern Montgomery County. The highway was constructed as a concrete road from the original MD 29 (now MD 27) west to beyond MD 123 (Johnson Drive) between 1924 and 1926. MD 122 was extended as a macadam road to Clarksburg Road in the village of Browningsville in 1929 and 1930. The highway was removed from the state highway system in 1974.

== MD 123 ==
Maryland Route 123
- Location: Hyattstown–Damascus
- Existed: 1927–1974

Maryland Route 123 was the designation for a highway that followed what are today Lewisdale Road, Clarksburg Road, Prices Distillery Road, Mountain View Road, and Johnson Lane from MD 75 near Hyattstown east to MD 122 near Damascus in northern Montgomery County and the southeastern edge of Frederick County. A very short piece of concrete road was built west from MD 122 by 1927. MD 123 was extended as a macadam road to Burnt Hill Road in the hamlet of Purdum and as a concrete road from there to Lewisdale Road by 1930. The highway was extended to Clarksburg Road in the village of Lewisdale in 1933 and 1934. MD 123 was extended west to MD 75 by 1946. The Frederick County portion of the highway was transferred to county control by 1961. The Montgomery County section of MD 123 was removed from the state highway system in 1974.

== MD 126 ==
Maryland Route 126
- Location: Woodlawn–Baltimore
- Existed: 1927–1999

Maryland Route 126 was the designation of Gwynn Oak Avenue from Windsor Mill Road in Woodlawn in western Baltimore County to MD 26 in Baltimore. The highway was paved as a macadam road by 1910; at that time, the entire road was in Baltimore County. MD 126 was improved in the city in 1929 and 1930. The highway was expanded to a four-lane divided boulevard from the city limits west to Gwynn Oak Park in 1940. MD 126 was removed from the state highway system in 1999.

== MD 127 ==
Maryland Route 127
- Location: Reisterstown–Glyndon
- Existed: 1927–1987

Maryland Route 127 was the designation for Chatsworth Avenue from MD 140, which had previously been US 140, in Reisterstown east to the Western Maryland Railway at Glyndon in western Baltimore County. The highway was paved by Baltimore County with state aid as a macadam road by 1910. MD 127 was originally removed from the state highway system in 1955. Chatsworth Avenue became a state highway again in 1972 but was returned to Baltimore County maintenance again in 1987.

== MD 132 (1930–1961) ==
Maryland Route 132
- Location: Mays Chapel
- Existed: 1930–1961

Maryland Route 132 was the designation for Mays Chapel Road from MD 131 north to Timonium Road in Mays Chapel in central Baltimore County. The highway was paved as a concrete road in 1930. MD 132 was removed from the state highway system by 1961.

== MD 141 ==
Maryland Route 141
- Location: Towson
- Existed: 1927–1961

Maryland Route 141 was the designation for Allegheny Avenue from MD 139 (Charles Street Avenue) east to US 111 (now MD 45), MD 146, and MD 148 (Joppa Road) in Towson in central Baltimore County. Allegheny Avenue was constructed as a concrete road by Baltimore County with state aid by 1921. MD 141 was removed from the state highway system in 1961.

== MD 142 ==
Maryland Route 142
- Location: White Hall–Shawsville
- Existed: 1927–1981

Maryland Route 142 was the designation for two portions of state highway along White Hall Road in northeastern Baltimore County and northwestern Harford County. The western segment extended from Weisburg Road at White Hall east to Kings Road. The eastern segment began at Vernon Road east of White Hall and extended to MD 23 in Shawsville. The western segment and the short Harford County portion of the eastern segment were paved by their respective counties with state aid as macadam roads by 1911. The Baltimore County portion of the eastern segment of MD 142 was built as a concrete road by 1921. Both segments of MD 142 were removed from the state highway system in 1981.

== MD 143 ==
Maryland Route 143
- Location: Cockeysville–Jacksonville
- Existed: 1927–1983

Maryland Route 143 was the designation for two segments of highway between Cockeysville and Jacksonville in central Baltimore County. The western segment followed Warren Road from MD 45, which was previously US 111, near Cockeysville east to the Loch Raven Reservoir reservation near Bosley Road. The eastern segment followed Merrymans Mill Road from the reservoir reservation east to MD 146 near Jacksonville. The western section of MD 143 was constructed by Baltimore County with state aid as a 12-foot-wide (3.7 m) concrete road between 1911 and 1915. The eastern section was built as a concrete road in 1929. Both portions of MD 143 were transferred to county maintenance in 1983.

== MD 144 (1927–1940) ==
Maryland Route 144
- Location: Towson–Hampton
- Existed: 1927–1940

Maryland Route 144 was the designation for Dulaney Valley Road from US 111 (now MD 45) in Towson north to Hampton Lane in Hampton in central Baltimore County. The highway was paved as a concrete road by 1927. MD 144 became part of MD 146 in 1940.

== MD 148 ==
Maryland Route 148
- Location: Towson–Perry Hall
- Existed: 1927–1963

Maryland Route 148 was the designation for Joppa Road from US 111 (now MD 45) and MD 146 in Towson east to US 1 in Perry Hall in Baltimore County. The first section of the highway was paved from US 1 to MD 147 in Carney by 1927 and extended to Towson by 1933. MD 148 was removed from the state highway system in 1963, the same year the parallel I-695 was completed.

== MD 149 ==
Maryland Route 149
- Location: White Marsh–Chase
- Existed: 1927–1966

Maryland Route 149 was the designation for the portion of Ebenezer Road from Bird River Road east of US 40 near White Marsh east to near MD 150 near Chase in eastern Baltimore County. The highway was constructed as a concrete road in 1924 and 1925. MD 149 was removed from the state highway system in 1966. However, the MD 149 designation was used for the proposed Windlass Freeway.

== MD 153 ==
Maryland Route 153
- Location: Myersville–Wolfsville
- Existed: 1956–1985

Maryland Route 153 was the designation for Wolfsville Road from I-70 in Myersville north to the Frederick–Washington county line near Wolfsville in western Frederick County. Portions of the highway were constructed by 1927 as part of former MD 33, which became MD 17 in 1940. The portion of MD 17 between US 40 Alternate in Middletown and US 40 in Myersville was transferred to Frederick County in 1956. The portion south of Middletown remained MD 17 and the part north of Myersville became MD 153. MD 153 was extended south from US 40 through Myersville to I-70 in 1979. The Middletown–Myersville highway returned to state maintenance in 1985; MD 17 was extended north from Middletown to the county line near Wolfsville, replacing MD 153.

== MD 154 ==
Maryland Route 154
- Location: Churchville–Kalmia
- Existed: 1927–1955

Maryland Route 154 was the designation for Thomas Run Road from MD 22 near Churchville north to Cool Spring Road near Kalmia in central Harford County. The first segment of the macadam highway was built from MD 22 at Fulford or Shuck's Corner halfway to Medical Hall Road. MD 154 was extended to Pennington Road by 1930. The highway was completed to its northern terminus in 1932. MD 154 was removed from the state highway system in 1955.

== MD 157 (1927–1956) ==
Maryland Route 157
- Location: Havre de Grace
- Existed: 1927–1956

Maryland Route 157 was the designation for Chapel Road from MD 462 north of Aberdeen east to the Havre de Grace city limit near Tydings Road in southeastern Harford County. Chapel Road was paved as a 12-foot-wide (3.7 m) macadam road by Harford County with state aid from the city limit west to near Robinhood Road by 1915. The highway was extended west to MD 462 in 1938. MD 157 was removed from the state highway system in 1956.

== MD 158 (1927–1956) ==
Maryland Route 158
- Location: Belcamp
- Existed: 1927–1956

Maryland Route 158 was the designation for Belcamp Road from US 40 north to Creswell Road in Belcamp in southeastern Harford County. Belcamp Road was constructed as a 12-foot-wide (3.7 m) macadam road from the Baltimore and Ohio Railroad north to Creswell Road by 1915. MD 158 was removed from the state highway system in 1956.

== MD 160 ==
Maryland Route 160
- Location: Darlington
- Existed: 1930–1955

Maryland Route 160 was the designation for Shuresville Road from MD 161 in Darlington northeast to US 1 at its crossing of the Susquehanna River at Conowingo Dam in northeastern Harford County. The highway was constructed as a macadam road in 1930. MD 160 was removed from the state highway system in 1955.

== MD 162 (1928–1956) ==
Maryland Route 162
- Location: Darlington
- Existed: 1928–1956

Maryland Route 162 was the designation for Berkley Road from U.S. Route 1 in Maryland near Darlington northeast to the Susquehanna River at Glen Cove in northeastern Harford County. The highway was constructed as one of the original state roads planned by the Maryland State Roads Commission in 1909. Berkley Road was under construction in 1911 and completed as a 14-foot-wide (4.3 m) macadam road in 1913. The highway was part of the original route of US 1; the road served as the western approach to the Conowingo Bridge that crossed the river upstream of Glen Cove. In 1928, US 1 was relocated to its present course on the western approach to Conowingo Dam; MD 162 was assigned to the Berkley Road portion of the old route. MD 162 was removed from the state highway system in 1956.

== MD 163 ==
Maryland Route 163
- Location: Pylesville
- Existed: 1933–1955

Maryland Route 163 was the designation for Fawn Grove Road from MD 165 north to near Deer Creek west of Pylesville and north of Jarrettsville in northern Harford County. The highway was built as a concrete road in 1933. MD 163 was removed from the state highway system in 1955.

== MD 164 ==
Maryland Route 164
- Location: Carpenter Point–Charlestown
- Length: 2.63 mi (4.23 km)
- Existed: 1933–1979

Maryland Route 164 was the designation for Carpenters Point Road, which ran 2.63 miles (4.23 km) from Carpenter Point north to MD 267 in Charlestown in southwestern Cecil County. The highway was constructed as a gravel road between 1930 and 1933. All of MD 164 outside of the town of Charlestown was transferred from state to county maintenance through a road transfer agreement on May 8, 1958. The Charlestown snippet of MD 164 was transferred from state to county maintenance by a December 27, 1979, road transfer agreement.

== MD 167 ==
Maryland Route 167
- Location: Ferndale–Linthicum
- Existed: 1929–1974

Maryland Route 167 was the twice-used designation for two separate portions of Hammonds Ferry Road in northern Anne Arundel County. The first MD 167 ran from MD 170 in Linthicum north to the Patapsco River. That highway was constructed as a 16-foot-wide (4.9 m) concrete road in 1929. The first MD 167 was removed from the state highway system in 1962. The second MD 167 followed Hammonds Ferry Road from MD 176 near Ferndale north to MD 170 in Linthicum. This highway was taken over by the state in 1969 and returned to Anne Arundel County in 1974. The second routing of MD 167 was brought back into the state highway system as MD 162 in 1987.

== MD 180 (1930–1946) ==
Maryland Route 180
- Location: Odenton–Millersville
- Existed: 1930–c. 1946

Maryland Route 180 was the designation for Annapolis Road from an entrance to Fort Meade near Odenton east to US 301 (now MD 3) in Millersville in western Anne Arundel County. The first section of the highway was completed from MD 3 west to Gambrills in 1930. By 1946, MD 180 was replaced by an eastward extension of MD 175.

== MD 183 ==
Maryland Route 183
- Location: Glenmont–Colesville
- Existed: 1927–1981

Maryland Route 183 was the designation for the portion of Randolph Road between MD 97 in Glenmont and MD 650 in Colesville in eastern Montgomery County. MD 183 was constructed by 1927 and transferred to county maintenance in 1981.

== MD 184 ==
Maryland Route 184
- Location: Silver Spring
- Length: 0.36 mi (580 m)
- Existed: 1927–1999

Maryland Route 184 was the designation for Blair Road, which ran 0.36 miles (0.58 km) from US 29 and Eastern Avenue in Silver Spring east to another intersection with Eastern Avenue where Blair Road enters Washington, D.C. in southeastern Montgomery County. The highway was constructed as a macadam road in 1923. MD 184 was removed from the state highway system in 1999 as part of the highway swap to designate the Great Seneca Highway as MD 119.

== MD 194 (1927–1956) ==
Maryland Route 194
- Location: Takoma Park–Silver Spring
- Existed: 1927–1956

Maryland Route 194 was the designation for Flower Avenue from MD 195 in Takoma Park north to former MD 516 in Silver Spring in southeastern Montgomery County. The highway was paved from MD 195 to MD 320 by 1927. MD 194 was involved in a three-way number swap in 1956; the original MD 71 became modern MD 194 and MD 71 was applied to what is now US 301 from Queenstown to the Delaware state line. The original MD 194 became MD 787, which was removed from the state highway system in 2012.

== MD 196 ==
Maryland Route 196
- Location: White Oak–Burtonsville
- Existed: 1930–1999

Maryland Route 196 was the designation for Columbia Pike from US 29 in White Oak north to MD 198 in Burtonsville in eastern Montgomery County. The highway was built as a macadam road from White Oak north to Randolph Road in 1930 and completed to Burtonsville by 1933. MD 196 was temporarily applied to the course of modern Columbia Pike from Burtonsville to Columbia after that part of the highway was completed in 1953. The parallel divided highway Columbia Pike was completed from north of Paint Branch to Burtonsville in 1956; MD 196 was removed from Howard County the same year. MD 196 was applied to the portion of the new highway from Paint Branch to White Oak until US 29 was placed on the new Columbia Pike in 1960. MD 196 was split in two when its bridge across Paint Branch was closed in 1966. The main portion of Columbia Pike on the west side of US 29 from north of Paint Branch to Burtonsville was transferred to county control between 1975 and 1977. The two segments of MD 196 on either side of Paint Branch on the east side of US 29 remained until they were transferred to county maintenance in 1999.

== MD 199 ==
Maryland Route 199
- Location: Glenn Dale
- Existed: 1927–1954

Maryland Route 199 was the designation for Glenn Dale Road from US 50 (now MD 450) north to the Washington, Baltimore and Annapolis Electric Railway in Glenn Dale in central Prince George's County. The highway was constructed as a gravel road by 1927. MD 199 was removed from the state highway system in 1954. The course of MD 199 returned to state maintenance when MD 193 was extended along Glenn Dale Road in 1965. After MD 193 was relocated through Glenn Dale in 1985, Glenn Dale Road became MD 953.
