= Evitts Creek =

Evitts Creek may refer to:

- Evitts Creek, Maryland, an unincorporated community
- Evitts Creek (North Branch Potomac River), a tributary of the North Branch Potomac River
