= Evitts =

Evitts may refer to:

People

- Neil Evitts

Communities

- Evitts Creek, Maryland, Allegany County

Geography

- Evitts Mountain, in Bedford County, Pennsylvania and Allegany County, Maryland
- Evitts Creek (North Branch Potomac River), a tributary of the North Branch Potomac River
