= Little Catoctin Creek (Potomac River tributary) =

Creek in Maryland, United States

Coordinates: 39°29′42.5″N 77°33′31.9″W

Little Catoctin Creek is an 8.5-mile-long (13.7 km) tributary of the Potomac River in Frederick County, Maryland. The creek starts south of Burkittsville and flows to the southeast, passing north of Brunswick before emptying into the Potomac west of Lander.

The name is also used for two tributaries of Catoctin Creek near Myersville.
