= Maryland Route 639 =

State highway in Maryland, United States

Maryland Route 639
- Maryland Route 639 highlighted in red

Route information
- Maintained by MDSHA
- Length: 2.79 mi (4.49 km)
- Existed: 1970–present

Major junctions
- South end: MD 51 in Evitts Creek
- North end: I-68 / US 40 / US 220 / US 40 Alt. in Cumberland

Location
- Country: United States
- State: Maryland
- Counties: Allegany

Highway system
- Maryland highway system; Interstate; US; State; Scenic Byways
← MD 638	→ MD 640

Maryland Route 639 (MD 639) is a state highway in the U.S. state of Maryland. The state highway runs 2.79 miles (4.49 km) from MD 51 in Evitts Creek north to Interstate 68 (I-68), U.S. Route 40 (US 40), US 220, and US 40 Alternate in Cumberland. MD 639 provides access to Allegany College of Maryland and UPMC Western Maryland hospital, which opened in November 2009. The Willowbrook Road portion of the state highway was constructed in the late 1960s. MD 639 was extended south to MD 51 in 2008.

== Route description ==
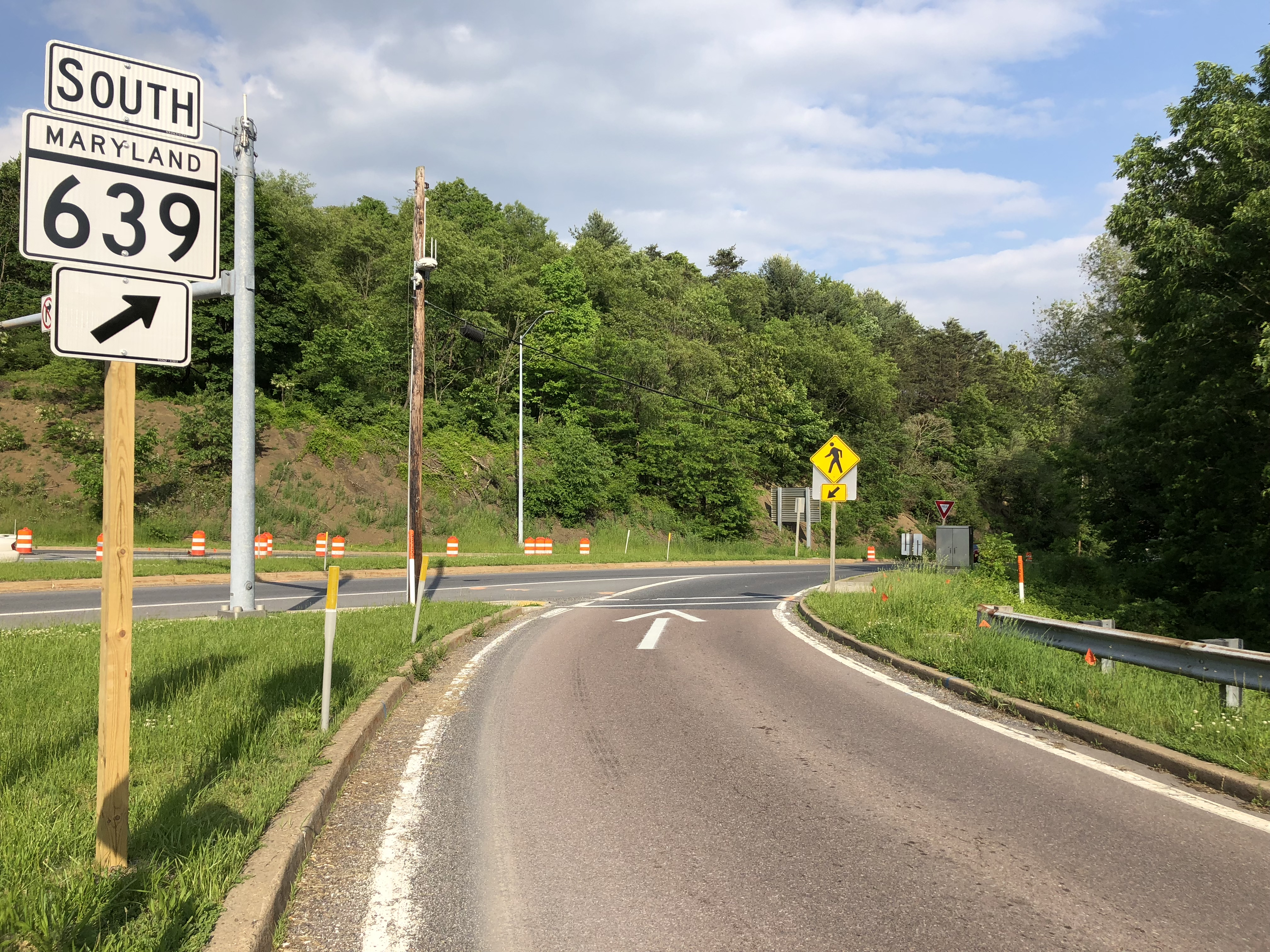
Signage for MD 639 on the ramp from I-68 eastbound/US 40 eastbound/US 220 northbound in Cumberland

MD 639 begins at an intersection with MD 51 (Oldtown Road) in Evitts Creek. The state highway heads north as two-lane Messick Road, paralleling the east side of Evitts Creek. At the northern end of Messick Road, MD 639 turns onto Williams Road, which continues to follow Evitts Creek. After crossing the creek, MD 639 turns north onto Willowbrook Road, a two-lane undivided road that passes through two roundabouts at the entrance to the UPMC Western Maryland hospital and then enters the city limits of Cumberland. After passing the entrance to Allegany College of Maryland, MD 639 turns northwest, passing Country Club Road before reaching its northern terminus at a diamond interchange with I-68, US 40, and US 220 (National Freeway). The roadway continues as US 40 Alternate (Baltimore Avenue), which heads toward downtown Cumberland.

== History ==
The first section of present-day MD 639 to become a state highway was the Williams Road segment, which was designated part of MD 52 by 1939. MD 52 was removed from the state highway system in 1956. Willowbrook Road between I-68 and Country Club Road was improved as a county highway in 1968 concurrent with the completion of the Cumberland Thruway east of downtown Cumberland. Willowbrook Road was extended on a new alignment south to Williams Road and brought into the state highway system as MD 639 in 1970. In 2008, MD 639 was extended south along Williams Road and Messick Road to its present southern terminus at MD 51.

== Junction list ==
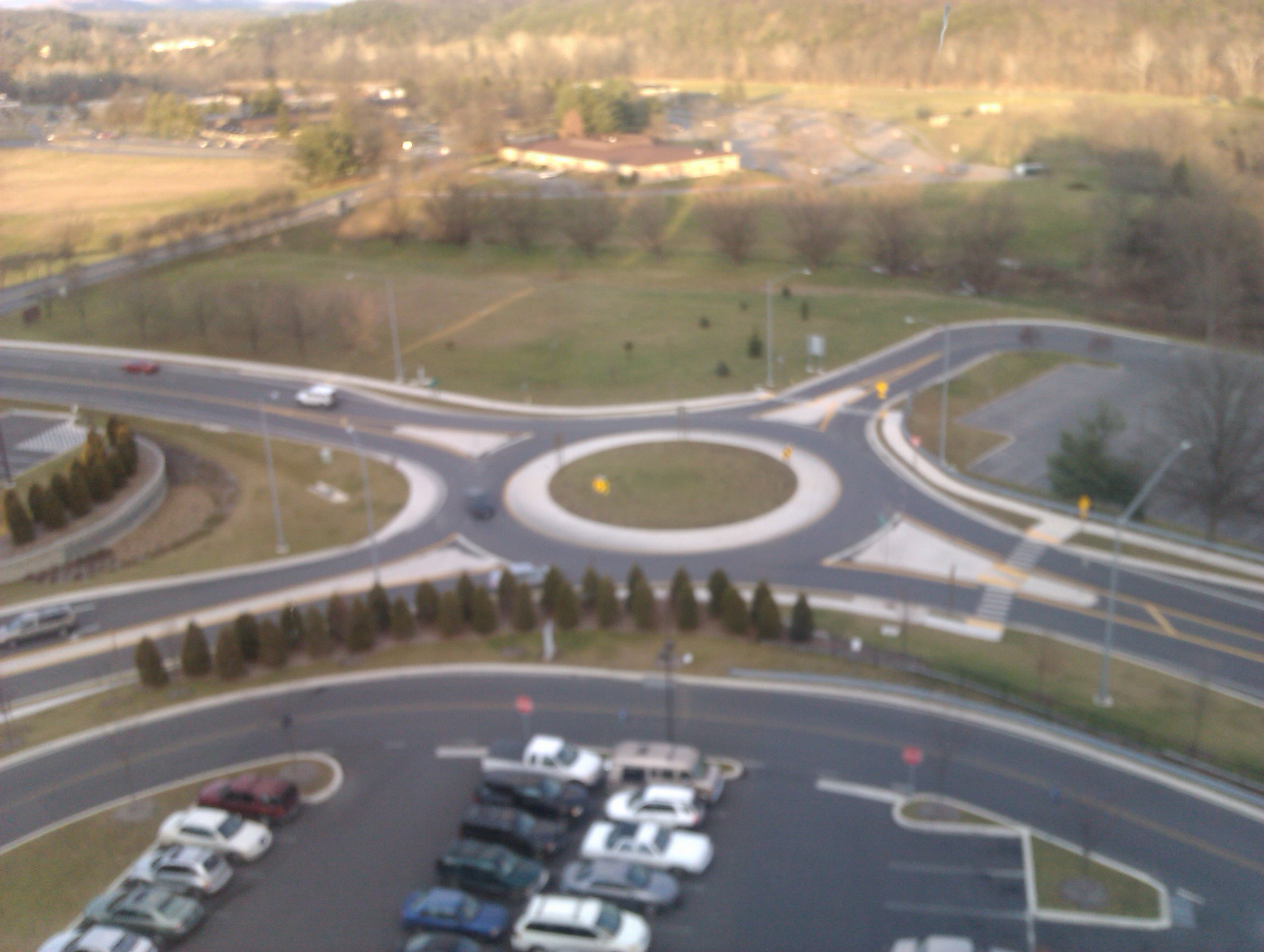
The northern roundabout at the UPMC Western Maryland hospital, photographed from the seventh floor of the hospital.

The entire route is in Allegany County.

Location	mi	km	Destinations	Notes
Evitts Creek	0.00	0.00	MD 51 (Oldtown Road) – Cumberland, Oldtown	Southern terminus
Evitts Creek	0.76	1.22	Williams Road east	Former MD 52; MD 639 turns west on Williams Road
Evitts Creek	1.34	2.16	Williams Road west – Cumberland	Former MD 52; MD 639 turns north on Willowbrook Road
Cumberland	1.56	2.51	Entrance to UPMC Western Maryland hospital	Roundabout
Cumberland	1.78	2.86	Entrance to Allegany College of Maryland	Unsigned MD 639A
Cumberland	2.23	3.59	Country Club Road	Unsigned MD 639B
Cumberland	2.79	4.49	I-68 / US 40 / US 220 (National Freeway) / US 40 Alt. west (Baltimore Avenue) – Cumberland, Frostburg, Hagerstown	Northern terminus; eastern terminus of US 40 Alternate; I-68 Exit 44
1.000 mi = 1.609 km; 1.000 km = 0.621 mi

== Auxiliary routes ==
- MD 639A is the designation for the 0.26-mile (0.42 km) access road from MD 639 to Allegany College of Maryland, a road that intersects itself twice.
- MD 639B is the designation for the 0.06-mile (0.097 km) section of Country Club Road between MD 639 and Old Willowbrook Road.
