= Catoctin Creek (Maryland) =

Stream in Frederick County, Maryland, US

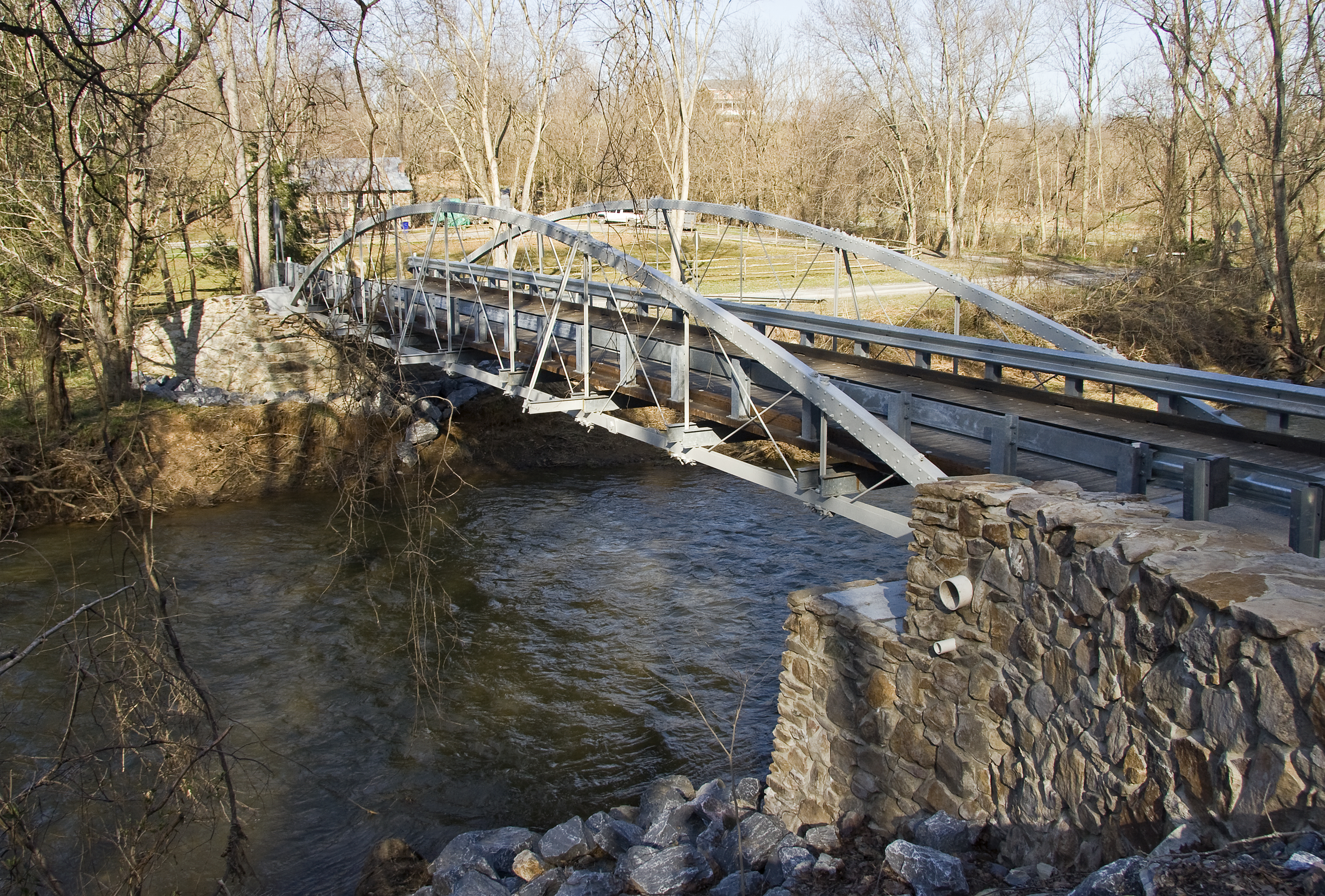

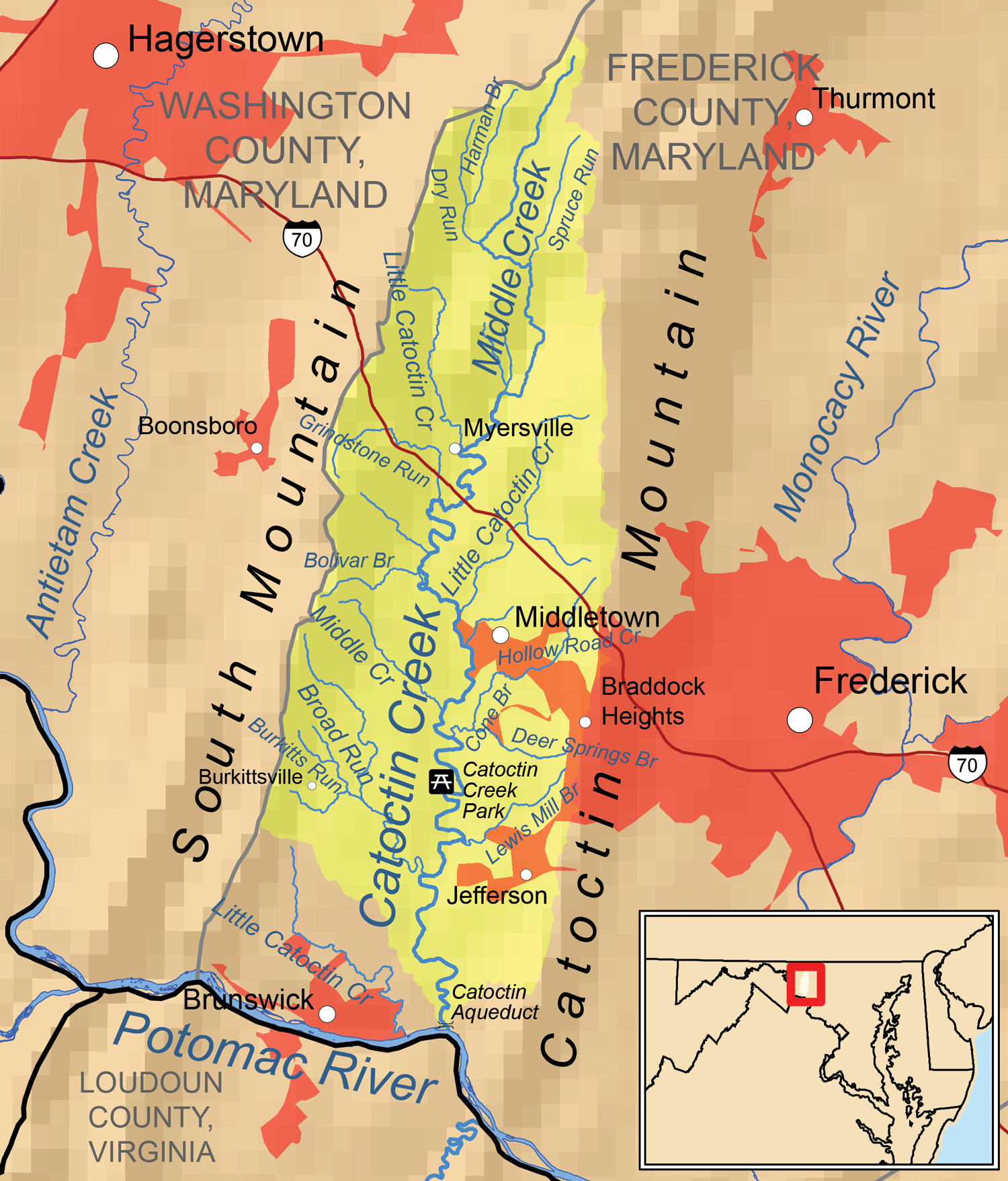
- Etymology: Catoctin Mountain

Location
- Country: United States
- State: Maryland
- Region: Frederick County

Physical characteristics
- Source: Ellerton, Maryland
  - location: 39.55113°N 77.55205°W
- Mouth: Potomac River
  - location: Lander, Maryland
  - coordinates: 39.2756576°N 77.5510994°W
  - elevation: 217 ft (66 m)
- Length: 27.9 mi (44.9 km)
- Basin size: 120.53 mi^{2} (312.2 km^{2})
- Discharge
  - location: Lander, Maryland
  - average: 145.01 cfs

Basin features
- River system: Potomac River
- Cities: Myersville, Middletown, Frederick, Jefferson
- Tributaries
  - left: Little Catoctin Creek, Lewis Mill Branch
  - right: Little Catoctin Creek, Broad Run

Catoctin Creek is a 27.9-mile-long (44.9 km) tributary of the Potomac River in Frederick County, Maryland, US. Its source is formed north of Myersville. In Myersville, it merges with the Little Catoctin Creek at Doub's Meadow Park. From there, it flows directly south through Middletown, and the southern Middletown Valley for the entire length of the stream collecting several smaller tributaries. It makes a crossing with the Chesapeake and Ohio Canal at the Catoctin Aqueduct, one of just 11 of these structures to survive. Catoctin Creek enters the Potomac River east of Brunswick.

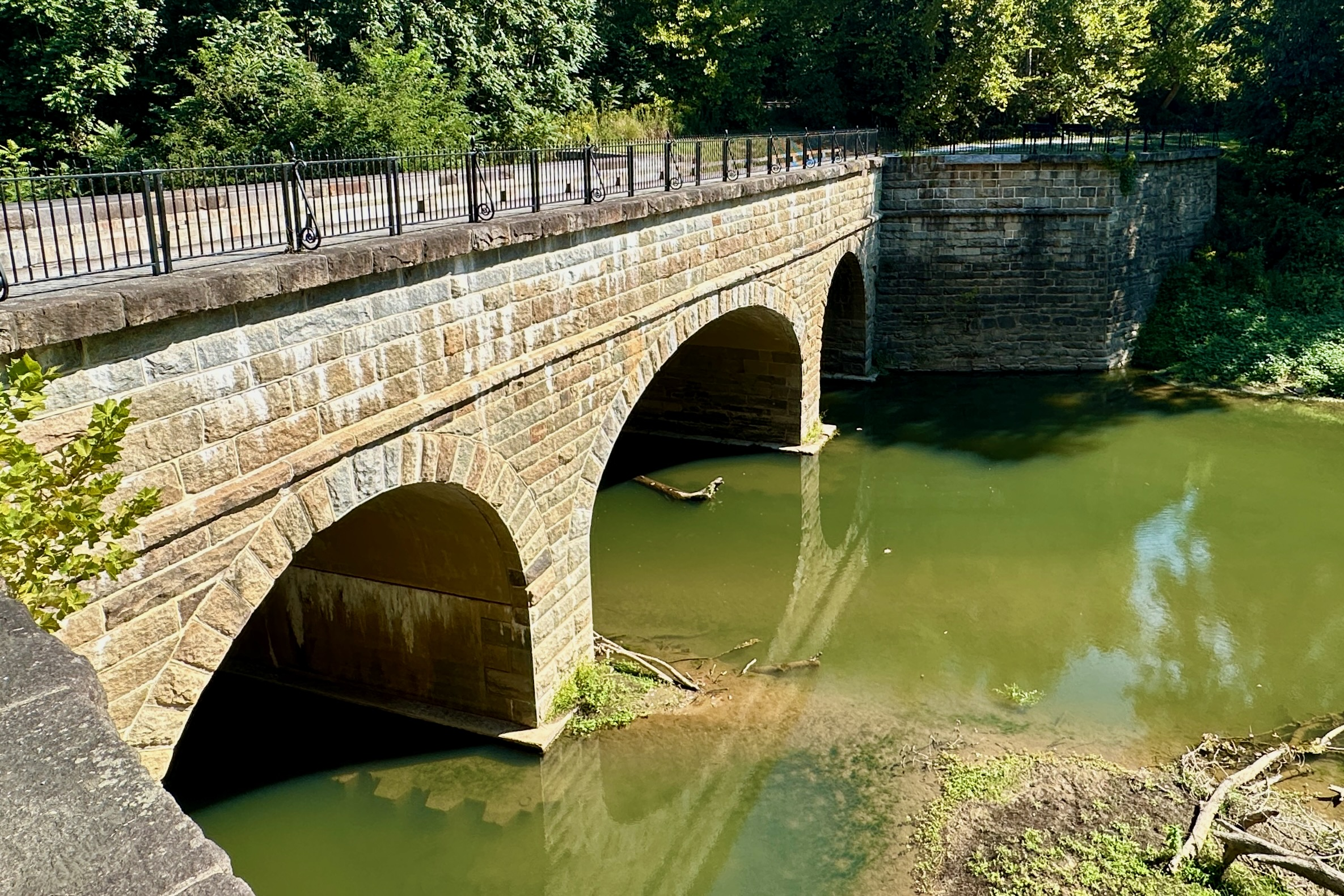
Catoctin Aqueduct

== See also ==
- List of rivers of Maryland
