= Maryland Route 51 =

State highway in Allegany County, Maryland, US

Maryland Route 51
- Maryland Route 51 highlighted in red

Route information
- Maintained by MDSHA
- Length: 25.53 mi (41.09 km)
- Existed: 1927–present
- Tourist routes: Chesapeake and Ohio Canal Scenic Byway

Major junctions
- North end: I-68 / US 40 / US 220 in Cumberland
- MD 61 / Canal Parkway in Cumberland; MD 639 in Evitts Creek
- South end: WV 9 near Paw Paw, WV

Location
- Country: United States
- State: Maryland
- Counties: Allegany

Highway system
- Maryland highway system; Interstate; US; State; Scenic Byways
← US 50	→ MD 53

Maryland Route 51 (MD 51) is a state highway in the U.S. state of Maryland. Known for most of its length as Oldtown Road, the state highway runs 25.53 miles (41.09 km) from an interchange with Interstate 68 (I-68) in Cumberland south to the West Virginia state line at the Potomac River, where the highway continues east as West Virginia Route 9 (WV 9) toward Paw Paw. Around Cumberland, MD 51 is a major highway that provides a bypass of the South End neighborhood of that city and access to industrial areas along the North Branch Potomac River. South of North Branch, MD 51 is a rural highway connecting small communities along the river in southeastern Allegany County, including Oldtown. Documentation from the Maryland State Highway Administration depict the highway as following an east-west alignment, but all signage indicates a north-south road.

The city streets of Cumberland on which MD 51 was later designated were paved by 1910. The highway was constructed from the city limits of Cumberland to North Branch in the mid-1920s and to Paw Paw in the early 1930s and dedicated as Uhl Highway. Industrial Boulevard, a divided highway in the city of Cumberland, was constructed in the mid-1960s. MD 51 between Evitts Creek and North Branch was relocated in the mid-1980s to better serve nearby industrial properties.

== Route description ==
MD 51 begins at an intersection with ramps of I-68 Exit 43B. Mechanic Street heads north from the intersection toward the Downtown Cumberland Historic District, providing access to the western end of the Chesapeake and Ohio Canal National Historical Park (C&O Canal) at Canal Place. A ramp to eastbound I-68 forms the east leg of the intersection, while Howard Street, which receives a ramp from westbound I-68, is the west leg. MD 51 heads south as Industrial Boulevard, a two-lane divided highway. Just south of its terminus, the state highway intersects Winston Street and Queen City Drive and receives a ramp from eastbound I-68. Queen City Drive is used by MD 51 north to access Centre Street, which has a ramp to westbound I-68. South of I-68 and Queen City Drive, MD 51 becomes a six-lane divided highway for a very short distance before Canal Parkway, which is unsigned MD 61, exits southbound and enters northbound just ahead of a bridge over CSX's Cumberland Terminal Subdivision railroad line.

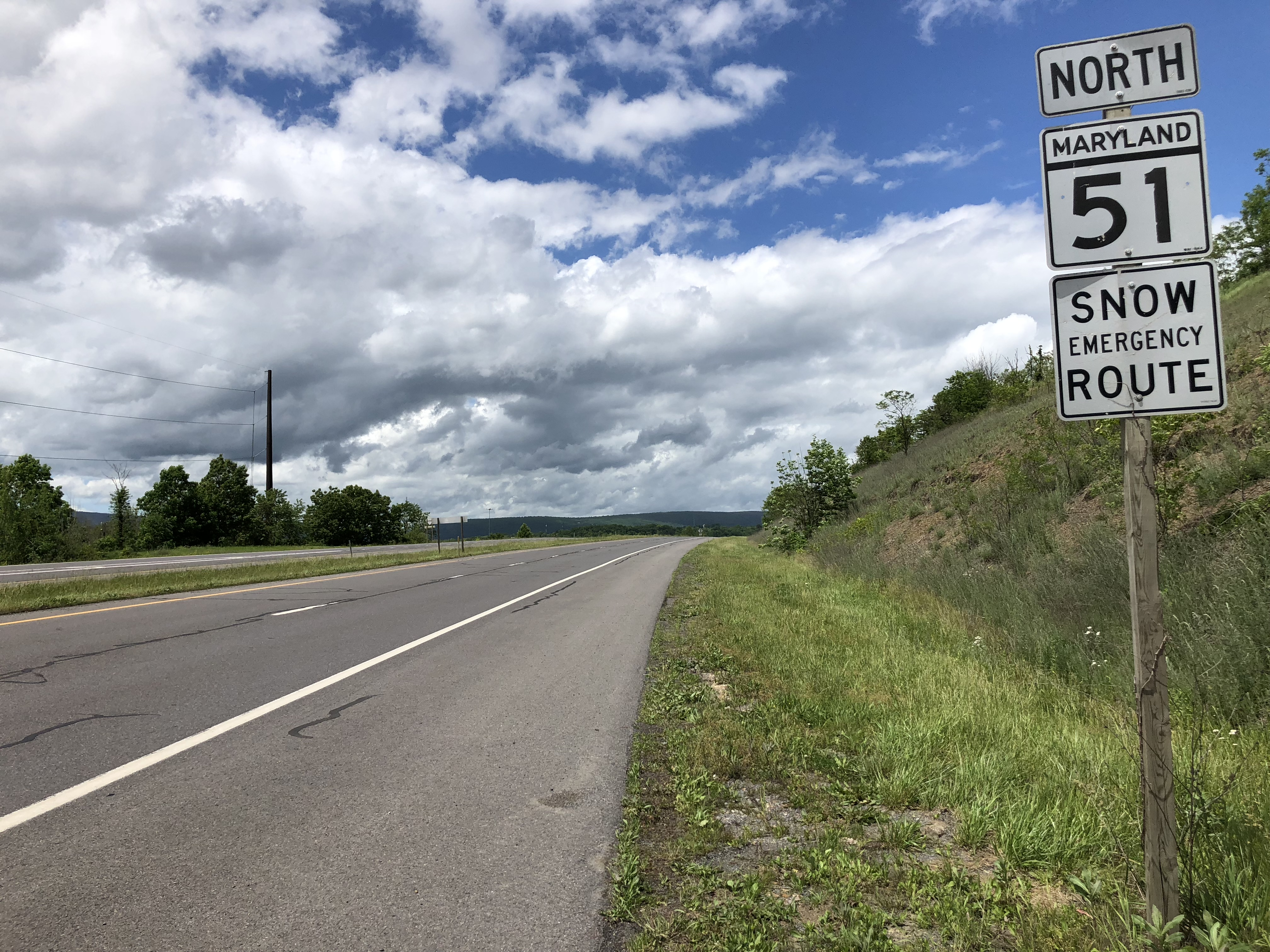
View north along MD 51 just south of the Cumberland city limits

MD 51 continues south on the west side of the South End neighborhood of Cumberland as a four-lane divided highway. The state highway turns to a more eastward direction and gains a wide median with houses and businesses just before intersecting Virginia Avenue. Southbound Virginia Avenue completes the missing movements from the partial interchange with Canal Parkway, while northbound Virginia Avenue heads through the Chapel Hill Historic District. After the median narrows, MD 51 parallels CSX's Cumberland rail yard. MD 51's name changes to Oldtown Road after intersecting the old alignment with the same name that passes through the South End of Cumberland. Shortly after leaving the city limits of Cumberland, MD 51 crosses Evitts Creek and intersects Messick Road, which is unsigned MD 639, then turns south through the unincorporated community of Evitts Creek, continuing to parallel the rail yard. The state highway reduces to a two-lane undivided road after passing Uhl Highway, an old alignment of MD 51 that is unsigned MD 51E. The rail yard ends at Mexico Farms Road, which provides access to Mexico Farms Airport and the Warrior Run Generating Station. Within the hamlet of North Branch, MD 51 intersects as other end of Uhl Highway as well as Pittsburgh Plate Glass Road, which serves the North Branch Industrial Complex, including Federal Correctional Institution, Cumberland.

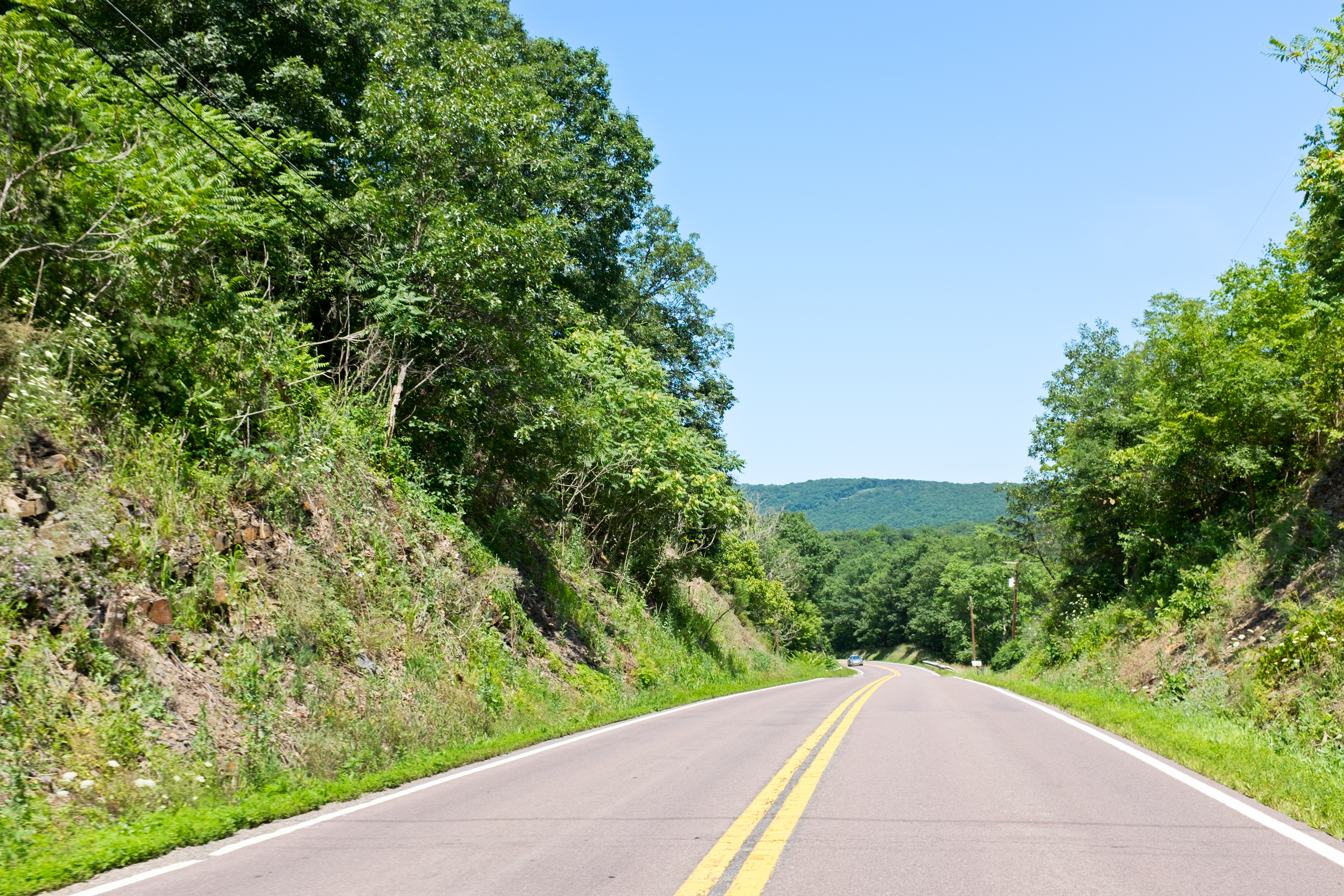
MD 51 looking southbound near Oldtown

MD 51 enters a rural area and parallels the C&O Canal southeast through Spring Gap. The state highway turns away from the North Branch Potomac River and passes through a hilly area south of Warrior Mountain before entering the valley of Mill Run. MD 51 again parallels the C&O Canal as the highway approaches the unincorporated community of Oldtown. Within Oldtown, the state highway intersects Opessa Street, which leads to a private, low-water toll bridge across the North Branch Potomac River to CR 1 (Green Spring Road) in Hampshire County, West Virginia. MD 51 separates from the C&O Canal again as it leaves Oldtown and enters the valley of Sawpit Run, which the road follows to its confluence with Town Creek. The state highway follows the creek to the community of Town Creek, where it makes contact with the C&O Canal again. MD 51 then climbs a bluff and turns north again, passing through a swath of Green Ridge State Forest before turning east and settling into the valley of Pursiane Run. The state highway turns north out of the stream valley as it loops east over the C&O Canal and south over the Potomac River into West Virginia, where the highway continues as WV 9 toward Paw Paw.

MD 51 is a part of the National Highway System as a principal arterial from I-68 in Cumberland to Uhl Highway and Pittsburgh Plate Glass Road at North Branch.

== History ==
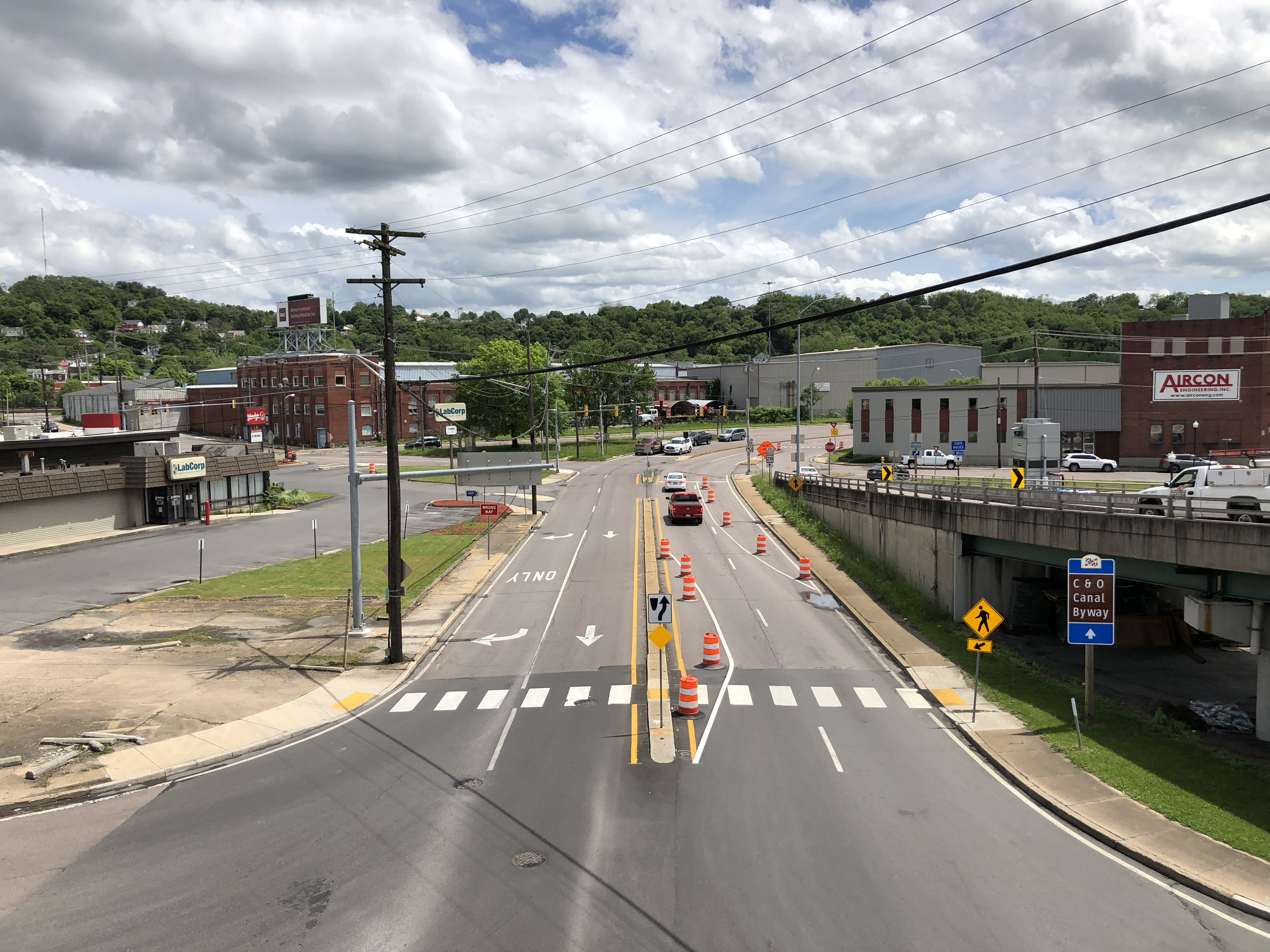
View south along MD 51 from I-68/US 40/US 220 in Cumberland

Portions of what was to become MD 51 were paved within the city of Cumberland by 1910. The state highway originally began at the intersection of Baltimore Avenue and Front Street. MD 51 followed Park Street, Williams Street, and Louisiana Avenue to Oldtown Road southeast out of the city. The modern state highway was constructed from the Cumberland city line to North Branch by 1923. MD 51 was extended to Spring Gap between 1924 and 1926, including an underpass of the Western Maryland Railway at North Branch. Construction was underway between Spring Gap and Oldtown by 1930. MD 51 was completed and marked between Spring Gap and Paw Paw, including the new bridge over the Potomac River near Paw Paw, in 1932. In 1934, the highway was named for G. Clinton Uhl, a native of Mount Savage who was chairman of the Maryland State Roads Commission from 1929 until his death in 1934.

MD 51 was widened between the city limits of Cumberland and North Branch in 1949 and 1950. A new bridge was constructed over Evitts Creek and the surrounding length of highway widened to three lanes in 1957. Industrial Boulevard was constructed from the Cumberland city limit north to the intersection of Mechanic Street and Centre Street in 1964. At the time, the new bypass of the South End of Cumberland was constructed as a divided highway from Oldtown Road to just south of Messick Road. The divided highway was extended to downtown Cumberland after a new bridge over the Baltimore and Ohio Railroad was completed in 1965. The divided highway was extended south to its present extent just south of the northern intersection with Uhl Highway in Evitts Creek, part of the relocation of MD 51 through North Branch, in 1987. The present bridge over the Potomac River at Paw Paw was also constructed in 1987.

== Junction list ==
The entire route is in Allegany County.

Location	mi	km	Destinations	Notes
Cumberland	0.00	0.00	I-68 east / US 40 east / US 220 north (National Freeway) / Mechanic Street north – Hancock	Northern terminus; I-68 Exit 43B
Cumberland	0.08	0.13	Queen City Drive north / Centre Street north to I-68 west / US 40 west / US 220 south (National Freeway) – Frostburg	Northbound exit, southbound entrance; unsigned MD 51A
Cumberland	0.21	0.34	Canal Parkway (MD 61 south) / South Wineow Street – Cumberland Regional Airport	Southbound exit, northbound entrance; northern terminus of MD 61
Evitts Creek	2.86	4.60	MD 639 north (Messick Road) – Allegany College of Maryland	Southern terminus of MD 639
Oldtown	14.72	23.69	Bear Hill Road north / Opessa Street west to CR 1 south (Green Spring Road) – Oldtown	
	25.53	41.09	WV 9 east (Henry W. Miller Highway) – Paw Paw	West Virginia state line at Potomac River; southern terminus
1.000 mi = 1.609 km; 1.000 km = 0.621 mi: Incomplete access

== Auxiliary routes ==
MD 51 currently has four unsigned auxiliary routes.

- MD 51A is the designation for a 0.04-mile (0.064 km) section of Centre Street that serves as a ramp from westbound MD 51 to northbound Queen City Drive and Winston Street.
- MD 51D is the designation for Evitts Creek Drive, a 0.18-mile (0.29 km) service road that closely parallels the eastbound side of MD 51 from its terminus at the MD 51–MD 639 intersection south to a cul-de-sac in the hamlet of Evitts Creek.
- MD 51E is the designation for Uhl Highway, a 2.24-mile (3.60 km) section of old alignment that runs from MD 51 a short distance south of MD 639 south to MD 51's intersection with Pittsburgh Plate Glass Road in North Branch.
- MD 51F is the designation for a 0.10-mile (0.16 km) section of Blue Valley Road east from MD 51 in North Branch.

MD 51 also had at least two former auxiliary routes.

- MD 51B was the designation for 0.03-mile (0.048 km) section of Messick Road north from Messick Road's intersection with MD 51. MD 51B became part of MD 639 in 2008.
- MD 51C was the designation for Starlite Drive, a 0.27-mile (0.43 km) section of old alignment of MD 51 from Messick Road east to a private road. MD 51C was transferred to county maintenance in 2008.
