= Peter of P. Grossnickel Farm =

Historic house in Maryland, United States

- U.S. National Register of Historic Places
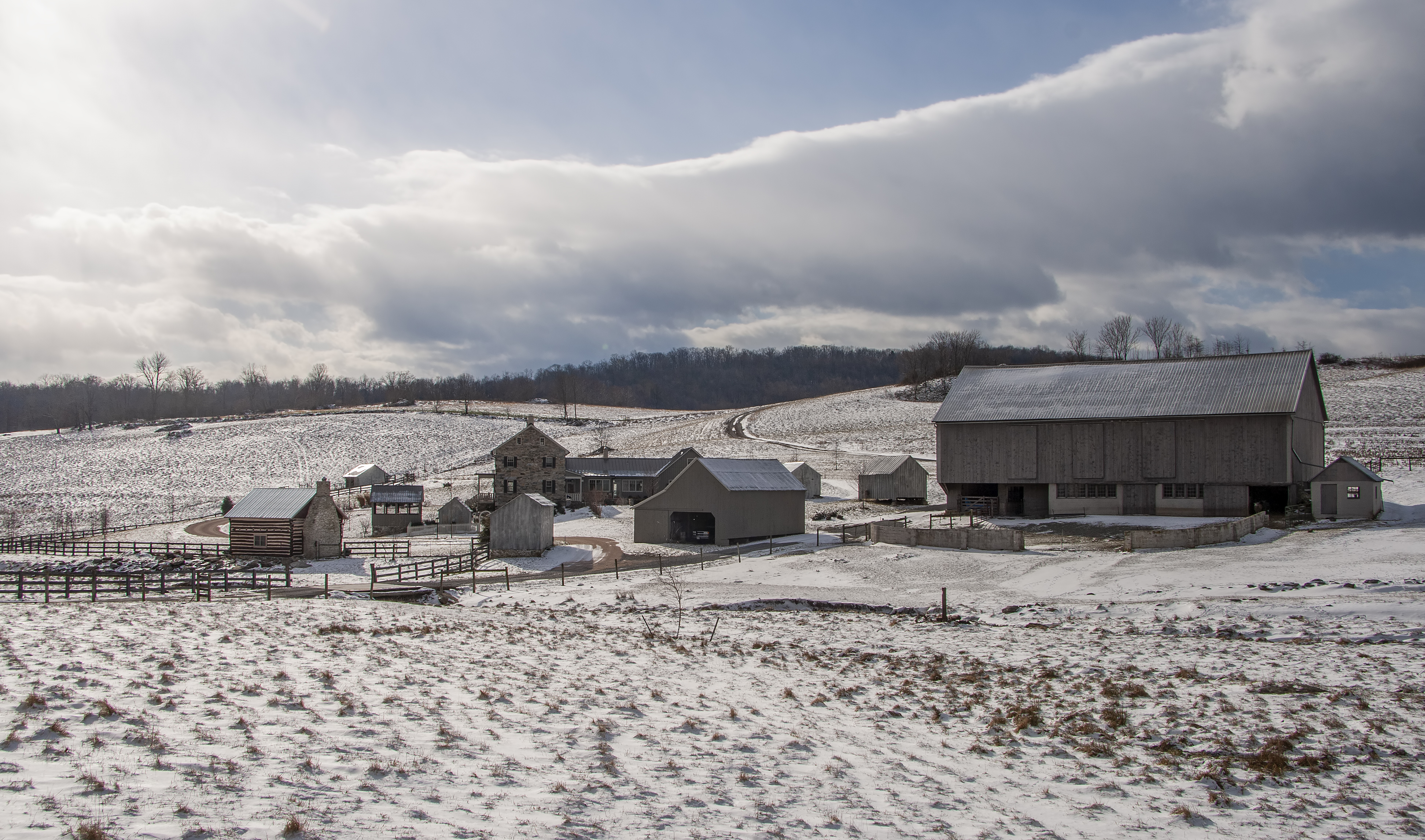
- Grossnickel farm in winter 2012

- Location within Maryland Location within the United States
- Location: 11720 Wolfsville Rd., Myersville, Maryland
- Coordinates: 39°33′25″N 77°31′38″W
- Area: 32 acres (13 ha)
- Built: 1840
- Architectural style: Greek Revival
- NRHP reference No.: 98000944
- Added to NRHP: July 31, 1998

Peter of P. Grossnickel Farm is a historic home and farm complex located at Myersville, Maryland, Frederick County. It consists of a mid-19th-century, Greek Revival farmhouse and 13 related buildings and structures. The house is a 2 1/2-story stone center-passage house on a limestone foundation, with a 1 1/2-story kitchen wing and 18-inch-thick (460 mm) walls. The house was built between 1840 and 1850. Also on the property is an 1881 tenant house with corresponding barn, spring house, and washhouse / privy; an 1884–1897 bank barn; a pre-1830 granary; a 19th-century wood shed; late-19th-century hog pen / chicken house; a pre-1830 beehive oven; a late-19th-century smokehouse; a spring house with a Late Victorian cottage addition; and early-20th-century concrete block milk house; and a log summer kitchen of unknown date. The Grossnickel family was a German American family who were instrumental in the establishment of the Grossnickel Church of the Brethren.

It was listed on the National Register of Historic Places in 1998.
