= Spring Gap, Maryland =

- Census-designated place
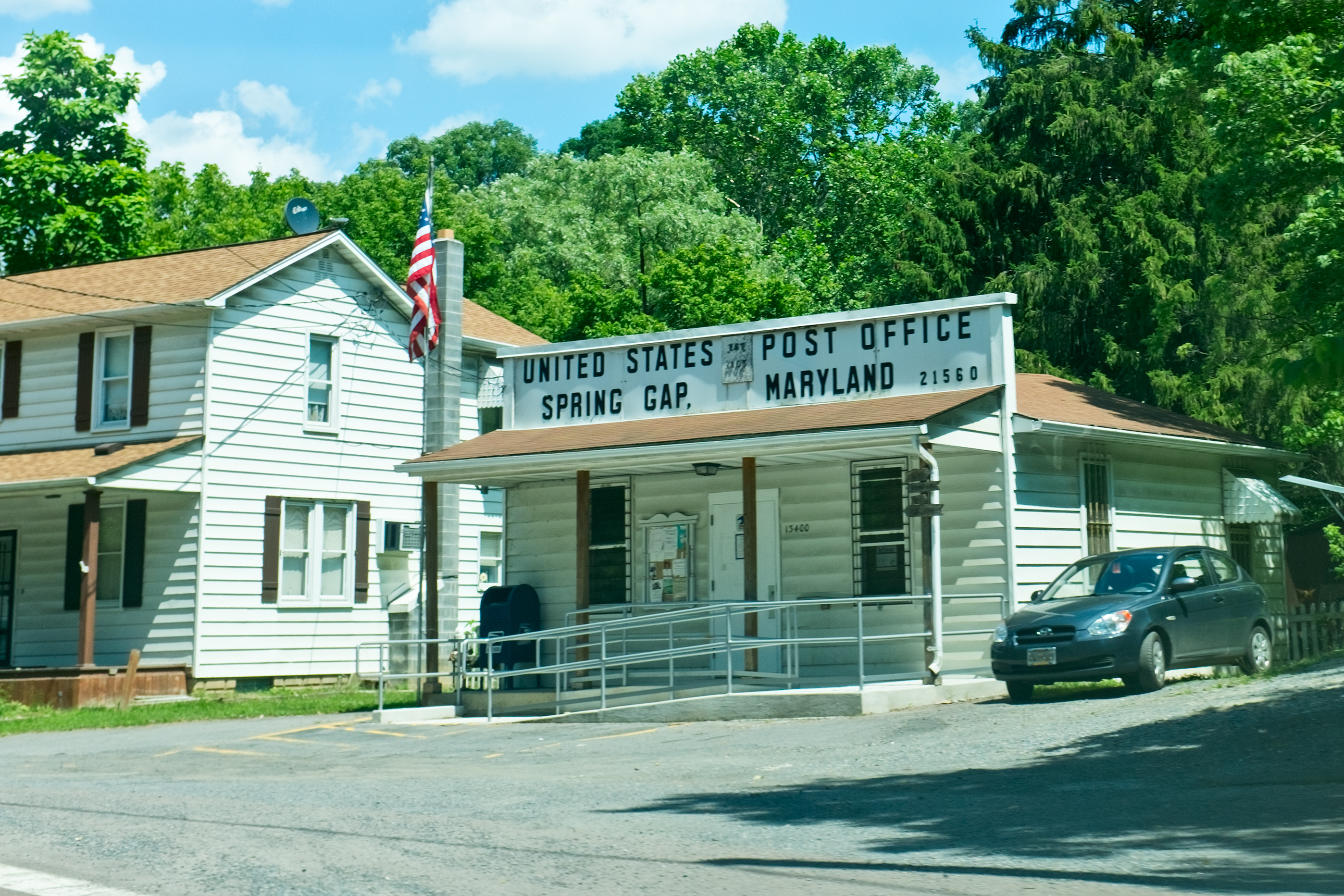
- Spring Gap Post Office

- Location within the State of Maryland Spring; Gap (the United States)
- Coordinates: 39°33′55″N 78°42′19″W
- Country: United States
- State: Maryland
- County: Allegany

Area
  - Total: 0.65 sq mi (1.68 km^{2})
  - Land: 0.65 sq mi (1.68 km^{2})
  - Water: 0 sq mi (0.00 km^{2})
- Elevation: 696 ft (212 m)

Population (2020)
  - Total: 52
  - Density: 80.4/sq mi (31.04/km^{2})
- Time zone: UTC−5 (Eastern (EST))
  - Summer (DST): UTC−4 (EDT)
- ZIP code: 21560
- FIPS code: 24-74350
- GNIS feature ID: 2583690

Spring Gap is an unincorporated community and census-designated place (CDP) in Allegany County, Maryland, United States. As of the 2010 census it had a population of 55.

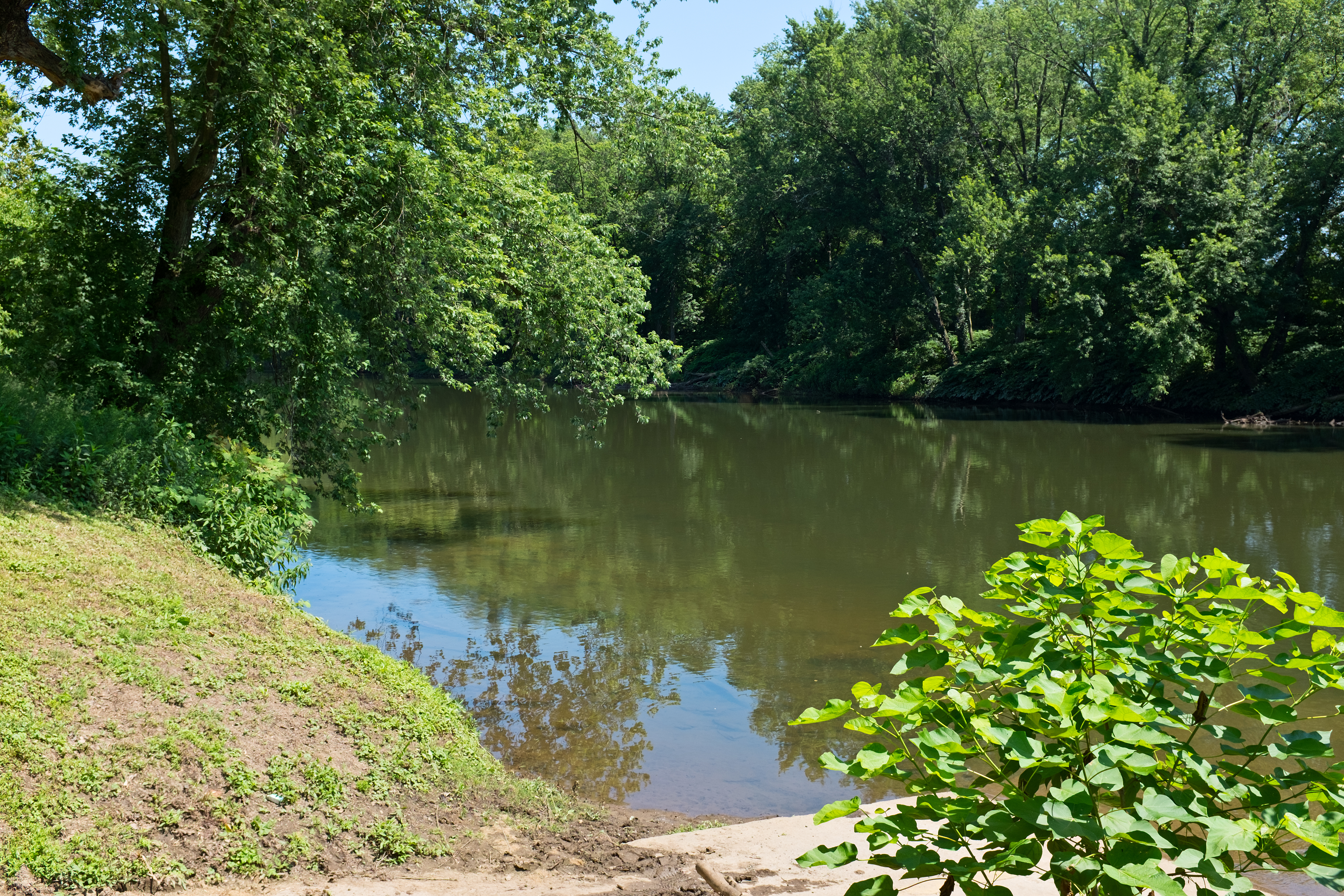
Potomac River at the Spring Gap recreational area

Spring Gap is located in the valley of the North Branch Potomac River along the Chesapeake and Ohio (C&O) Canal at mile marker 173. Just west of the community is the National Park Service Spring Gap Recreation Area, which offers camping sites and a place to relax for hikers and bikers of the C&O towpath. The park is easy to access by car and provides canoe access to the river. The Spring Gap Recreation Area is a popular location to pick up, drop off, or park when hiking or biking the C&O canal towpath to or from Cumberland, 11 miles (18 km) upriver.

Some of the best fishing in the Potomac River is in the section from Spring Gap to Hancock.

Maryland Route 51 runs through Spring Gap, leading northwest to Cumberland and east to Oldtown, and Paw Paw, West Virginia. The mainline CSX railroad runs up the Potomac valley across the river from Spring Gap in West Virginia.

== Demographics ==
Historical population
Census	Pop.	Note	%±
2020	52		—
U.S. Decennial Census
