= Henry Brandenburg House =

- U.S. National Register of Historic Places
- Location within Maryland Location within the United States
- Location: 9057 Myersville Road, Myersville, Maryland
- Coordinates: 39°20′56″N 77°36′14″W
- Built: ca. 1833-1860
- NRHP reference No.: 100005908
- Added to NRHP: December 11, 2020

Henry Brandenburg House, also known as Bidle Hill Farm, is a historic home and farm complex located near Myersville, Frederick County, Maryland. The house was built between about 1833 and 1848, and is a two-story vernacular brick dwelling with a hall-and-parlor plan. It is three bays wide, and has an "L"-plan, with a brick two-story rear wing. Also on the property are a contemporaneous shed with a brick bake oven, spring house and smokehouse.

It was listed on the National Register of Historic Places in 2020.
