= Husband Flint Mill Site =

- U.S. National Register of Historic Places
- Location: Forge Hill Road, Kalmia, Maryland
- Area: 31 acres (13 ha)
- Built: 1920
- NRHP reference No.: 75000902
- Added to NRHP: June 18, 1975

Husband Flint Mill Site, also known as the Husband Flint Milling Company Mill, is a historic flint mill and quarry located at Kalmia, Harford County, Maryland. It was originally built in the 19th century by Joshua Husband, then acquired by George J. Kroeger in 1909. As rebuilt by him, the mill was one of the best-equipped flint mills in the state. The mill ground vein quartz into different sizes used in the manufacture of porcelain dishes or pottery. The quarries were situated on the hill above the site; one opening runs into the hillside about 500 feet and is 40 feet deep at the face. Although the mill was dismantled in the 1920s, some remnants remain.

It was listed on the National Register of Historic Places in 1975.
