= Ivory Mills =

- U.S. National Register of Historic Places
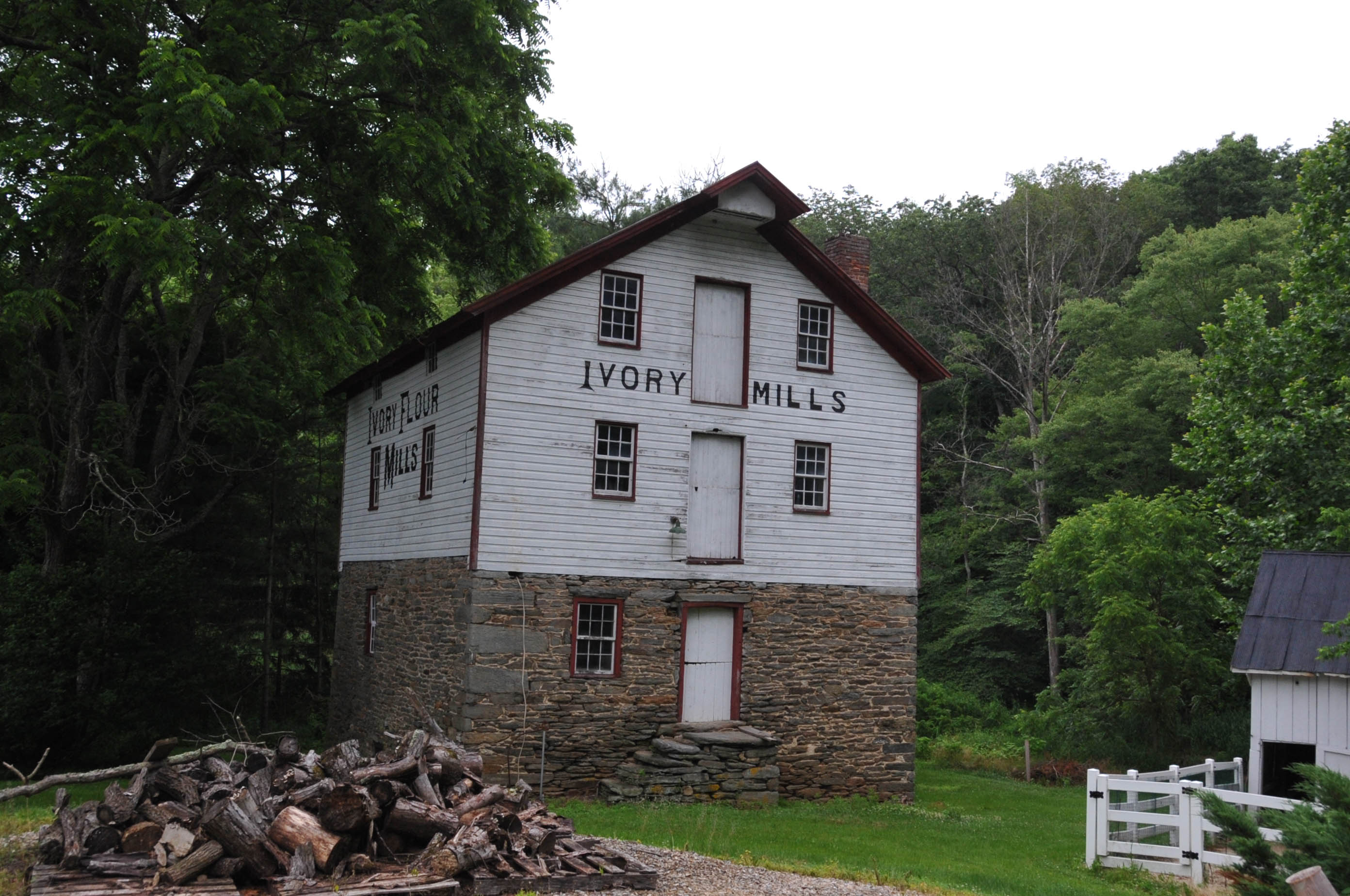
- Ivory Mills in 2007

- Location within Maryland Location within the United States
- Nearest city: White Hall, Maryland
- Coordinates: 39°40′28″N 76°32′15″W
- Area: 14 acres (5.7 ha)
- Built: 1781
- Architectural style: British Cabin/ I-house
- NRHP reference No.: 97000968
- Added to NRHP: August 29, 1997

Ivory Mills is a 14-acre (5.7 ha), historic grist mill complex located at White Hall, Harford County, Maryland, United States. It consists of six standing 19th century frame buildings and structures: mill, miller's house, barn, corn crib, carriage house, and chicken house. The property also includes the ruins of a stone spring house, and the stone abutments of a frame, Federal-era covered bridge. The focus of the complex is the three-story stone and frame mill building built circa 1818. The ground story is constructed of coursed stone rubble, and the upper stories from clapboard. The family first started a mill on this site in 1781; this particular mill ceased production in the 1920s.

Ivory Mills was listed on the National Register of Historic Places in 1997.
