= Shervettes Corner, Maryland =

Unincorporated community in Maryland, United States

- Unincorporated community
- Location within the state of Maryland Shervettes Corner (the United States)
- Coordinates: 39°23′48″N 76°53′43″W
- Country: United States
- State: Maryland
- County: Carroll
- Time zone: UTC-5 (Eastern (EST))
  - Summer (DST): UTC-4 (EDT)

Shervettes Corner is an unincorporated community in Carroll County, Maryland, United States, lying between Eldersburg and Randallstown. It is surrounded on three sides by Liberty Reservoir, south of Maryland Route 26. It is located east of the Lakeview Memorial Park Cemetery.

== Transportation ==
The Owings Mills station of the Baltimore Metro SubwayLink in nearby Owings Mills, Baltimore County, is a 15-minute drive by car from Shervettes Corner and provides subway access to downtown Baltimore.

There is no bus link between Shervettes Corner/Eldersburg and nearby Randallstown in Baltimore County, in part due to longstanding opposition to inter-county public transit from Carroll County officials and residents.
