= Kalmia, Maryland =

Unincorporated community in Maryland, U.S.

Coordinates: 39°36′19″N 76°18′15″W

Kalmia is an unincorporated community in Harford County, Maryland, United States. The Husband Flint Mill Site was listed on the National Register of Historic Places in 1975.
