= White Hall, Baltimore County, Maryland =

Unincorporated community in Maryland, United States

White Hall, Maryland
- Unincorporated community
- Location within the U.S. state of Maryland White Hall, Maryland (the United States)
- Coordinates: 39°37′18″N 76°37′43″W
- Country: United States
- State: Maryland
- County: Baltimore
- Time zone: UTC-5 (Eastern (EST))
  - Summer (DST): UTC-4 (EDT)

White Hall is an unincorporated community which straddles Baltimore and Harford counties, Maryland, United States. The town's post office is located on the NCR Trail and the Gunpowder River. Ivory Mills was listed on the National Register of Historic Places in 1997.
