= Carpenter Point, Maryland =

Unincorporated community in Maryland, United States

- Unincorporated community
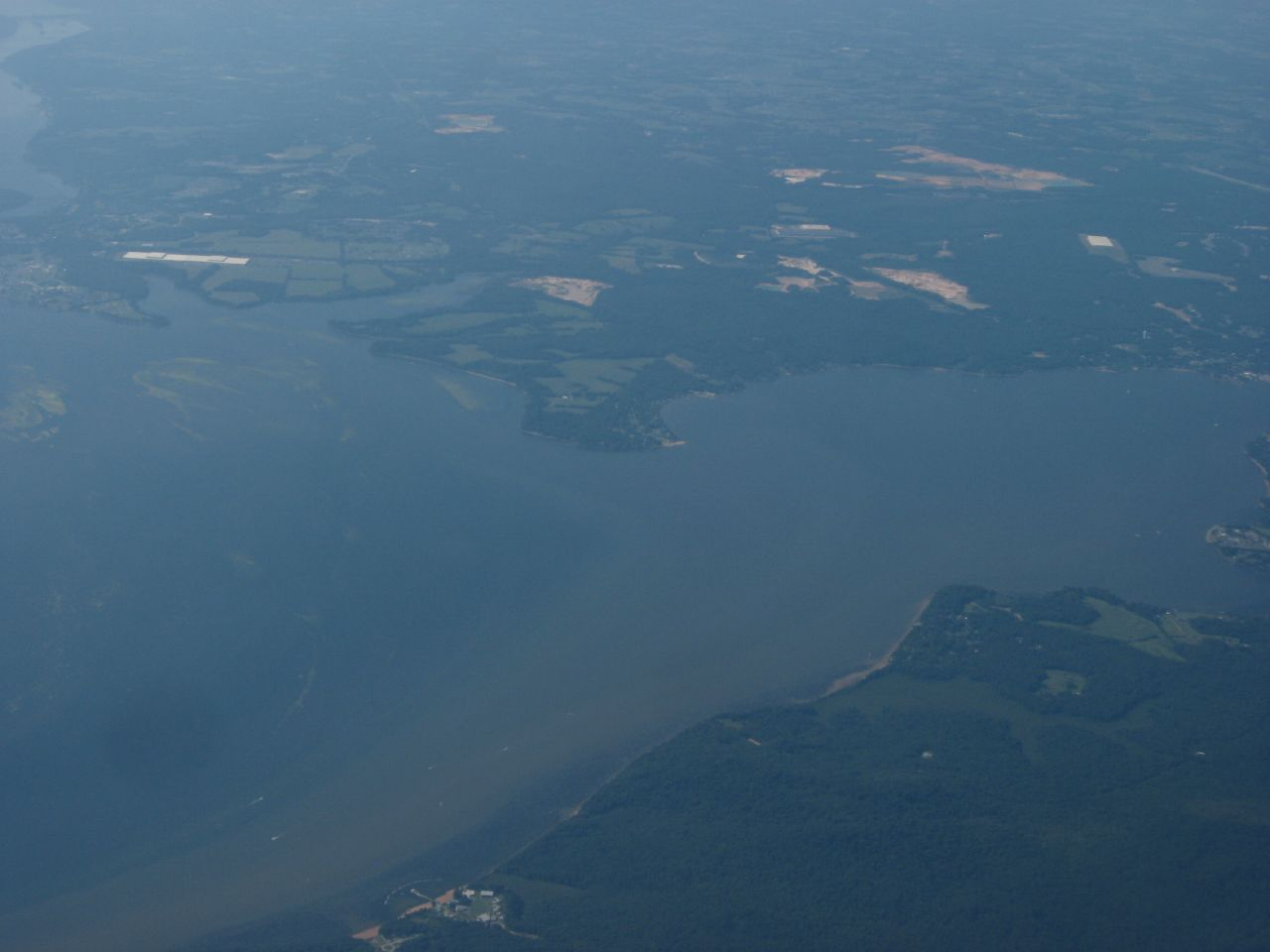
- Carpenter Point (center), where the North East River (right) flows into the Chesapeake Bay

- Location within the State of Maryland Carpenter Point (the United States)
- Coordinates: 39°32′39″N 76°00′24″W
- Country: United States
- State: Maryland
- County: Cecil
- Time zone: UTC-5 (Eastern (EST))
  - Summer (DST): UTC-4 (EDT)

Carpenter's Point is an unincorporated community in Cecil County, Maryland, United States. Carpenter Point was the site of the first permanent settlement in Cecil County, established on July 20, 1658, when William Carpenter patented 400 acres (1.6 km^{2}) of land called Anna Catherine Neck, abutting Bay Head Creek, now Principio Creek; Simon Carpenter was assigned this tract of land in 1662. On June 7, 1674, a court was held at the house of Francis Wright at Carpenter’s Point. A painting by the noted painter James Peale titled “The Ramsay-Polk Family at Carpenter’s Point, Cecil County, Maryland” shows the landing in the background in the 18th century.
