= Myersville, Maryland =

Town in the United States

- Town
- Town of Myersville
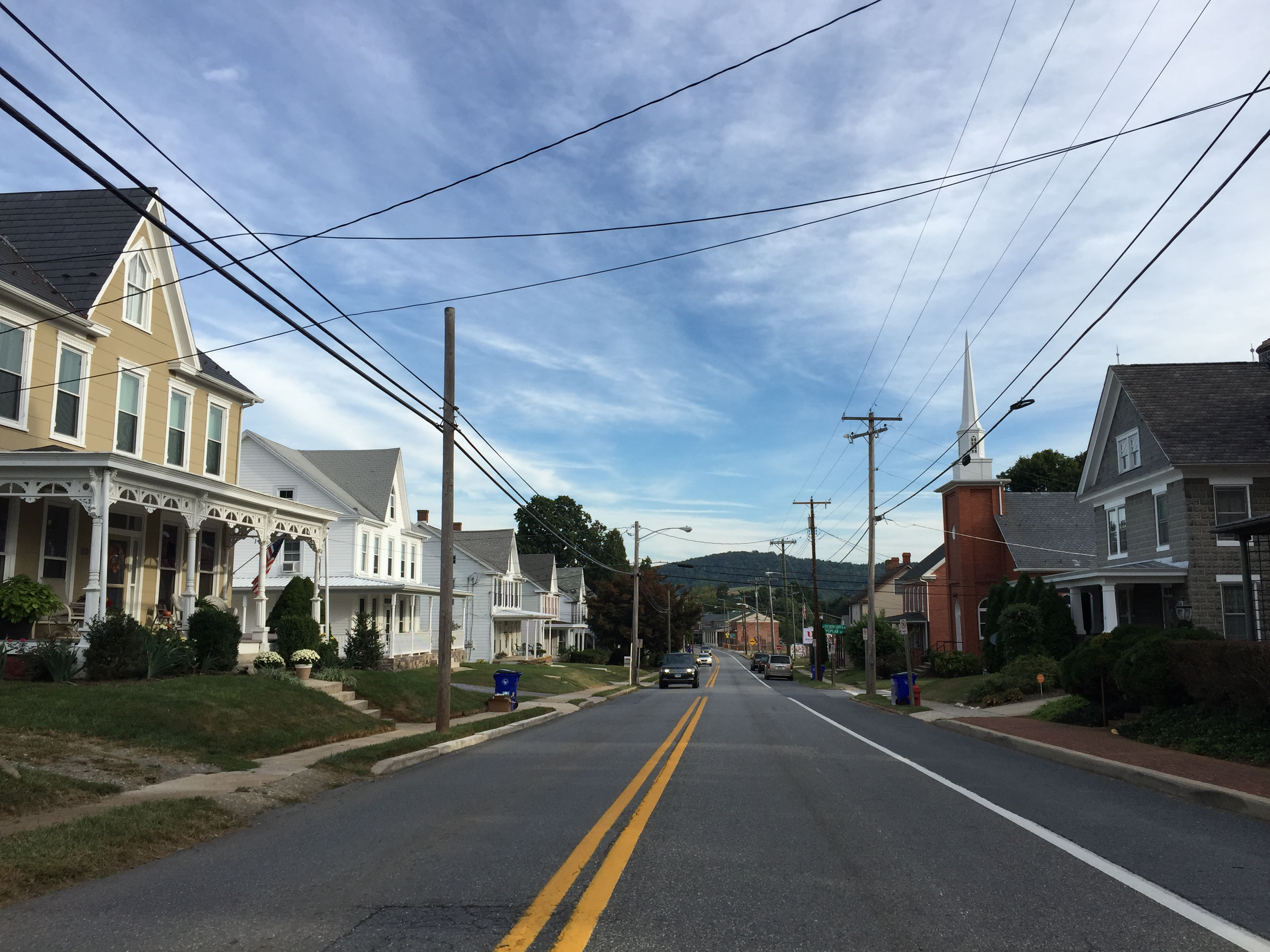
- Main Street in Myersville

- Flag Seal

- Location of Myersville, Maryland
- Coordinates: 39°30′18″N 77°34′05″W
- Country: United States of America
- State: Maryland
- County: Frederick
- Incorporated: 1904

Area
  - Total: 1.12 sq mi (2.90 km^{2})
  - Land: 1.12 sq mi (2.90 km^{2})
  - Water: 0 sq mi (0.00 km^{2})
- Elevation: 620 ft (190 m)

Population (2020)
  - Total: 1,748
  - Density: 1,559.8/sq mi (602.24/km^{2})
- Time zone: UTC-5 (Eastern (EST))
  - Summer (DST): UTC-4 (EDT)
- ZIP code: 21773
- Area codes: 301, 240
- FIPS code: 24-54875
- GNIS feature ID: 2391320
- Website: myersville.org

Myersville is a town in Frederick County, Maryland, United States. The population was 1,748 at the 2020 census.

== History ==
The town was incorporated in 1904. at this time, Myersville had a population of 150 people.

That same year, Myersville was connected to its neighboring town Hagerstown by the blue ridge trolley.

On January 4, 1919, a large fire destroyed many shops and buildings in the center of town.

In 1968, Insterstate 70 was extended through Myersville.

in 1981, the town boundaries were expanded for the first time.

The Peter of P. Grossnickel Farm and Henry Brandenburg House are listed on the National Register of Historic Places.

=== Capture of the D.C. snipers ===
In October 2002, the Washington, D.C. metropolitan area snipers John Allen Muhammad and Lee Boyd Malvo were apprehended at a rest stop along westbound I-70 in Myersville. The two were discovered when a truck driver recognized their car from police reports.

== Geography ==
According to the United States Census Bureau, the town has a total area of 1.02 square miles (2.64 km^{2}), all land. The Myersville area is the source of Catoctin Creek, which roughly flows in a "C" loop pattern (northside to eastside to southside) just outside the city limits.

== Transportation ==
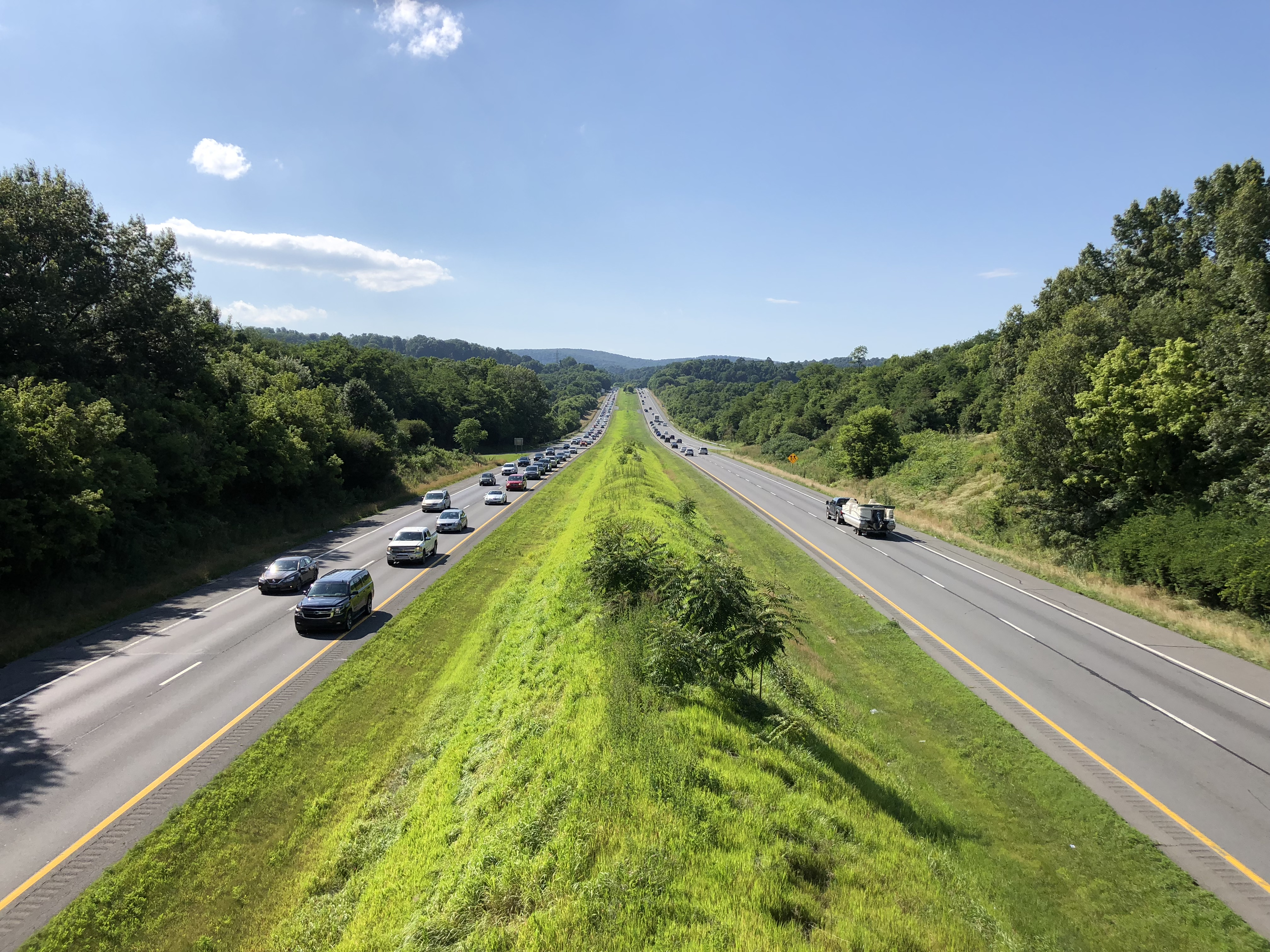
I-70 westbound in Myersville

The main method of transport to and from Myersville is by road. The main highway that serves the town is Interstate 70, which heads eastward from Myersville to Baltimore and westward to Pittsburgh. Access to Myersville is provided via an interchange with Maryland Route 17, the other highway directly serving the town, which serves western Frederick County on a north–south alignment. U.S. Route 40 passes just to the northeast of the town limits and provides an alternative to I-70 for east–west travelers.

The 505 Commuter Bus operated by the Maryland Transit Administration, serves Myersville.

== Demographics ==
Historical population
Census	Pop.	Note	%±
1870	139		—
1880	138		−0.7%
1910	240		—
1920	239		−0.4%
1930	262		9.6%
1940	310		18.3%
1950	250		−19.4%
1960	355		42.0%
1970	450		26.8%
1980	432		−4.0%
1990	464		7.4%
2000	1,382		197.8%
2010	1,626		17.7%
2020	1,748		7.5%
U.S. Decennial Census

=== 2020 census ===
As of the 2020 census, Myersville had a population of 1,748. The median age was 37.5 years. 28.3% of residents were under the age of 18 and 10.5% of residents were 65 years of age or older. For every 100 females there were 95.3 males, and for every 100 females age 18 and over there were 95.8 males age 18 and over. The employment rate was 71.4%.

0.0% of residents lived in urban areas, while 100.0% lived in rural areas.

There were 579 households in Myersville, of which 46.6% had children under the age of 18 living in them. Of all households, 69.8% were married-couple households, 8.8% were households with a male householder and no spouse or partner present, and 15.9% were households with a female householder and no spouse or partner present. About 12.1% of all households were made up of individuals and 5.5% had someone living alone who was 65 years of age or older.

There were 590 housing units, of which 1.9% were vacant. The homeowner vacancy rate was 0.4% and the rental vacancy rate was 8.0%.

Racial composition as of the 2020 census
Race	Number	Percent
White	1,486	85.0%
Black or African American	61	3.5%
American Indian and Alaska Native	5	0.3%
Asian	29	1.7%
Native Hawaiian and Other Pacific Islander	0	0.0%
Some other race	29	1.7%
Two or more races	138	7.9%
Hispanic or Latino (of any race)	103	5.9%

=== 2010 census ===
As of the census of 2010, there were 1,626 people, 531 households, and 437 families living in the town. The population density was 1,594.1 inhabitants per square mile (615.5/km^{2}). There were 553 housing units at an average density of 542.2 per square mile (209.3/km^{2}). The racial makeup of the town was 95.1% White, 2.2% African American, 0.2% Native American, 1.3% Asian, 0.2% from other races, and 1.0% from two or more races. Hispanic or Latino of any race were 3.5% of the population.

There were 531 households, of which 49.5% had children under the age of 18 living with them, 70.8% were married couples living together, 8.7% had a female householder with no husband present, 2.8% had a male householder with no wife present, and 17.7% were non-families. 13.2% of all households were made up of individuals, and 6.7% had someone living alone who was 65 years of age or older. The average household size was 3.06 and the average family size was 3.41.

The median age in the town was 38.1 years. 30.8% of residents were under the age of 18; 8.5% were between the ages of 18 and 24; 23.7% were from 25 to 44; 30.1% were from 45 to 64; and 6.9% were 65 years of age or older. The gender makeup of the town was 50.2% male and 49.8% female.

=== 2000 census ===
At the 2000 census, there were 1,382 people, 439 households, and 378 families living in the town. The population density was 1,704.9 inhabitants per square mile (658.3/km^{2}). There were 450 housing units at an average density of 555.2 per square mile (214.4/km^{2}). The racial makeup of the town was 98.48% White, 0.65% African American, 0.07% Native American, 0.29% Asian, 0.43% from other races, and 0.07% from two or more races. Hispanic or Latino of any race were 0.94% of the population.

There were 439 households, of which 57.9% had children under the age of 18 living with them, 76.1% were married couples living together, 9.1% had a female householder with no husband present, and 13.7% were non-families. 11.2% of all households were made up of individuals, and 4.3% had someone living alone who was 65 years of age or older. The average household size was 3.15 and the average family size was 3.44.

The age distribution was 38.7% under the age of 18, 3.0% from 18 to 24, 35.2% from 25 to 44, 16.3% from 45 to 64, and 6.8% who were 65 years of age or older. The median age was 33 years. For every 100 females, there were 100.9 males. For every 100 females age 18 and over, there were 92.9 males.

The median household income was $72,639, and the median family income was $75,768. Males had a median income of $53,125, and females had a median income of $38,295. The per capita income for the town was $24,207. About 0.5% of families and 0.7% of the population were below the poverty line. No one under the age of 18 was below the poverty line, and 3.8% of those age 65 or over were below the poverty line.

== Education ==
It is in Frederick County Public Schools.

School zoning is as follows: Myersville Elementary School, Middletown Middle School, and Middletown High School.
