= Lander, Maryland =

Unincorporated community in Maryland, United States

- Unincorporated community
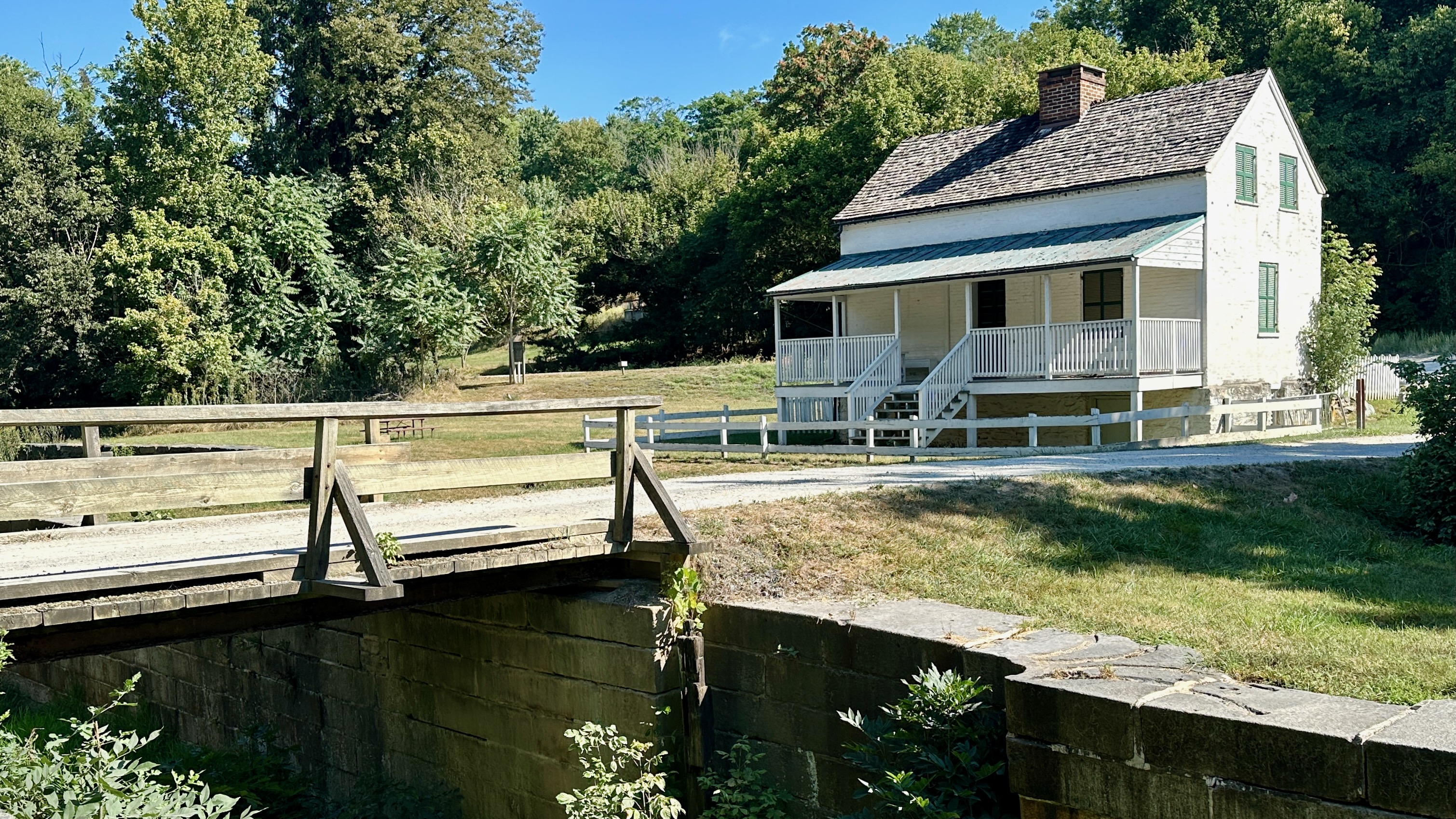
- C&O Canal Lockhouse and Lock 29 in Lander

- Location in Maryland Lander (the United States)
- Coordinates: 39°18′32″N 77°33′33″W
- Country: United States of America
- State: Maryland
- County: Frederick
- Elevation: 299 ft (91 m)
- GNIS feature ID: 588686

Lander is an unincorporated community in Frederick County, Maryland, United States. Lock 29 on the C&O Canal is located in Lander.
