= Evitts Creek, Maryland =

Unincorporated community in Maryland, United States

- Unincorporated community
- Location within the State of Maryland Evitts Creek, Maryland (the United States)
- Coordinates: 39°37′30″N 78°44′04″W
- Country: United States
- State: Maryland
- County: Allegany
- Elevation: 656 ft (200 m)
- Time zone: UTC-5 (Eastern (EST))
  - Summer (DST): UTC-4 (EDT)
- GNIS feature ID: 590174

Evitts Creek is an unincorporated community located on the eastern outskirts of Cumberland, Maryland, United States. The community is on Maryland Route 51 (West Industrial Boulevard) east of the confluence of Evitts Creek and the North Branch Potomac River.
