= Evitts Creek (North Branch Potomac River tributary) =

River in the U.S. states of Pennsylvania and Maryland

Coordinates: 39°55′N 78°36′W

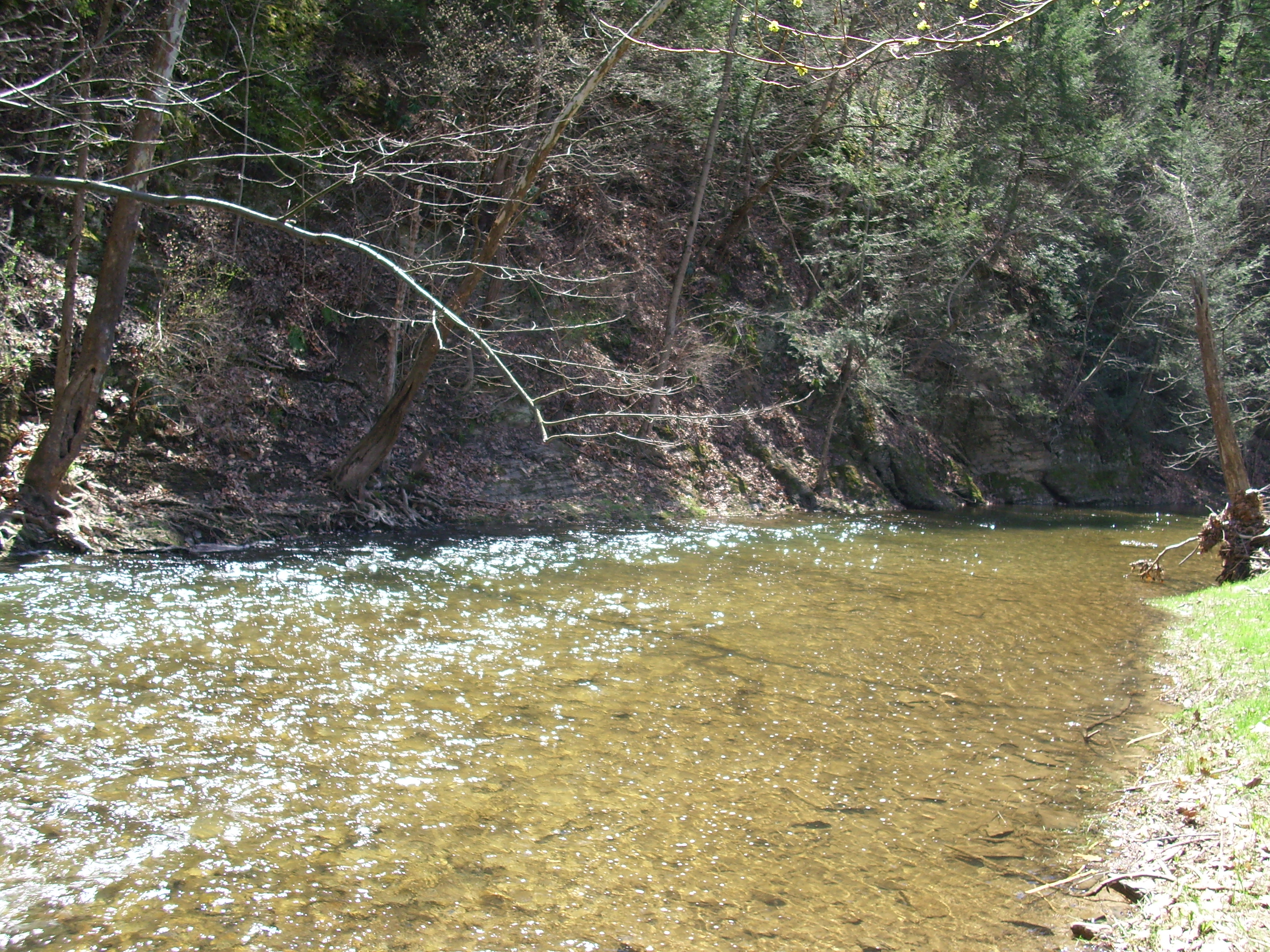
Approximately a mile upstream of the confluence with the Potomac River

Evitts Creek is a tributary stream of the North Branch Potomac River in the U.S. states of Pennsylvania and Maryland. The confluence of Evitts Creek and the North Branch Potomac River is located 2 miles (3 km) east of Cumberland, Maryland.

Evitts Creek is 30.2 miles (48.6 km) long. It flows from southwestern Pennsylvania through western Maryland. The stream rises in central Bedford County, Pennsylvania, and flows southwest between the ridges of Evitts Mountain and Wills Mountain, through the Lake Koon and Lake Gordon reservoirs and into the North Branch Potomac River southeast of Cumberland at 39°55'N 78°36'W.

Evitts Creek and Evitts Mountain are named in honor of an early pioneer in Allegany County, Maryland, who in the 1780s decided to contemplate his bachelorhood from the isolated top of what is today called Evitts Mountain, far from the distractions of society. At the top of the over 2,000-foot-high (610 m) Evitts Mountain ridge is what is supposedly his old homestead, from which he would return by the same route every day hiking a steep 3.5-mile (5.6 km) trail, today called Evitts Homestead Trail. Rocky Gap Run, a tributary of Evitts Creek, runs past the eastern base of Evitts Mountain and into what is today Rocky Gap State Park.

The water supply of Cumberland is provided by Evitts Creek.

Brook trout are native to Evitts Creek as well as the surrounding area, but current populations are limited to nonexistent. Trout are stocked annually in both Pennsylvania and Maryland. Bass, catfish, and bluegill also inhabit the creek.

Several historical incidents have been recorded along Evitts Creek:

- In colonial days, Frazier's Plantation lay just upstream from Evitts Creek. Jane Frazier was carried west by Indians in 1755, escaping and making her way back a year later.
- At Evitts Creek, Union forces turned back Confederate cavalry in the Battle of Folck's Mill in August 1864, at the conclusion of the raid that burned Chambersburg, Pennsylvania. From here the Confederates retreated to Oldtown, Maryland, and crossed the river after another skirmish.

== See also ==
- List of Maryland rivers
- List of rivers of Pennsylvania
