= National Register of Historic Places listings in Washington County, Maryland =

Location of Washington County in Maryland

This is a list of the National Register of Historic Places listings in Washington County, Maryland.

This is intended to be a complete list of the properties and districts on the National Register of Historic Places in Washington County, Maryland, United States. Latitude and longitude coordinates are provided for many National Register properties and districts; these locations may be seen together in a map.

There are 104 properties and districts listed on the National Register in the county, including 3 National Historic Landmarks.

Contents: Counties in Maryland
Allegany - Anne Arundel - Baltimore (city) - Baltimore County - Calvert - Caroline - Carroll - Cecil - Charles - Dorchester - Frederick - Garrett - Harford - Howard - Kent - Montgomery - Prince George's - Queen Anne's - Somerset - St. Mary's - Talbot - Washington - Wicomico - Worcester

This National Park Service list is complete through NPS recent listings posted April 24, 2026.

== Current listings ==
	Name on the Register	Image	Date listed	Location	City or town	Description
1	Antietam Farm		February 23, 2026 (#100010858)	3724 Mills Road; 39°25′01″N 77°43′37″W	Sharpsburg	
2	Antietam Furnace Complex Archeological Site		August 25, 1983 (#83002963)	Address Restricted	Hagerstown	
3	Antietam Hall	Antietam Hall	September 24, 1979 (#79003269)	525 Indian Lane; 39°38′12″N 77°40′55″W	Hagerstown	
4	Antietam Iron Furnace Site and Antietam Village	Antietam Iron Furnace Site and Antietam Village	June 26, 1975 (#75000149)	Confluence of Antietam Creek and the Potomac River; 39°25′01″N 77°44′33″W	Antietam	
5	Antietam National Battlefield	Antietam National Battlefield	October 15, 1966 (#66000038)	North of Sharpsburg off Maryland Route 45; 39°27′04″N 77°41′09″W	Sharpsburg	Civil War battlefield site.
6	B&O Bridge	B&O Bridge	November 23, 1977 (#77000704)	Northwest of Keedysville over Antietam Creek; 39°30′15″N 77°42′49″W	Keedysville	
7	B & O Railroad Potomac River Crossing	B & O Railroad Potomac River Crossing	February 14, 1978 (#78001484)	At the confluence of the Shenandoah and Potomac rivers 39°19′27″N 77°43′43″W	Harpers Ferry	
8	Baker Farm		October 19, 1978 (#78001485)	North of Keedysville off Maryland Route 34; 39°29′53″N 77°41′42″W	Keedysville	
9	Bell-Varner House	Bell-Varner House	September 24, 1979 (#79003271)	Southeast of Leitersburg on Unger Rd. 39°40′04″N 77°36′26″W	Leitersburg	
10	Boonsboro Historic District	Boonsboro Historic District	December 23, 2005 (#05001431)	Main St., Potomac St., St. Paul St., High St., Lakin Ave., Center St., Park Dr., Park Ln, Park View, and Young Ave. 39°30′22″N 77°39′09″W	Boonsboro	
11	Bowman House	Bowman House	April 29, 1977 (#77000702)	323 N. Main St. 39°30′42″N 77°39′18″W	Boonsboro	
12	Brightwood	Brightwood	July 30, 1974 (#74000973)	North of Hagerstown off Maryland Route 60, 2 miles (3.2 km) north of Paramont; 39°41′56″N 77°40′43″W	Hagerstown	
13	Cedar Grove		August 27, 1999 (#99000984)	15435 Dellinger Rd. 39°32′07″N 77°50′07″W	Williamsport	
14	William Chapline House	William Chapline House	October 8, 1976 (#76001020)	109 W. Main St. 39°27′29″N 77°44′59″W	Sharpsburg	
15	Chesapeake and Ohio Canal National Historical Park	Chesapeake and Ohio Canal National Historical Park	October 15, 1966 (#66000036)	Bordering the Potomac River from Georgetown, Washington, D.C. to Cumberland, Maryland; 39°35′53″N 77°49′40″W	Antietam, Cedar Grove, Hancock, and Sharpsburg	
16	Robert Clagett Farm		June 5, 1999 (#99000132)	Garrett's Mill Rd. 39°21′03″N 77°41′06″W	Knoxville	
17	Colonial Theatre	Colonial Theatre	August 2, 1978 (#78001478)	12-14 S. Potomac St. 39°38′28″N 77°43′13″W	Hagerstown	
18	Cool Hollow Home	Cool Hollow Home	December 17, 2018 (#100003253)	9302 Old National Pike; 39°34′08″N 77°41′23″W	Hagerstown	
19	Ditto Knolls	Ditto Knolls	July 12, 1976 (#76001014)	East of Hagerstown on Landis Rd. 39°36′23″N 77°39′45″W	Hagerstown	
20	Daniel Donnelly House		December 24, 2003 (#03001333)	14906 Falling Waters Rd. 39°33′23″N 77°51′15″W	Williamsport	
21	Dorsey-Palmer House	Dorsey-Palmer House	April 15, 1978 (#78001479)	North of Hagerstown on Maryland Route 60; 39°40′41″N 77°41′02″W	Hagerstown	
22	Doub Farm		November 15, 1978 (#78001486)	North of Keedysville; 39°29′37″N 77°41′51″W	Keedysville	
23	Doub's Mill Historic District	Doub's Mill Historic District	October 1, 1979 (#79003270)	Southwest of Beaver Creek on Beaver Creek Rd. 39°34′43″N 77°39′18″W	Beaver Creek	
24	Elliot-Bester House	Elliot-Bester House	May 2, 1975 (#75000924)	205-207 S. Potomac St. 39°38′19″N 77°43′22″W	Hagerstown	
25	Elmwood	Elmwood	December 26, 2012 (#12001085)	16311 Kendle Rd. 39°35′10″N 77°48′06″W	Williamsport	
26	Joseph Fiery House		December 27, 2002 (#02001588)	15107 Hicksville Rd. 39°42′06″N 77°50′49″W	Clear Spring	
27	Fort Frederick	Fort Frederick	November 7, 1973 (#73000939)	Southeast of Big Pool near the junction of Maryland Routes 44 and 56; 39°36′33″N 78°00′12″W	Big Pool	
28	Jacob M. Funk Farm	Jacob M. Funk Farm	October 14, 2010 (#10000829)	21116 Black Rock Road; 39°34′49″N 77°37′58″W	Hagerstown	
29	Funkstown Historic District	Funkstown Historic District	September 8, 2000 (#00001050)	Roughly bounded by Antietam Creek, U.S. Route 40A, Stouffer Ave., and High St. 39°36′30″N 77°42′36″W	Funkstown	
30	Garden Hill	Garden Hill	December 27, 2002 (#02001590)	1251 Frederick St. 39°36′49″N 77°42′45″W	Hagerstown	
31	Geeting Farm	Geeting Farm	November 25, 1977 (#77000705)	South of Keedysville at Geeting and Dog Rds. 39°28′40″N 77°41′54″W	Keedysville	
32	Good-Hartle Farm	Good-Hartle Farm	December 9, 1999 (#99001543)	13357 Little Antietam Rd. 39°40′52″N 77°37′41″W	Hagerstown	
33	Good-Reilly House	Good-Reilly House	December 30, 2002 (#02001591)	107 E. Main St. 39°27′30″N 77°44′55″W	Sharpsburg	
34	Hager House	Hager House	November 5, 1974 (#74000974)	19 Key St. 39°38′22″N 77°43′50″W	Hagerstown	
35	William Hagerman Farmstead		December 27, 2002 (#02001592)	7207 Dam #4 Rd. 39°30′41″N 77°49′00″W	Sharpsburg	
36	Hagerstown Armory	Hagerstown Armory	September 25, 1985 (#85002673)	328 N. Potomac St. 39°38′47″N 77°43′00″W	Hagerstown	
37	Hagerstown Charity School	Hagerstown Charity School	December 16, 1982 (#82001601)	102 E. Washington St. 39°38′26″N 77°43′05″W	Hagerstown	
38	Hagerstown City Park Historic District	Hagerstown City Park Historic District	July 5, 1990 (#90001017)	Roughly bounded by W. Howard St., Guilford Ave., Memorial, S. Walnut St., and the Norfolk & Western railroad line 39°38′10″N 77°43′50″W	Hagerstown	
39	Hagerstown Commercial Core Historic District	Hagerstown Commercial Core Historic District	January 17, 1983 (#83002964)	Potomac, Washington, Franklin, Antietam, Summit, and Jonathan Sts. 39°38′33″N 77°43′18″W	Hagerstown	
40	Hagerstown Historic District	Hagerstown Historic District	February 2, 1994 (#93001551)	Roughly bounded by Prospect and Cannon Aves., Memorial Boulevard, and the CSX railroad line 39°38′23″N 77°43′06″W	Hagerstown	
41	Harpers Ferry National Historical Park	Harpers Ferry National Historical Park	October 15, 1966 (#66000041)	At the confluence of the Shenandoah and Potomac rivers 39°18′59″N 77°43′09″W	Harpers Ferry	
42	Joseph C. Hays House	Joseph C. Hays House	December 12, 2006 (#06001125)	103-105 W. Main St. 39°27′30″N 77°44′58″W	Sharpsburg	
43	Jacob Highbarger House	Jacob Highbarger House	December 27, 2002 (#02001593)	201 W. Main St. 39°27′27″N 77°45′06″W	Sharpsburg	
44	Hills, Dales and The Vinyard	Hills, Dales and The Vinyard	December 1, 2000 (#00001460)	16 Dogstreet Rd. 39°29′00″N 77°42′25″W	Keedysville	
45	Hitt's Mill and Houses	Hitt's Mill and Houses	April 12, 1979 (#79001147)	West of Keedysville off Maryland Route 34; 39°29′06″N 77°42′44″W	Keedysville	
46	Hoffman Farm	Hoffman Farm	October 10, 1997 (#97001183)	18651 Keedysville Rd. 39°29′53″N 77°43′19″W	Keedysville	
47	Hogmire-Berryman Farm		March 28, 1980 (#80001842)	North of Spielman off Maryland Route 63; 39°32′32″N 77°46′00″W	Spielman	
48	Houses At 16-22 East Lee Street	Houses At 16-22 East Lee Street	November 25, 1977 (#77000703)	16-22 E. Lee St. 39°38′12″N 77°43′19″W	Hagerstown	
49	Huckleberry Hall		December 28, 1990 (#90001994)	Charles Mill Rd., west of its junction with Maryland Route 64; 39°41′18″N 77°35′27″W	Leitersburg	
50	Ingram-Schipper Farm		September 24, 1979 (#79003259)	Mapleville Road (MD 66), North of Boonsboro; 39°33′46″N 77°39′37″W	Boonsboro	
51	Kennedy Farm	Kennedy Farm	November 7, 1973 (#73000941)	Chestnut Grove Rd. 39°22′47″N 77°42′56″W	Samples Manor	Known as John Brown's Headquarters.
52	Keedy House	Keedy House	July 25, 1974 (#74000972)	Northwest of Boonsboro off U.S. Route 40A on Barnes Rd. 39°32′22″N 77°41′55″W	Boonsboro	
53	Keedysville Historic District	Keedysville Historic District	October 26, 2001 (#01001183)	Along Main St. 39°29′12″N 77°41′56″W	Keedysville	
54	Kefauver Place		August 26, 2005 (#05000908)	20515 Park Hall Rd. 39°27′01″N 77°39′14″W	Rohrersville	
55	Lantz-Zeigler House	Lantz-Zeigler House	October 8, 1998 (#98001231)	21000 Leitersburg Pike; 39°41′20″N 77°38′17″W	Hagerstown	
56	Lehman's Mill Historic District	Lehman's Mill Historic District	January 4, 1991 (#90001945)	Lehman's Mill Rd. between Marsh Pike and Marsh Run; 39°42′41″N 77°40′34″W	Hagerstown	
57	Leitersburg Historic District	Leitersburg Historic District	December 19, 2003 (#03001295)	Leitersburg-Smithsburg Rd., Leiter St., Leiter's Mill Rd., and Ringgold St. 39°41′42″N 77°37′15″W	Leitersburg	
58	Long Meadows	Long Meadows	September 1, 1978 (#78001480)	North of Hagerstown on Marsh Pike; 39°41′41″N 77°41′08″W	Hagerstown	
59	Magnolia Plantation		June 18, 1975 (#75000926)	Northwest of Knoxville off Sandy Hook Rd. 39°20′57″N 77°41′34″W	Knoxville	
60	Mannheim		September 25, 1979 (#79003260)	San Mar Rd. 39°33′19″N 77°37′51″W	San Mar	
61	The Maples		February 24, 1975 (#75000927)	2 miles (3.2 km) southwest of Smithsburg on Maryland Route 66; 39°37′23″N 77°39′38″W	Smithsburg	
62	Marsh Mills		November 22, 1996 (#96001375)	17426 and 17432 Spielman Rd. 39°32′22″N 77°45′44″W	Fairplay	
63	Maryland Theatre	Maryland Theatre	November 13, 1976 (#76001015)	21-23 S. Potomac St. 39°38′29″N 77°43′17″W	Hagerstown	
64	Henry McCauley Farm	Henry McCauley Farm	June 29, 1976 (#76001016)	East of Hagerstown on Mt. Aetna Rd. 39°36′53″N 77°39′46″W	Hagerstown	
65	Mount Airy	Mount Airy	July 10, 1986 (#86001550)	Maryland Route 34; 39°26′55″N 77°46′04″W	Sharpsburg	
66	Nicodemus Mill Complex		August 2, 2001 (#01000821)	20019 Nicodemus Mill Rd. 39°28′34″N 77°40′24″W	Keedysville	
67	Oak Hill Historic District	Oak Hill Historic District	September 18, 1987 (#87001574)	Roughly bounded by W. Irvin, Potomac, and Prospect Aves. and Forest Dr. 39°39′18″N 77°42′38″W	Hagerstown	
68	Old Forge Farm	Old Forge Farm	November 7, 1979 (#79001145)	East of Hagerstown; 39°40′02″N 77°38′58″W	Hagerstown	
69	Old National Pike Milestones	Old National Pike Milestones	November 27, 1975 (#75002107)	Maryland Routes 44 and 165, U.S. Route 40, Alternate U.S. Route 40, and Scenic U.S. Route 40; 39°25′13″N 77°16′01″W	Hancock	
70	Old Washington County Library	Old Washington County Library	October 2, 1978 (#78001481)	21 Summit Ave. 39°38′34″N 77°43′24″W	Hagerstown	
71	Packhorse Ford	Packhorse Ford	June 15, 2015 (#15000349)	Potomac R. at Canal Rd. 39°25′51″N 77°46′35″W	Sharpsburg	A historic river crossing of the Potomac River.
72	Paradise Manor	Paradise Manor	March 31, 1978 (#78001482)	North of Hagerstown at 2550 Paradise Dr. 39°41′49″N 77°42′03″W	Hagerstown	
73	Piper House	Piper House	October 28, 1999 (#99001279)	200 E. Main St. 39°27′31″N 77°44′45″W	Sharpsburg	
74	Plumb Grove	Plumb Grove	December 7, 2011 (#11000882)	12654 Broadfording Rd. 39°39′40″N 77°56′11″W	Clear Spring	
75	Potomac-Broadway Historic District	Potomac-Broadway Historic District	December 12, 1990 (#90001804)	Roughly Potomac St. and Oak Hill Ave. from Franklin St. to Maple Ave., and North Ave. and Broadway from Park Pl. to Mulberry; 39°38′54″N 77°42′53″W	Hagerstown	
76	Potomac Mills	Potomac Mills	February 5, 2014 (#13001166)	River & Trough Rds. 39°25′50″N 77°46′53″W	Shepherdstown	
77	Price-Miller House	Price-Miller House	May 24, 1976 (#76001018)	131-135 W. Washington St. 39°38′37″N 77°43′25″W	Hagerstown	
78	Rockland Farm	Rockland Farm	July 21, 1978 (#78001483)	728 Antietam Dr. 39°39′21″N 77°41′20″W	Hagerstown	
79	Rockledge	Rockledge	December 18, 2003 (#03001292)	13535 Foxfire Ln. 39°41′20″N 77°36′45″W	Hagerstown	
80	Rohrer House	Rohrer House	November 7, 1979 (#79001146)	East of Hagerstown; 39°39′25″N 77°39′40″W	Hagerstown	
81	Rose Hill	Rose Hill	April 11, 1973 (#73000942)	0.5 miles (0.80 km) south of Williamsport on Maryland Route 63; 39°34′41″N 77°49′08″W	Williamsport	
82	Search Well		January 17, 1983 (#83002965)	Southeast of Burtner on Manor Church Rd. 39°31′12″N 77°42′49″W	Burtner	
83	Sharpsburg Historic District	Sharpsburg Historic District	December 24, 2008 (#08001218)	E. and W. Chapline, Antietam, and High Sts. and N. and S. Church, Mechanic, Hall, and Potomac Sts. 39°27′27″N 77°44′56″W	Sharpsburg	
84	Snively Farm		September 24, 1979 (#79001144)	North of Eakles Mills on Mt. Briar Rd. 39°28′13″N 77°41′26″W	Eakles Mills	
85	South Prospect Street Historic District	South Prospect Street Historic District	October 1, 1979 (#79003261)	18-278 S. Prospect St. 39°38′29″N 77°43′35″W	Hagerstown	
86	Sprechers Mill House		January 5, 1978 (#78001487)	Northeast of Williamsport on Hopewell Rd. 39°37′02″N 77°47′40″W	Williamsport	
87	Springfield Farm	Springfield Farm	July 30, 1974 (#74000977)	South of U.S. Route 11; 39°35′48″N 77°48′57″W	Williamsport	
88	St. Mark's Episcopal Church-Lappans	St. Mark's Episcopal Church-Lappans	August 5, 1999 (#99000931)	18313 Lappans Rd. 39°33′03″N 77°44′03″W	Boonsboro	
89	Tammany	Tammany	September 24, 1979 (#79003262)	Northeast of Williamsport off U.S. Route 11; 39°36′39″N 77°47′44″W	Williamsport	
90	Tolson's Chapel	Tolson's Chapel	October 21, 2008 (#08001012)	111 E. High St. 39°27′22″N 77°44′47″W	Sharpsburg	Designated a National Historic Landmark in 2021.
91	Trovinger Mill	Trovinger Mill	April 21, 1975 (#75000925)	3 miles (4.8 km) east of Hagerstown on Trovinger Mill Rd. and Antietam Creek; 39°39′09″N 77°39′56″W	Hagerstown	
92	Valentia	Valentia	June 27, 1974 (#74000975)	South of Hagerstown on Poffenberger Rd. off Maryland Route 65; 39°35′42″N 77°42′41″W	Hagerstown	
93	Washington County Courthouse	Washington County Courthouse	December 24, 1974 (#74000976)	W. Washington St. and Summit Ave. 39°38′34″N 77°43′22″W	Hagerstown	
94	Washington Monument	Washington Monument	November 3, 1972 (#72000588)	Washington Monument State Park; 39°30′02″N 77°37′24″W	Boonsboro	
95	Western Maryland Railroad Right-of-Way, Milepost 126 to Milepost 160	Western Maryland Railroad Right-of-Way, Milepost 126 to Milepost 160	July 23, 1981 (#81000078)	Milepost 126 to Milepost 160; 39°33′53″N 78°32′08″W	Woodmont	
96	Western Maryland Railway Station	Western Maryland Railway Station	April 22, 1976 (#76001019)	Burhans Boulevard; 39°38′44″N 77°43′34″W	Hagerstown	
97	Western Maryland Railway Steam Locomotive No. 202	Western Maryland Railway Steam Locomotive No. 202	June 7, 1984 (#84001884)	City Park; 39°38′06″N 77°44′06″W	Hagerstown	
98	Williamsport Historic District	Williamsport Historic District	October 26, 2001 (#01001184)	Roughly bounded by the Chesapeake and Ohio Canal, Conococheague Creek, Springfield Ln., and W. Frederick St. 39°35′58″N 77°49′15″W	Williamsport	
99	The Willows	The Willows	February 23, 1973 (#73000940)	Southwest of Cavetown on Maryland Route 66; 39°37′34″N 77°36′12″W	Cavetown	
100	Wilson School	Wilson School	October 30, 1998 (#98001293)	Rufus Wilson Rd. 39°39′23″N 77°51′11″W	Clear Spring	
101	Wilson's Bridge	Wilson's Bridge	March 15, 1982 (#82002822)	U.S. Route 40; 39°39′27″N 77°50′53″W	Hagerstown	
102	Rufus Wilson Complex	Rufus Wilson Complex	December 6, 1996 (#96001416)	14293 Rufus Wilson Rd. 39°39′22″N 77°51′06″W	Clear Spring	
103	Wilson-Miller Farm		May 23, 1980 (#80001841)	Southeast of Sharpsburg; 39°26′24″N 77°45′57″W	Sharpsburg	
104	Woburn Manor		September 13, 2000 (#00001052)	7661 Dam #4 Rd. 39°31′24″N 77°48′45″W	Sharpsburg	

== See also ==
- List of National Historic Landmarks in Maryland
- National Register of Historic Places listings in Maryland
