= Maryland Route 34 =

State highway in Washington County, Maryland, US

Maryland Route 34
- Maryland Route 34 highlighted in red

Route information
- Maintained by MDSHA
- Length: 9.95 mi (16.01 km)
- Existed: 1927–present
- Tourist routes: Chesapeake and Ohio Canal Scenic Byway; Antietam Campaign Scenic Byway

Major junctions
- West end: WV 480 near Shepherdstown, WV
- MD 65 in Sharpsburg
- East end: US 40 Alt. in Boonsboro

Location
- Country: United States
- State: Maryland
- Counties: Washington

Highway system
- Maryland highway system; Interstate; US; State; Scenic Byways
| ← MD 33 | → MD 35 |

Maryland Route 34 (MD 34) is a state highway in the U.S. state of Maryland. Known for most of its length as Shepherdstown Pike, the state highway begins at the West Virginia state line at the Potomac River, where the highway continues south as West Virginia Route 480 (WV 480) through Shepherdstown. The state highway runs 9.95 miles (16.01 km) east to U.S. Route 40 Alternate (US 40 Alternate) in Boonsboro. MD 34 is the main east–west highway of southern Washington County, connecting Shepherdstown and Boonsboro with Sharpsburg and Keedysville. The state highway, which was preceded by the Boonsboro and Sharpstown Turnpike, was constructed as a modern highway in the late 1910s and early 1920s. MD 34's bypass of Keedysville opened around 1960. The western end of the state highway has had three bridges. A 19th-century bridge was destroyed in a 1936 flood and replaced by the James Rumsey Bridge in 1939. The present bridge, also named for James Rumsey, opened in 2005.

== Route description ==
MD 34 begins at the West Virginia State line, where the highway crosses the Potomac River on the James Rumsey Bridge. The highway continues into Shepherdstown as WV 480. MD 34 heads east past an access ramp to the Chesapeake and Ohio Canal National Historical Park as two-lane undivided Shepherdstown Pike through a mix of farmland and forest. The state highway descends into an underpass of Norfolk Southern Railway's Hagerstown District line, which crosses the state highway at an oblique angle then parallels the highway northeast past the historic home Mount Airy. MD 34 splits away from the railroad as the highway enters the town of Sharpsburg. The state highway's name changes to Main Street at its intersection with Mechanic Street. MD 34 passes through the Sharpsburg Historic District, which contains the Jacob Highbarger House, William Chapline House, Good-Reilly House, Joseph C. Hays House, Piper House, and Tolson's Chapel. At the eastern end of the town, the state highway intersects Church Street, which heads north as MD 65 through the main unit of Antietam National Battlefield and south as a county highway toward Burnside's Bridge.

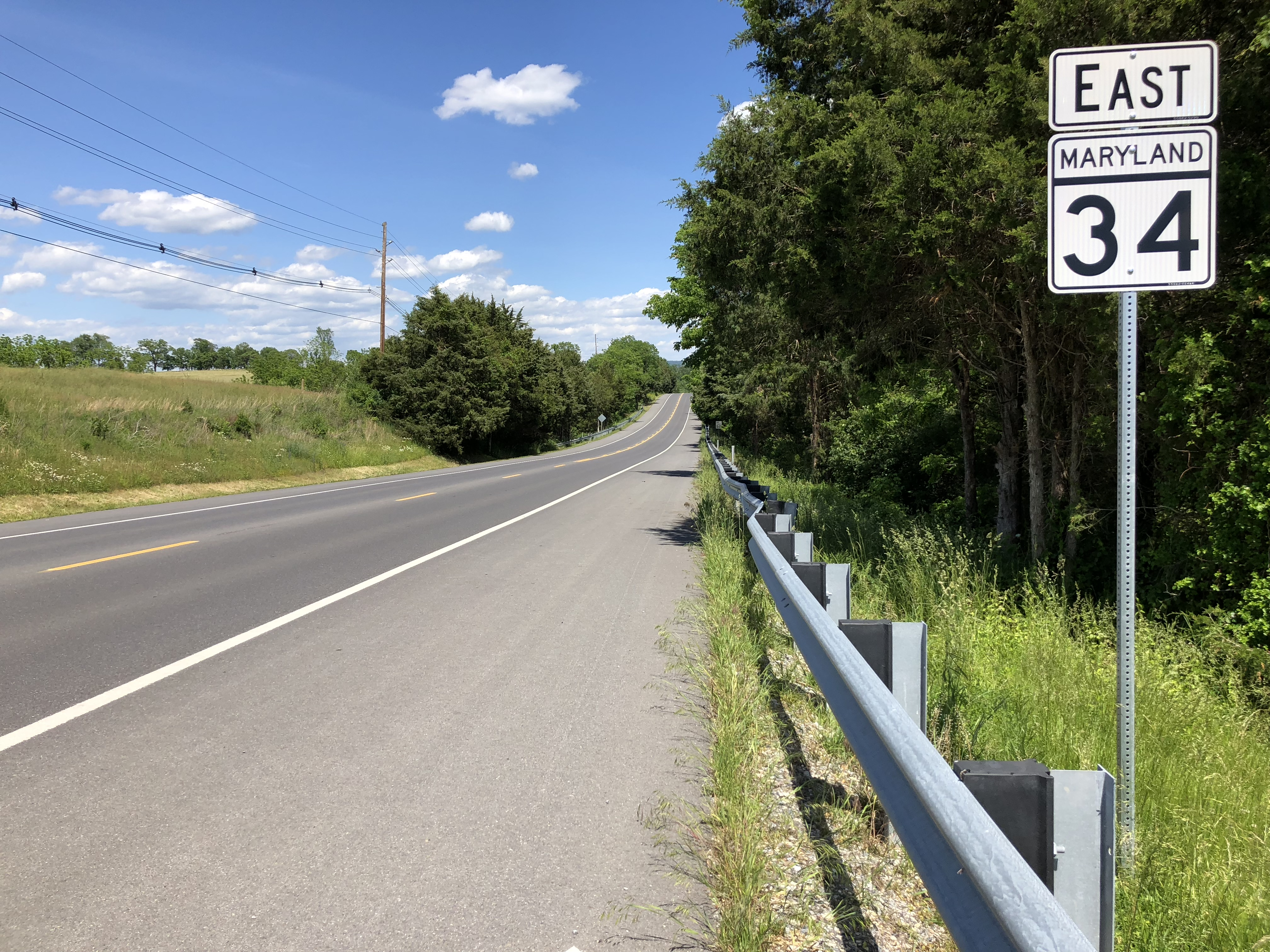
View east along MD 34 through Antietam National Battlefield

MD 34 leaves the town of Sharpsburg and passes through the grounds of Antietam National Battlefield. The state highway passes Antietam National Cemetery and passes through open fields before leaving the federal reservation by crossing Antietam Creek on the Porterstown Bridge. MD 34 continues northeast, passing the Pry House Field Hospital Museum before heading through Keedysville. The old alignment of MD 34, MD 845, splits to the east to pass through the center of town as Main Street while MD 34 passes along the edge of town. MD 34 crosses Little Antietam Creek, crosses an abandoned Baltimore and Ohio Railroad grade, and passes the Doub Farm and Baker Farm before receiving the other end of MD 845, Keedy Drive. The state highway passes through a forested area before passing the Crystal Grottoes caverns. MD 34 continues east through farmland before entering the town of Boonsboro and crossing Beaver Creek. The state highway heads east through the town as Potomac Street before reaching its eastern terminus at US 40 Alternate (Main Street). The roadway continues east as St. Paul Street toward South Mountain.

== History ==
The predecessor highway of much of MD 34 was a 19th-century turnpike called the Boonsboro and Sharpsburg Turnpike between the two eponymous towns via Keedysville. The modern state highway was constructed starting in 1918 with a section from Boonsboro to Keedysville. By 1921, the paved highway was extended west to the Norfolk Southern Railway west of Sharpsburg. The highway was completed to the Potomac River in 1923. MD 34 was one of the original signed Maryland state numbered highways in 1927. The state highway was relocated at its western end following the completion of a new bridge across the Potomac River in 1939. The underpass of the Norfolk Southern Railway between the Potomac River and Sharpsburg was completed around 1940. MD 34 was reconstructed from the Potomac River to Sharpsburg in 1953 and 1954. The state highway was rebuilt from Sharpsburg to Boonsboro between 1956 and 1958, including a new bridge over Antietam Creek. MD 34's bypass of Keedysville opened around 1961; the old highway through town was designated MD 845.

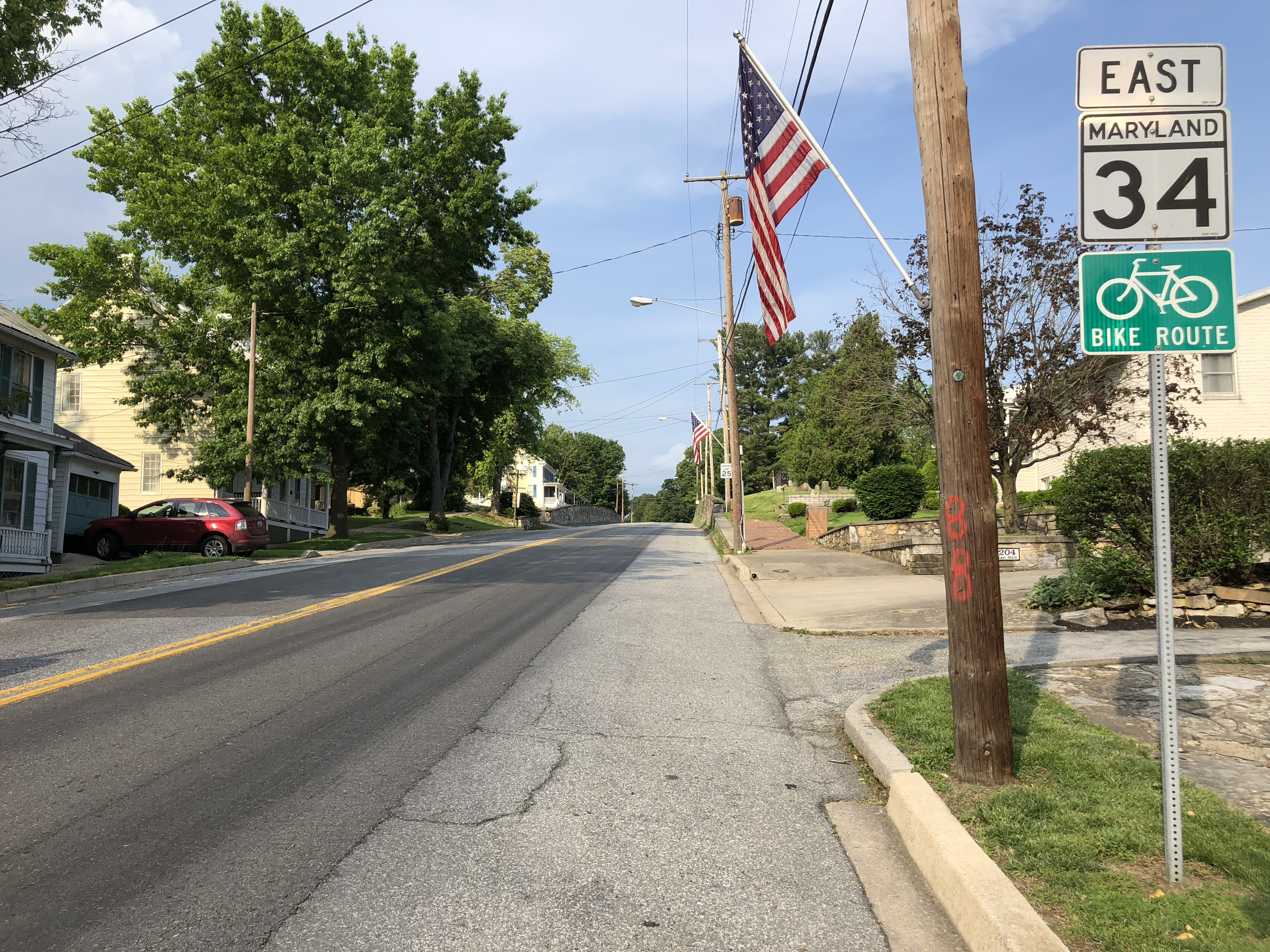
MD 34 eastbound past MD 65 in Sharpsburg

The original river crossing at Shepherdstown was a ford downstream from the modern bridge that had various names, including Boteler's Ford, Pack Horse Ford, Shepherdstown Ford, and Blackford's Ford. This ford was utilized by Confederate forces in their retreat from the Battle of Antietam. Around 1755, Thomas Swearingen started a ferry that operated through 1849, when the first covered bridge was constructed across the river. The first covered bridge was destroyed by forces under Stonewall Jackson in 1861. A second covered bridge was constructed in 1871 and lasted until it was destroyed by the same series of floods in 1889 that devastated Johnstown, Pennsylvania. The piers of the covered bridge remain immediately downstream from the modern bridge. An iron bridge was constructed just upstream of the present bridge. This iron bridge was destroyed in the March 1936 series of floods that heavily damaged Pittsburgh. A high-level Wichert continuous truss bridge was constructed at the site of the present bridge and opened July 15, 1939. The new bridge was dedicated to James Rumsey, an 18th-century pioneer of the steamboat, who demonstrated his invention on the Potomac River at Shepherdstown in 1787. Finally, the present bridge, a steel girder span also named for Rumsey, was constructed starting in June 2003 immediately to the north of the 1939 bridge. The new bridge opened July 15, 2005, exactly 66 years after the opening of the previous bridge, which was subsequently torn down.

== Junction list ==
The entire route is in Washington County.

| Location | mi | km | Destinations | Notes |
|---|---|---|---|---|
| | 0.00 | 0.00 | WV 480 south (North Duke Street) – Shepherdstown | West Virginia state line at Potomac River; western terminus |
| Sharpsburg | 3.57 | 5.75 | MD 65 north (Church Street) / Church Street south – Hagerstown, Antietam National Battlefield | Southern terminus of MD 65 |
| Keedysville | 6.39 | 10.28 | MD 845 north (Main Street) | Southern terminus of MD 845 |
| Keedysville | 7.61 | 12.25 | MD 845 south (Keedy Drive) | Northern terminus of MD 845 |
| Boonsboro | 9.95 | 16.01 | US 40 Alt. (Main Street) / St. Paul Street east – Hagerstown, Middletown | Eastern terminus |
1.000 mi = 1.609 km; 1.000 km = 0.621 mi
