= Chapline =

Chapline is a surname. Notable people with the surname include:

- George Chapline Jr. (born 1942), American condensed matter physicist
- Jesse Grant Chapline (1870–1937), American educator and politician

== See also ==
- William Chapline House, stone house built about 1790 in Maryland
