= Packhorse Ford =

- U.S. National Register of Historic Places
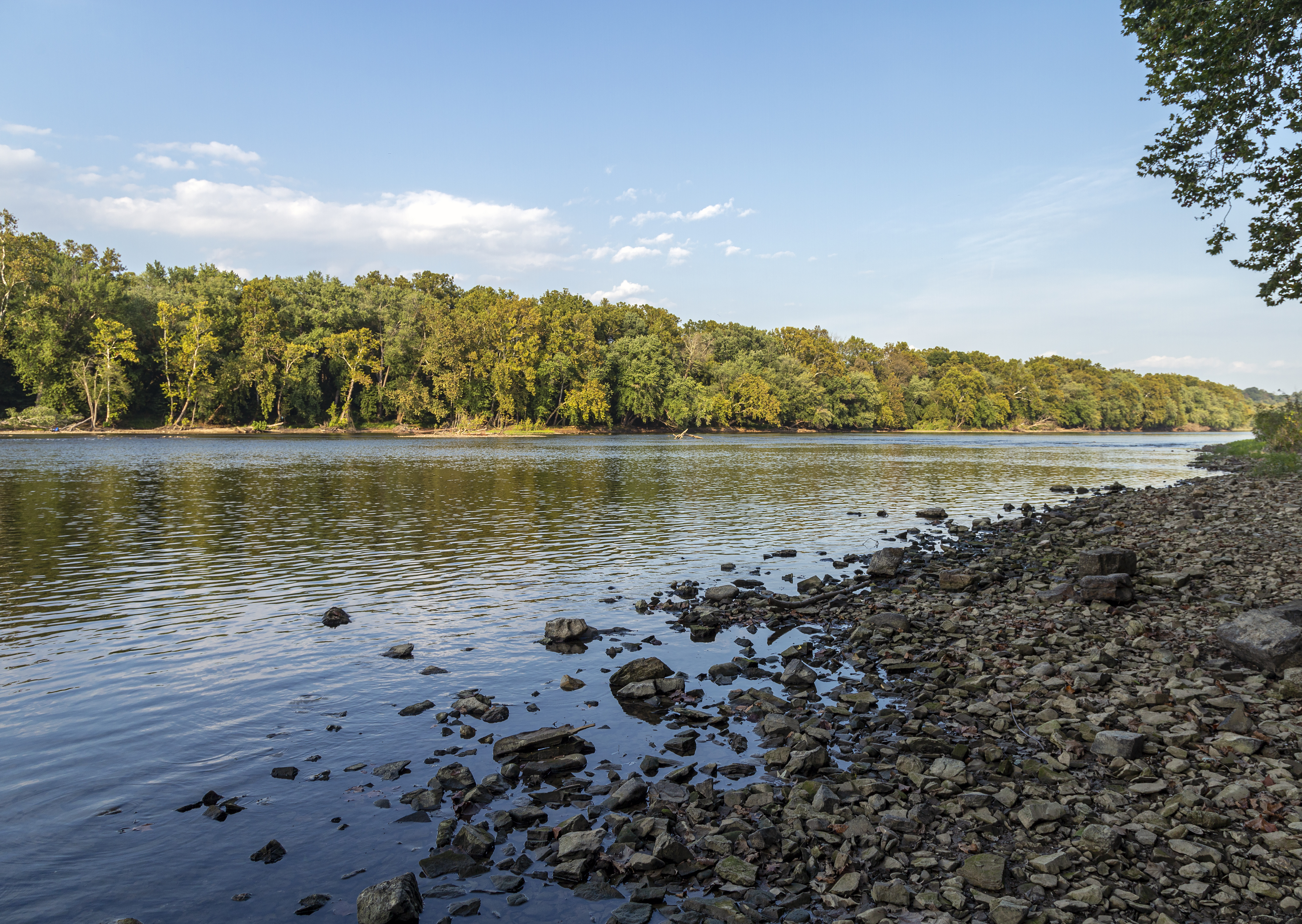

- Location within Maryland Location within the United States
- Location: Canal Rd., Chesapeake and Ohio Canal National Historical Park, near Sharpsburg, Maryland
- Coordinates: 39°25′47″N 77°46′41.5″W
- NRHP reference No.: 15000349
- Added to NRHP: June 15, 2015

Packhorse Ford, also known historically as Pack Horse Ford, Blackford's Ford and Boteler's Ford, is a historic crossing point of the Potomac River. It is located about 1 mile (1.6 km) east of downtown Shepherdstown, West Virginia, and south of Sharpsburg, Maryland, USA. The crossing was a Native American crossing site and eventually became a major crossing point in colonial times. During the American Civil War, it was used by military forces involved in the 1862 Battle of Antietam. The site of the ford is marked by a commemorative marker on the West Virginia side of the river, at the junction of River and Trough Roads.

The ford was listed on the National Register of Historic Places in 2015.

== See also ==
- Battle of Harpers Ferry
- National Register of Historic Places listings in Washington County, Maryland
