= Tolson's Chapel and School =

Historic church in Maryland, United States

- U.S. National Register of Historic Places
- U.S. National Historic Landmark
- U.S. Historic district – Contributing property
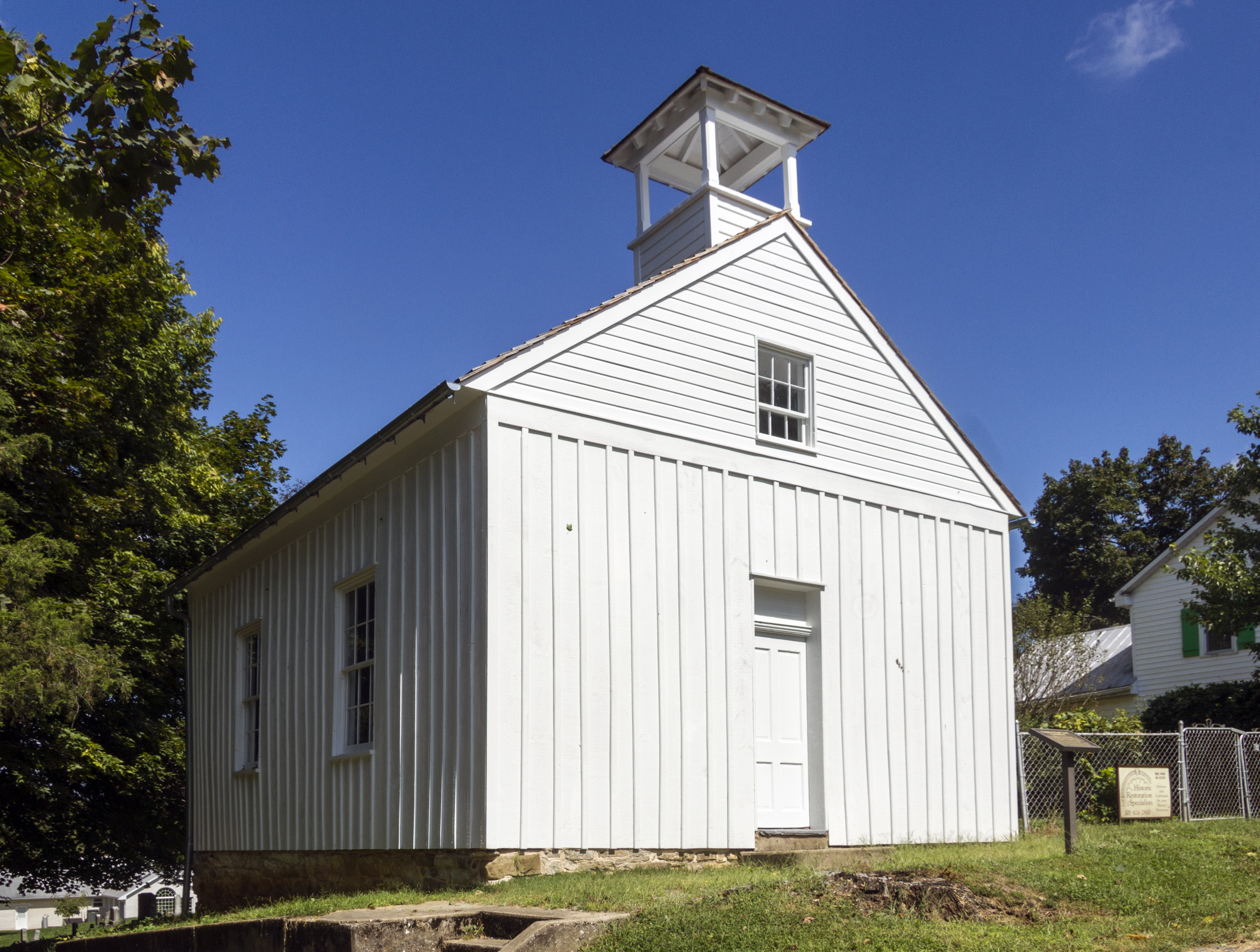
- Tolson's Chapel, September 2012

- Location within Maryland Location within the United States
- Location: 111 E. High St., Sharpsburg, Maryland
- Coordinates: 39°27′22.05″N 77°44′47.0112″W
- Area: 0.3 acres (0.12 ha)
- Built: 1866
- Architectural style: Single log pen
- Part of: Sharpsburg Historic District (ID08001218)
- NRHP reference No.: 08001012, 100006233

Significant dates
- Added to NRHP: October 21, 2008
- Designated NHL: January 13, 2021
- Designated CP: December 24, 2008

Tolson's Chapel and School is a historic African American church located at Sharpsburg, Washington County, Maryland, United States. It was built in 1866 and served as a church and a Freedmen's Bureau school for black residents of Sharpsburg in the years following the American Civil War. It was listed on the National Register of Historic Places in 2008, and was designated a National Historic Landmark in 2021.

== Description and history ==
Tolson's Chapel is located on the south side of Sharpsburg village, on the north side of East High Street midway between South Mechanic Street and South Church Street. It is a single-story log structure, its exterior finished in board-and-batten siding, with a gabled roof that is crowned by a square belfry. The main facade is unadorned except for the main entrance, which is topped by a four-light transom window, and a small sash window set in the end gable. There are sash windows on each of the sides. The interior consists of a single chamber, with pews arranged around a single aisle occupying most of the space. A raised dais and pulpit are set at the far end, and there is a balcony providing additional seating at the near end. Some of the side walls still sport blackboards, a relic of the building's use as a district school.

The chapel was built in 1866 by local African Americans on land given by Samuel Craig, a local free Black. Its first minister was John Tolson, a Methodist minister whose circuit included Sharpsburg. The chapel was named in Tolson's honor after his death at the age of 30 in 1870. The chapel remained in active use into the 20th century, closing due to declining enrollments in 1994. It was formally deconsecrated in 1998, and was taken over by a local non-profit organization in 2000.

In addition to its role as a church, the building saw a variety of community uses. Most significant among these were periods of use when it served as a schoolhouse for local African-Americans. In 1868, the Freedmen's Bureau was convinced to provide funding for teachers, which only lasted a relatively short time. After the state passed an education law in 1872 requiring school districts to have schools for local African-Americans, it was again used as a school until 1899.

== See also ==
- National Register of Historic Places in Washington County, Maryland
- List of National Historic Landmarks in Maryland
