= Elmwood (Williamsport, Maryland) =

Historic house in Maryland, US

- U.S. National Register of Historic Places
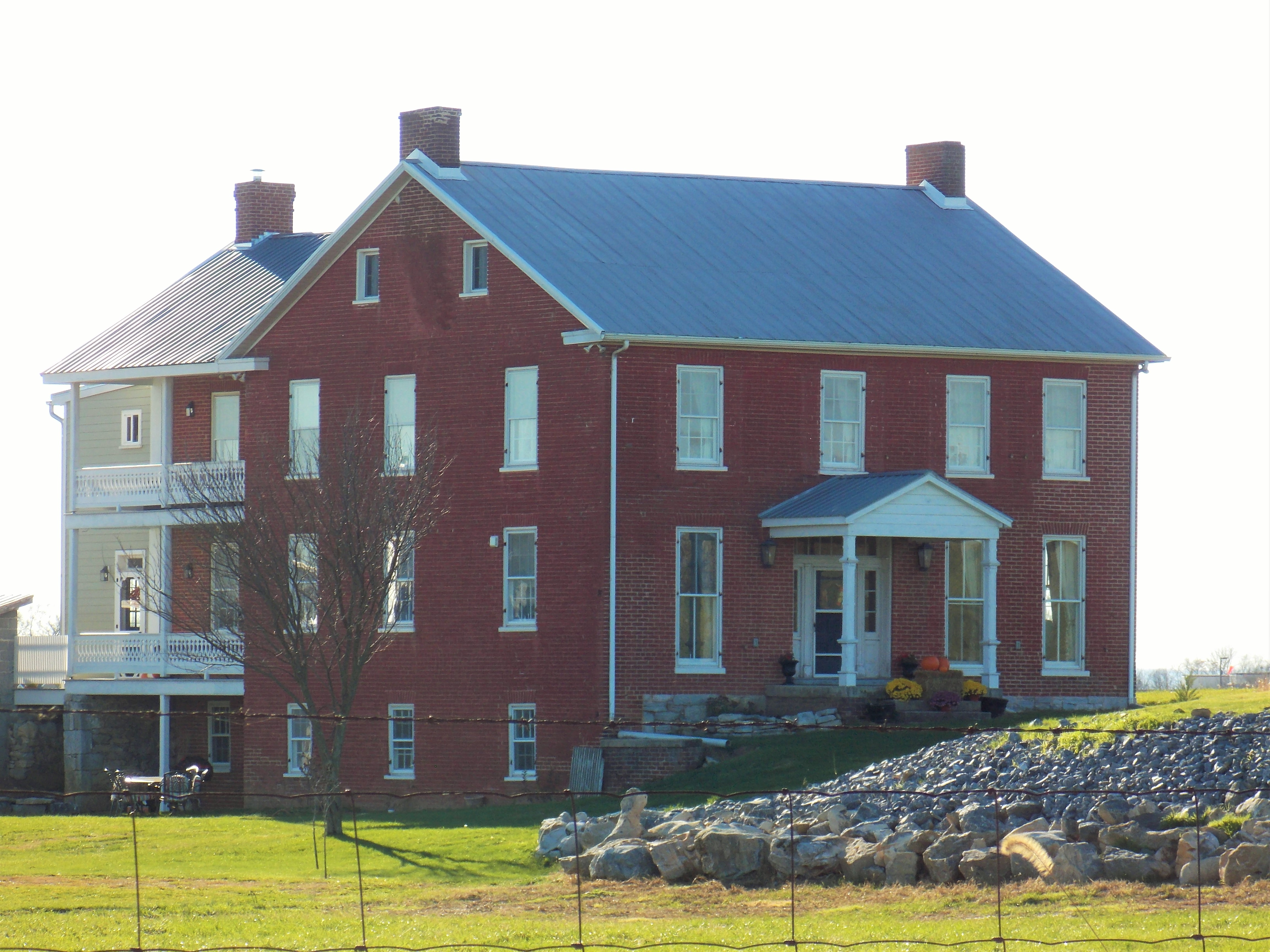

- Location within Maryland Location within the United States
- Location: 16311 Kendle Road, near Williamsport, Maryland
- Coordinates: 39°35′10″N 77°48′06″W
- Area: 6 acres (2.4 ha)
- Built: 1855
- NRHP reference No.: 12001085
- Added to NRHP: December 26, 2012

Elmwood is a historic 19th century estate at 16311 Kendle Road, northeast of Williamsport in Washington County, Maryland. The elegant Greek Revival estate house was built in 1855 by James Downey, a canal merchant. The 6-acre (2.4 ha) remnant of Downey's estate includes a 19th-century barn, milking barn, and hog barn.

The estate was listed on the National Register of Historic Places in 2012.

== See also ==
- National Register of Historic Places listings in Washington County, Maryland
