= Burtner, Maryland =

Unincorporated community in Maryland, U.S.

Coordinates: 39°31′26″N 77°43′12″W

Burtner is an unincorporated community in Washington County, Maryland, United States. Search Well was listed on the National Register of Historic Places in 1983.
