= Mannheim (San Mar, Maryland) =

Historic home in San Mar, Maryland

- U.S. National Register of Historic Places
- Location within Maryland Location within the United States
- Location: San Mar Rd., San Mar, Maryland
- Coordinates: 39°33′19″N 77°37′51″W
- Area: 2 acres (0.81 ha)
- Built: 1790
- NRHP reference No.: 79003260
- Added to NRHP: September 25, 1979

Mannheim is a historic home and former grist mill located at San Mar, Washington County, Maryland, United States. The house is a 2-story, three-bay structure built of roughly coursed local limestone, with a one-story stone kitchen wing. Also on the property is a large frame bank barn and a small board-and-batten service kitchen or wash house. Nearby are the remains of a saw mill a large 2 1/2-story grist mill. The mill on this property, known as "Murray's Mill," was in operation through the 19th century.

It was listed on the National Register of Historic Places in 1979.
