= William Hagerman Farmstead =

- U.S. National Register of Historic Places
- Location within Maryland Location within the United States
- Location: 7207 Dam #4 Rd., Sharpsburg, Maryland
- Coordinates: 39°30′41″N 77°49′0″W
- Area: 5 acres (2.0 ha)
- Built: 1860
- Architectural style: Italianate
- NRHP reference No.: 02001592
- Added to NRHP: December 27, 2002

The William Hagerman Farmstead is a historic home located at Sharpsburg, Washington County, Maryland, United States. The house is a 2 1/2-story five-bay brick dwelling with a raised cellar. It features a double porch, three tiered, extending across the east gable end of the house. The house is an exceptionally intact example of an 1860s vernacular interpretation of the Italianate architecture.

The William Hagerman Farmstead was listed on the National Register of Historic Places in 2002.
