= Henry McCauley Farm =

Historic house in Maryland, United States

- U.S. National Register of Historic Places
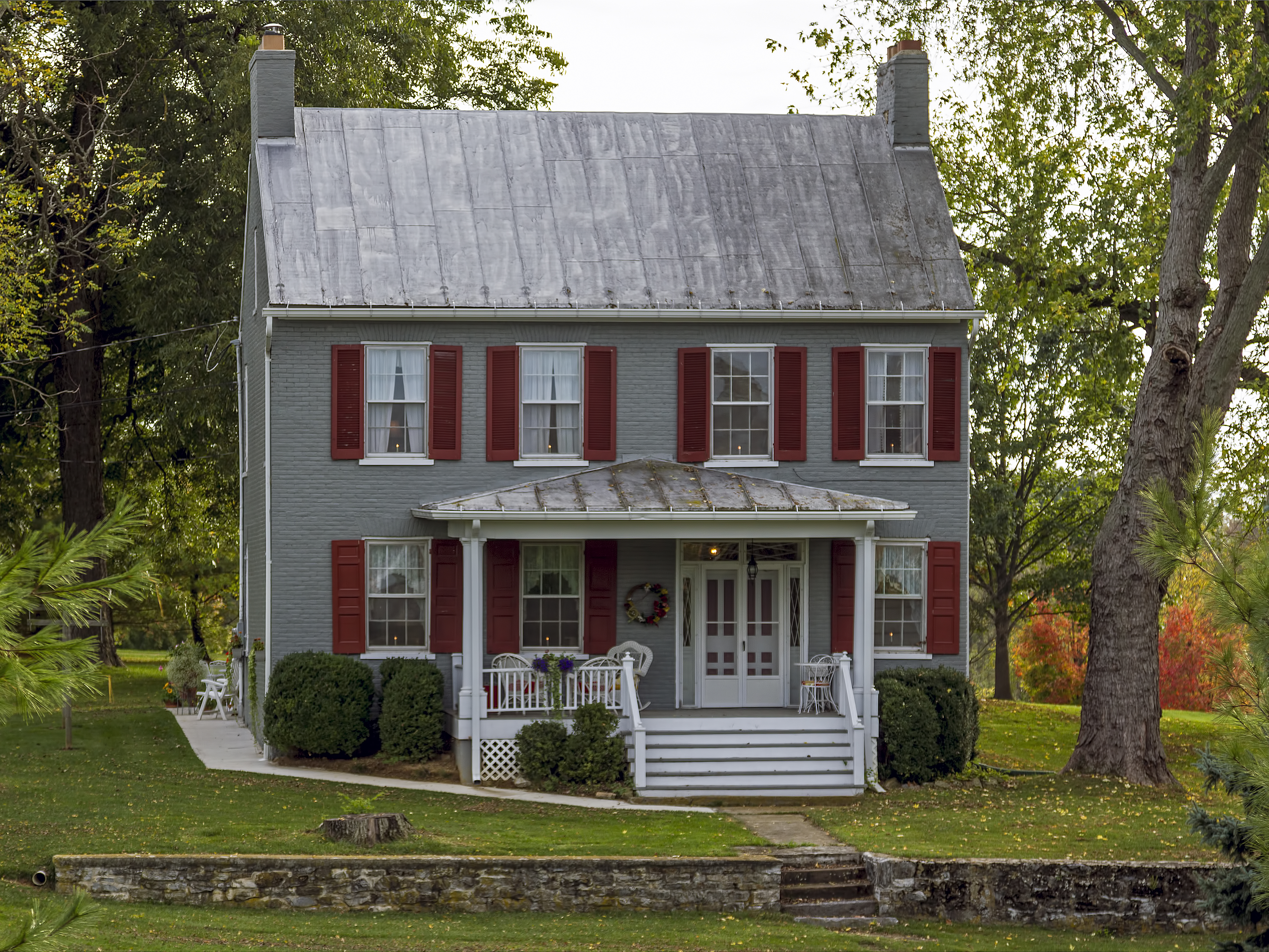

- Location within Maryland Location within the United States
- Location: East of Hagerstown on Mt. Aetna Rd., Hagerstown, Maryland
- Coordinates: 39°36′53″N 77°39′46″W
- Area: 5 acres (2.0 ha)
- Built: c. 1840
- NRHP reference No.: 76001016
- Added to NRHP: June 29, 1976

Henry McCauley Farm is a historic farm complex in Hagerstown, Washington County, Maryland, United States. The house is a four-bay, two-story brick dwelling built between 1830 and 1850, with a four bay ell and a small one-story shed-roofed addition. The walls are set on low limestone foundations. The property also includes a large stone and frame bank barn and a metal windmill for pumping water. It is one of two historic farm complexes located in Ditto Farm Regional Park, along with Ditto Knolls.

The Henry McCauley Farm was listed on the National Register of Historic Places in 1976.
