= Hogmire–Berryman Farm =

Historic district in Maryland, United States

- U.S. National Register of Historic Places
- U.S. Historic district
- Location within Maryland Location within the United States
- Location: North of Spielman off Maryland Route 63, Spielman, Maryland
- Coordinates: 39°32′32″N 77°46′0″W
- Area: 8 acres (3.2 ha)
- Built: 1890
- NRHP reference No.: 80001842
- Added to NRHP: March 28, 1980

Hogmire–Berryman Farm is a historic farm complex and national historic district at Spielman, Washington County, Maryland, United States. It dates from the late 18th or early 19th century, includes a brick house, an early 19th-century stone secondary dwelling, the ruins of a stone outbuilding, a stone root cellar, a brick privy, and a large stone end bank barn. The main brick farmhouse is a multipart structure showing initial construction from the first decade of the 19th century or earlier.

It was added to the National Register of Historic Places in 1980.
