= Wilson–Miller Farm =

- U.S. National Register of Historic Places
- Location within Maryland Location within the United States
- Location: Southeast of Sharpsburg, Sharpsburg, Maryland
- Coordinates: 39°26′24″N 77°45′57″W
- Area: 41 acres (17 ha)
- NRHP reference No.: 80001841
- Added to NRHP: May 23, 1980

Wilson–Miller Farm is a historic home and farm located near Sharpsburg, Washington County, Maryland, United States. The house is a two-story, two-part, eight-bay log building resting on fieldstone foundations. The house features three brick chimneys, each painted red. Outbuildings include a one-story stone springhouse and a frame bank barn.

It was listed on the National Register of Historic Places in 1980.
