= Search Well =

Historic house in Maryland, United States

- U.S. National Register of Historic Places
- Location within Maryland Location within the United States
- Location: Southeast of Burtner on Manor Church Rd., Burtner, Maryland
- Coordinates: 39°31′12″N 77°42′49″W
- Area: 4.5 acres (1.8 ha)
- Architectural style: Early 19th Century Farmstead
- NRHP reference No.: 83002965
- Added to NRHP: January 17, 1983

Search Well is a historic home and farm complex located at Burtner, Washington County, Maryland, United States. It includes a limestone farmhouse dating from about 1800, a smokehouse and a bake house, a 2 1/2-story secondary dwelling used to house slaves or hired help, and a stone spring house.

It was listed on the National Register of Historic Places in 1983.
