= Spielman, Maryland =

Unincorporated community in Maryland, U.S.

Coordinates: 39°32′13″N 77°45′50″W

Spielman is an unincorporated community in Washington County, Maryland, United States. The Hogmire-Berryman Farm was listed on the National Register of Historic Places in 1980.
