= San Mar, Maryland =

- CDP
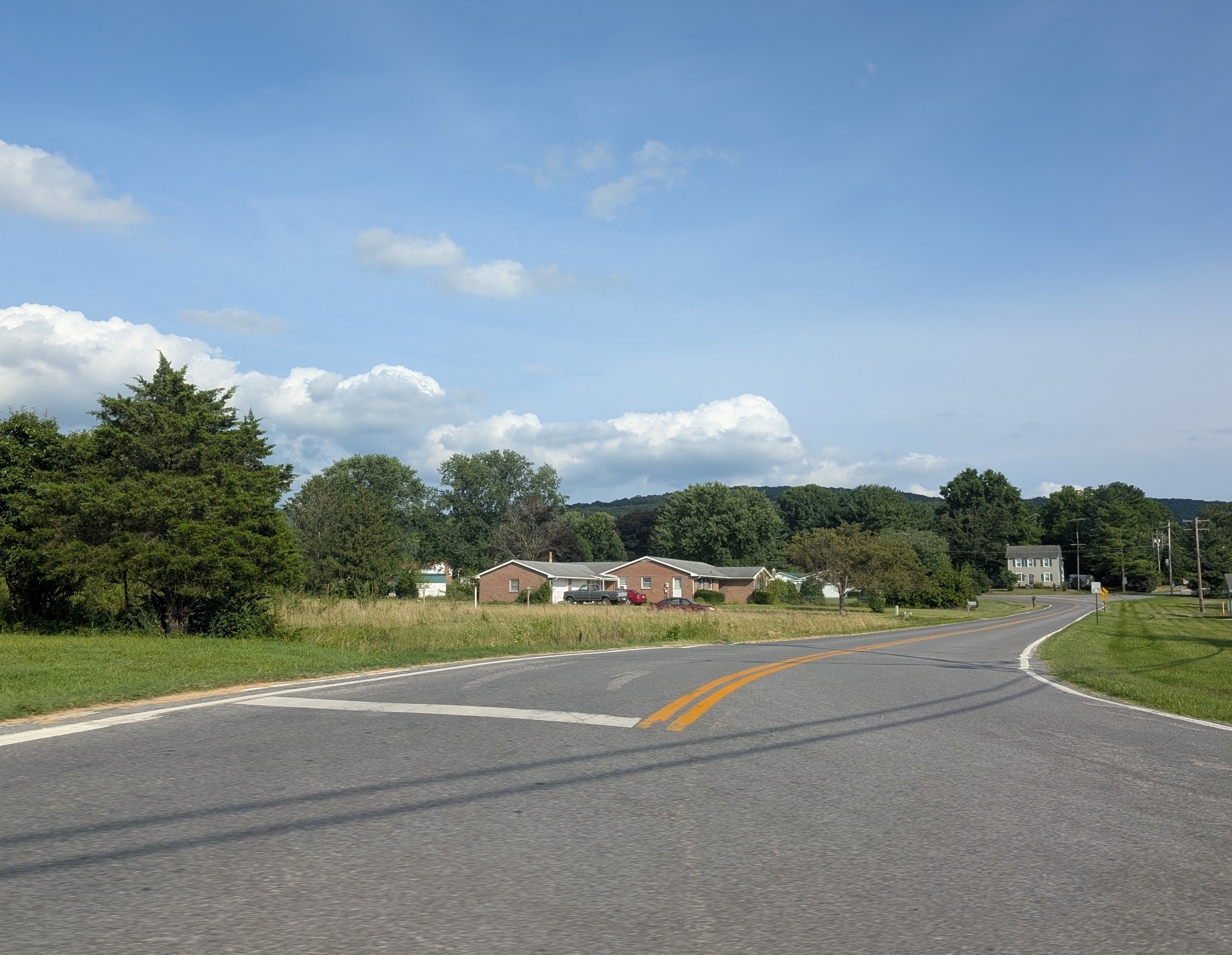
- San Mar Road from MD 66

- Coordinates: 39°33′08″N 77°38′27″W
- Country: United States
- State: Maryland
- County: Washington

Area
  - Total: 0.47 sq mi (1.21 km^{2})
  - Land: 0.47 sq mi (1.21 km^{2})
  - Water: 0 sq mi (0.00 km^{2})
- Elevation: 568 ft (173 m)

Population (2020)
  - Total: 366
  - Density: 785.3/sq mi (303.19/km^{2})
- Time zone: UTC−5 (Eastern (EST))
  - Summer (DST): UTC−4 (EDT)
- ZIP code: 21713
- Area codes: 240 and 301
- FIPS code: 24-70300
- GNIS feature ID: 2389798

San Mar is a census-designated place (CDP) in Washington County, Maryland, United States. The population was 515 at the 2000 census.

== History ==
Mannheim was listed on the National Register of Historic Places in 1979.

== Geography ==
San Mar is located at 39°33′6″N 77°38′46″W (39.551764, −77.646241).

According to the United States Census Bureau, the CDP has a total area of 1.3 square miles (3.4 km^{2}), all land.

== Demographics ==
Historical population
Census	Pop.	Note	%±
2020	366		—
U.S. Decennial Census

As of the census of 2000, there were 515 people, 167 households, and 108 families residing in the CDP. The population density was 394.2 inhabitants per square mile (152.2/km^{2}). There were 178 housing units at an average density of 136.2 per square mile (52.6/km^{2}). The racial makeup of the CDP was 98.83% White, 0.58% African American, 0.19% Native American, 0.19% Asian, and 0.19% from two or more races. Hispanic or Latino of any race were 0.19% of the population.

There were 167 households, out of which 21.6% had children under the age of 18 living with them, 59.9% were married couples living together, 1.8% had a female householder with no husband present, and 35.3% were non-families. 28.7% of all households were made up of individuals, and 22.8% had someone living alone who was 65 years of age or older. The average household size was 2.32 and the average family size was 2.92.

In the CDP, the population was spread out, with 17.1% under the age of 18, 4.5% from 18 to 24, 17.5% from 25 to 44, 19.6% from 45 to 64, and 41.4% who were 65 years of age or older. The median age was 54 years. For every 100 females, there were 66.7 males. For every 100 females age 18 and over, there were 63.0 males.

The median income for a household in the CDP was $60,132, and the median income for a family was $60,893. Males had a median income of $49,038 versus $22,171 for females. The per capita income for the CDP was $18,581. None of the families and 2.0% of the population were living below the poverty line, including no under eighteens and none of those over 64.
