= Cool Hollow House =

Historic house in Maryland, United States

- U.S. National Register of Historic Places
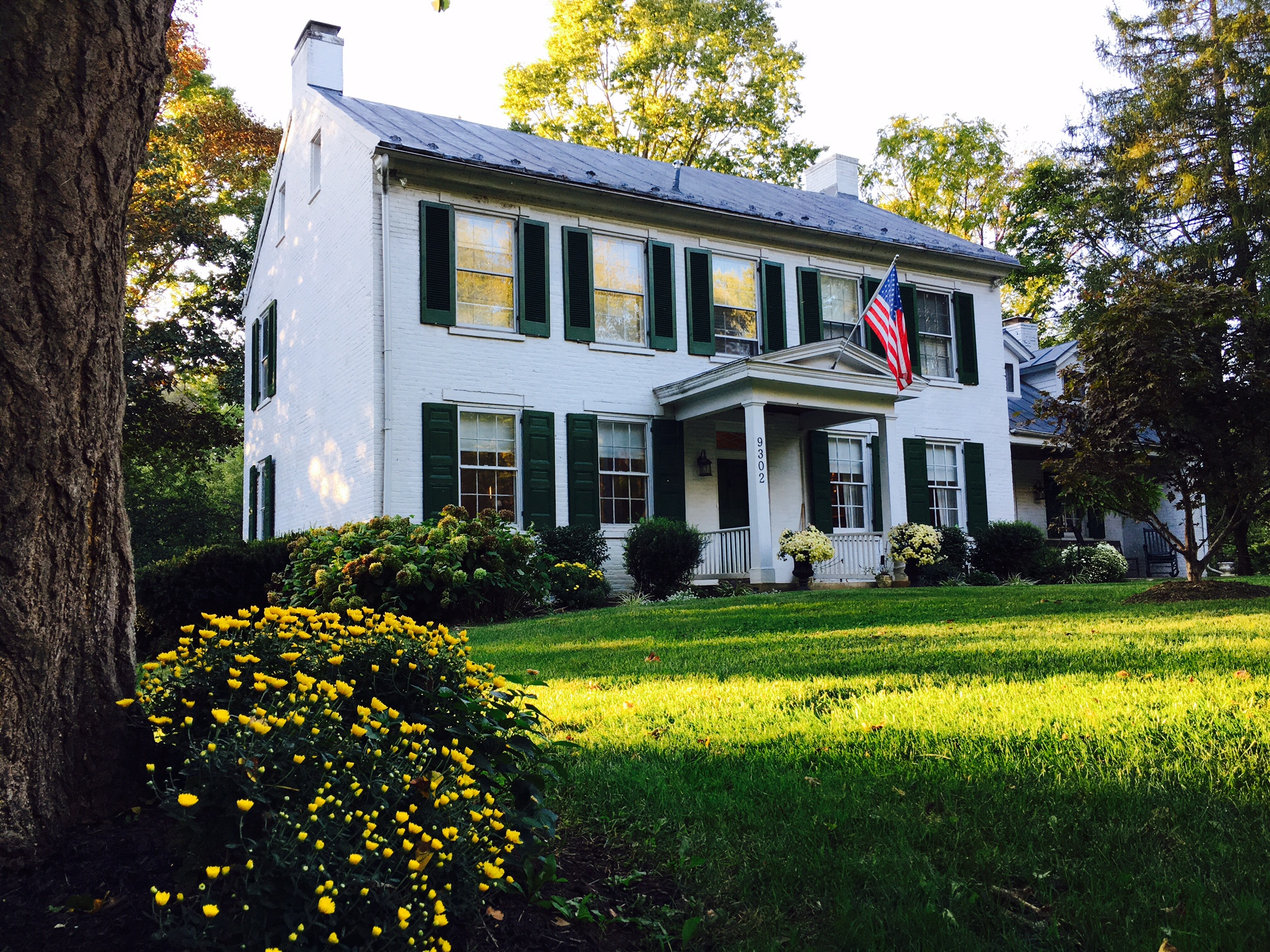
- Cool Hollow House (2016)
- Location: Washington County, Maryland
- Coordinates: 39°34′08″N 77°41′25″W
- Built: 1823
- Architectural style: Greek Revival Federal Architecture
- Website: www.coolhollowhouse.com
- NRHP reference No.: 100003253
- Added to NRHP: December 17, 2018

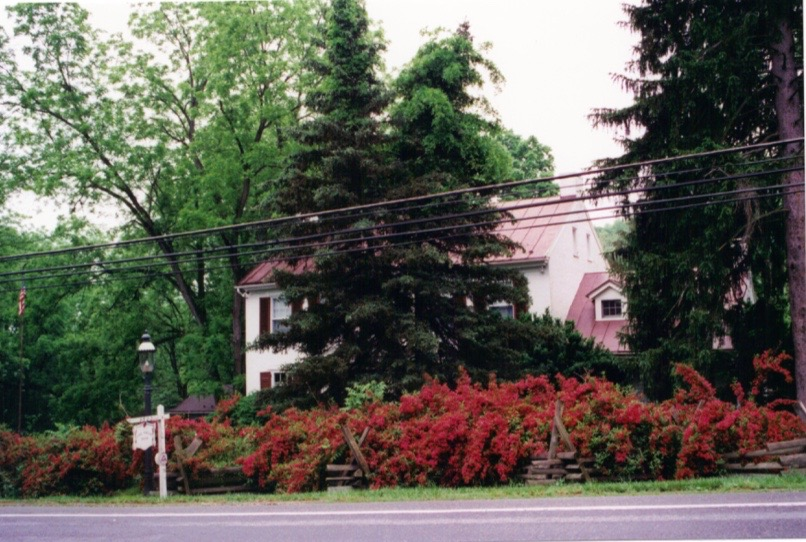
Cool Hollow House, 1983

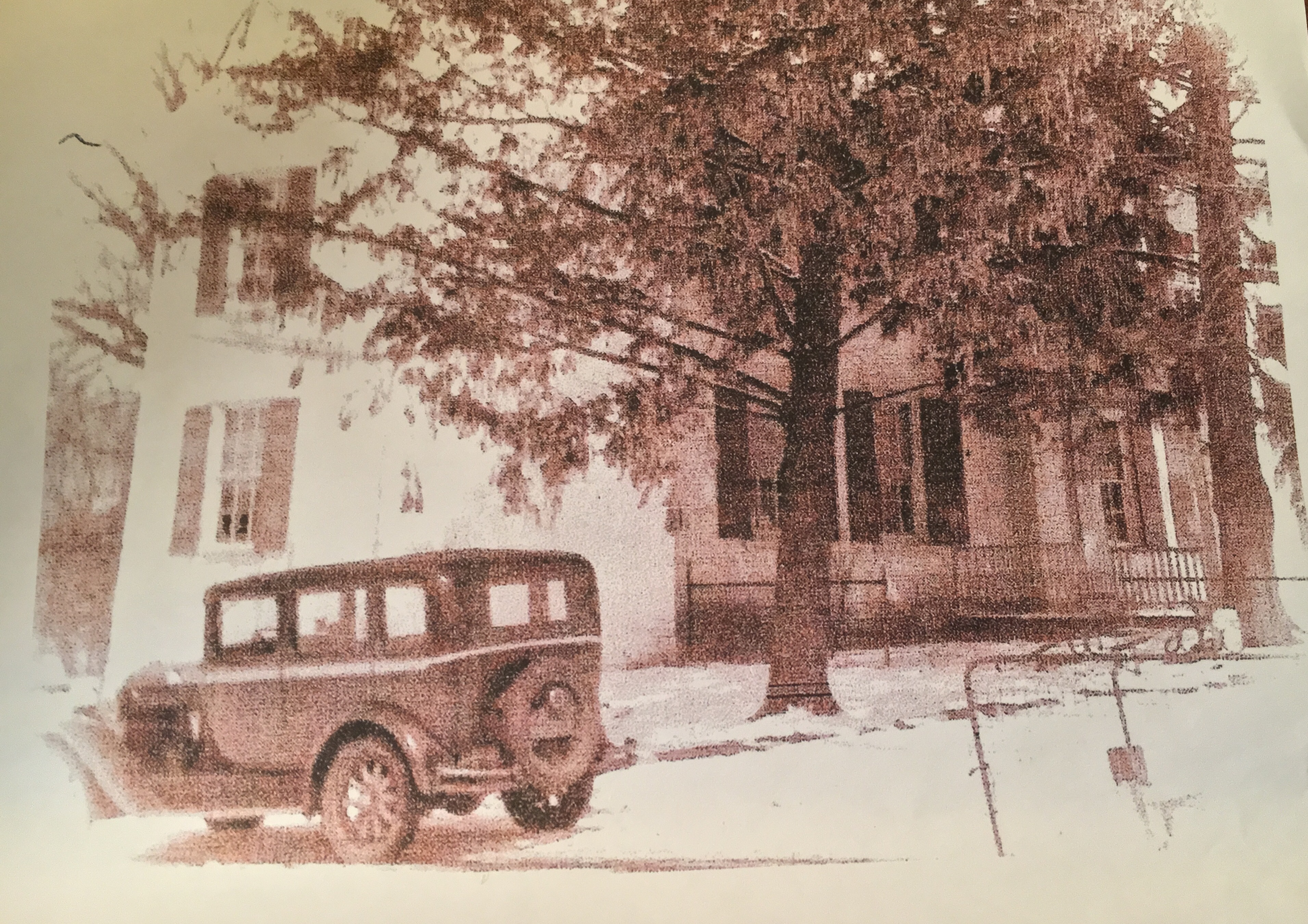
Cool Hollow House, 1934

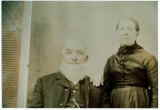
David and Magdalena Schindel c.1880

Cool Hollow House is an early and intact nineteenth century Greek Revival/ Federal transitional style home located in Washington County, Maryland on the National Road. The main house c.1823, and its earlier dependencies sit on land that was part of several colonial land patents. These patents were "Macklefish's Ridge" c.1738, "Chaney's Delight" c.1738, "Strife" c.1740, "Cadiz" c.1759 after the city in Spain. "Stull's Forest" c.1761, and "Chaney's Chance" c.1762. The majority of the land patents were owned by the prominent Chaney family and abut the Antietam Creek. Proof of the importance of this location along the National Road is provided by the fact that the early patents of "Macklefish's Ridge" and "Chaney's Delight" are only predated by 16 of the more than 2250 other patents in this area of the state. The farm was purchased in 1809 by Benjamin Emmert, and after a resurvey in 1821 the patent was named "Emmert's Home". The land and home belonged to Benjamin Emmert's heirs for more than a century, until 1910 when the property left the family.

The property was listed on the Maryland Inventory of Historic Properties (MIHP) in 1978 and added to the National Register of Historic Places December 17, 2018.

== Architecture ==
Cool Hollow House is a fine example of an early 19th-century Greek Revival/Federal Country home. Built in the first quarter of the 19th century, the entire structure is built using handmade bricks; the walls measure 16 inches thick.

According to the Maryland Historical Trust's inventory form,

Cool Hollow House, a two story brick dwelling five bays wide with a central entrance is representative of a major regional type. Such features of its construction as the use of American bond at all elevations; the presence of prominent wooden lintels with corner blocks above the windows; the entrance treatment and interior woodwork all suggest construction during the middle third of the 19th century and influence of the Greek Revival style which was popular in the United States during that period.

== Civil War ==
At the dawn of the United States Civil War in 1861, the assembled property was named Cool Hollow, and was over five hundred acres. It was owned by David and Magdalene Schindel. Mr. Schindel was a prominent businessmen in and around Hagerstown, Maryland. Mrs. Schindel, the daughter of the builder, Benjamin Emmertt, was also the granddaughter of Revolutionary War hero Captain Yost Harbough.

Twice the home saw the ravages of war, first during the Battle of Antietam in September 1862, and second during the Second Battle of Funkstown in July, 1863. During the Retreat from Gettysburg, the Union Army under the direction of Major General George Meade, used "Cool Hollow" as a campsite due to its expansive water frontage on the Antietam Creek, location of a ford, and prominent situation on the National Road. On the late afternoon of July 9, 1863, battle was joined on the Schindel farm "Cool Hollow"/"Emmert's Home". General Buford dispatched Devin and his Cavalry from Beaver Creek on the National Road to intercept and push back the Confederate forces.

"Late on the afternoon of July 9, orders came for the Northern horsemen to mount up. Around 4:00 p.m., Buford ordered Devin to reconnoiter the Confederate positions west of the Beaver Creek bridge between the towns of Boonsboro and Funkstown. While scouting, Devin encountered a detachment of cavalry and artillery left by Stuart on high ground near his main line. About 5:30, Devin deployed a line of mounted skirmishers to sweep the left flank of the Confederates as far as a bend in Antietam Creek. Lt. Albert O. Vincent's combined batteries B and L, 2nd U.S. Artillery, supported the horse soldiers. Devin dismounted two squadrons and, connecting with elements of Gamble's brigade on the left, advanced against the enemy line. Ferguson's Brigade held a prominent ridge overlooking the "Boonsboro Road, and a battery of horse artillery under Capt. Thomas E. Jackson supported him. Grumble Jones rode up with his brigade on the right of Jackson's guns, while Chambliss' Brigade pulled up on the left. Three full brigades of Stuart's horse soldiers now held a strong position on the high ground overlooking Antietam Creek. One company of the 17th Virginia Cavalry deployed as skirmishers. As their Yankee opposites advanced, both sides dashed for a rail fence about 300 hundred yards in front of each side's main line. The Virginians won the foot race and unleashed a potent volley in the faces of the Federals, who tried to use the protection of waist-high corn to cover their advance. The Southerners swept each row with their rifle fire, inflicting severe casualties.19 While the skirmishers dueled, Vincent's Union artillery picked out targets and opened on Ferguson's and Chambliss' positions. "The air above our heads seemed to be full of splinters, bark, and bullets but we were thus far safe and unhurt as the enemies [sic] bullets mostly struck the top of the fence or went over our heads," recalled a member of the 17th Virginia. Their position grew untenable when Chambliss' troopers gave way under Vincent's artillery fire, their withdrawal exposing Ferguson's left flank. When Chambliss' line crumbled, Devin's troopers advanced quickly against it.20 After a short and sharp fight, Devin's skirmishers took the crest while the left squadron ran into a large camp of Stuart's cavalry and quickly dispersed it. "The federal cavalry had advanced on the road so far as to nearly cut us off and I distinctly heard loud commands to halt, but in the confusion supposed it was our officers getting their men into line but it was not, it was the enemy, who had nearly overtaken us," "wrote Virginia trooper James Hodam, who had advanced with his company and carried off a wounded comrade, all while suffering from a wound of his own. As his comrades fell back in the face of the powerful Union attacks, Hodam stumbled. Covered with his own blood, and feeling weak and sick, he leaned against a fence along the road in an effort to catch his breath.21 Pressing their advantage, Devin's and Gamble's brigades drove the Confederates.22 "[We] drove them about 2 miles like fun," one of Gamble's troopers later recounted.23 One member of the 8th New York succinctly described the action. "Out again. Found the rebels about 5 p.m. and made them get, up and get."24 "Sometimes they run us and some times we run them until they brought up their infantry and we had to leave," recalled a member of the 1st Virginia Cavalry.25 Stuart called upon Chew's Battery of horse artillery to help"fend off the enemy attack. With darkness settling on the field, Chew's guns were only able to fire a couple rounds before it was too difficult to find suitable targets.26 Devin's men bivouacked on the field. It had been another good day for "Buford's Hard Hitter," as Devin was known to men in Buford's division.27 "The enemy contested the ground with their usual earnestness," noted one of Gamble's Hoosiers, "but were forced back beyond Beaver Creek. The battle continued until late in evening and we stayed in line of battle."28 Pleasonton proposed that Devin be promoted to brigadier general and assume the position left vacant by Elon Farnsworth's death at Gettysburg.29 A different commander, however, assumed the mantle of leading Farnsworth's former brigade. When Farnsworth fell on July 3, the brigade's senior colonel, Nathaniel P. Richmond "of the 1st West Virginia Cavalry, stepped up and assumed command. On July 9, Col. Othneil de Forest, a 37-year-old Yale-educated broker from New York City, reported for duty. The colonel of the 5th New York Cavalry, de Forest had led the brigade prior to Farnsworth's elevation to general. Now, de Forest was returning as that outfit's senior colonel. His assumption of brigade command on July 10 returned Richmond to regimental command.30"

== Dependencies and property ==
The ruin of an eighteenth century stone mill, possibly a fulling and dyeing mill once operated by Henry Funk, still stands on the west bank of the Antietam Creek. The ruins of a forge stands directly across the creek on the east bank. Along with other early stone buildings, the German vernacular stone bank barn retains a carving in the rafters with a date of 1793.

An early stone and brick well sits in the front yard, and leads to a registered cave known as the Cool Hollow Well and was surveyed by the United States Geological Survey:

Cool Hollow Well Washington County, Funkstown Quadrangle Location: C 5/1/3 Elevation: 440 73 At the base of a 35 foot man made well, in the front yard of Mr. Long's "Cool Hollow House", near Funkstown, there is a low passage which trends southwest for at least 20 feet. The passage was exposed by a partial collapse of the rock lining the well. It would require digging in order to enter but a mass of loose rock directly overhead makes this unwise. Definite solutional pockets were observed on the ceiling. The cave is in the Elbrook Limestone.

Immediately adjacent to the drive is the Cool Hollow Culvert, c.1820. The stone arch bridge is one of the original stone bridges built during the construction of the first federally funded highway, the National Road, started in 1811.

Cool Hollow School House c.1850: An early schoolhouse stood at the northeast corner of the farm along present day Cool Hollow Road. The land and funds were donated by the Schindel Family before the Civil War. The Schoolhouse once sheltered the trusted lieutenant of the famous John Brown John Brown (abolitionist). According to Williams "A History of Washington County, Maryland", "Located on the Schindel Farm, is a schoolhouse famous not only for the good schools that have been taught there by many of the best teachers in Washington County, but for having once sheltered a teacher named Eshleman, who was one of John Brown's trusted lieutenants."

The restoration of the house was featured in an article in the Hagerstown Herald Mail.
