= Ditto Knolls =

- U.S. National Register of Historic Places
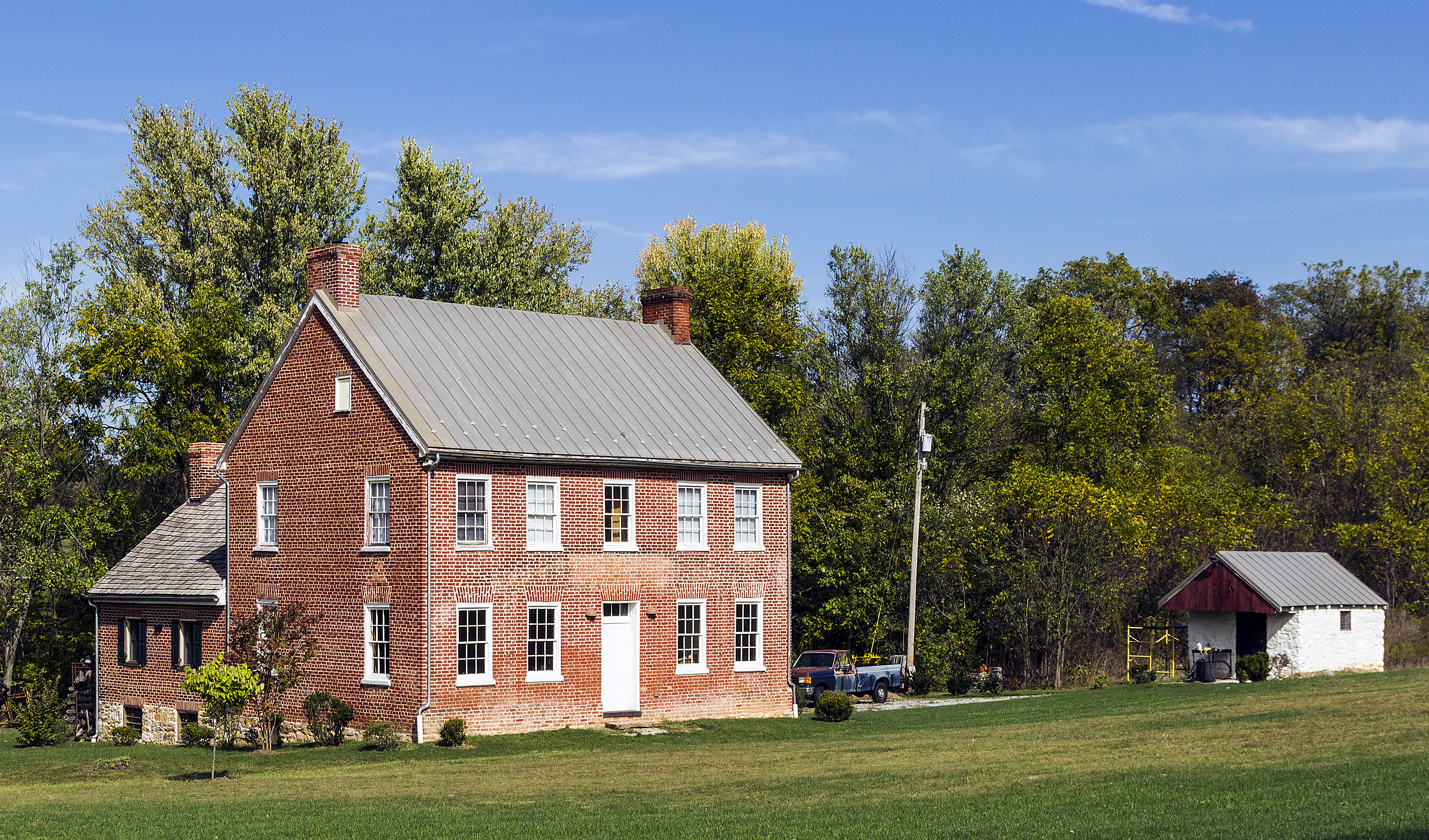

- Location within Maryland Location within the United States
- Location: East of Hagerstown on Landis Rd., near Hagerstown, Maryland
- Coordinates: 39°36′23.2″N 77°39′45.35″W
- Area: 5 acres (2.0 ha)
- Built: 1790
- NRHP reference No.: 76001014
- Added to NRHP: July 12, 1976

Ditto Knolls is a historic home and farm located near Hagerstown, Washington County, Maryland, United States. It was built about 1790, and is a five-bay, two-story brick house with a two-bay, one-story brick rear wing. It features a one-story entrance porch supported by Doric columns. Also on the property is a large stone bank barn and springhouse. It is one of two historic farm complexes located in Ditto Farm Regional Park, along with the Henry McCauley Farm.

Ditto Knolls was listed on the National Register of Historic Places in 1976.
