= Woburn Manor =

Historic house in Maryland, United States

- U.S. National Register of Historic Places
- Location within Maryland Location within the United States
- Location: 7661 Dam #4 Rd., Sharpsburg, Maryland
- Coordinates: 39°31′22″N 77°48′44″W
- Area: 11.5 acres (4.7 ha)
- Built: 1819
- Architectural style: Federal
- NRHP reference No.: 00001052
- Added to NRHP: September 13, 2000

Woburn Manor is a historic home and farm located near Sharpsburg, Washington County, Maryland, United States. The manor house is a Federal style, 2 1/2-story stuccoed stone dwelling with a gable roof structure built around 1820. The stucco is incised to resemble cut block. The property includes a landscaped yard with terracing to the south, stone outbuildings including an out kitchen and smokehouse, and slave quarters.

Woburn Manor was listed on the National Register of Historic Places in 2000.
