= Jacob Highbarger House =

Historic house in Maryland, United States

- U.S. National Register of Historic Places
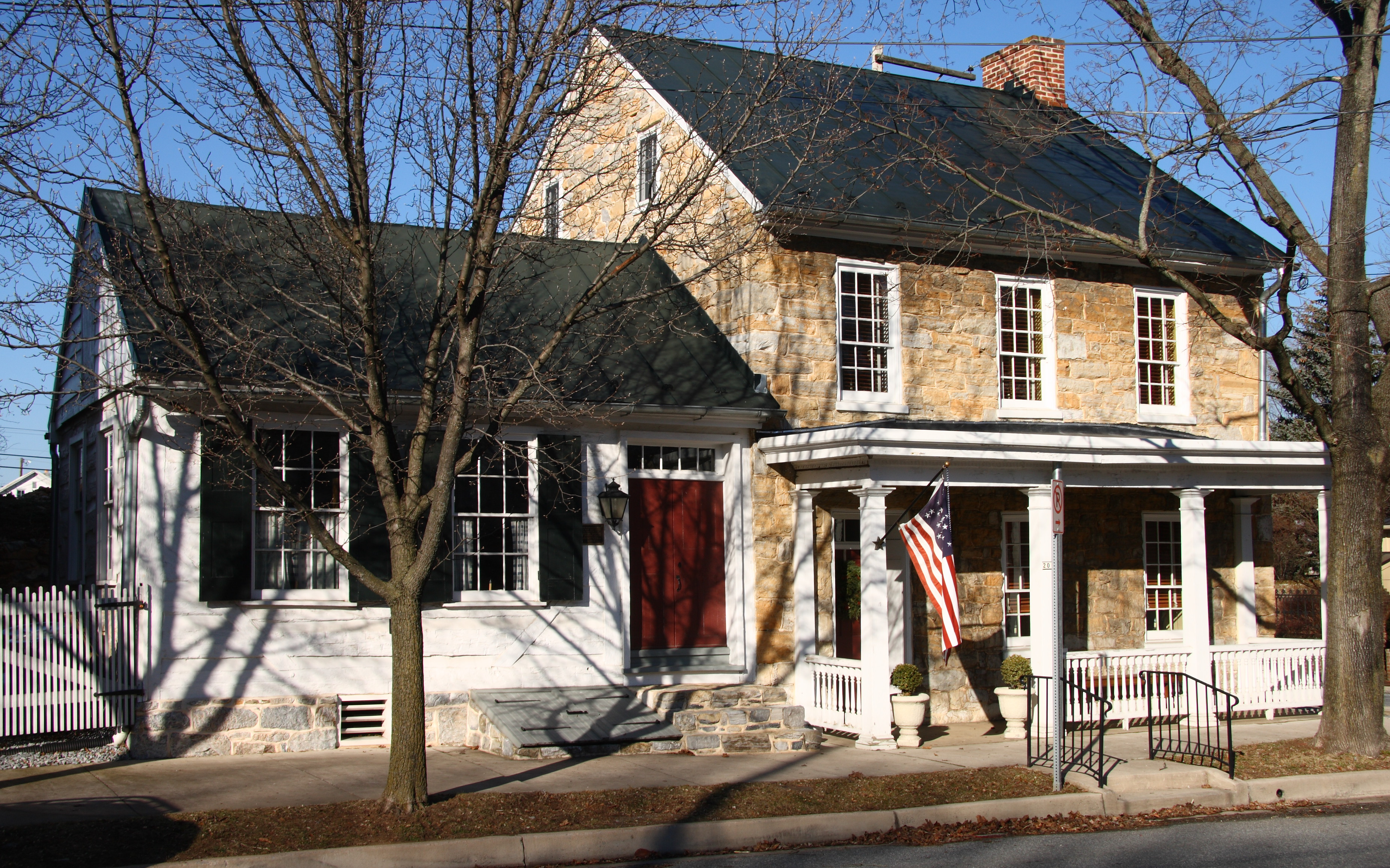

- Location within Maryland Location within the United States
- Location: 201 W. Main St., Sharpsburg, Maryland
- Coordinates: 39°27′27.24″N 77°45′05.80″W
- Area: 0.2 acres (0.081 ha)
- Built: 1832
- Architectural style: Greek Revival, Regionally distinctive limestone
- NRHP reference No.: 02001593
- Added to NRHP: December 27, 2002

The Jacob Highbarger House was built circa 1832 in Sharpsburg, Maryland, United States. The Greek Revival-influenced house is a late example of limestone construction in the Cumberland Valley of Maryland, with an attached log workshop. The log structure is an unusual example of corner-post log construction with diagonal bracing.

It was listed on the National Register of Historic Places in 2002.
