= Mount Airy (Sharpsburg, Maryland) =

Historic house in Maryland, United States

- U.S. National Register of Historic Places
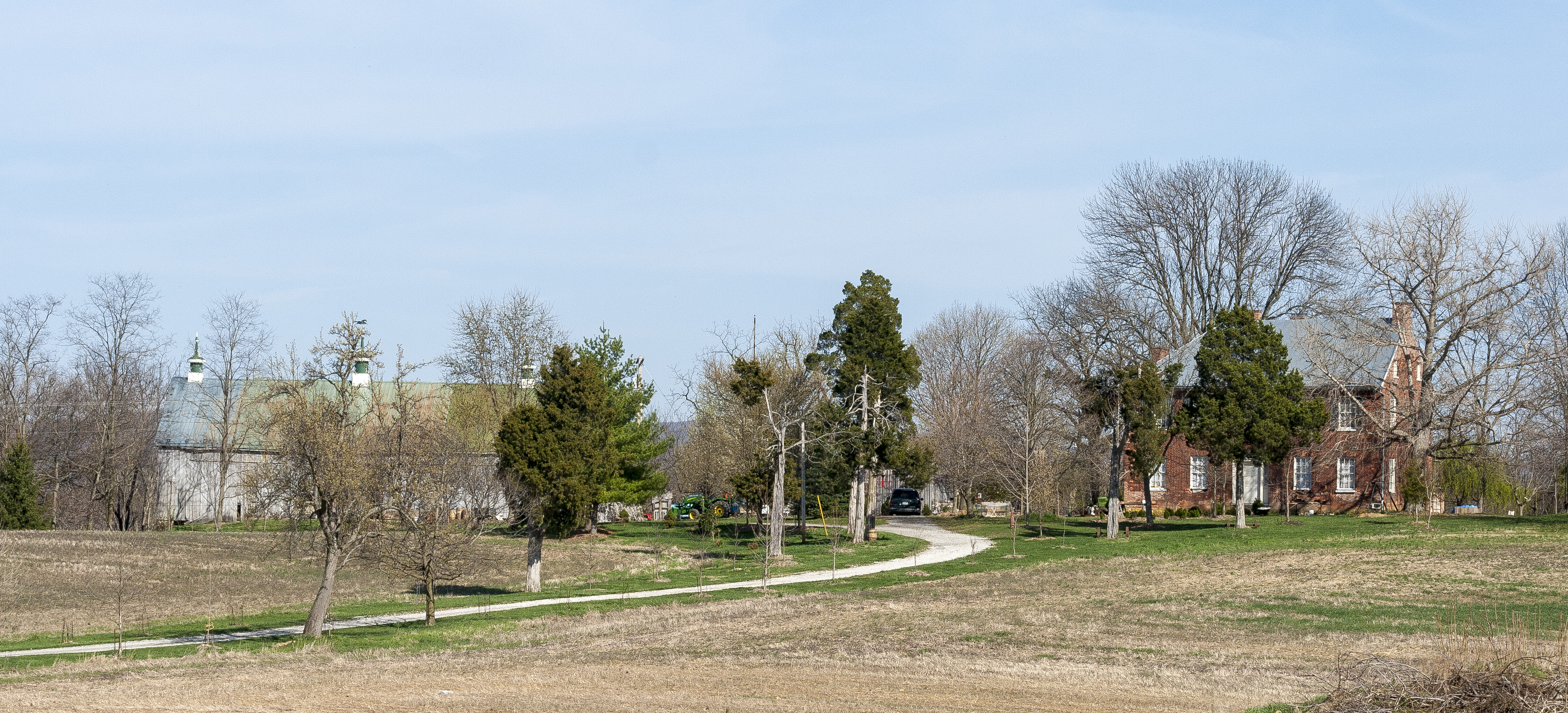

- Location within Maryland Location within the United States
- Nearest city: Sharpsburg, Maryland
- Coordinates: 39°26′55″N 77°46′4″W
- Area: 29.9 acres (12.1 ha)
- Built: 1821
- Architectural style: Federal
- NRHP reference No.: 86001550
- Added to NRHP: July 10, 1986

Mount Airy, also known as Grove Farm, is a historic home located at Sharpsburg, Washington County, Maryland, United States. It is a 2 1/2-story Flemish bond brick house, built about 1821 with elements of the Federal and Greek Revival styles. Also on the property are a probable 1820s one-story gable-roofed brick structure that has been extensively altered over time, a late-19th-century frame barn with metal roof ventilators, a 2-story frame tenant house built about 1900, and a mid-20th-century cinder block animal shed. It was used as a hospital for Confederate and Union soldiers following the Battle of Antietam. On October 3, 1862, President Abraham Lincoln and General George McClellan visited Mount Airy, an event recorded photographically by Alexander Gardner.

It was listed on the National Register of Historic Places in 1986.

== Gallery ==
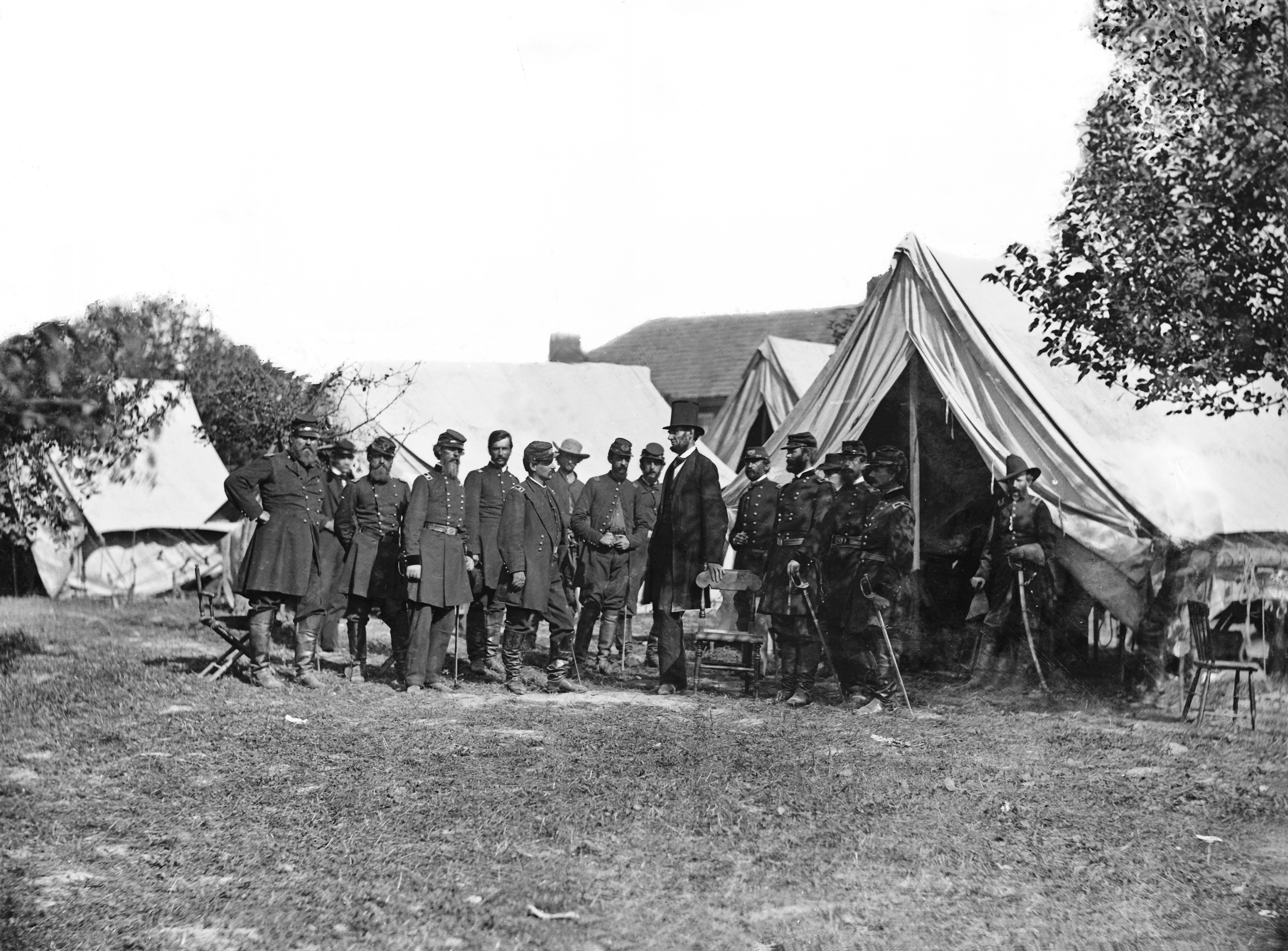
President Lincoln with Gen. George B. McClellan and group of officers at Grove Farm
