= Joseph C. Hays House =

Historic house in Maryland, United States

- U.S. National Register of Historic Places
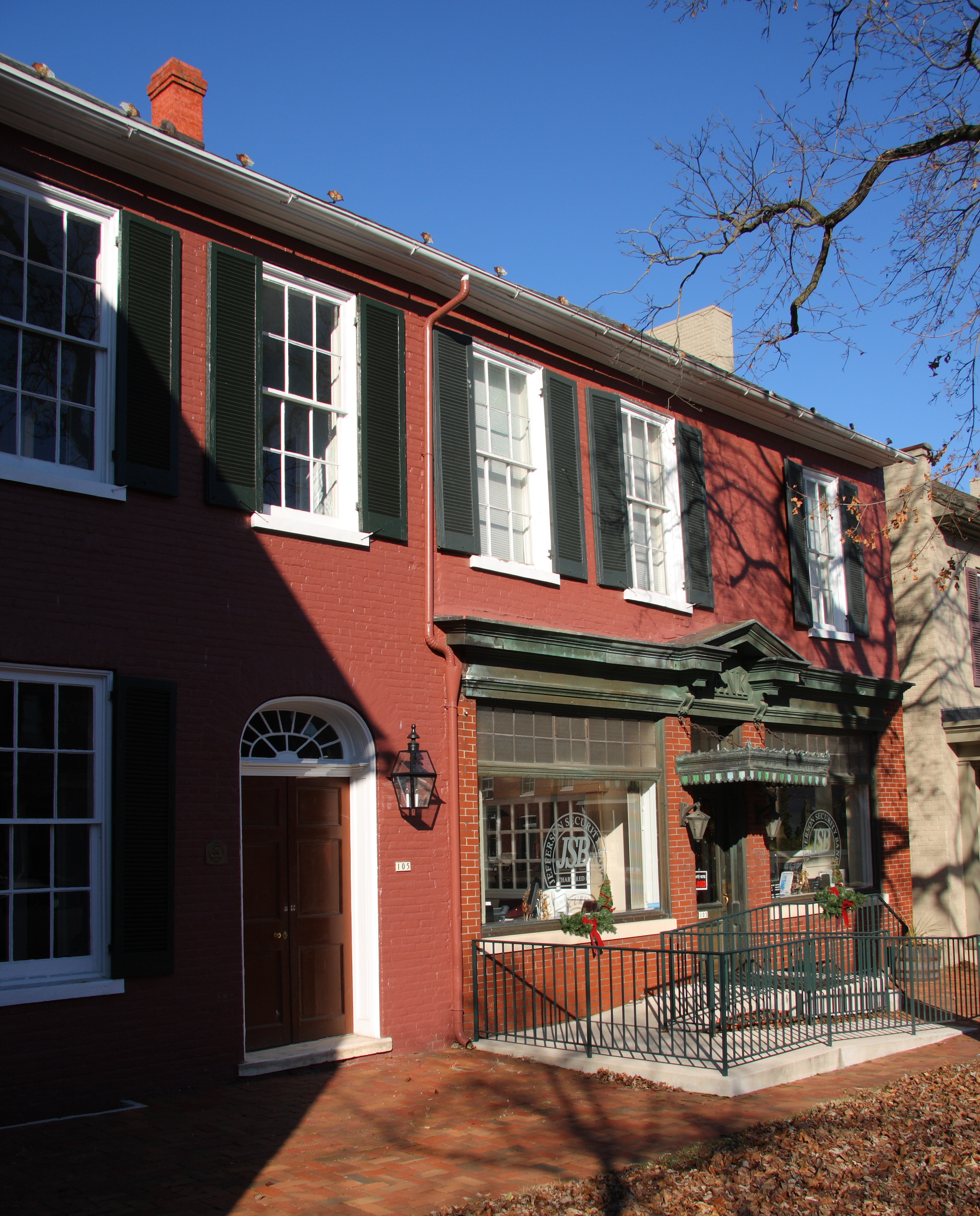
- Joseph C. Hays House, January 2009

- Location within Maryland Location within the United States
- Location: 103–105 W. Main St., Sharpsburg, Maryland
- Coordinates: 39°27′29.36″N 77°44′57.57″W
- Area: 0.3 acres (0.12 ha)
- Architectural style: Federal
- NRHP reference No.: 06001125
- Added to NRHP: December 12, 2006

The Joseph C. Hays House at 103–105 West Main Street in Sharpsburg, Maryland, United States, was originally built in 1823 as a three-bay side hall double-parlor house in the Federal style. It was soon expanded to the east with a two-bay parlor and one commercial bay. The east parlor entered commercial use during the mid-19th century as a dry goods store operated by Benjamin F. Cronise. Circa 1920 a storefront was added and a copper front was applied with BANK lettered under a central pediment, behind a marquee.

The property combines early 19th-century Federal architecture with a good example of early 20th-century commercial architectural ornament.

It was listed on the National Register of Historic Places in 2006.

== Gallery ==
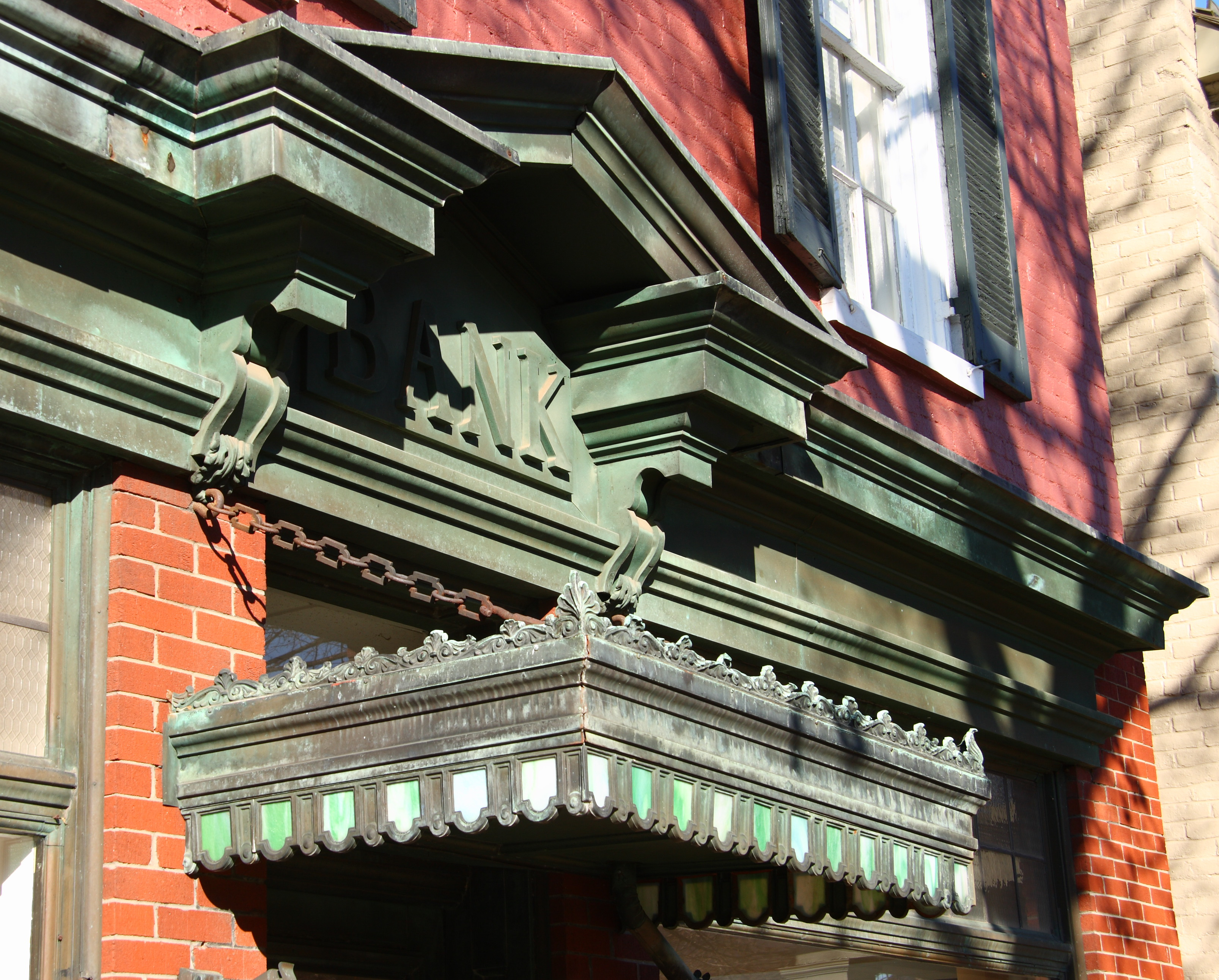
Detail of copper bank façade
