= Piper House =

Historic house in Maryland, United States

- U.S. National Register of Historic Places
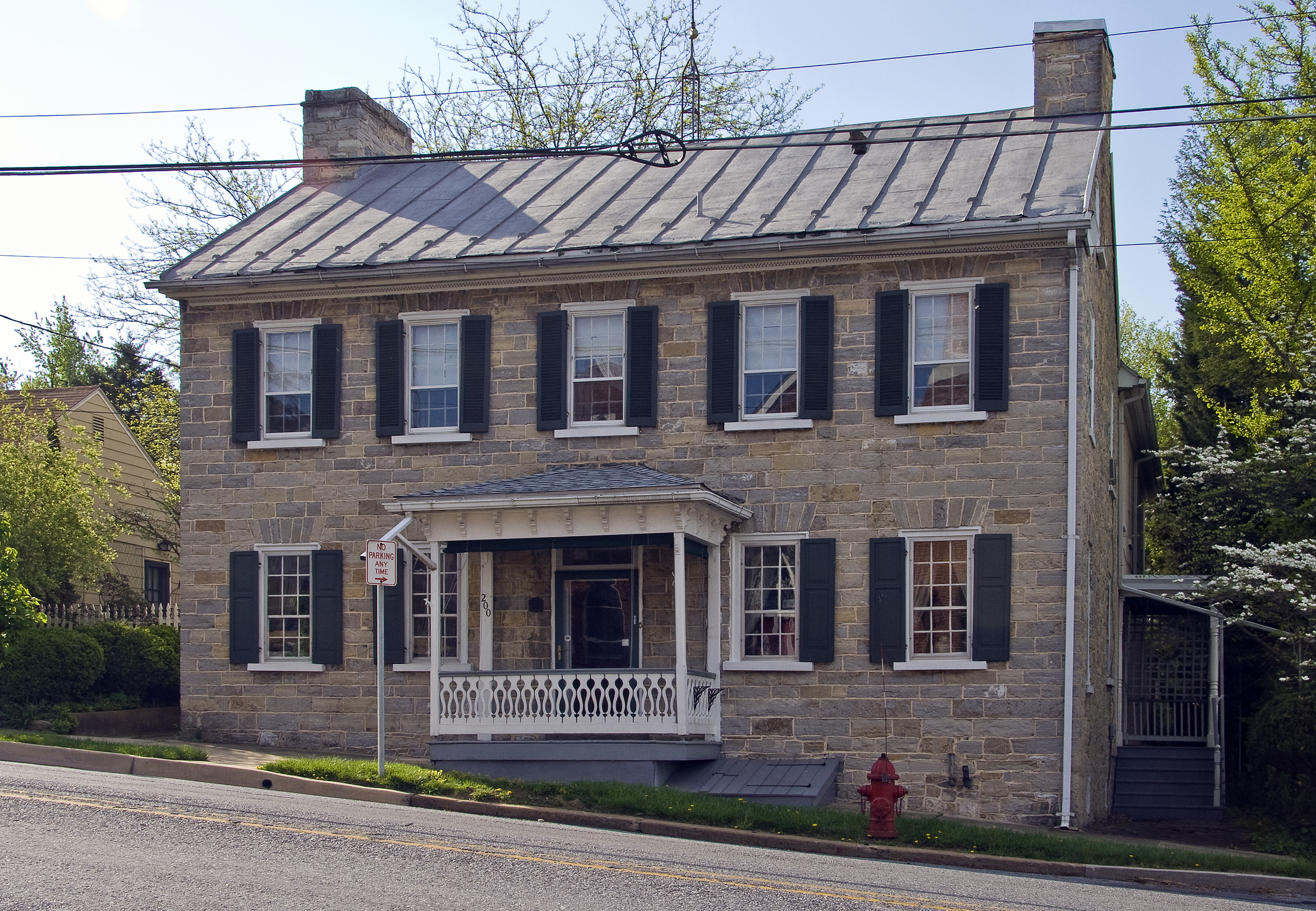

- Location within Maryland Location within the United States
- Nearest city: Sharpsburg, Maryland
- Coordinates: 39°27′31″N 77°44′45″W
- Area: less than one acre
- Built: 1792
- Architectural style: Federal
- NRHP reference No.: 99001279
- Added to NRHP: October 28, 1999

The Piper House is a historic home located at the southeast corner of Main and Church Streets in Sharpsburg, Washington County, Maryland, United States. It has a two-story limestone main block, constructed between 1792 and 1804, with a two-story brick wing, added about 1834. The house features a hip-roofed porch that shelters the main central entrance.

The Piper House was listed on the National Register of Historic Places in 1999.
