= Baker Farm (Keedysville, Maryland) =

Historic house in Maryland

- U.S. National Register of Historic Places
- Location within Maryland Location within the United States
- Location: North of Keedysville off Maryland Route 34, Keedysville, Maryland
- Coordinates: 39°29′52″N 77°41′50.6″W
- Area: 25 acres (10 ha)
- Built: 1785
- NRHP reference No.: 78001485
- Added to NRHP: October 19, 1978

Baker Farm is a historic home and farm located at Keedysville, Washington County, Maryland, United States. The house is a two-story, four-bay limestone structure with a two-story, four-bay limestone addition.

== Background ==
It was constructed during the 1780s. It has operated as a farm since the 18th century.

The Baker Farm was listed on the National Register of Historic Places in 1978.
