= Sharpsburg, Maryland =

- Town
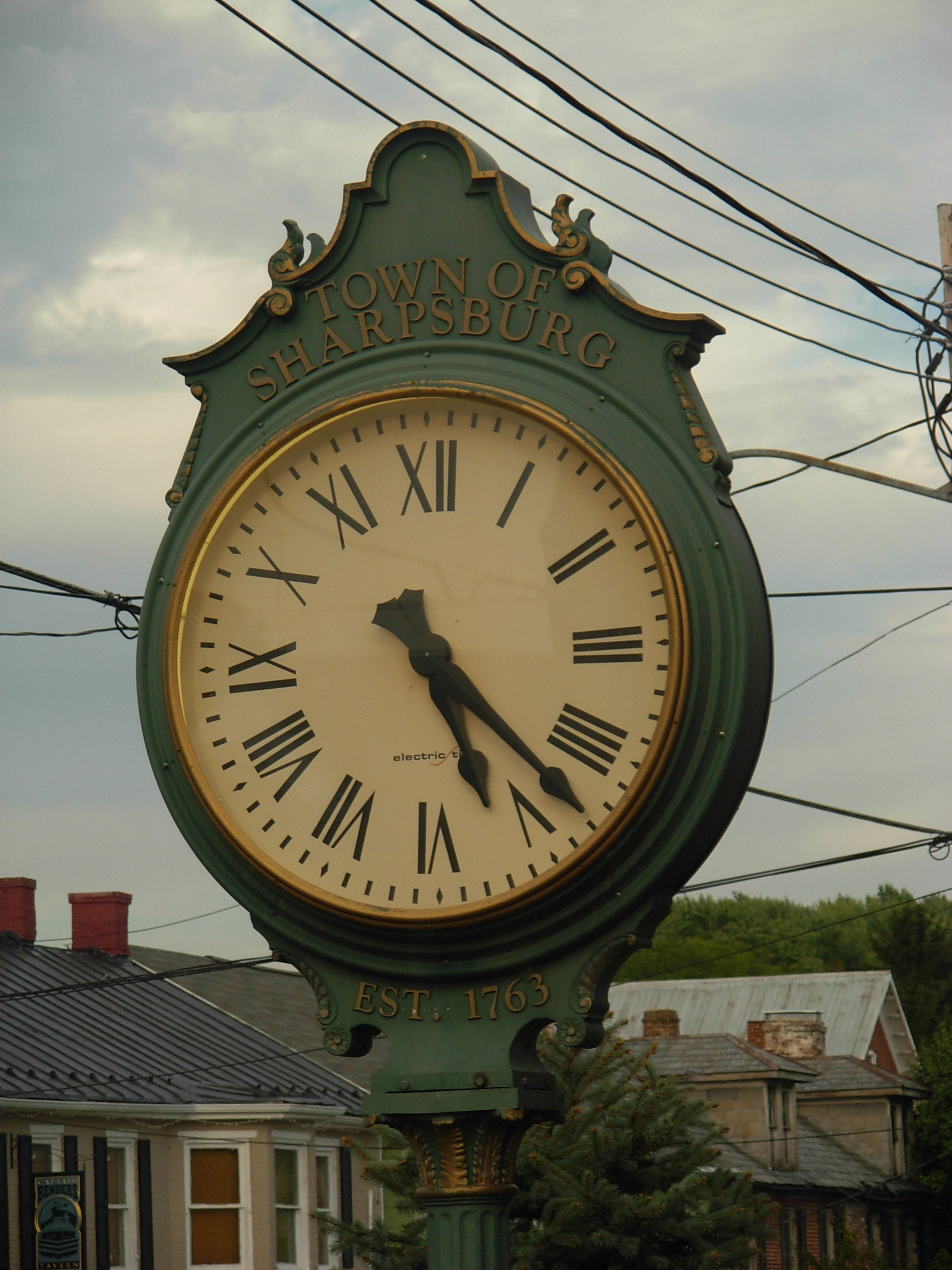
- A street clock in downtown Sharpsburg, October 2007

- Seal

- Location of Sharpsburg, Maryland
- Coordinates: 39°27′30″N 77°44′55″W
- Country: United States
- State: Maryland
- County: Washington
- Settled: 1740
- Founded: 1763
- Incorporated: 1832

Area
  - Total: 0.22 sq mi (0.56 km^{2})
  - Land: 0.22 sq mi (0.56 km^{2})
  - Water: 0 sq mi (0.00 km^{2})
- Elevation: 427 ft (130 m)

Population (2020)
  - Total: 560
  - Density: 2,594.3/sq mi (1,001.67/km^{2})
- Time zone: UTC-5 (Eastern)
  - Summer (DST): UTC-4 (EDT)
- ZIP Code: 21782
- Area codes: 301, 240
- FIPS code: 24-71600
- GNIS feature ID: 2391408
- Website: sharpsburgmd.com

Sharpsburg is a town in Washington County, Maryland, United States. The town is about 13 miles (21 km) south of Hagerstown. Its population was 560 at the 2020 census.

During the American Civil War, the Battle of Antietam—referred to as the Battle of Sharpsburg by the South—was fought on what is now Antietam National Battlefield, in the vicinity of Antietam Creek.

== History ==
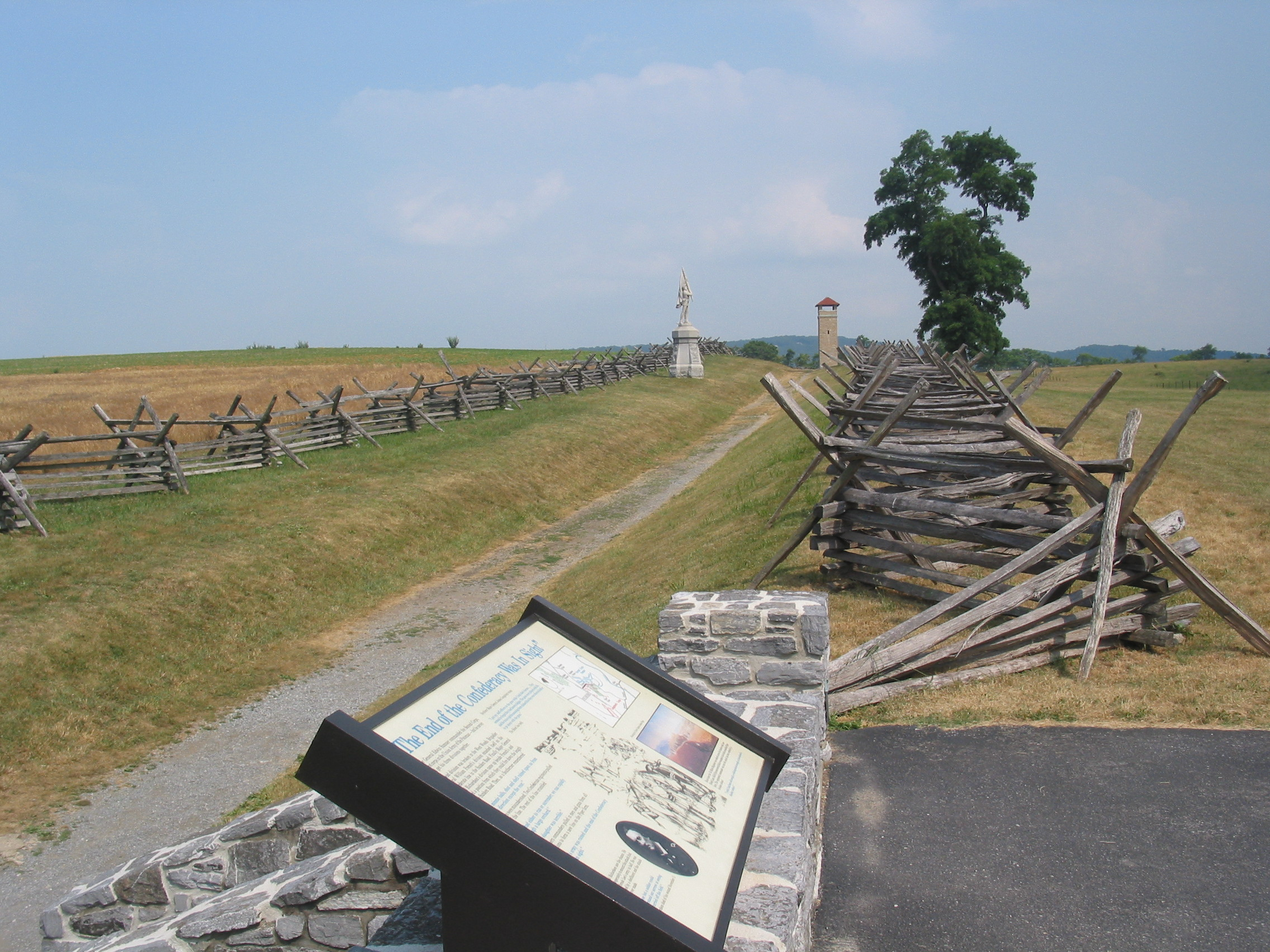
A visitor's sign at the Antietam National Battlefield near Sharpsburg, in June 2005

The first American of European descent to own land in what would become Sharpsburg was trader Edmund Cartledge. By the time Cartledge surveyed his "Hickory Tavern" land tract in 1737, the Great Philadelphia Wagon Road was established over the path that would become Sharpsburg's main street. The patent says Hickory Tavern sits between the wagon road and Garrison Spring, today's Big Spring. Thousands of immigrants used this route to travel south from Pennsylvania as far as the Carolinas.

On May 1, 1755, the road was used by Major General Edward Braddock; Horatio Sharpe, the Proprietary Governor of the Province of Maryland; and several of Braddock's staff officers to reach Winchester, Virginia, while his 48th Regiment took a longer route via today's Williamsport, Maryland. Among the officers accompanying Braddock was George Washington, then a young Virginia militia officer.

At the end of the French and Indian War in 1763, Joseph Chapline founded a town and named it for his friend Sharpe. Its original settlers were mostly of German or Swiss origin who arrived from Pennsylvania via the wagon road. They planted wheat in the region, whose farms had largely depended on tobacco.

Located east of the Potomac River, Sharpsburg was incorporated in 1832, It attracted industry in the early 19th century, especially after the Chesapeake and Ohio Canal was extended to the town in 1836.

Sharpsburg gained national recognition during the American Civil War, when Confederate General Robert E. Lee invaded Maryland with his Army of Northern Virginia in the summer of 1862 and was intercepted near the town by Union General George B. McClellan with the Army of the Potomac. The rival armies met on September 17, in the Battle of Antietam (called by the Confederates the Battle of Sharpsburg). It would be the bloodiest single day in all American military annals, with a total of nearly 23,000 casualties to both sides. A few days earlier, the multi-sited Battle of South Mountain occurred at the three low-lying passes in South Mountain—Crampton's Gap, Turner's Gap, and Fox's Gap—where Lee's forces attempted to hold back the advancing Union regiments moving westward especially along the important National Road (now U.S. Route 40 Alternate) which is now a part of South Mountain State Battlefield Park.

The drawn battle is considered a turning point of the war, since it kept the Confederacy from winning a needed victory on Northern soil, which might have gained it European recognition. Lee's retreat gave Abraham Lincoln the opportunity he needed to issue his Emancipation Proclamation, declaring all slaves residing in rebelling Confederate territory against the federal government, to be "forever free". This act made it even more unlikely that Europe would grant diplomatic recognition to the South.

In 1866, Tolson's Chapel was constructed by African Americans as a Methodist meeting place and served as a Freedmen's Bureau school. Historians since the 2000s have recovered evidence of a once vibrant "Affrilachian" community in Sharpsburg that declined during the twentieth century.

Sharpsburg claims its Memorial Day commemoration as one of the first in the U.S., having their 147th consecutive celebration in 2014.

The town core was added to the National Register of Historic Places in 2008 as the Sharpsburg Historic District. Also listed are the Antietam National Battlefield, William Chapline House, Good-Reilly House, William Hagerman Farmstead, Joseph C. Hays House, Jacob Highbarger House, Mount Airy, Piper House, Tolson's Chapel, Wilson-Miller Farm, and Woburn Manor.

The Antietam National Battlefield is an important source of local tourism and activities.

== Government ==
=== Town Council ===
Elected by voters to four-year terms:

- Russ Weaver, Mayor
- Jacob Martz, Vice Mayor
- Robbie Waters
- Joseph Kudla
- Heather Waters
- Anne-Marie McCullough

== Geography ==
According to the United States Census Bureau, the town has a total area of 0.23 square miles (0.60 km^{2}), all land.

Climate data for Sharpsburg, Maryland (1991–2020 normals, extremes 1998-present)
Month	Jan	Feb	Mar	Apr	May	Jun	Jul	Aug	Sep	Oct	Nov	Dec	Year
Record high °F (°C)	73 (23)	80 (27)	85 (29)	94 (34)	95 (35)	99 (37)	101 (38)	99 (37)	98 (37)	93 (34)	84 (29)	80 (27)	101 (38)
Mean maximum °F (°C)	65 (18)	65 (18)	76 (24)	86 (30)	89 (32)	93 (34)	95 (35)	94 (34)	91 (33)	84 (29)	75 (24)	65 (18)	96 (36)
Mean daily maximum °F (°C)	41.2 (5.1)	44.2 (6.8)	52.5 (11.4)	64.7 (18.2)	73.5 (23.1)	82.0 (27.8)	86.1 (30.1)	84.8 (29.3)	78.1 (25.6)	66.8 (19.3)	55.7 (13.2)	44.8 (7.1)	64.5 (18.1)
Daily mean °F (°C)	31.2 (−0.4)	33.6 (0.9)	40.7 (4.8)	51.7 (10.9)	61.2 (16.2)	70.1 (21.2)	74.2 (23.4)	72.9 (22.7)	65.9 (18.8)	54.4 (12.4)	43.9 (6.6)	35.1 (1.7)	52.9 (11.6)
Mean daily minimum °F (°C)	21.1 (−6.1)	23.0 (−5.0)	29.0 (−1.7)	38.6 (3.7)	48.8 (9.3)	58.2 (14.6)	62.4 (16.9)	60.9 (16.1)	53.7 (12.1)	42.0 (5.6)	32.1 (0.1)	25.3 (−3.7)	41.3 (5.2)
Mean minimum °F (°C)	4 (−16)	7 (−14)	15 (−9)	25 (−4)	34 (1)	45 (7)	52 (11)	51 (11)	41 (5)	29 (−2)	19 (−7)	11 (−12)	4 (−16)
Record low °F (°C)	−3 (−19)	−6 (−21)	−4 (−20)	19 (−7)	29 (−2)	36 (2)	46 (8)	46 (8)	33 (1)	24 (−4)	12 (−11)	0 (−18)	−6 (−21)
Average precipitation inches (mm)	3.13 (80)	2.41 (61)	3.72 (94)	3.60 (91)	4.57 (116)	4.16 (106)	4.28 (109)	3.27 (83)	4.40 (112)	3.41 (87)	3.08 (78)	3.46 (88)	43.49 (1,105)
Average snowfall inches (cm)	7.3 (19)	9.5 (24)	2.5 (6.4)	0.1 (0.25)	0 (0)	0 (0)	0 (0)	0 (0)	0 (0)	0 (0)	0.4 (1.0)	4.2 (11)	24 (61.65)
Average extreme snow depth inches (cm)	4 (10)	5 (13)	3 (7.6)	0 (0)	0 (0)	0 (0)	0 (0)	0 (0)	0 (0)	0 (0)	0 (0)	3 (7.6)	7 (18)
Average precipitation days (≥ 0.01 in)	10	9	11	12	15	11	10	11	10	11	8	9	127
Average snowy days (≥ 0.1 in)	3	3	1	0	0	0	0	0	0	0	0	2	8
Source: NOAA

== Transportation ==
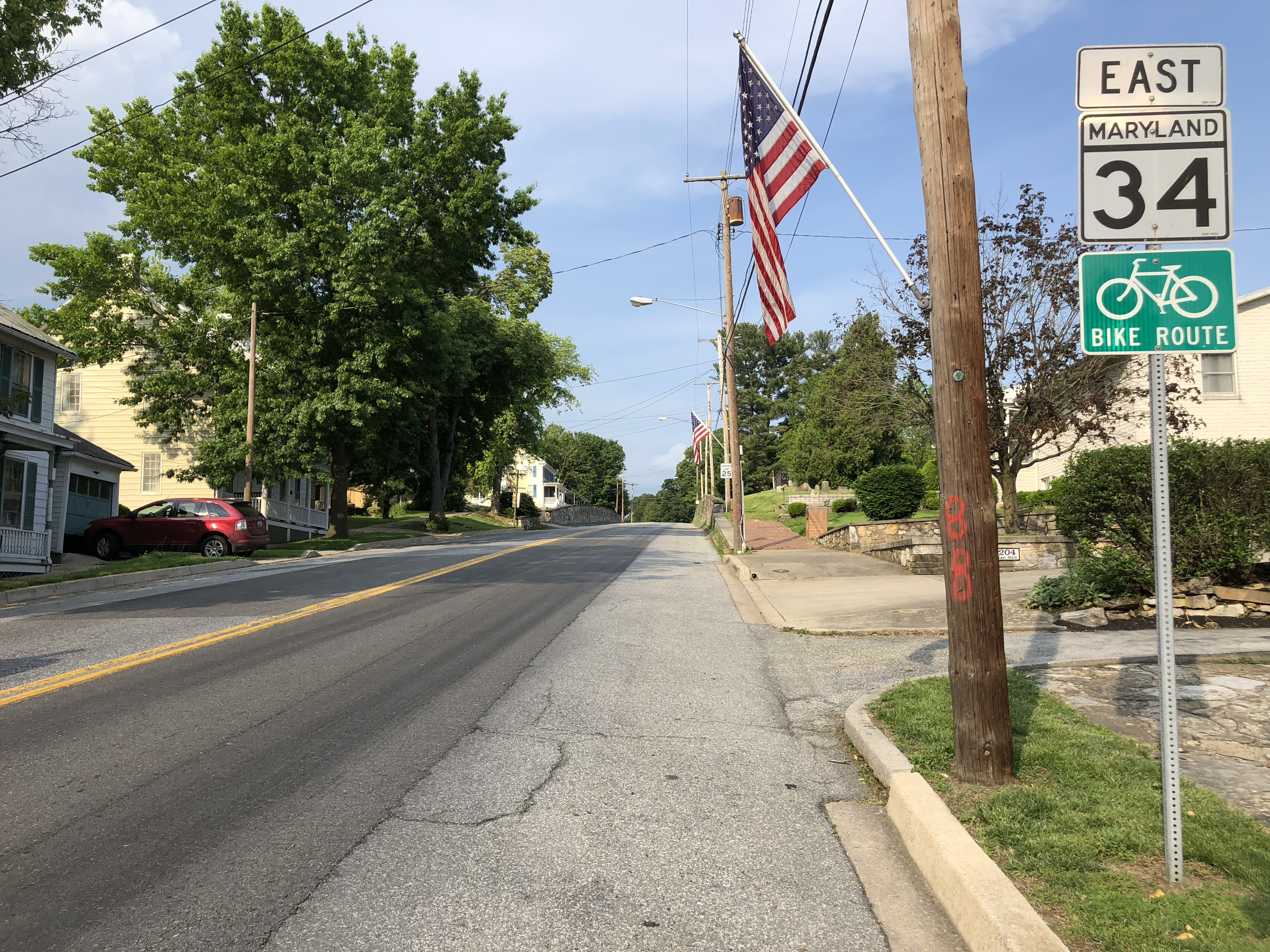
MD 34 eastbound along Main Street in Sharpsburg

The primary means of travel to and from Sharpsburg is by road. The two main highways serving the town are Maryland Route 34, which follows Main Street, and Maryland Route 65, which ends at the intersection of Main Street and Church Street. MD 34 extends eastward to Boonsboro and continues westward to the Potomac River, where it crosses into Shepherdstown, West Virginia, as West Virginia Route 480. MD 65 proceeds northward to a junction with Interstate 70 and then continues to its terminus in Hagerstown.

== Demographics ==
Historical population
Census	Pop.	Note	%±
1870	1,001		—
1880	1,260		25.9%
1890	1,163		−7.7%
1900	1,080		−7.1%
1910	960		−11.1%
1920	832		−13.3%
1930	818		−1.7%
1940	834		2.0%
1950	866		3.8%
1960	861		−0.6%
1970	833		−3.3%
1980	721		−13.4%
1990	659		−8.6%
2000	691		4.9%
2010	705		2.0%
2020	560		−20.6%
U.S. Decennial Census

=== 2010 census ===
As of the census of 2010, there were 705 people, 285 households, and 192 families living in the town. The population density was 3,065.2 inhabitants per square mile (1,183.5/km^{2}). There were 325 housing units at an average density of 1,413.0 per square mile (545.6/km^{2}). The racial makeup of the town was 95.7% White, 0.4% African American, 0.1% Native American, and 3.7% from two or more races. Hispanic or Latino of any race were 2.1% of the population.

There were 285 households, of which 28.1% had children under the age of 18 living with them, 47.7% were married couples living together, 13.0% had a female householder with no husband present, 6.7% had a male householder with no wife present, and 32.6% were non-families. 25.3% of all households were made up of individuals, and 7% had someone living alone who was 65 years of age or older. The average household size was 2.47 and the average family size was 2.92.

The median age in the town was 42.8 years. 20.3% of residents were under the age of 18; 7.3% were between the ages of 18 and 24; 26.4% were from 25 to 44; 33.2% were from 45 to 64; and 12.8% were 65 years of age or older. The gender makeup of the town was 50.9% male and 49.1% female.

=== 2000 census ===
As of the census of 2000, there were 691 people, 286 households, and 193 families living in the town. The population density was 3,119.1 inhabitants per square mile (1,204.3/km^{2}). There were 304 housing units at an average density of 1,372.2 per square mile (529.8/km^{2}). The racial makeup of the town was 97.8% White, 0.4% African American, 0.6% Asian, 0.3% Hispanic or Latino, and 1.2% from two or more races.

There were 286 households, out of which 26.6% had children under the age of 18 living with them, 54.2% were married couples living together, 9.4% had a female householder with no husband present, and 32.5% were non-families. 26.2% of all households were made up of individuals, and 8.0% had someone living alone who was 65 years of age or older. The average household size was 2.42 and the average family size was 2.90.

In the town, the population was spread out, with 21.7% under the age of 18, 8.7% from 18 to 24, 29.1% from 25 to 44, 27.6% from 45 to 64, and 12.9% who were 65 years of age or older. The median age was 38 years. For every 100 females, there were 103.2 males. For every 100 females age 18 and over, there were 101.9 males.

The median income for a household in the town was $41,786, and the median income for a family was $52,875. Males had a median income of $37,500 versus $22,000 for females. The per capita income for the town was $20,917. About 1.1% of families and 3.1% of the population were below the poverty line, including none of those under age 18 and 5.6% of those age 65 or over.

== Notable native ==
- Howell G. Crim, civil servant (White House Chief Usher, 1938–1957)
