= Good-Reilly House =

Historic house in Maryland, United States

- U.S. National Register of Historic Places
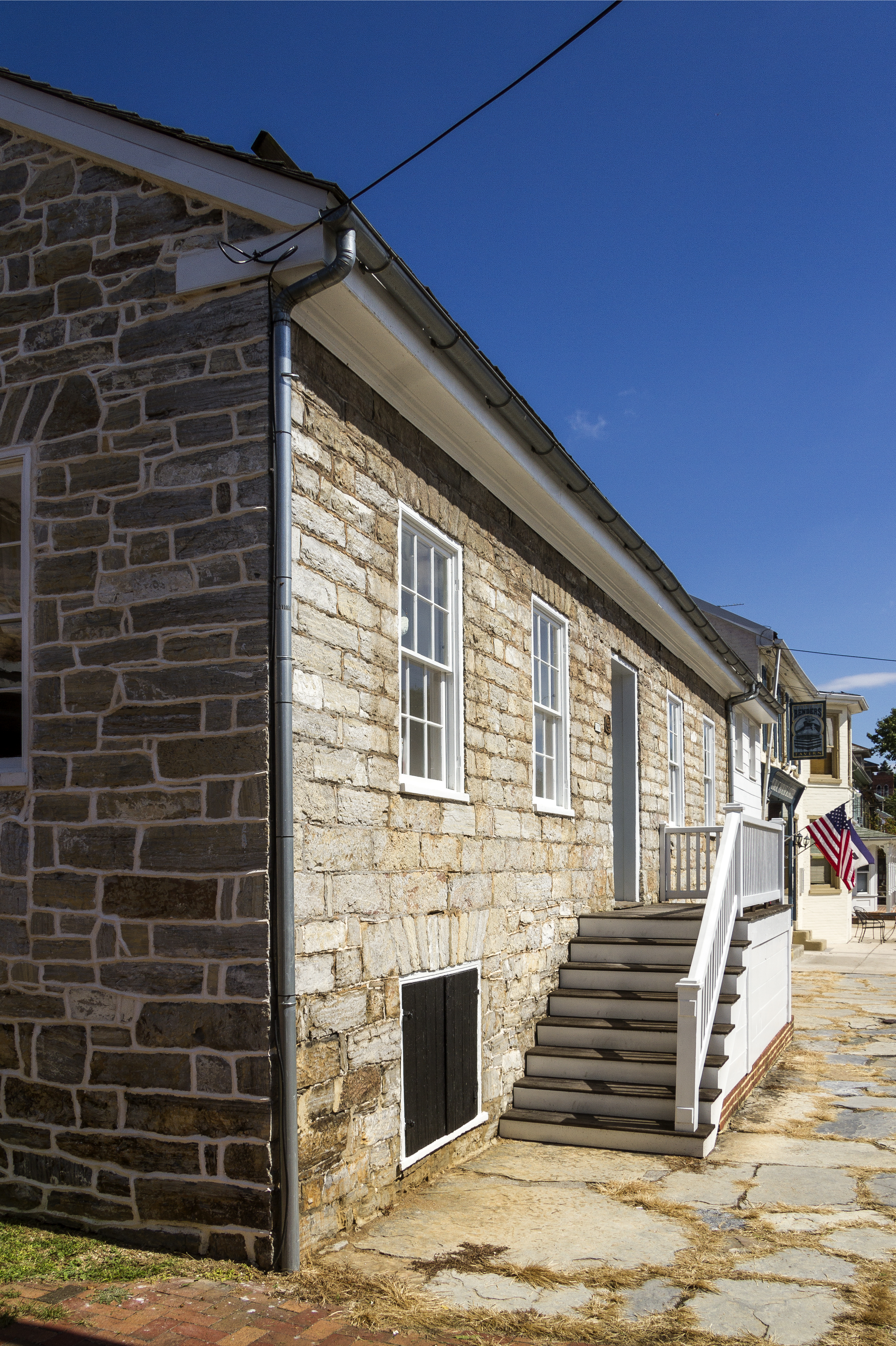
- Good-Reilly House, September 2012

- Location within Maryland Location within the United States
- Location: 107 E. Main St., Sharpsburg, Maryland
- Coordinates: 39°27′30.29″N 77°44′53.97″W
- Area: 0.1 acres (0.040 ha)
- Built: 1780
- Architectural style: Georgian
- NRHP reference No.: 02001591
- Added to NRHP: December 30, 2002

The Good-Reilly House is a historic home located at Sharpsburg, Washington County, Maryland, United States. It is located at the northeast corner of the town square and is a 1 1/2-story stone house with combined Maryland colonial and Georgian stylistic influence. The house likely dates from the 1760s, and features flush stone chimneys on each gable end.

The Good-Reilly House was listed on the National Register of Historic Places in 2002.
