= William Chapline House =

Historic house in Maryland, United States

- U.S. National Register of Historic Places
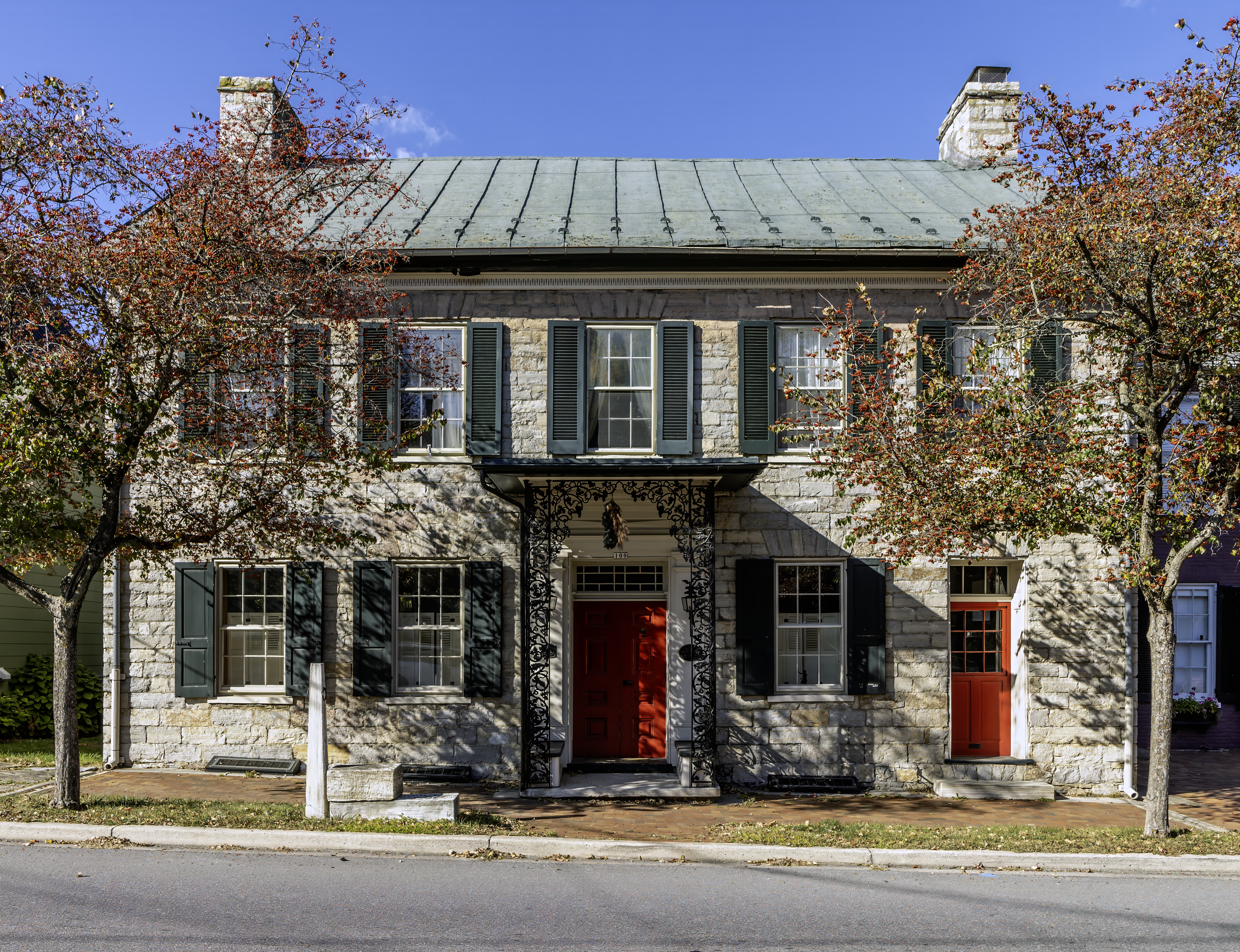
- William Chapline House in 2024

- Location within Maryland Location within the United States
- Location: 109 W. Main St., Sharpsburg, Maryland
- Coordinates: 39°27′30.61″N 77°44′53.66″W
- Area: 0.2 acres (0.081 ha)
- Built: 1790
- NRHP reference No.: 76001020
- Added to NRHP: October 8, 1976

The William Chapline House in Sharpsburg, Maryland, United States is a large stone house built about 1790. The house has shaped stonework at the front and rubble stonework on the sides with a cast-iron porch added around the turn of the twentieth century. The house was damaged during the Battle of Antietam, when it was hit with canister shot. At that time it was occupied by Dr. Augustin A. Biggs, who treated the wounded from the battle in the house.

William Chapline House was listed on the National Register of Historic Places in 1976.
