= Sharpsburg Historic District =

Historic district in Maryland, United States

- U.S. National Register of Historic Places
- U.S. Historic district
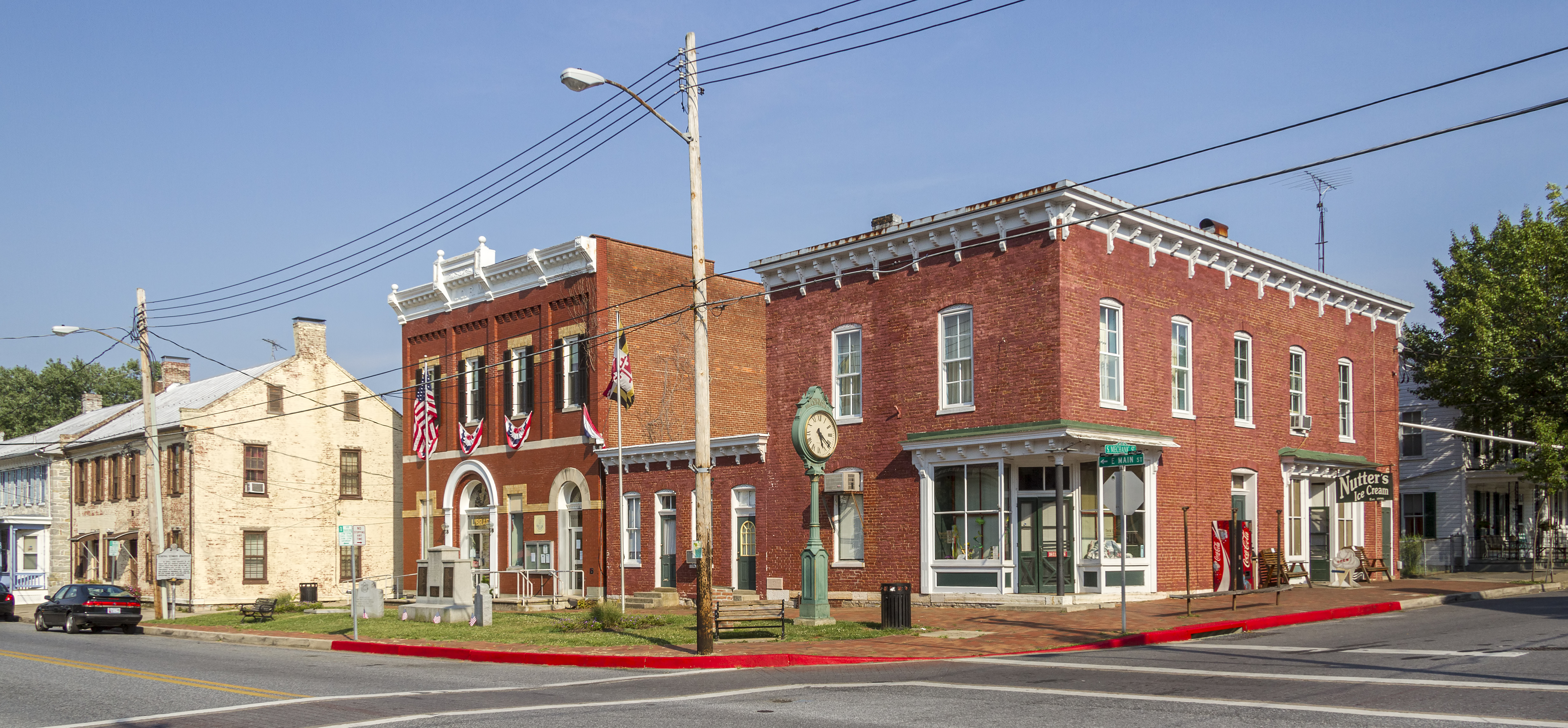
- The center of town

- Location within Maryland Location within the United States
- Location: E. and W., Chapline, Antietam, and High Sts., N. and S. Church, Mechanic, Hall, and Potomac Sts., Sharpsburg, Maryland
- Coordinates: 39°27′28″N 77°44′58″W
- Area: 134 acres (54 ha)
- Built: 1763
- Architectural style: Georgian, Federal, Gothic Revival
- NRHP reference No.: 08001218
- Added to NRHP: December 24, 2008

Sharpsburg Historic District is a national historic district located at Sharpsburg, Washington County, Maryland.

It was listed on the National Register of Historic Places in 2008.
