= Trovinger Mill =

- U.S. National Register of Historic Places
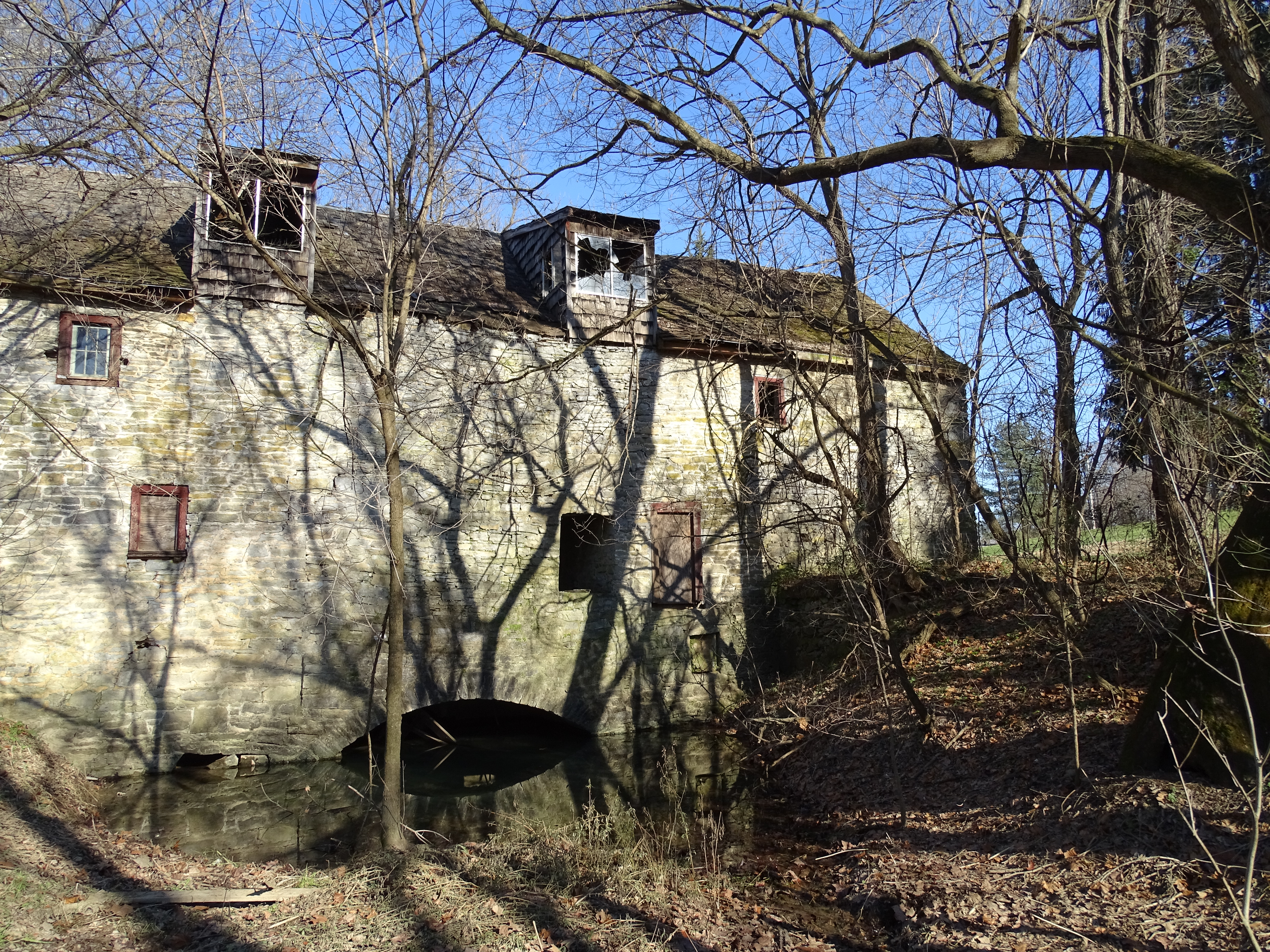
- South elevation of the mill.

- Location within Maryland Location within the United States
- Location: 3 miles (4.8 km) east of Hagerstown on Trovinger Mill Rd. and Antietam Creek, Hagerstown, Maryland
- Coordinates: 39°39′9″N 77°39′56″W
- Area: 2.2 acres (0.89 ha)
- Built: 1771
- NRHP reference No.: 75000925
- Added to NRHP: April 21, 1975

Trovinger Mill, also known as Rohrer's Mill, is a historic grist mill located in Hagerstown, Washington County, Maryland, United States. It was constructed in 1771 of roughly coursed local fieldstone. It is five bays in length with the mill race running underneath it about midway along its broad side. Nearby is the site of a newer mill, which is said to date later than the grain mill. Also present are the abutments of a bridge which crossed the Antietam at the mill as part of an 18th-century road leading from Hagerstown to the Old Forge about one and a half miles upstream. The structure contains much of the original woodwork as well as a significant part of the milling machinery.

It was listed on the National Register of Historic Places in 1975.
