= Good–Hartle Farm =

Historic farm in Maryland, US

- U.S. National Register of Historic Places
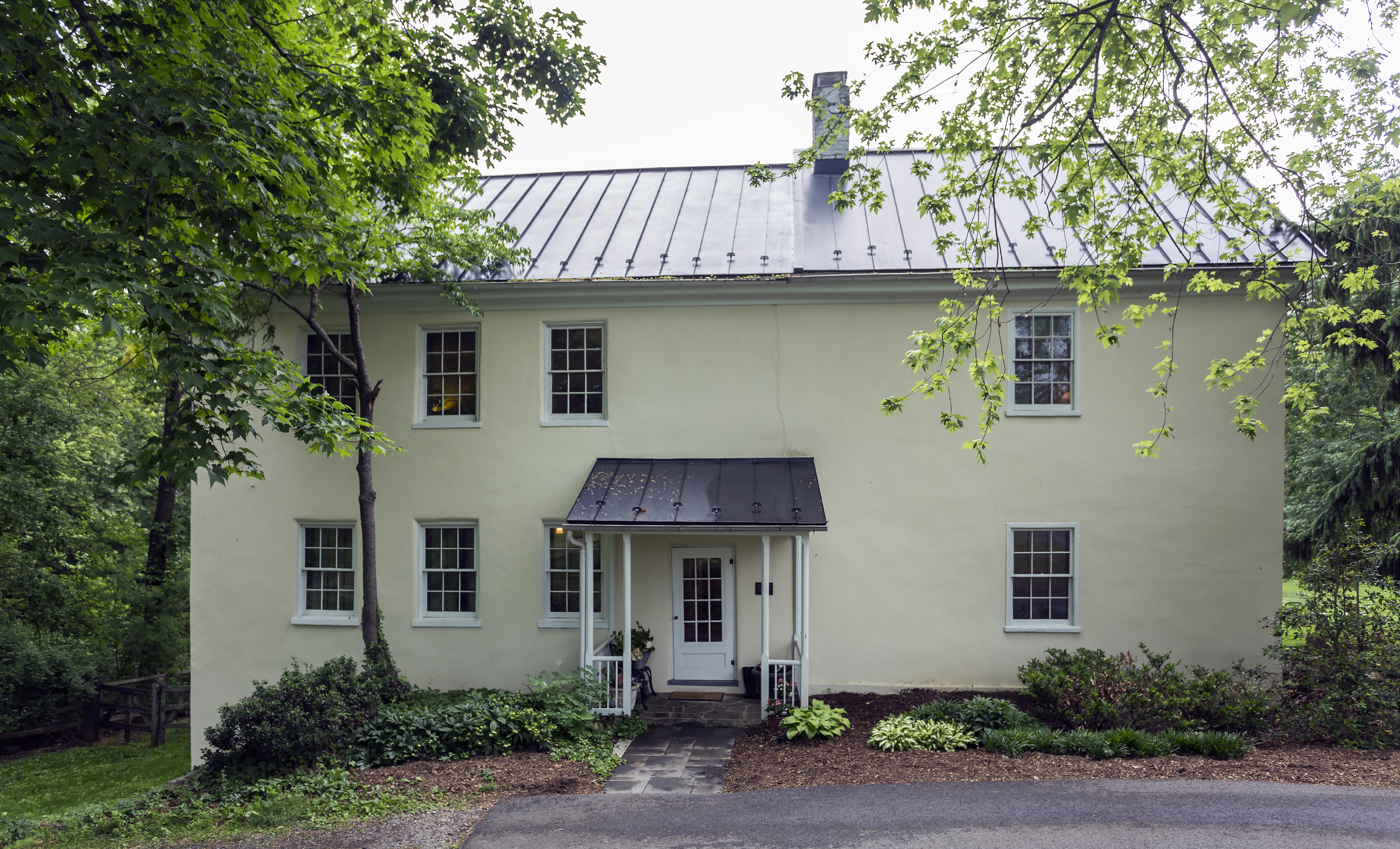

- Location within Maryland Location within the United States
- Nearest city: Hagerstown, Maryland
- Coordinates: 39°40′52″N 77°37′41″W
- Area: 10.5 acres (4.2 ha)
- Built: 1765
- Architectural style: Colonial
- NRHP reference No.: 99001543
- Added to NRHP: December 9, 1999

The Good–Hartle Farm is a historic home and farm complex located near Hagerstown, Washington County, Maryland, United States. The house is a two-part, two-story stuccoed structure, with a log section built in 1765, and 1833 limestone addition. A 1 1/2-story frame addition dates from the 20th century. Also on the property is an early-19th-century log springhouse with a cooking fireplace, and two late-19th- to early-20th-century frame outbuildings.

The Good–Hartle Farm was listed on the National Register of Historic Places in 1999.
