= Oak Hill Historic District (Hagerstown, Maryland) =

Historic district in Maryland, United States

- U.S. National Register of Historic Places
- U.S. Historic district
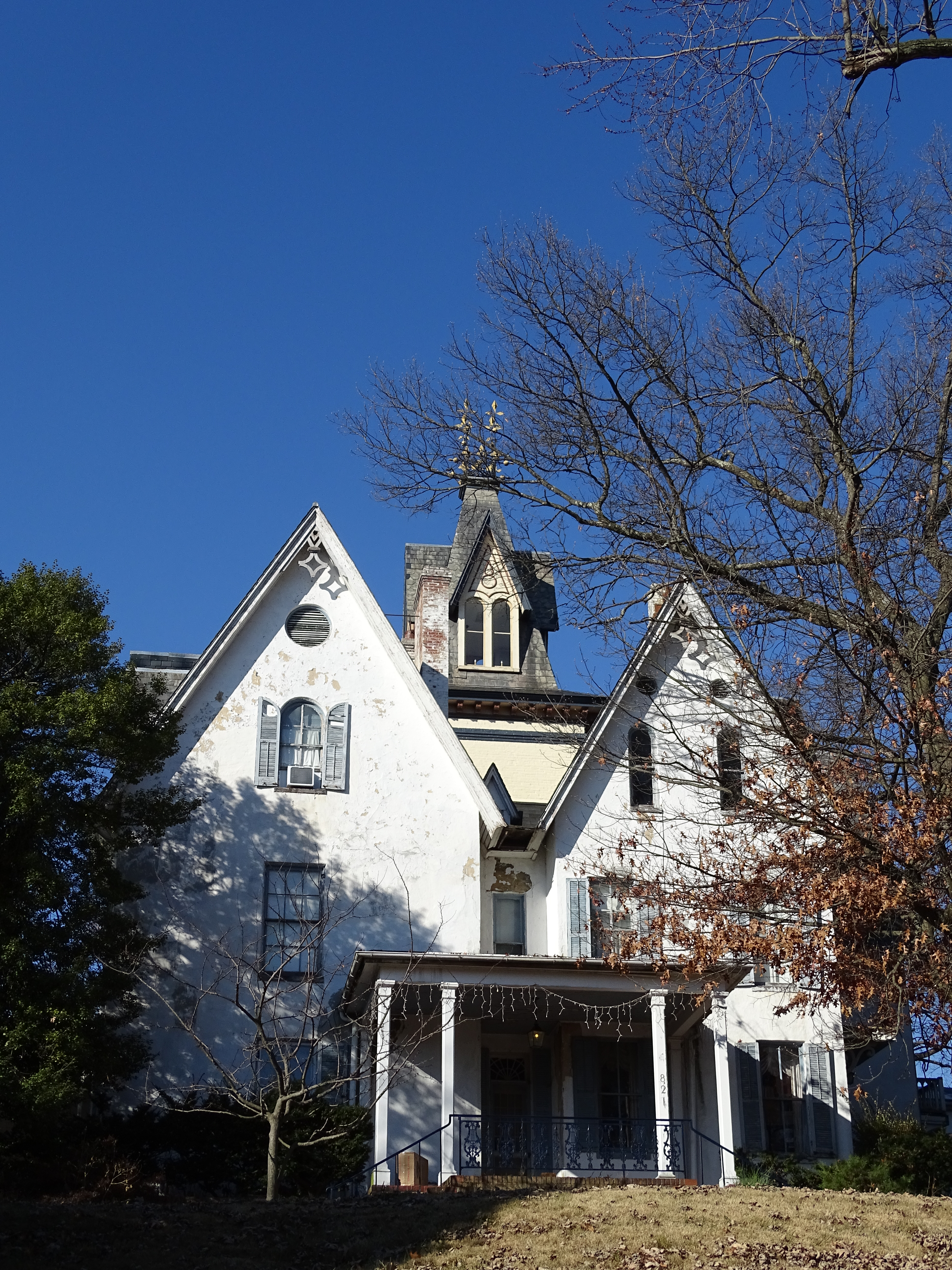

- Location within Maryland Location within the United States
- Location: Roughly bounded by W. Irvin, Potomac, and Prospect Aves. and Forest Dr., Hagerstown, Maryland
- Coordinates: 39°39′18″N 77°42′38″W
- Area: 76 acres (31 ha)
- Architect: Multiple
- Architectural style: Late 19th And 20th Century Revivals, Late 19th And Early 20th Century American Movements
- NRHP reference No.: 87001574
- Added to NRHP: September 18, 1987

Oak Hill Historic District is a national historic district at Hagerstown, Washington County, Maryland, United States. The district consists of a residential neighborhood of approximately 76 acres (310,000 m^{2}) in northern Hagerstown. It is characterized generally by large scale houses built in the first third of the 20th century and standing in a garden city type setting. The houses are generally Colonial or Georgian revival in stylistic influences.

It was added to the National Register of Historic Places in 1987.
