= Valentia (Hagerstown, Maryland) =

Historic house in Maryland, United States

- U.S. National Register of Historic Places
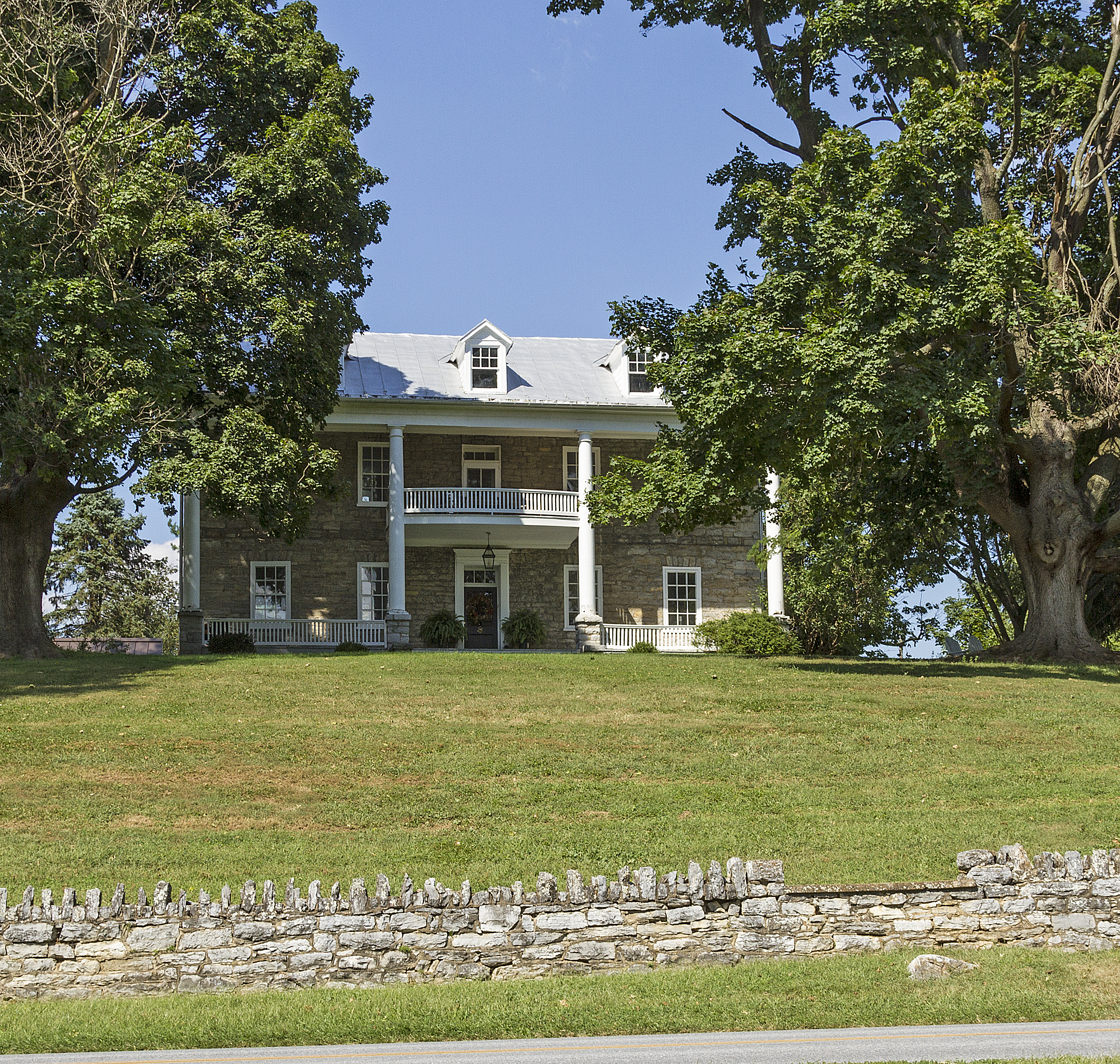

- Location within Maryland Location within the United States
- Location: South of Hagerstown on Poffenberger Rd. off Maryland Route 65, Hagerstown, Maryland
- Coordinates: 39°35′42″N 77°42′41″W
- Area: 13 acres (5.3 ha)
- Built by: Clagett, John
- NRHP reference No.: 74000975
- Added to NRHP: June 27, 1974

Valentia is a historic home located at Hagerstown, Washington County, Maryland, United States. It is a large 2 1/2-story L-shaped stone farmhouse, facing south overlooking Antietam Creek. The house features a flat-roofed, one-story porch covers the south door and flanking windows and is supported by four Doric columns resting on stone piers. Also on the property is a small tenant house and Miller's House, constructed of the same stone as the main house.

It was listed on the National Register of Historic Places in 1974.
