= Hagerstown Armory =

Historic building in Maryland, US

- U.S. National Register of Historic Places
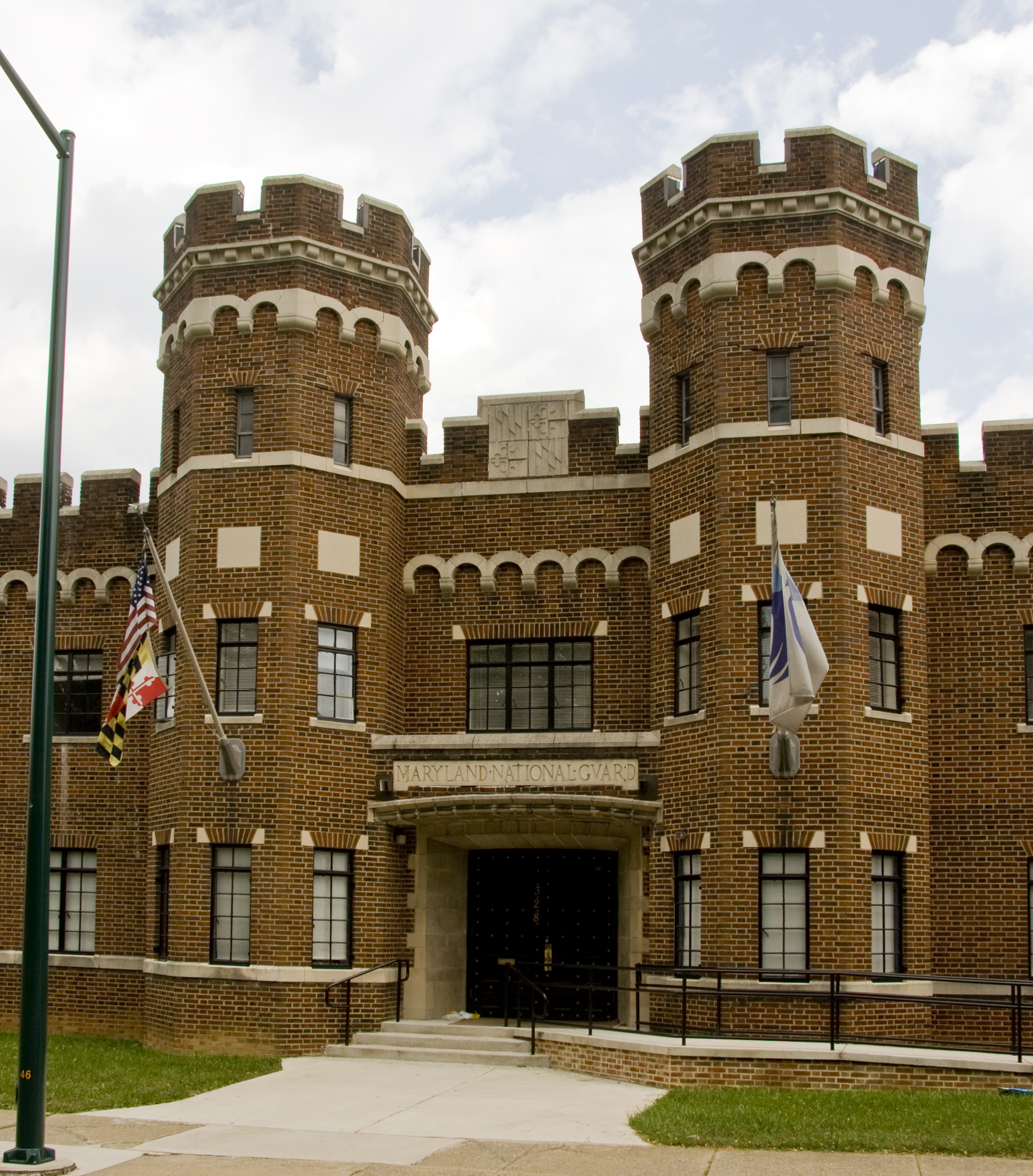

- Location within Maryland Location within the United States
- Location: 328 N. Potomac St., Hagerstown, Maryland
- Coordinates: 39°38′47.3″N 77°42′59.5″W
- Area: 0.5 acres (0.20 ha)
- Built: 1926
- Architectural style: Medieval
- MPS: Maryland National Guard Armories TR
- NRHP reference No.: 85002673
- Added to NRHP: September 25, 1985

Hagerstown Armory is a historic armory located at 328 N. Potomac Street in Hagerstown, Washington County, Maryland, United States. It is a two-story Flemish bond brick structure with full basement emulating a medieval fortification, built in 1926. The front facade features a central block offset by two, three-story towers. Tower tops are characterized by a ring of scalloped stone molding, surmounted by a ring of brick dentils, and topped by two crenelles per side with stone caps. The center section is topped by two crenelles with stone caps with stone tablet bearing the seal of the State of Maryland centered between them.

It was listed on the National Register of Historic Places in 1985.

An article in the July 17, 2009 Hagerstown Herald-Mail announced that the building may soon be sold and transformed into a mental health center.
