= Lantz-Zeigler House =

Historic house in Maryland, United States

- Lantz--Zeigler House
- U.S. National Register of Historic Places
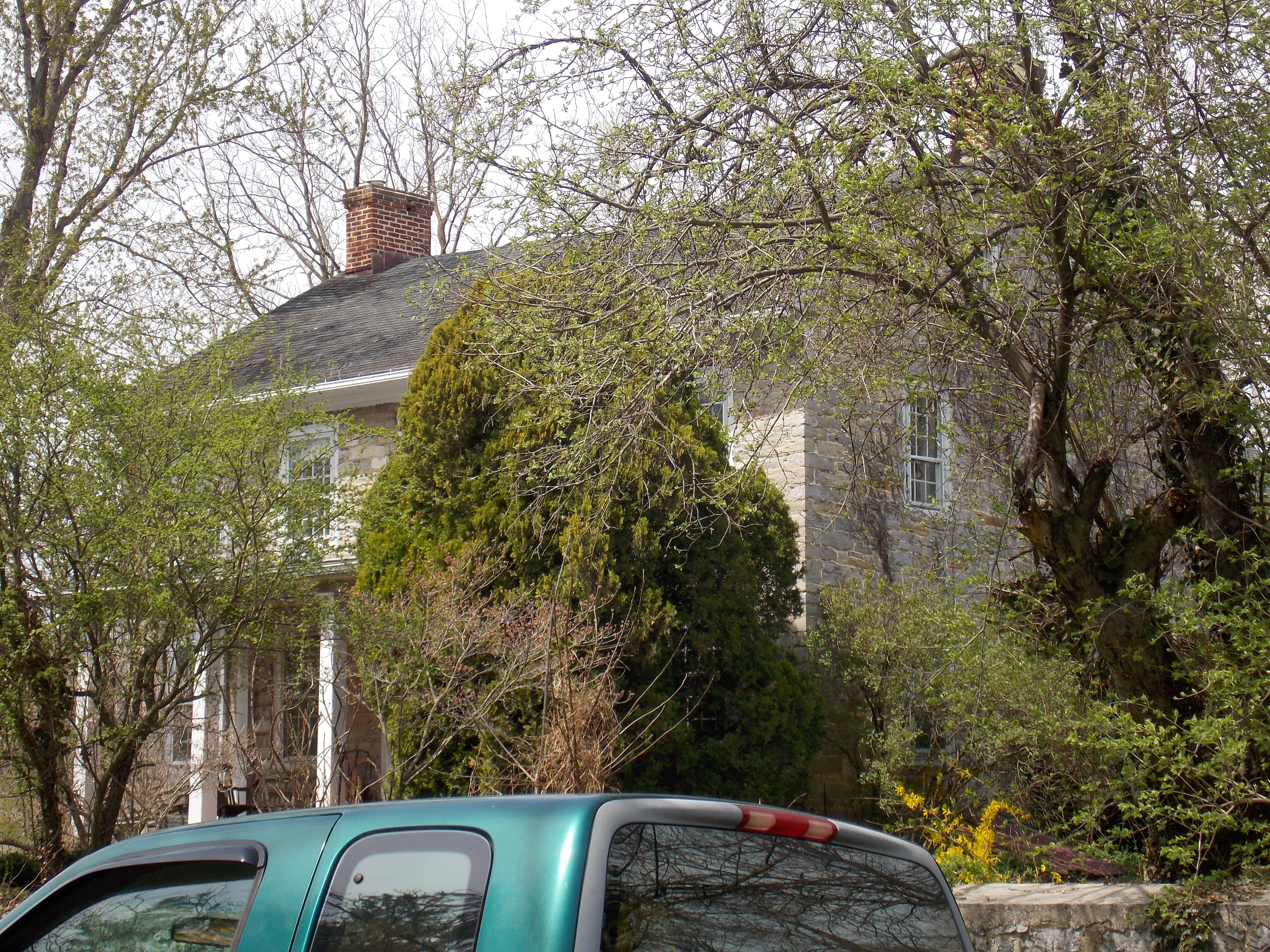

- Location within Maryland Location within the United States
- Location: 21000 Leitersburg Pike, Hagerstown, Maryland
- Coordinates: 39°41′20″N 77°38′17″W
- Area: 12.7 acres (5.1 ha)
- Built: 1800
- Architectural style: Colonial Revival
- NRHP reference No.: 98001231
- Added to NRHP: October 8, 1998

The Lantz-Zeigler House is a historic home located at Hagerstown, Washington County, Maryland, United States. The house consists of a two-story stone main section built in 1800 with a two-story perpendicular ell to the rear. Also on the property are a stone outbuilding, a horse barn, and the site of a stone bridge built in 1824.

The Lantz-Zeigler House was listed on the National Register of Historic Places in 1998.
