= Fairgrounds Park =

Park in Hagerstown, Maryland

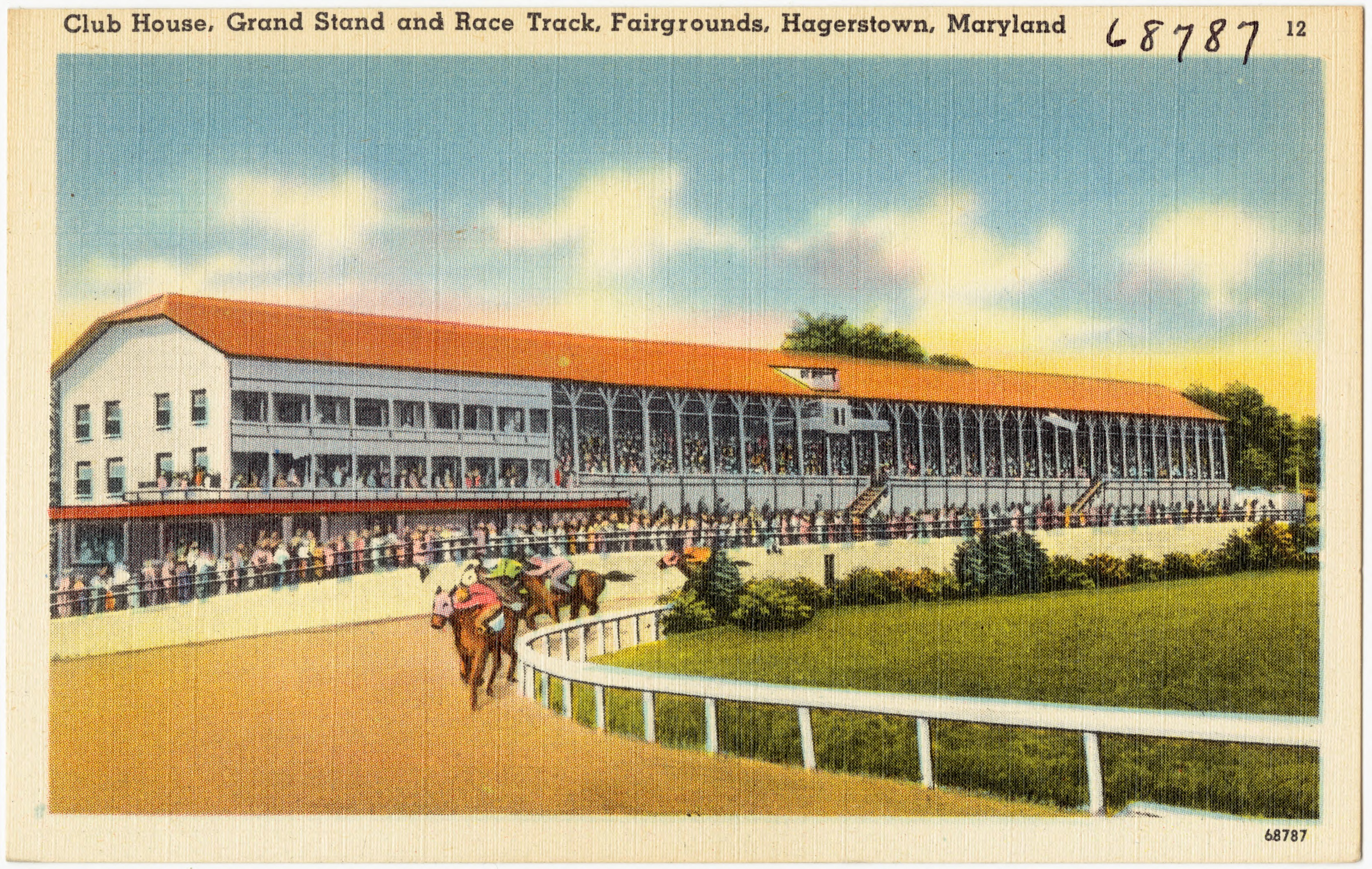
- Racetrack at the Hagerstown Fairgrounds
- Interactive map of Fairgrounds Park
- Type: Urban park
- Location: Hagerstown, Maryland, United States
- Coordinates: 39.64522°N 77.7067843°W
- Area: 60 acres (24 ha)
- Opened: 1852 (as Hagerstown Fairgrounds)
- Operator: Hagerstown Parks & Recreation
- Status: Open
- Hiking trails: Fairgrounds Park Walking Trail, Hamilton Run Trail

Fairgrounds Park is an open land urban park restored from fairgrounds located off Cleveland Avenue in Hagerstown, Maryland, United States.

== History ==
Fairgrounds Park was once called Hagerstown Fairgrounds which operated from 1852 to 1980. These events were served by Hagerstown and Frederick Railway's local city lines, which bought thousands of people to the grounds.

The site still features the large grandstand seating facility used during the fairgrounds' heyday especially when the Great Hagerstown Fair, a once popular agricultural showcase event, opened each year.

== Attractions ==
The park is home to Hagerstown BMX, a biking track, Hagerstown Ice & Sports Complex, a public indoor ice skating complex, and Fairground Softball Association who play at softball fields on the premises. Fairgrounds Park also features walking trails.

== Events ==
The park also features several events throughout the year such as yearly fireworks display held around the American Independence Day (4 July) and the annual Hagerstown Hispanic Festival that celebrates the heritage of the fastest growing segment of Hagerstown and surrounding Washington County's population. Fairgrounds Park is also home to the Fairgrounds 5K that features a 5,000 meter race or 1 or 2 mile walk.
