= Rockledge (Hagerstown, Maryland) =

Historic house in Maryland, United States

- U.S. National Register of Historic Places
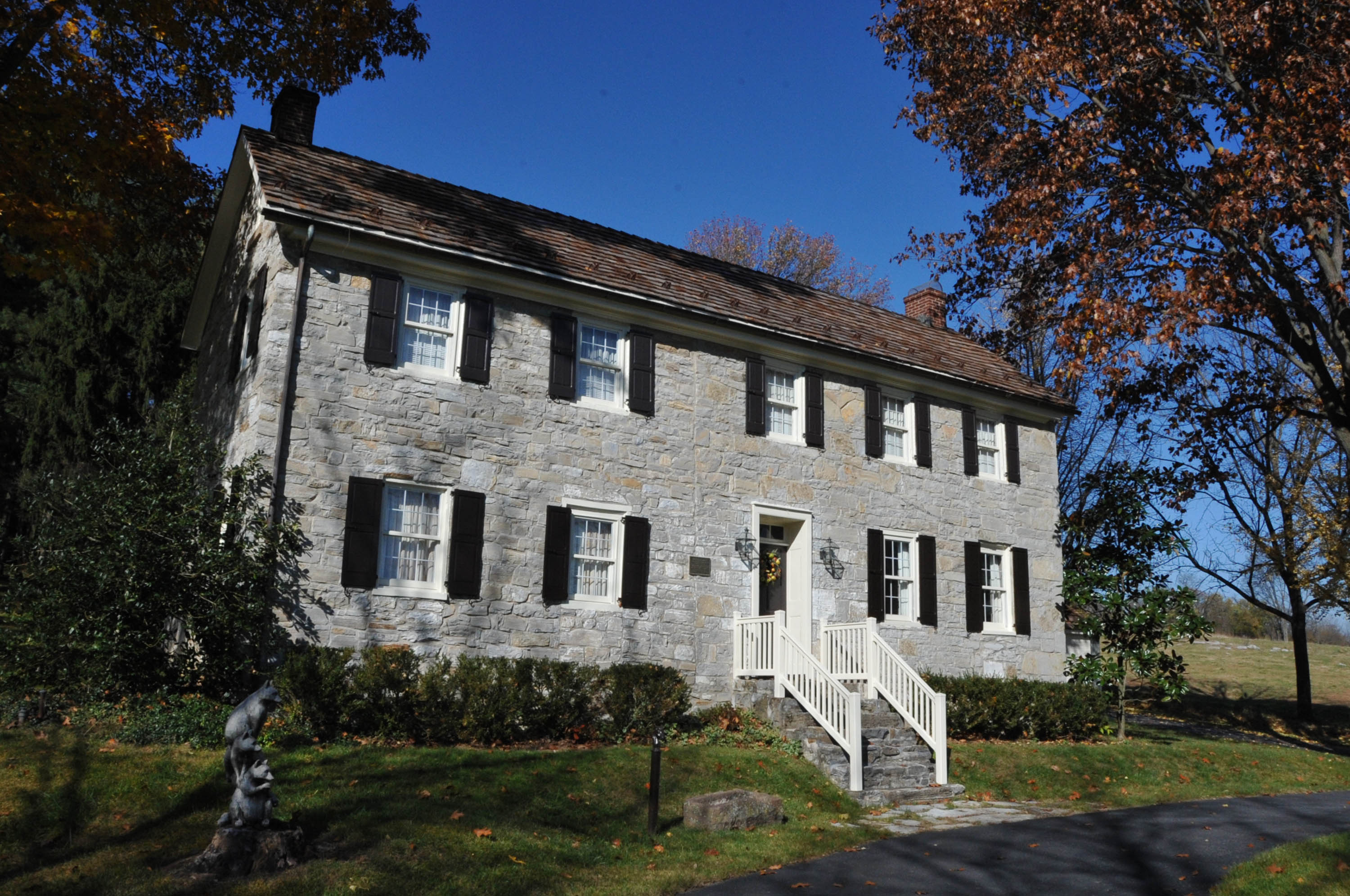

- Location within Maryland Location within the United States
- Location: 13535 Foxfire Ln., Hagerstown, Maryland
- Coordinates: 39°41′20″N 77°36′45″W
- Area: 4.3 acres (1.7 ha)
- Architectural style: Federal
- NRHP reference No.: 03001292
- Added to NRHP: December 18, 2003

Rockledge is a historic home located at Hagerstown, Washington County, Maryland, United States. It is a two-story limestone farmhouse located on a hill overlooking Little Antietam Creek. It was built in three stages, beginning in the early 19th century. Also on the property is a small brick smokehouse with a pyramidal roof, a stone springhouse.

It was listed on the National Register of Historic Places in 2003.
