= Potomac–Broadway Historic District =

Historic district in Maryland, United States

- U.S. National Register of Historic Places
- U.S. Historic district
- Location within Maryland Location within the United States
- Location: Roughly, Potomac St. & Oak Hill Ave. from Franklin St. to Maple Ave. & North Ave. & Broadway from Park Pl. to Mulberry, Hagerstown, Maryland
- Coordinates: 39°38′54″N 77°42′53″W
- Area: 68 acres (28 ha)
- Architectural style: Late Victorian, Georgian, Federal
- NRHP reference No.: 90001804
- Added to NRHP: December 12, 1990

Potomac–Broadway Historic District is a national historic district at Hagerstown, Washington County, Maryland, United States. The district is located in the north downtown area and consists largely of a late 19th and early 20th century residential area with most buildings dating from 1870 to 1930. Architectural styles represented include Victorian Gothic, Queen Anne, Colonial Revival, and American Foursquare.

It was added to the National Register of Historic Places in 1990.
