= Antietam Furnace Complex Archeological Site =

- U.S. National Register of Historic Places
- Nearest city: Hagerstown, Maryland
- Built: 1768
- NRHP reference No.: 83002963
- Added to NRHP: August 25, 1983

The Antietam Furnace Complex Archeological Site is an archeological site at Hagerstown, Washington County, Maryland. It is an eighteenth-century Iron furnace located along South Mountain. It operated circa 1768-1775 and produced pig iron, stoves, domestic iron wares, and possibly cannon. It was probably the earliest iron furnace in the present day Washington County.

It was listed on the National Register of Historic Places in 1983.
