= Hagerstown Historic District =

Historic district in Maryland, United States

- U.S. National Register of Historic Places
- U.S. Historic district
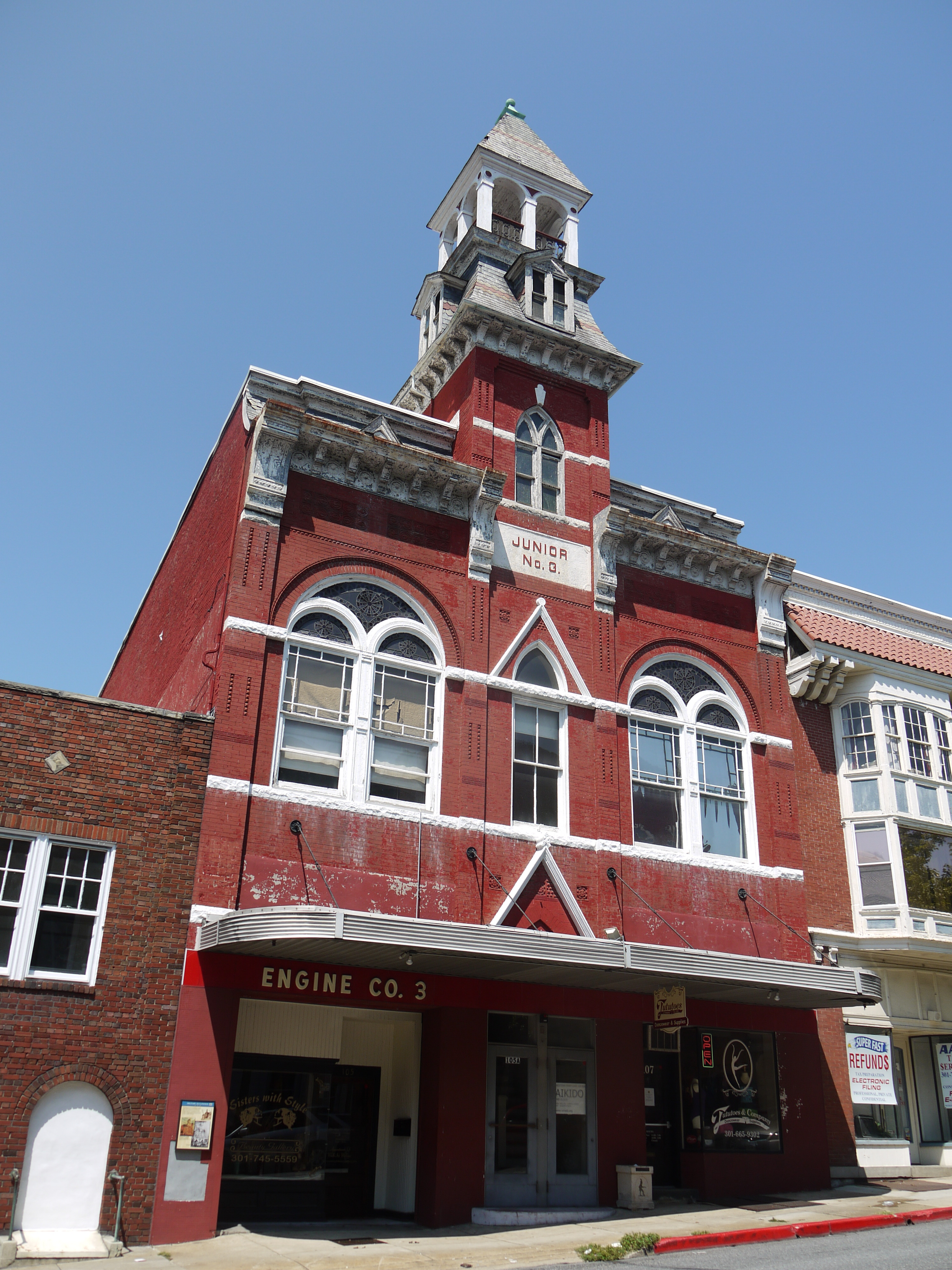
- Former fire hall in the district in 2011

- Location within Maryland Location within the United States
- Location: Roughly bounded by Prospect and Canon Aves., Memorial Blvd. and the CSX RR tracks., Hagerstown, Maryland
- Coordinates: 39°38′23″N 77°43′6″W
- Area: 425 acres (172 ha)
- Built: 1770
- Architect: Sims and Sims
- Architectural style: Italianate, Federal, Georgian Revival
- NRHP reference No.: 93001551
- Added to NRHP: February 2, 1994

Hagerstown Historic District is a national historic district at Hagerstown, Washington County, Maryland, United States. The district contains the downtown commercial and governmental center as well as several surrounding urban residential neighborhoods and industrial areas. It includes the original plat of Hagerstown, laid out in the 1760s, as well as areas of expansion that developed generally prior to or just after the turn of the 20th century. Some 2,500 Confederate dead lie in Rose Hill Cemetery on South Potomac Street, most of whom died at the Battle of Antietam.

It was added to the National Register of Historic Places in 1994.
