= Garden Hill =

- U.S. National Register of Historic Places
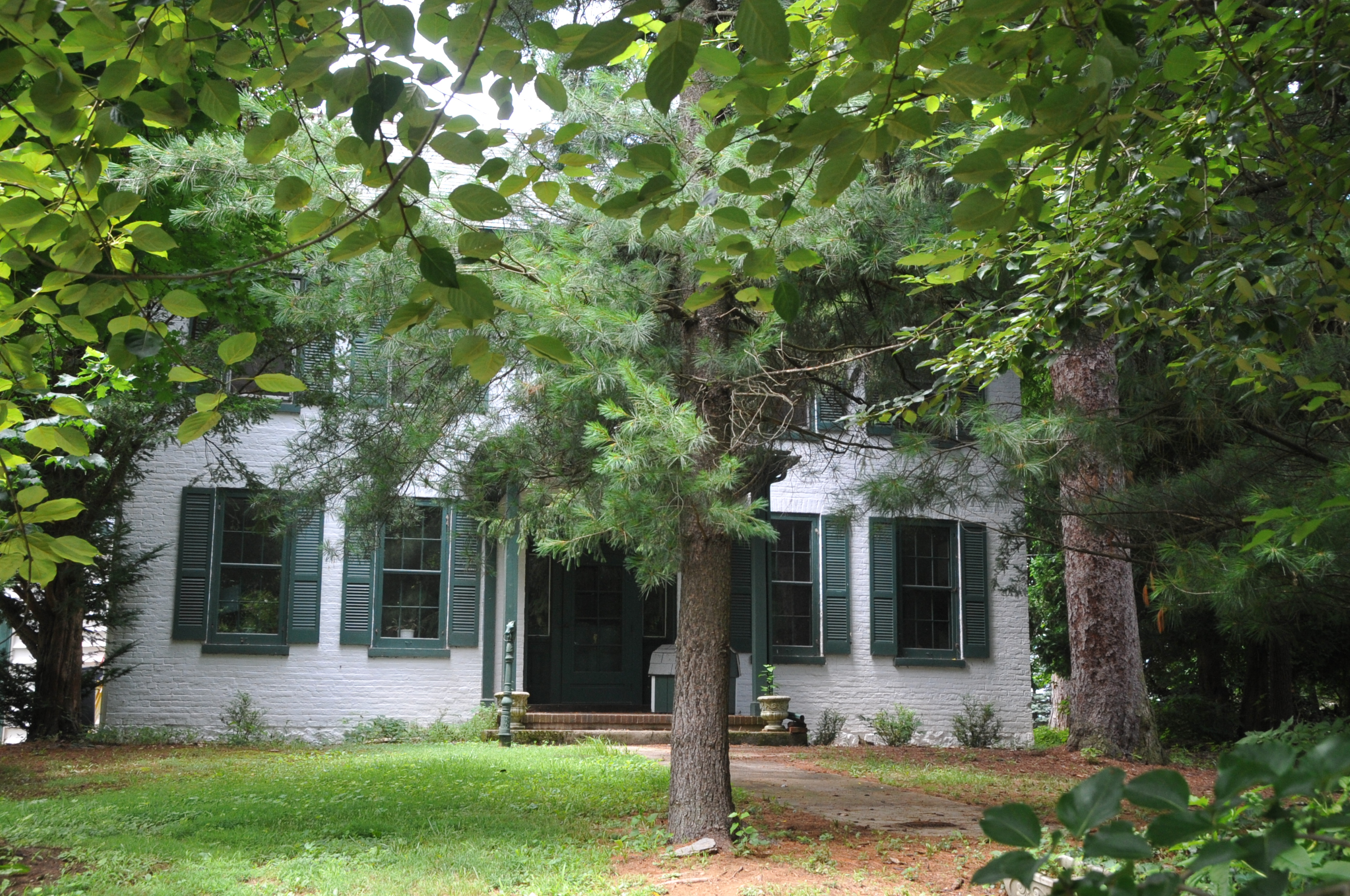

- Location within Maryland Location within the United States
- Location: 1251 Frederick St., Hagerstown, Maryland
- Coordinates: 39°36′49″N 77°42′45″W
- Area: 5.1 acres (2.1 ha)
- Built: 1865
- Architectural style: Greek Revival
- NRHP reference No.: 02001590
- Added to NRHP: December 27, 2002

Garden Hill, also known as the Robert Cushen farmstead, is a historic home located at Hagerstown, Washington County, Maryland, United States. It was built about 1865, and is a two-story five-bay brick dwelling with a formal facade and a central entrance. The house features Greek Revival detailing, with some Gothic Revival influence in interior trim.

It was listed on the National Register of Historic Places in 2002.
