= Jacob M. Funk Farm =

Historic house in Maryland, United States

- U.S. National Register of Historic Places
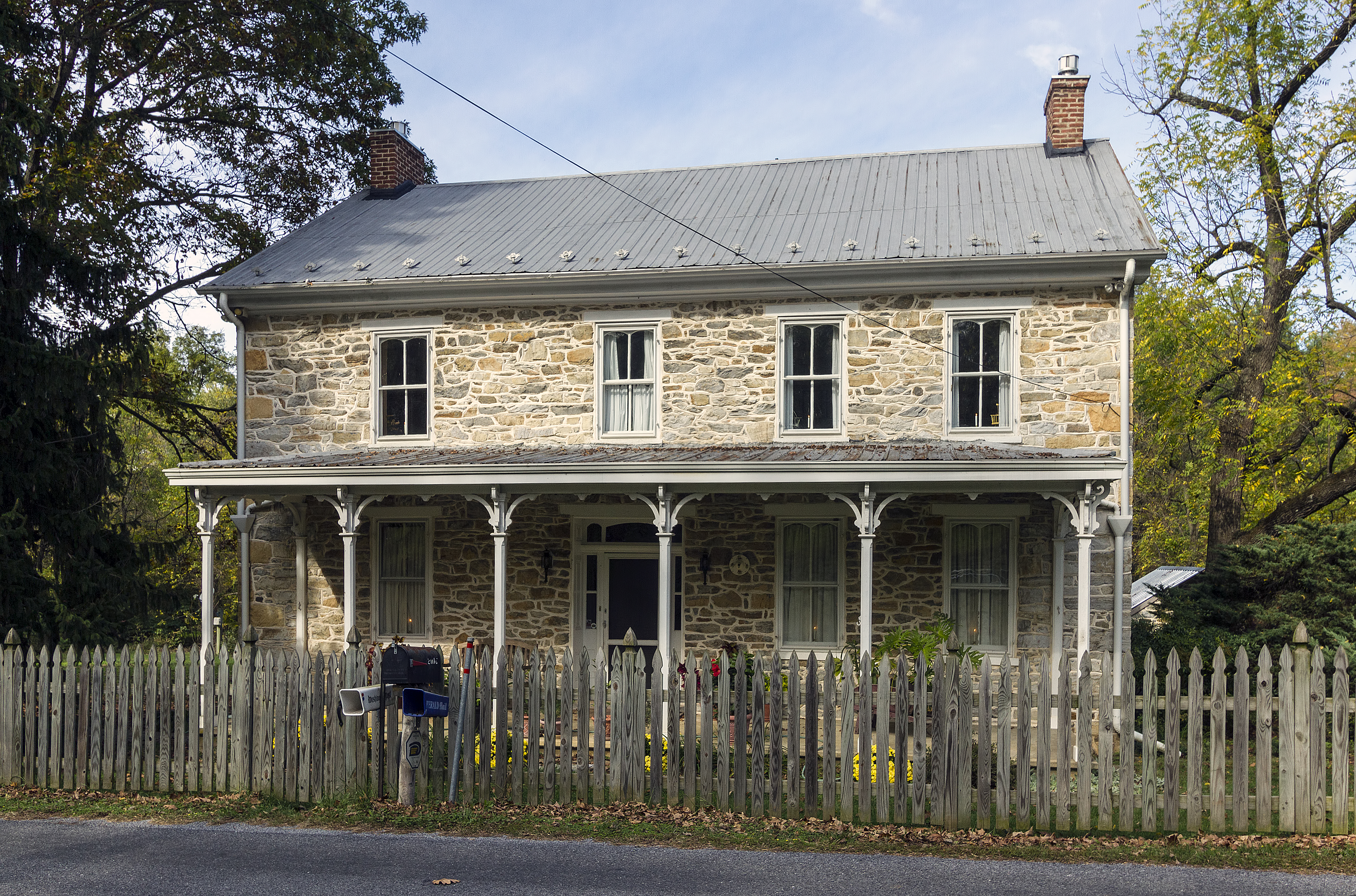

- Location within Maryland Location within the United States
- Location: 21116 Black Rock Road, near Hagerstown, Maryland
- Coordinates: 39°34′39″N 77°37′59″W
- Area: 7 acres (2.8 ha)
- Architectural style: Federal
- NRHP reference No.: 10000829
- Added to NRHP: October 14, 2010

The Jacob M. Funk Farm, also known as the Heaton House, is a historic farm in Washington County, Maryland, listed on the National Register of Historic Places. The 7.6 acres (3.1 ha) property includes a stone house, barn, springhouse and dairy house, all built of local stone. The buildings were built between 1800 and 1840, and represent an outstanding group of early 19th century stone German vernacular buildings of a type common to the area.

The house is two stories in an L-shape, with a frame addition. There are five rooms downstairs with an entry/stair hall, with a similar arrangement upstairs. A cellar includes traces of an older house that was incorporated into the new house. It features a fireplace that retains two swivel cooking cranes. The barn is a stone a frame structure of the "Sweitzer" kind, with stone ends.

The Jacob M. Funk Farm was listed on the National Register of Historic Places in 2006.
