= Houses At 16-22 East Lee Street =

Historic house in Maryland, United States

- U.S. National Register of Historic Places
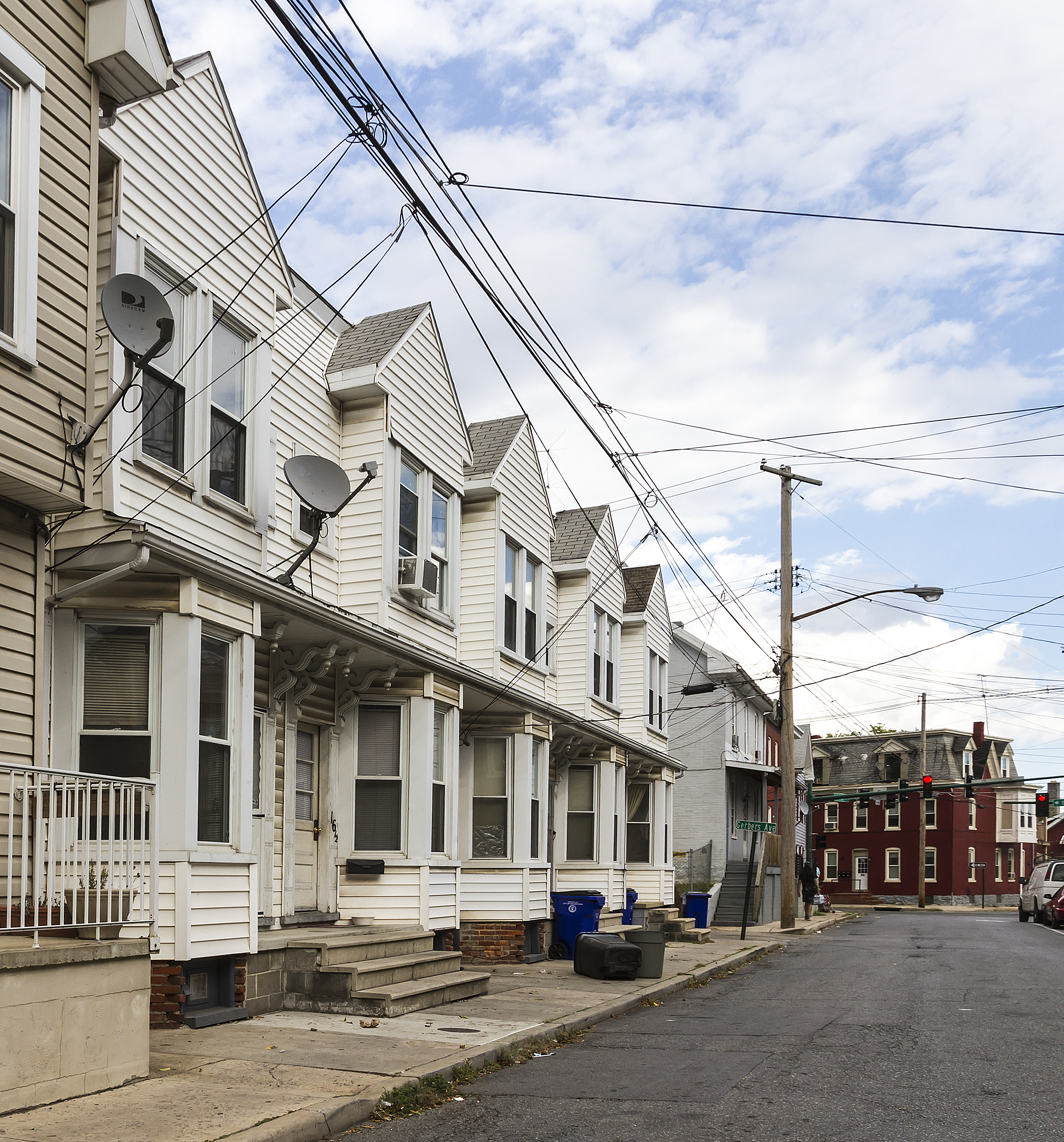
- 16-22 E. Lee St. in 2013 with vinyl siding

- Location within Maryland Location within the United States
- Location: 16--22 E. Lee St., Hagerstown, Maryland
- Coordinates: 39°38′12″N 77°43′19″W
- Area: less than one acre
- Built: 1894
- Built by: McC. Wolf, George B.
- Architectural style: Late Victorian
- NRHP reference No.: 77000703
- Added to NRHP: November 25, 1977

Houses At 16-22 East Lee Street is a block of historic homes located at Hagerstown, Washington County, Maryland, United States. They area group of five, 2 1/2-story frame rowhouses. The buildings rest on brick and stone foundations and have two inner open passageways leading from the street to the rear elevations. They are an important example of lower middle class domestic architecture in Hagerstown, erected about 1894.

The houses were listed on the National Register of Historic Places in 1977. Much of the houses' detailing has been covered by vinyl siding and aluminum trim.
