= Lehman's Mill Historic District =

Historic district in Maryland, United States

- U.S. National Register of Historic Places
- U.S. Historic district
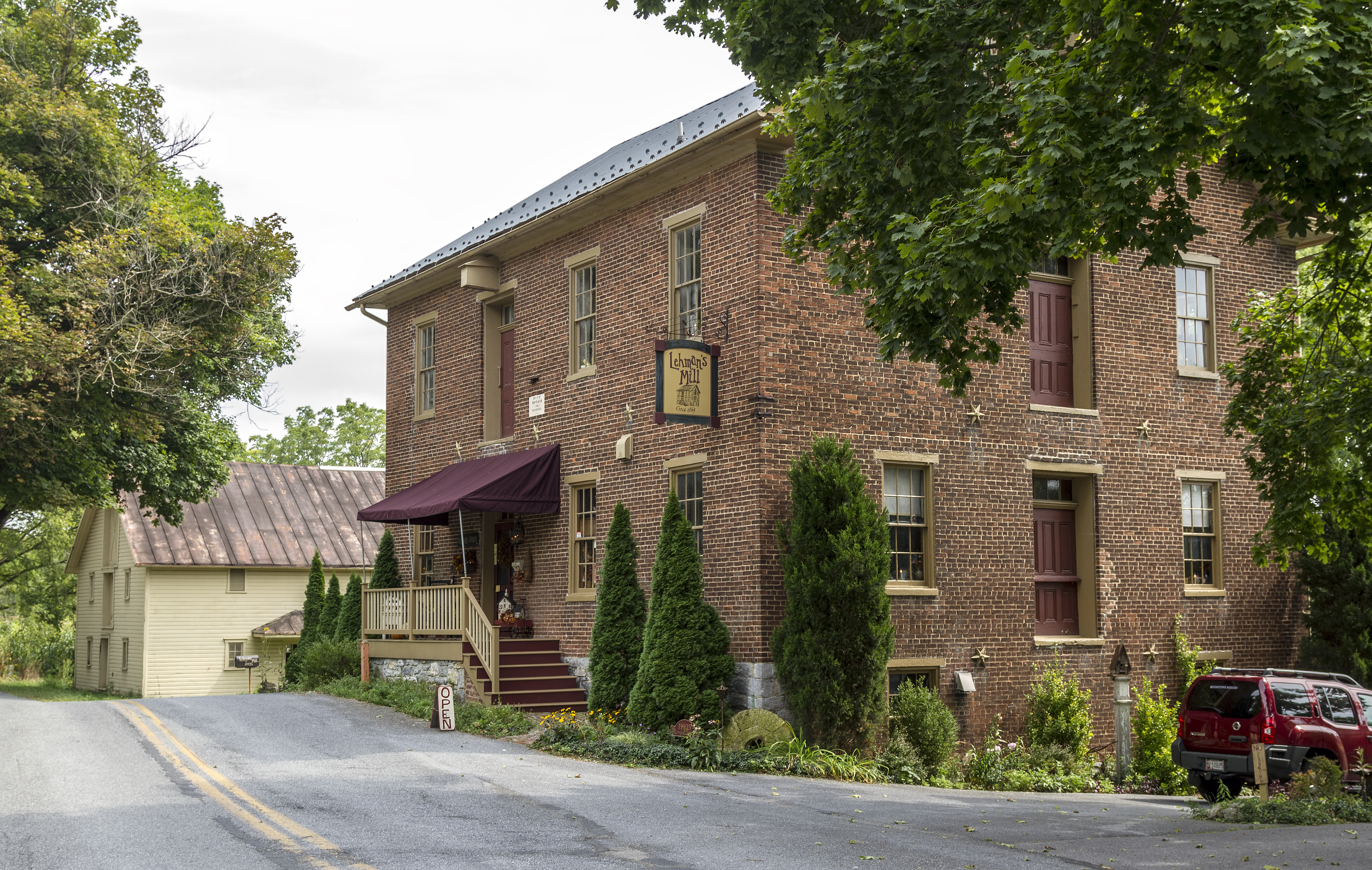

- Location within Maryland Location within the United States
- Location: Lehman's Mill Rd. between Marsh Pike and Marsh Run, Hagerstown, Maryland
- Coordinates: 39°42′41″N 77°40′34″W
- Area: 11 acres (4.5 ha)
- Built: 1837; 189 years ago
- Architectural style: Greek Revival, Late Victorian
- NRHP reference No.: 90001945
- Added to NRHP: January 4, 1991

Lehman's Mill Historic District is a national historic district at Hagerstown, Washington County, Maryland, United States. The district comprises the remaining buildings of the mill group including the brick Lehman's Mill, built in 1869 for Henry F. Lehman, the farmstead with a stuccoed stone house dated 1837 with older and newer sections, a barn, carriage house, and agricultural outbuildings; another dwelling, also built by Lehman in 1877, a two-story brick and frame house; related outbuildings, and a portion of the mill's head and tail race. It is the oldest continuously operating mill in Washington County, and is the most intact mill complex remaining in the county.

It was added to the National Register of Historic Places in 1991.
