= Rohrer House =

Historic house in Maryland, United States

- U.S. National Register of Historic Places
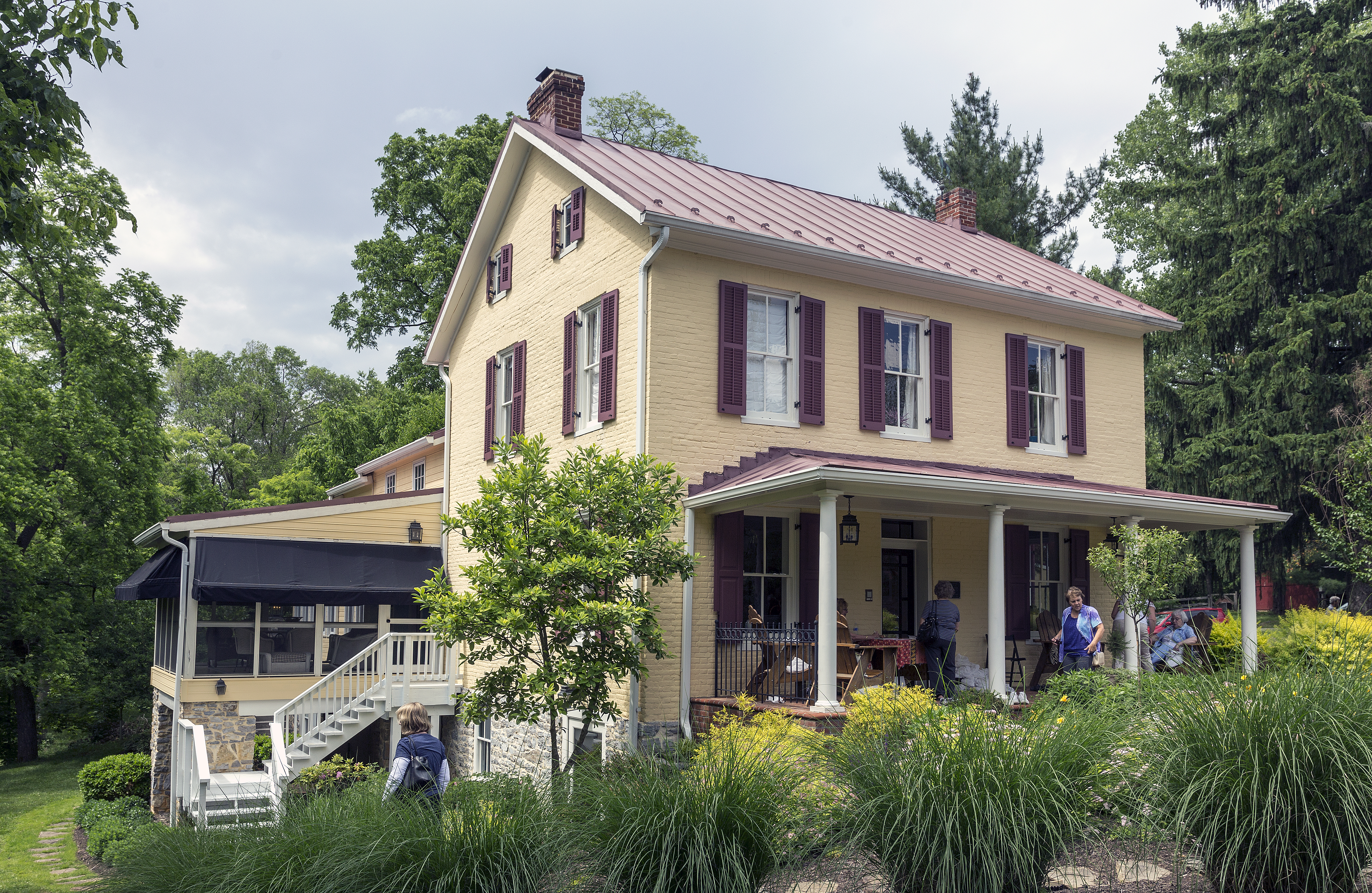

- Location within Maryland Location within the United States
- Location: East of Hagerstown, Hagerstown, Maryland
- Coordinates: 39°39′25″N 77°39′40″W
- Area: 15 acres (6.1 ha)
- Built: 1790
- NRHP reference No.: 79001146
- Added to NRHP: November 7, 1979

The Rohrer House, also known as Silsby House, is a historic home located at Hagerstown, Washington County, Maryland, United States. It is a three-bay, two-story brick dwelling, with a two bay frame rear wing, painted white with black trim. The house is set on fieldstone foundations and was built about 1790.

The Rohrer House was listed on the National Register of Historic Places in 1979.
