= Hagerstown, Maryland =

- City
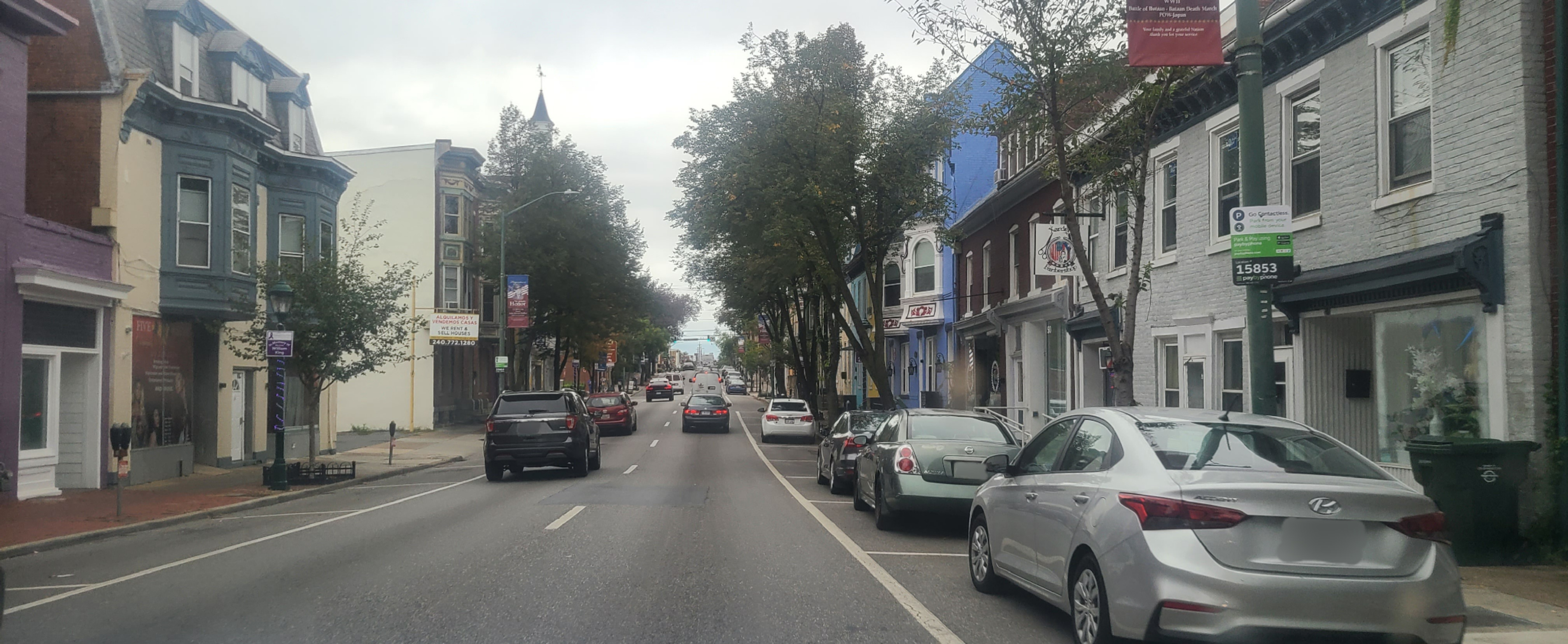

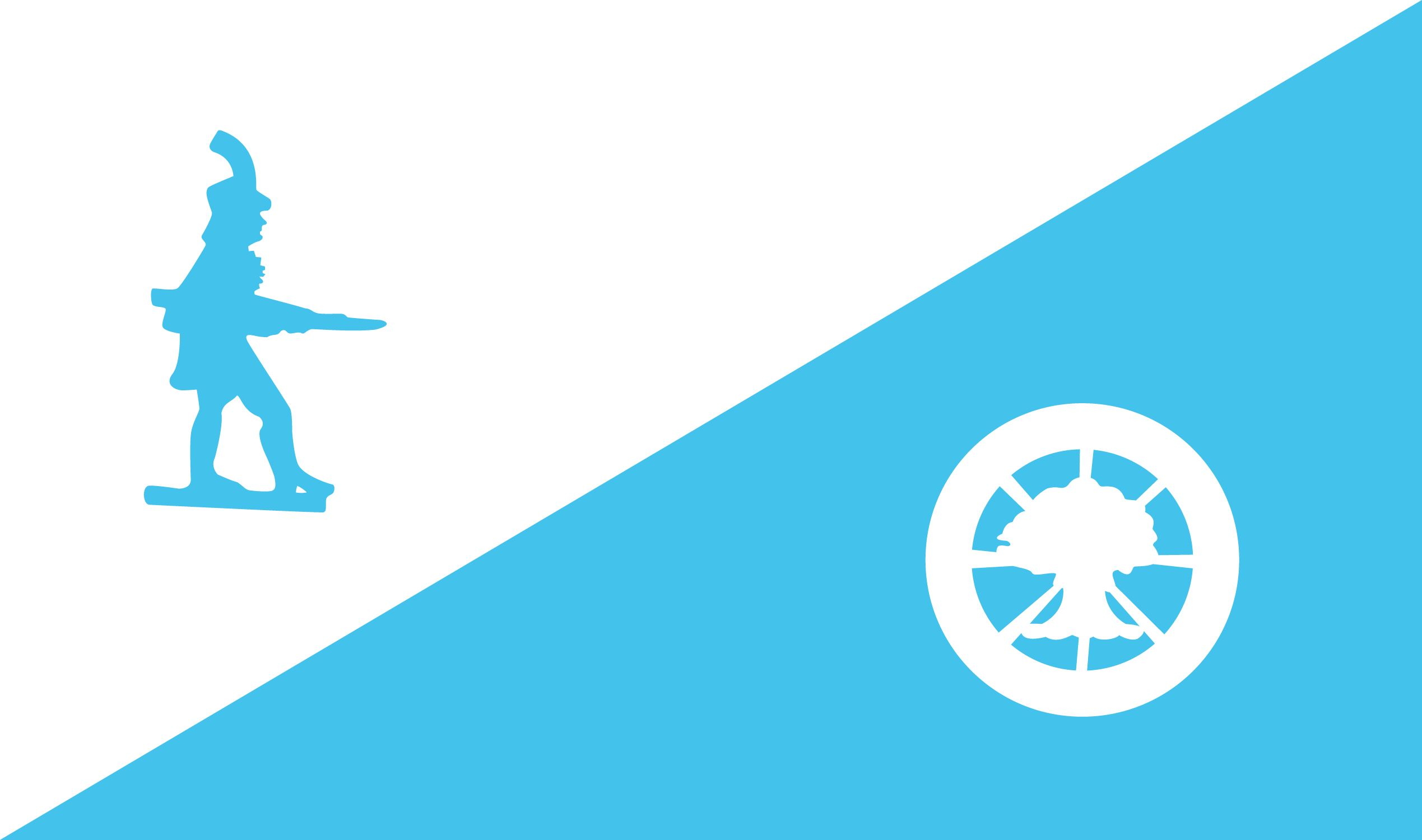
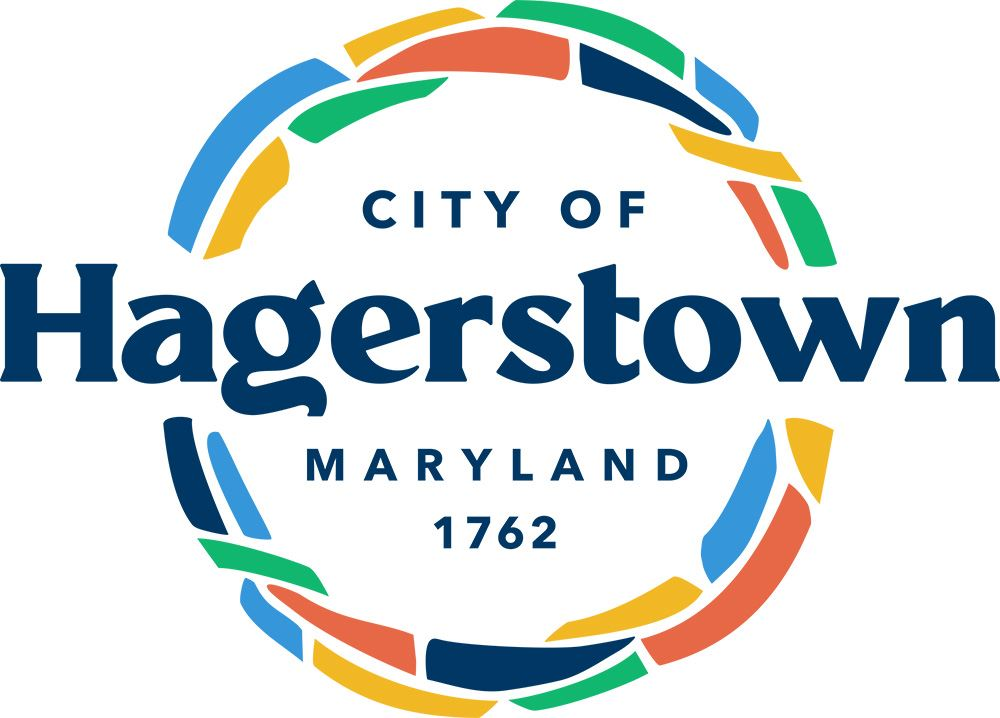
- Flag Seal Logo
- Nicknames: Hub City, Maryland's Gateway to the West, H-Town, (formerly) Home of the Flying Boxcar
- Motto(s): A Great Place to Live, Work, and Visit
- Interactive map of Hagerstown, Maryland
- Location within Maryland Location within the United States
- Coordinates: 39°37′24″N 77°44′12″W
- Country: United States
- State: Maryland
- County: Washington
- Founded: 1762
- Incorporated: 1813
- Founder: Jonathan Hager
- Named for: Jonathan Hager

Government
  - Type: Mayor–council
  - Mayor: Bill McIntire
  - City Council: List: Kristin B. Aleshire; Caroline Anderson; Erika Bell; Tiara Burnett; Sean Flaherty

Area
  - City: 12.56 sq mi (32.54 km^{2})
  - Land: 12.55 sq mi (32.51 km^{2})
  - Water: 0.012 sq mi (0.03 km^{2})
  - Urban: 120.8 sq mi (312.8 km^{2})
  - Metro: 1,018 sq mi (2,637 km^{2})
- Elevation: 551 ft (168 m)

Population (2020)
  - City: 43,527
  - Estimate (2021): 43,487
  - Density: 3,467.2/sq mi (1,338.71/km^{2})
  - Urban: 197,557 (US: 194th)
  - Urban density: 1,635.8/sq mi (631.6/km^{2})
  - Metro: 293,844 (US: 167th)
  - Metro density: 288.6/sq mi (111.4/km^{2})
- Demonym: Hagerstonian
- Time zone: UTC−5 (Eastern (EST))
  - Summer (DST): UTC−4 (EDT)
- ZIP Codes: 21740, 21741, 21742, 21746, 21747 and 21749
- Area codes: 301, 240
- FIPS code: 24-36075
- GNIS feature ID: 2390597
- Website: www.hagerstownmd.org

Hagerstown (Note: /ˈheɪɡərztaʊn/; HAY-gərz-town) is a city in Washington County, Maryland, United States, and its county seat. The population was 43,527 at the 2020 census. Hagerstown ranks as Maryland's sixth-most populous incorporated city and is the most populous city in the Maryland Panhandle.

Hagerstown anchors the Hagerstown metropolitan area extending into West Virginia. It makes up the northwesternmost portion of the Washington–Baltimore combined statistical area in the heart of the Great Appalachian Valley. The population of the metropolitan area in 2020 was 293,844. Greater Hagerstown was the fastest-growing metropolitan area in the state of Maryland and among the fastest growing in the United States, as of 2009.

Hagerstown has a distinct topography, formed by stone ridges running from northeast to southwest through the center of town. Geography accordingly bounds its neighborhoods. These ridges consist of upper Stonehenge Limestone. Many of the older buildings were built from this stone, which is easily quarried and dressed onsite. It whitens in weathering and the edgewise conglomerate and wavy laminae become distinctly visible, giving an appearance unique to the Cumberland Valley as seen in the architecture of St. John's Episcopal Church.

Despite its semi-rural Western Maryland setting, Hagerstown is a center of transit and commerce. Interstates 81 and 70, CSX, Norfolk Southern, and the Winchester and Western railroads, as well as Hagerstown Regional Airport form an extensive transportation network for the city. Hagerstown is also the chief commercial and industrial hub for a greater tri-state area that includes much of Western Maryland as well as significant portions of South Central Pennsylvania and the Martinsburg Panhandle Area. Hagerstown has often been referred to as, and is nicknamed, the Hub City.

== History ==
=== Founding ===
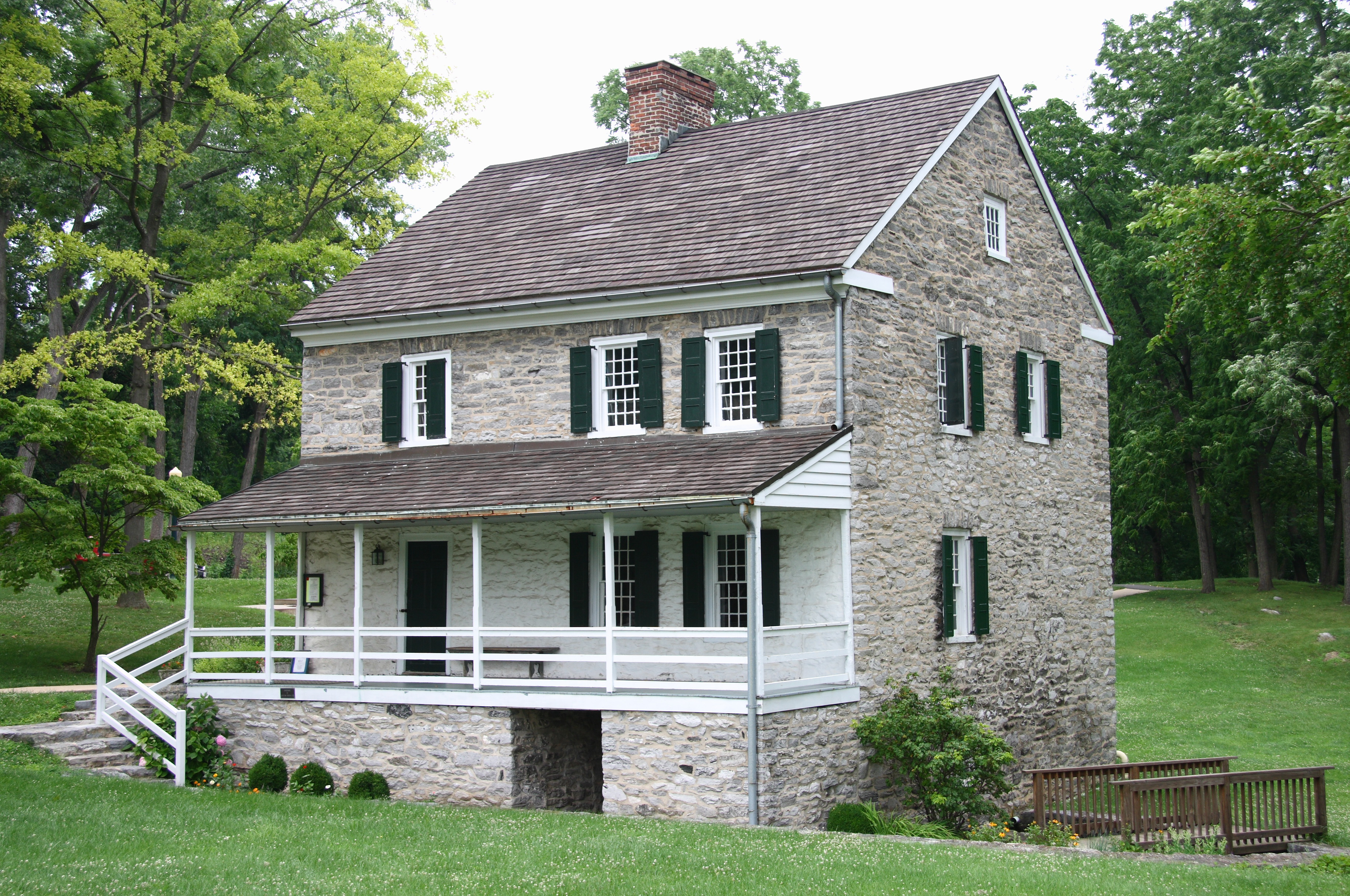
The Hager House and Museum in Hagerstown City Park was once home to the city's founder, Jonathan Hager.

In 1739, Jonathan Hager, a German immigrant from Pennsylvania and a volunteer Captain of Scouts, purchased 200 acres (81 ha) of land in the Great Appalachian Valley between the Blue Ridge and Allegheny Mountains in Maryland and called it Hager's Fancy. In 1762, Hager officially founded the town of Elizabethtown which he named after his wife, Elizabeth Kershner. Fourteen years later, Jonathan Hager became known as the "father of Washington County" after his efforts helped Hagerstown become the county seat of newly created Washington County, which Hager also helped create from neighboring Frederick County. The city council changed the community's name to Hager's-Town in 1813 because the name had gained popular usage, and in the following year, the Maryland State Legislature officially endorsed the changing of the town's name.

In 1794, government forces arrested 150 citizens during a draft riot which was staged by protesters in response to the Whiskey Rebellion.

=== American Civil War ===
Hagerstown's strategic location at the border between the North and the South made the city a primary staging area and supply center for four major campaigns during the Civil War. In 1861, General Robert Patterson's troops used Hagerstown as a base to attack Virginia troops in the Shenandoah Valley. In the Maryland Campaign of 1862, General James Longstreet's command occupied the town while en route to the Battle of South Mountain and Antietam. In 1863, the city was the site of several military incursions and engagements as Gen. Robert E. Lee's army invaded and retreated in the Gettysburg campaign. In 1864, Hagerstown was invaded by the Confederate army under Lt. Gen. Jubal Early. On Wednesday, July 6, Early sent 1,500 cavalry, commanded by Brig. Gen. John McCausland, into Hagerstown. The Confederates levied a ransom of $20,000 and a large amount of clothing, in retribution for U.S. destruction of farms, feed and cattle in the Shenandoah Valley. This is in contrast to neighboring Chambersburg, Pennsylvania, which McCausland razed on July 30 when the borough failed to supply the requested ransom of $500,000 in U.S. currency, or $100,000 in gold.

Following the war, in 1872 Maryland and Virginia cooperated to re-inter Confederate dead from their impromptu graves to cemeteries in Hagerstown, Frederick and Shepherdstown, West Virginia. Roughly 60% however, remained unidentified. In 1877, 15 years after the Battle of Antietam, also known as the Battle of Sharpsburg, approximately 2,800 Confederate dead from that battle and also from the battles on South Mountain were re-interred in Washington Confederate Cemetery, within Rose Hill Cemetery in Hagerstown.

=== Railroads ===
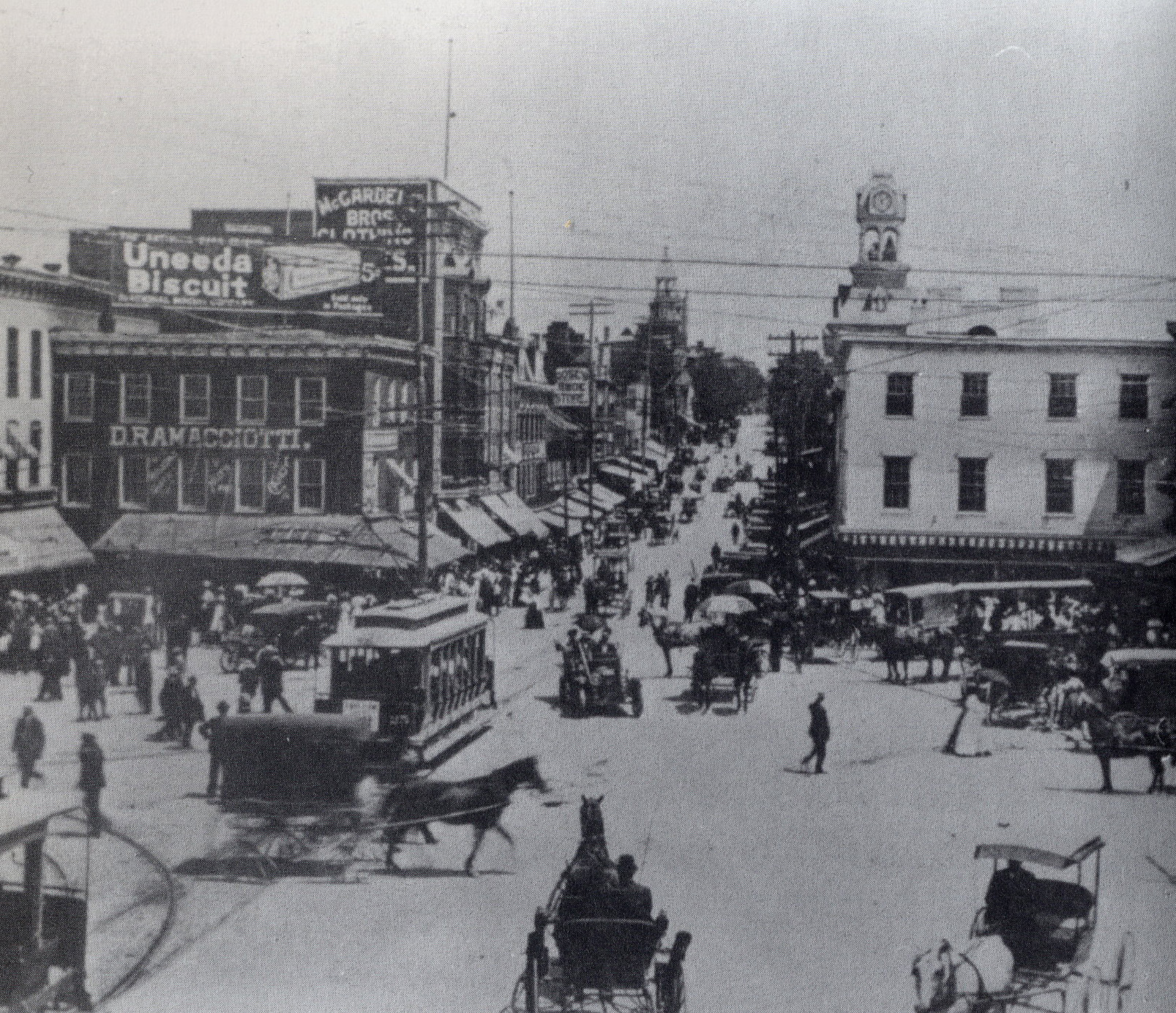
Hagerstown Public Square c. 1900

Hagerstown's nickname of the "Hub City" originated from the large number of railroads (and roads) that served the city. Hagerstown was served by the Western Maryland Railway, Baltimore and Ohio, the Chesapeake and Ohio Railway, and the Cumberland Valley Railroad. Currently, the city is a vital location on CSX, Norfolk Southern, and the Winchester and Western Railroads.

Hagerstown was formerly served from 1896 to 1947 by the Hagerstown Railway (and later the Hagerstown & Frederick Railway), which was an interurban trolley system.

=== Little Heiskell ===
The weathervane known as "Little Heiskell", a symbol of the city of Hagerstown

One of the most recognizable symbols of Hagerstown is the weathervane known as "Little Heiskell". It is named after the German tinsmith Benjamin Heiskell, who crafted it in 1769 in the form of a Hessian soldier.

== Geography ==
=== Location and topography ===
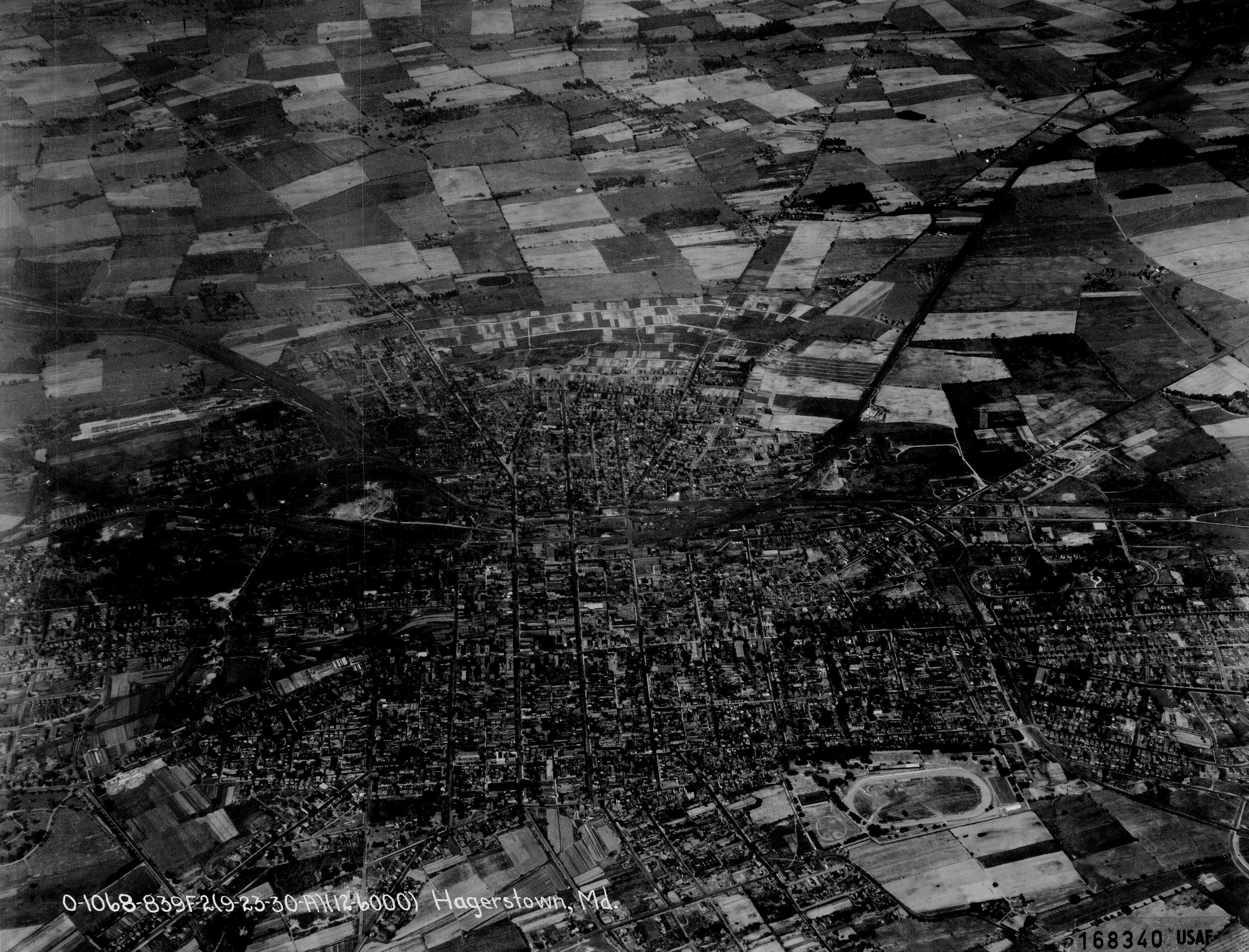
Hagerstown in 1930

Hagerstown is situated south of the Mason–Dixon line and north of the Potomac River and between the Blue Ridge and Allegheny Mountains in a part of the Great Appalachian Valley known regionally as Cumberland Valley and locally as Hagerstown Valley. The community also lies within proximity of Pennsylvania, West Virginia, and Virginia. Hagerstown, by driving distance, is approximately 70 miles (110 km) northwest of Washington, D.C., 72 miles (116 km) west-northwest of Baltimore and 74 miles (119 km) southwest of Harrisburg, Pennsylvania.

According to the United States Census Bureau, the city has a total area of 11.80 square miles (30.56 km^{2}), of which 11.79 square miles (30.54 km^{2}) is land and 0.01 square miles (0.03 km^{2}) is water. Major waterways within Hagerstown include Hamilton Run and Antietam Creek that are tributaries of the Potomac River. Natural landscape around Hagerstown consists of low, rolling hills with elevations of 500 feet (150 m) to 800 feet (240 m) above sea level and rich, fertile land that is well-suited and utilized for dairy farming, cornfields, and fruit orchards typical of Mid-Atlantic agriculture.

=== Climate ===
Hagerstown is situated in the transition between the humid subtropical climate zone (Köppen Cfa) and the humid continental climate zone (Köppen Dfa), with hot, humid summers and cool to moderately cold winters. Normal monthly mean temperatures range from 32.9 °F (0.5 °C) in January to 77.6 °F (25.3 °C) in July, while record temperatures range from −27 °F (−33 °C) on January 13, 1912, up to 107 °F (42 °C) on July 23, 1999. Precipitation is moderate, averaging 39.29 in (998 mm) annually, and is somewhat evenly distributed throughout the year, with a slight winter minimum and a maximum in May and June.

Climate data for Hagerstown, Maryland (Hagerstown Regional Airport), 1991–2020 normals, extremes 1899–present
Month	Jan	Feb	Mar	Apr	May	Jun	Jul	Aug	Sep	Oct	Nov	Dec	Year
Record high °F (°C)	78 (26)	82 (28)	88 (31)	94 (34)	96 (36)	102 (39)	107 (42)	104 (40)	101 (38)	95 (35)	83 (28)	75 (24)	107 (42)
Mean maximum °F (°C)	62.5 (16.9)	64.2 (17.9)	74.9 (23.8)	84.3 (29.1)	90.0 (32.2)	93.8 (34.3)	96.1 (35.6)	94.3 (34.6)	90.0 (32.2)	82.4 (28.0)	72.0 (22.2)	62.6 (17.0)	97.0 (36.1)
Mean daily maximum °F (°C)	40.5 (4.7)	43.6 (6.4)	52.8 (11.6)	64.9 (18.3)	74.4 (23.6)	82.6 (28.1)	87.3 (30.7)	84.9 (29.4)	77.8 (25.4)	66.0 (18.9)	54.4 (12.4)	44.0 (6.7)	64.4 (18.0)
Daily mean °F (°C)	32.9 (0.5)	35.5 (1.9)	43.4 (6.3)	54.6 (12.6)	64.4 (18.0)	73.1 (22.8)	77.6 (25.3)	75.3 (24.1)	68.4 (20.2)	56.7 (13.7)	45.9 (7.7)	36.9 (2.7)	55.4 (13.0)
Mean daily minimum °F (°C)	25.3 (−3.7)	27.3 (−2.6)	34.0 (1.1)	44.3 (6.8)	54.5 (12.5)	63.7 (17.6)	67.9 (19.9)	65.7 (18.7)	58.9 (14.9)	47.4 (8.6)	37.4 (3.0)	29.8 (−1.2)	46.3 (7.9)
Mean minimum °F (°C)	6.7 (−14.1)	10.0 (−12.2)	16.4 (−8.7)	28.4 (−2.0)	38.4 (3.6)	49.2 (9.6)	56.1 (13.4)	54.1 (12.3)	43.6 (6.4)	32.0 (0.0)	22.3 (−5.4)	13.8 (−10.1)	4.4 (−15.3)
Record low °F (°C)	−27 (−33)	−20 (−29)	−7 (−22)	9 (−13)	23 (−5)	30 (−1)	42 (6)	39 (4)	25 (−4)	18 (−8)	−4 (−20)	−13 (−25)	−27 (−33)
Average precipitation inches (mm)	2.46 (62)	1.97 (50)	3.04 (77)	3.33 (85)	3.55 (90)	3.36 (85)	2.94 (75)	2.90 (74)	3.83 (97)	2.76 (70)	2.63 (67)	2.83 (72)	35.60 (904)
Average precipitation days (≥ 0.01 in)	10.0	8.9	10.3	11.7	14.0	11.8	11.4	10.0	9.5	9.2	8.4	9.2	124.4
Source: NOAA

== Demographics ==
Historical population
Census	Pop.	Note	%±
1820	2,670		—
1830	3,371		26.3%
1840	3,625		7.5%
1850	3,879		7.0%
1860	4,132		6.5%
1870	5,779		39.9%
1880	6,627		14.7%
1890	10,118		52.7%
1900	13,591		34.3%
1910	16,507		21.5%
1920	28,064		70.0%
1930	30,851		9.9%
1940	32,491		5.3%
1950	36,260		11.6%
1960	36,660		1.1%
1970	35,862		−2.2%
1980	34,132		−4.8%
1990	35,445		3.8%
2000	36,687		3.5%
2010	39,662		8.1%
2020	43,527		9.7%
2022 (est.)	43,701		0.4%
U.S. Decennial Census; 2018 Estimate

=== 2020 census ===
As of the 2020 census, Hagerstown had a population of 43,527. The median age was 36.2 years. 25.2% of residents were under the age of 18 and 14.8% of residents were 65 years of age or older. For every 100 females there were 89.4 males, and for every 100 females age 18 and over there were 86.3 males age 18 and over.

99.9% of residents lived in urban areas, while 0.1% lived in rural areas.

There were 17,768 households in Hagerstown, of which 31.5% had children under the age of 18 living in them. Of all households, 30.6% were married-couple households, 23.6% were households with a male householder and no spouse or partner present, and 35.9% were households with a female householder and no spouse or partner present. About 34.8% of all households were made up of individuals and 12.9% had someone living alone who was 65 years of age or older.

There were 19,779 housing units, of which 10.2% were vacant. The homeowner vacancy rate was 2.5% and the rental vacancy rate was 8.8%.

Racial composition as of the 2020 census
Race	Number	Percent
White	27,173	62.4%
Black or African American	8,652	19.9%
American Indian and Alaska Native	159	0.4%
Asian	919	2.1%
Native Hawaiian and Other Pacific Islander	27	0.1%
Some other race	1,951	4.5%
Two or more races	4,646	10.7%
Hispanic or Latino (of any race)	4,281	9.8%

=== 2010 census ===
As of the census of 2010, there were 39,662 people, 16,449 households, and 9,436 families residing in the city. The population density was 3,364.0 inhabitants per square mile (1,298.8/km^{2}). There were 18,682 housing units at an average density of 1,584.6 per square mile (611.8/km^{2}). The racial makeup of the city was 75.8% White, 15.5% African American, 0.3% Native American, 1.3% Asian, 0.1% Pacific Islander, 2.1% from other races, and 5.1% from two or more races. Hispanic or Latino people of any race were 5.6% of the population.

There were 16,449 households, of which 32.9% had children under the age of 18 living with them, 33.6% were married couples living together, 18.4% had a female householder with no husband present, 5.4% had a male householder with no wife present, and 42.6% were non-families. 34.5% of all households were made up of individuals, and 10.5% had someone living alone who was 65 years of age or older. The average household size was 2.36 and the average family size was 3.04.

The median age in the city was 34.5 years. 25.8% of residents were under the age of 18; 9.5% were between the ages of 18 and 24; 28.6% were from 25 to 44; 24% were from 45 to 64; and 12.3% were 65 years of age or older. The gender makeup of the city was 47.3% male and 52.7% female. Between 2011 and 2015, 26.8% of the population lived in poverty.

=== 2000 census ===
As of the U.S. census of 2000, there were 36,687 people, 15,849 households, and 9,081 families residing in the city.

According to Census 2000 figures, the population density was 3,441.5 inhabitants per square mile (1,328.8/km^{2}). There were 17,089 housing units at an average density of 1,603.1 per square mile (619.0/km^{2}). The racial makeup of the city was 85.95% White, 10.15% Black, 1.77% Hispanic or Latino, 0.25% Native American, 0.96% Asian, 0.04% Pacific Islander, 0.83% from other races, and 1.83% from two or more races. There were 17,154 males and 19,533 females residing in the city.

There were 15,849 households, out of which 29.5% had children under the age of 18 living with them, 36.8% were married couples living together, 15.9% had a female householder with no husband present, and 42.7% were non-families. 35.4% of all households were made up of individuals, and 12.9% had someone living alone who was 65 years of age or older. The average household size was 2.26 and the average family size was 2.93.

In the city, the population was spread out, with 25.6% under the age of 18, 9.0% from 18 to 24, 31.0% from 25 to 44, 20.1% from 45 to 64, and 14.3% who were 65 years of age or older. The median age was 35 years. For every 100 females, there were 87.8 males. For every 100 females age 18 and over, there were 83.6 males.

The median income for a household in the city was $30,796, and the median income for a family was $38,149. Males had a median income of $31,200 versus $22,549 for females. The per capita income for the city was $17,153. About 15.1% of families and 18.1% of the population were below the poverty line, including 27.0% of those under age 18 and 13.7% of those age 65 or over.

=== Metropolitan area ===
Hagerstown–Martinsburg, MD–WV MSA consists of three counties:

- Washington County, Maryland
- Berkeley County, West Virginia
- Morgan County, West Virginia

The primary cities are Hagerstown and Martinsburg, West Virginia. The metropolitan area's population in 2000 was 222,771. The 2008 estimate is 263,753, making Greater Hagerstown the 169th largest metropolitan area in the United States. The growth rate from 2000 to 2008 is +18.4%, the 48th highest among metropolitan areas in the entire country and the highest in Maryland (and in West Virginia). The growth is mostly due to the influx of people from Washington, D.C., and Baltimore, MD.

== Economy ==
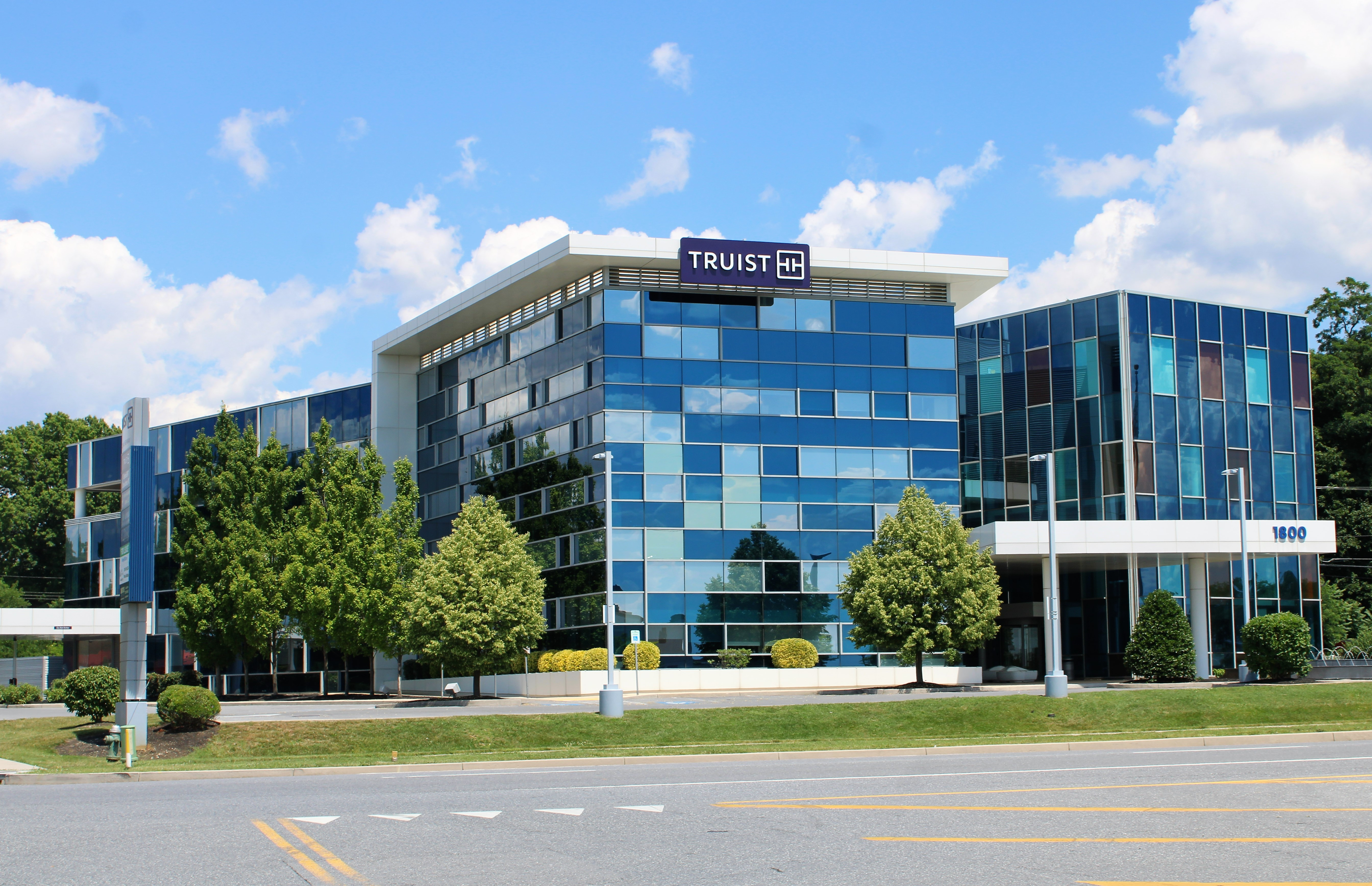
Truist Financial Center

Once primarily an industrial community, Hagerstown's economy depended heavily on railroad transportation and manufacturing, notably of aircraft, trucks, automobiles, textiles, and furniture. Today, the city has a diversified, stable business environment with modern service companies in various fields as well as continued strength in manufacturing and transportation in railroads and highways. Surrounding Hagerstown, there has been and continues to be a strong agricultural presence while tourism, especially with respect to the retail sector, also provides support to the local economy.

Amid the COVID-19 pandemic, e-commerce brands began searching for new places to do business. Due to high property prices near Interstate 95 businesses looked to develop along Interstate 81. The Hagerstown-Washington County area is attractive since it intersects Interstate 81 and Interstate 70, and because of this, numerous warehouses have been built in Hagerstown and the surrounding area.

Kreider-Reisner was formed in 1923, merged into Fairchild Aircraft in 1929, and manufactured components of military and civilian aircraft at Hagerstown until 1984. The former aircraft factory is now manufacturing ammunition for rifles and pistols. Manufacturing, which was never entirely removed from the Hagerstown economy, returned to Hagerstown when Hitachi Rail began construction of a $70 million factory in Hagerstown.

=== Healthcare ===
- Meritus Medical Center (a part of Meritus Health), acute care inpatient and outpatient facility
- Western Maryland Hospital Center, chronic-care state-run health center
- Brook Lane Psychiatric Center, private mental health facility

=== Shopping ===
Hagerstown has 2 major shopping malls in its vicinity:

- Hagerstown Outlets, a 100+ store outlet mall which attracts visitors from Washington and Baltimore as well as nearby counties
- Valley Mall, anchored by JCPenney, Belk, Old Navy, and Regal Cinemas 16

== Culture ==
=== Historical sites ===
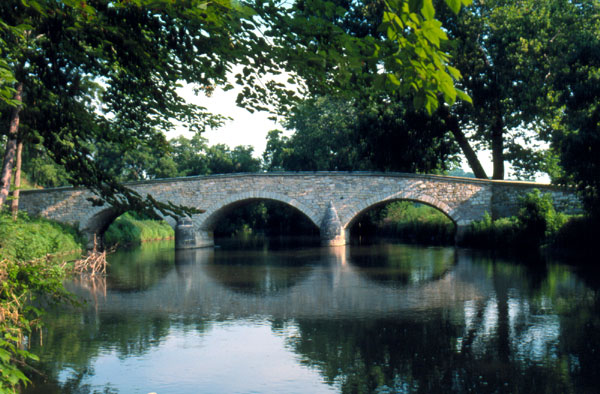
Burnside's Bridge, a site of heavy combat in the Battle of Antietam, which occurred south of Hagerstown

Hagerstown's location at the center of the Western Maryland region makes it an ideal starting point for touring, especially with respect to the Civil War. Antietam National Battlefield, the site of the bloodiest single day in American history, is located in nearby Sharpsburg. South Mountain State Battlefield is also located in Washington County in Boonsboro. Gettysburg, Monocacy, and Harpers Ferry battlefields are all located within a 30-minute drive of Hagerstown.

Fort Frederick State Park, which features a restored fort used in the French and Indian War, is west of the city in nearby Big Pool, Maryland.

Washington Monument State Park, near Boonsboro, pays tribute to the country's first president, George Washington. It is the oldest structure to honor the "father of our country."

Hagerstown is also home to the Chesapeake and Ohio Canal National Historical Park Headquarters.

The city and surrounding vicinity also has a number of sites and districts listed on the National Register of Historic Places. They include the Antietam Furnace Complex Archeological Site, Antietam Hall, Brightwood, Colonial Theatre, Ditto Knolls, Dorsey-Palmer House, Elliot-Bester House, Jacob M. Funk Farm, Garden Hill, Good-Hartle Farm, Hager House, Hagerstown Armory, Hagerstown Charity School, Hagerstown City Park Historic District, Hagerstown Commercial Core Historic District, Hagerstown Historic District, Houses At 16-22 East Lee Street, Lantz-Zeigler House, Lehman's Mill Historic District, Long Meadows, Maryland Theatre, Henry McCauley Farm, Oak Hill Historic District, Old Forge Farm, Old Washington County Library, Paradise Manor, Potomac-Broadway Historic District, Price-Miller House, Rockland Farm, Rockledge, Rohrer House, South Prospect Street Historic District, Trovinger Mill, Valentia, Washington County Courthouse, Western Maryland Railway Station, Western Maryland Railway Steam Locomotive No. 202, and Wilson's Bridge.

=== Parks and museums ===
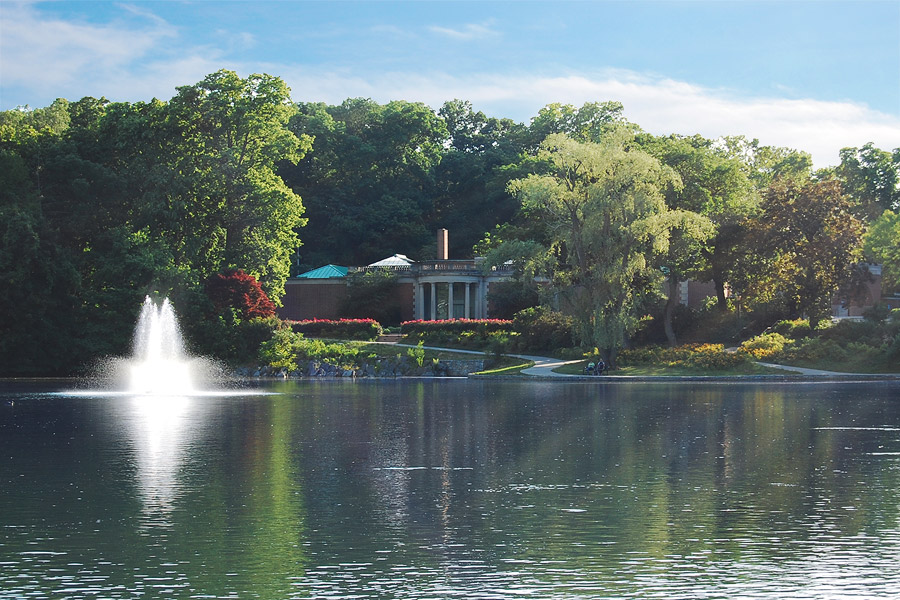
Washington County Museum of Fine Arts in Hagerstown City Park

Within the city, there are numerous parks including Hagerstown City Park, which is home to the Washington County Museum of Fine Arts, Mansion House Art Gallery, Western Maryland 202 Locomotive Display and Museum, and the Hager House and Museum (once home of Jonathan Hager, founder of Hagerstown). Outside the park, Hagerstown Roundhouse Museum showcases exhibits of Hagerstown's early railroad history. Discovery Station, located downtown, is a hands-on science and technology museum featuring exhibits in numerous galleries and display areas, including the Hagerstown Aviation Museum. Fairgrounds Park is the city's largest active recreation park. It features a baseball field, a BMX track, exercise equipment, an in-line hockey rink, a skatepark, soccer fields, softball fields, and walking trails.

=== Theater and arts ===
Hagerstown is home to the Maryland Theatre, a symphony house that plays host to the Maryland Symphony Orchestra and the annual Miss Maryland Scholarship Opportunity, a preliminary to Miss America. The city also has the Washington County Playhouse, which does dinner theater performances. The Barbara Ingram School for the Arts is a magnet school for gifted art students, located in downtown Hagerstown's arts and entertainment district on South Potomac Street.

=== Festivals and events ===
Downtown Hagerstown recently has enjoyed a resurgence and now hosts several popular annual events. The Quad State Beer Fest is a craft beer and music festival that features regional breweries, rock music and entertainment held at various times throughout the year. The Interstate BBQ Festival is a Kansas City Barque Society sanctioned competition which hosts dozens of professional and backyard teams and draws thousands of spectators as a huge regional event. The city draws thousands every year around May–June to the Western Maryland Blues Fest, which showcases blues artists from around the country. The Augustoberfest celebrates Hagerstown's German heritage. The Alsatia Mummers Parade is an annual parade during the Halloween season. It is run by Alsatia Club Inc. and was first run in 1921.

Fairgrounds Park hosts various events throughout the year like the annual Hagerstown Hispanic Festival held in mid-September and the cities annual July 4 firework show.

=== Professional sports ===
==== Professional baseball ====
===== Blue Ridge League (1915–1929) =====
From 1915 to 1929, Hagerstown's Class D minor league team played in the Blue Ridge League at Willow Lane Park, now the site of Bester Elementary School, under several names: Blues (1915), Terriers (1916–18, 1922–23), Champs (1920–21), and Hubs (1924–1930). In 1930, Municipal Stadium was constructed and the Hubs played their final season there. In 1931, prior to the next season beginning, the Blue Ridge League folded due to financial losses and the Hagerstown Hubs moved to Parkersburg, West Virginia.

===== Various Negro Leagues (1935–1955) =====
From 1935 to 1955, various barnstorming Negro League teams played in Hagerstown on at least seven occasions; however, there is no complete history of Black baseball in Hagerstown as local news rarely covered it.

===== Interstate League and Piedmont League (1941–1955) =====
In 1941, professional baseball returned to Hagerstown when the Detroit Tigers moved their minor league affiliate there. The Hagerstown Owls competed in the Class B Interstate League. In 1950, the Owls were renamed the Hagerstown Braves as they became a minor league affiliate of the Boston Braves. In 1953, the Braves joined the Class B Piedmont League. In 1954, the Braves were renamed the Hagerstown Packets and became a minor league affiliate of the Washington Senators. The Piedmont League ceased operations in 1955 and Hagerstown was left without a team until 1981.

===== Hagerstown Suns (1981–2020) =====
From 1981 to 2020, the Hagerstown Suns played in Municipal Stadium and were initially the Class A affiliate of the Baltimore Orioles. The Suns became the Double-A affiliate of the Orioles in 1989. They were affiliated with the Orioles until 1992 when the Suns moved to Bowie, Maryland and became the Bowie Baysox. Shortly after the Suns departure in 1992, the Myrtle Beach Hurricanes relocated to Hagerstown, became the Hagerstown Suns, and became the Class A affiliate of the Toronto Blue Jays. They would remain Class A for the remainder of their existence. In 2001, they affiliated with the San Francisco Giants. They affiliated with the New York Mets in 2005, and then with the Washington Nationals in 2007. The Suns folded in 2021 when Minor League Baseball was restructured and reduced to 120 teams. Municipal Stadium was demolished in 2022 to make way for an indoor turf complex.

===== Hagerstown Flying Boxcars (2024–present) =====
On September 1, 2021, the Atlantic League announced approval for a new baseball team in Hagerstown. The team will play in the new Meritus Park. The team was initially set to begin play in 2023, but delays in stadium construction pushed the inaugural season to 2024. A groundbreaking ceremony was held in October 2022 for the new stadium. On July 20, 2023, the team name was announced as the Hagerstown Flying Boxcars after fan submissions and voting. The other options for voting were Haymakers, Battling Swans, Diezel Dogs, and Tin Lizards. The team opened their inaugural season on April 25, 2024, on the road against the York Revolution, and had their home opener at Meritus Park with limited attendance on May 4, 2024.

==== Other professional sports ====
To the west of the city lies Hagerstown Speedway, a nationally known dirt-track racing venue. Another professional racing track, Mason-Dixon Dragway, is located just southeast of Hagerstown.

== Government ==
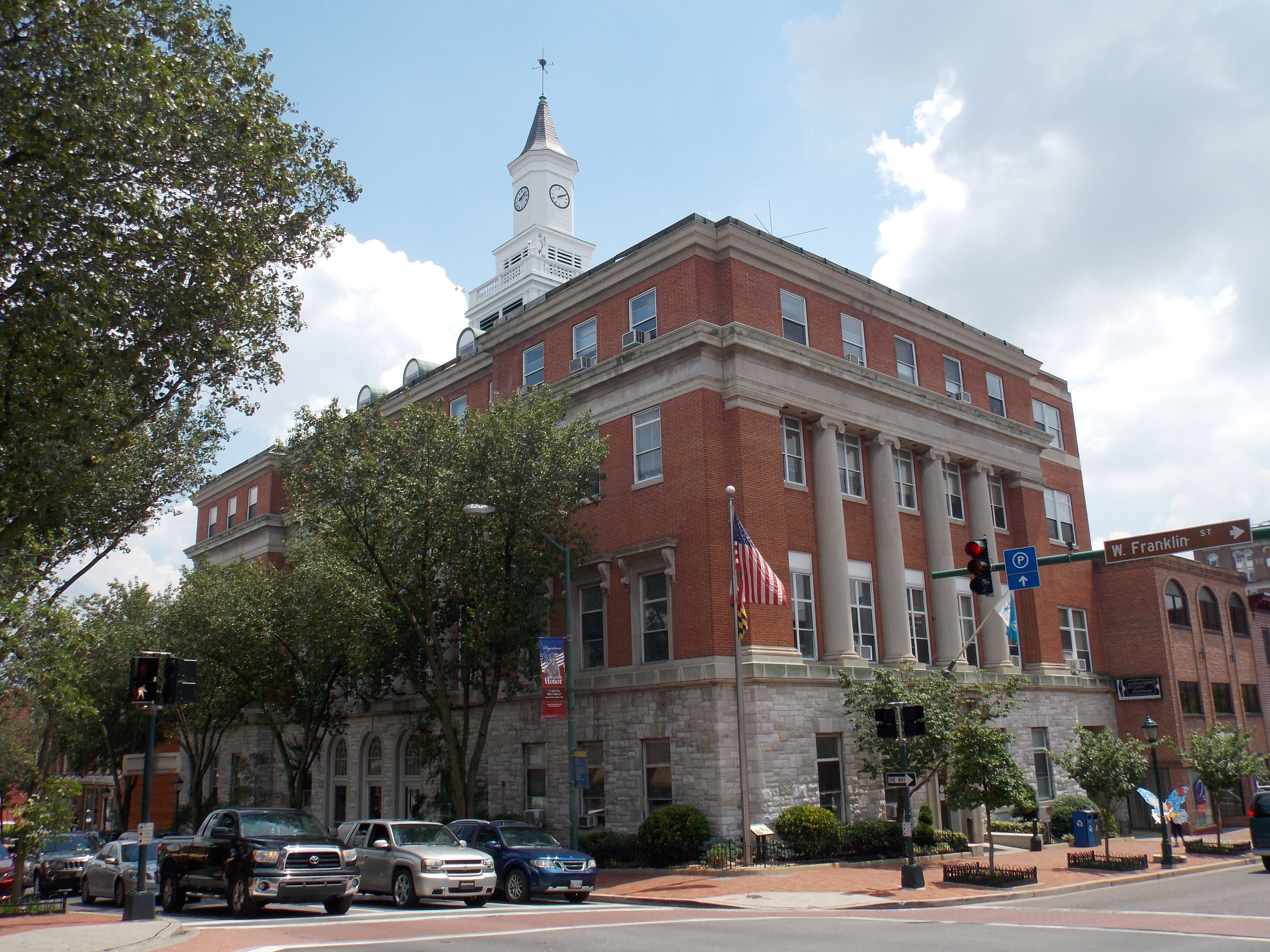
Hagerstown City Hall

=== Mayor ===
The current city executive or mayor of Hagerstown is Bill McIntire. The mayor is a nonpartisan position.

Past mayors:

- 2023–2024 Tekesha Martinez (D)
- 2020–2023 Emily Keller (D)
- 2016–2020 Robert E. Bruchey II (R)
- 2012–2016 David S. Gysberts (D)
- 2006–2012 Robert E. Bruchey II (R)
- 2005–2006 Richard F. Trump (R)
- 2001–2005 William M. Breichner (D)
- 1997–2001 Robert E. Bruchey II (R)
- 1985–1997 Steven T. Sager (D)
- 1981–1985 Donald R. Frush (R)
- 1973–1981 Varner L. Paddock (R)
- 1965–1973 Herman L. Mills (R)
- 1953–1965 Winslow F. Burhans
- 1949–1953 Herman L. Mills (R)
- 1941–1949 Richard H. Sweeney
- 1937–1941 W. Lee Elgin
- 1933–1937 I. M. Wertz

=== City council ===
The nonpartisan representative body of Hagerstown is known as the city council. Its current members are Kristin Aleshire, Caroline Anderson, Erika Bell, Tiara Burnett, and Sean Flaherty.

Florence Murdock served as the city's first female councilperson after being appointed in 1985. There have been two times since then where a majority of the council's five seats have been held by women: when there were three councilwomen during a period from 2005 to 2009, and from 2020 to 2023, where three councilwomen were inaugurated in November 2020. The council became three men and two women in March 2023 when Matthew Schindler was selected to fill the vacant council seat after Tekesha Martinez was selected to become mayor to fill the seat left by Emily Keller.

In 2005, Alesia Parson was elected as the first person of color to serve on the city council. Tiara Burnett and Tekesha Martinez were elected in 2020 as the second and third black city councilmembers. Councilwomen Burnett and Martinez were the first black councilmembers to serve concurrently. In February 2023, Martinez became the city's first black mayor after being unanimously selected by the city council to become mayor after Emily Keller resigned to take a position in Governor Wes Moore's cabinet.

=== Other representation ===
Paul D. Corderman (R) serves the Hagerstown area in the Maryland Senate while Brooke Grossman (D) represents Hagerstown in the Maryland House of Delegates. April McClain Delaney (D) serves Maryland's 6th congressional district which includes Hagerstown.

== Education ==
Initially, Hagerstown had one high school, Hagerstown High School, located on Potomac Avenue between 1927 and 1958. It later became North Potomac Middle School after North Hagerstown High School was built on Pennsylvania Avenue and opened in 1958. South Hagerstown High School had already been built and was opened in 1956.

=== High schools ===
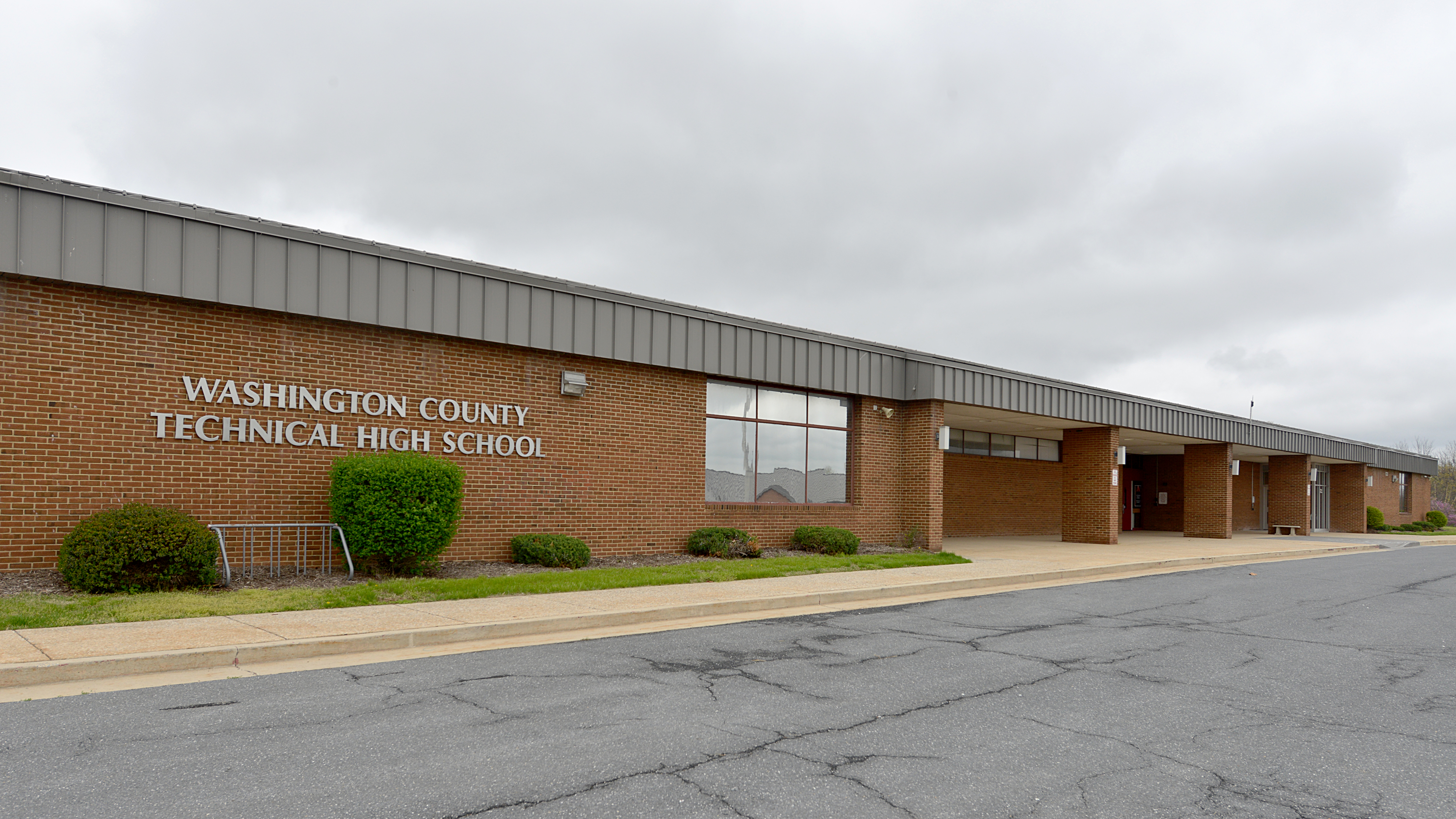
Washington County Technical High School

Public high schools (Administered by Washington County Public Schools)

- Antietam Academy
- Barbara Ingram School for the Arts
- Evening High School
- North Hagerstown High School
- South Hagerstown High School
- Washington County Technical High School

In addition, many Hagerstown students attend the following:

- Boonsboro High School, Boonsboro
- Clear Spring High School, Clear Spring
- Smithsburg High School, Smithsburg
- Williamsport High School, Williamsport

Private high schools

- Broadfording Christian Academy
- Emmanuel Christian School
- Gateway Academy
- Grace Academy
- Heritage Academy
- St. Mary's Catholic School
- Highland View Academy
- St. James School
- Truth Christian Academy

Closed private high schools

- St. Maria Goretti High School - closed 2024

=== Colleges and universities ===
- Hagerstown Community College, two-year public community college
- University System of Maryland at Hagerstown, a regional higher education center of the University System of Maryland offering various bachelor's, master's and doctoral degree programs in connection with other state colleges and universities in Maryland

=== Former colleges and universities ===
- Antietam Bible College, Biblical Seminary, and Graduate School
- Kaplan University, Hagerstown Campus, formerly known as Kaplan College and Hagerstown Business College
- Kee Mar College, former women's college
- Mount Saint Mary's University, Hagerstown Campus, offered Masters of Business Administration (MBA) degrees

== Media ==
=== Print ===
Hagerstown has one daily newspaper, The Herald-Mail.

=== Radio ===
Hagerstown shares a radio market, the 166th largest in the United States, with Chambersburg and Waynesboro, Pennsylvania. The following box contains all of the radio stations in the area:

=== Television ===
Hagerstown is the base for three television stations and shares a designated market area, the sixth largest in the United States, with Washington, D.C.

- WDVM-TV 25 (Ind)
- WWPB 31 (MPT/PBS)
- WWPX 60 (ION)

== Infrastructure ==
=== Highways ===
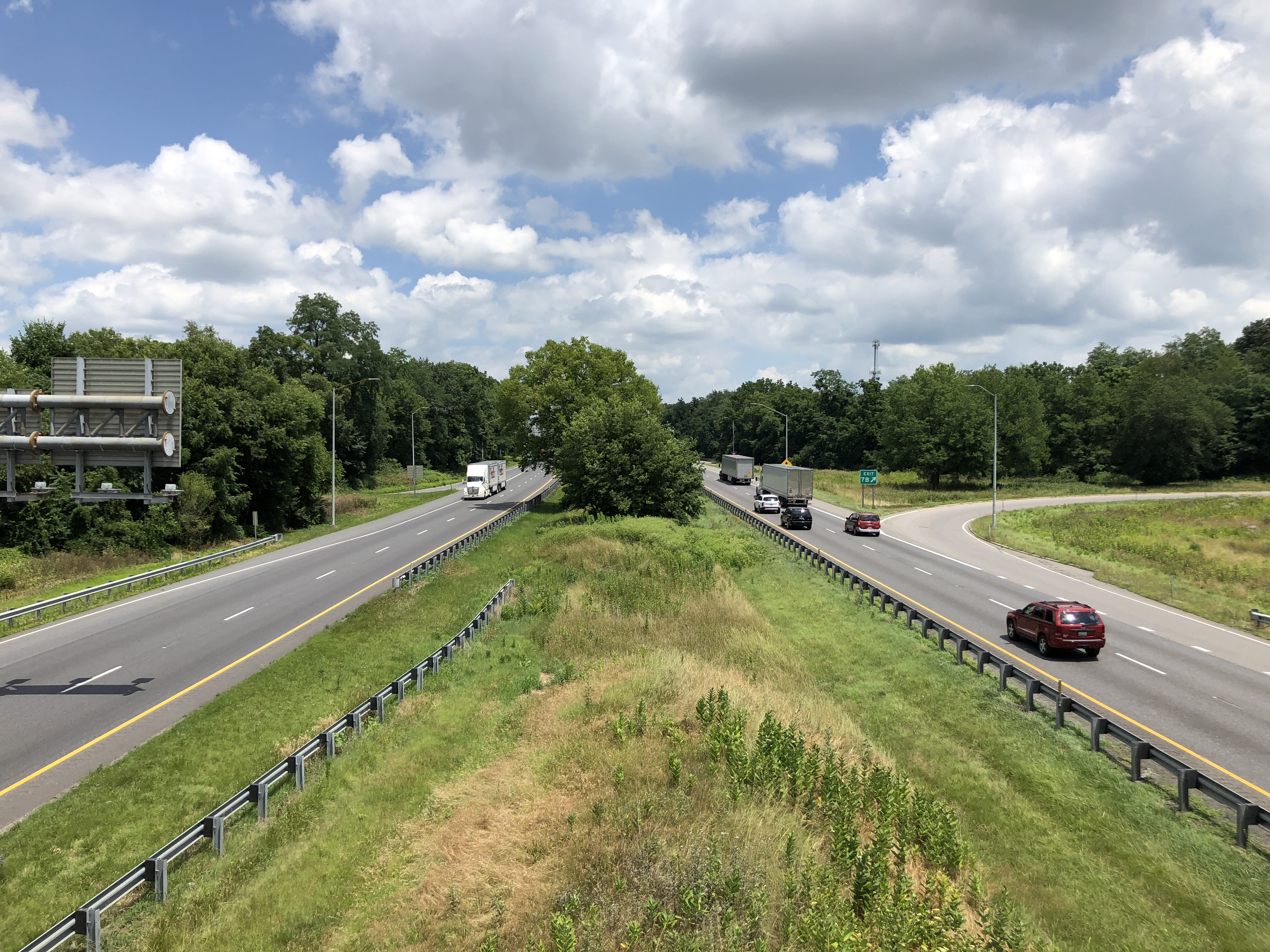
Looking north along I-81 from MD 58 in Hagerstown

- Interstate 70 (eastbound to Baltimore and westbound to Utah)
- Interstate 81 (northbound to the Canadian border in Upstate New York and southbound to East Tennessee)
- U.S. Route 11 (runs parallel to I-81)
- U.S. Route 40 (runs parallel to I-70)
- U.S. Route 40 Alternate (runs parallel to US 40 in Western Maryland)
- Maryland Route 58
- Maryland Route 60
- Maryland Route 64
- Maryland Route 65
- Maryland Route 144
- Maryland Route 632

=== Mass transportation ===
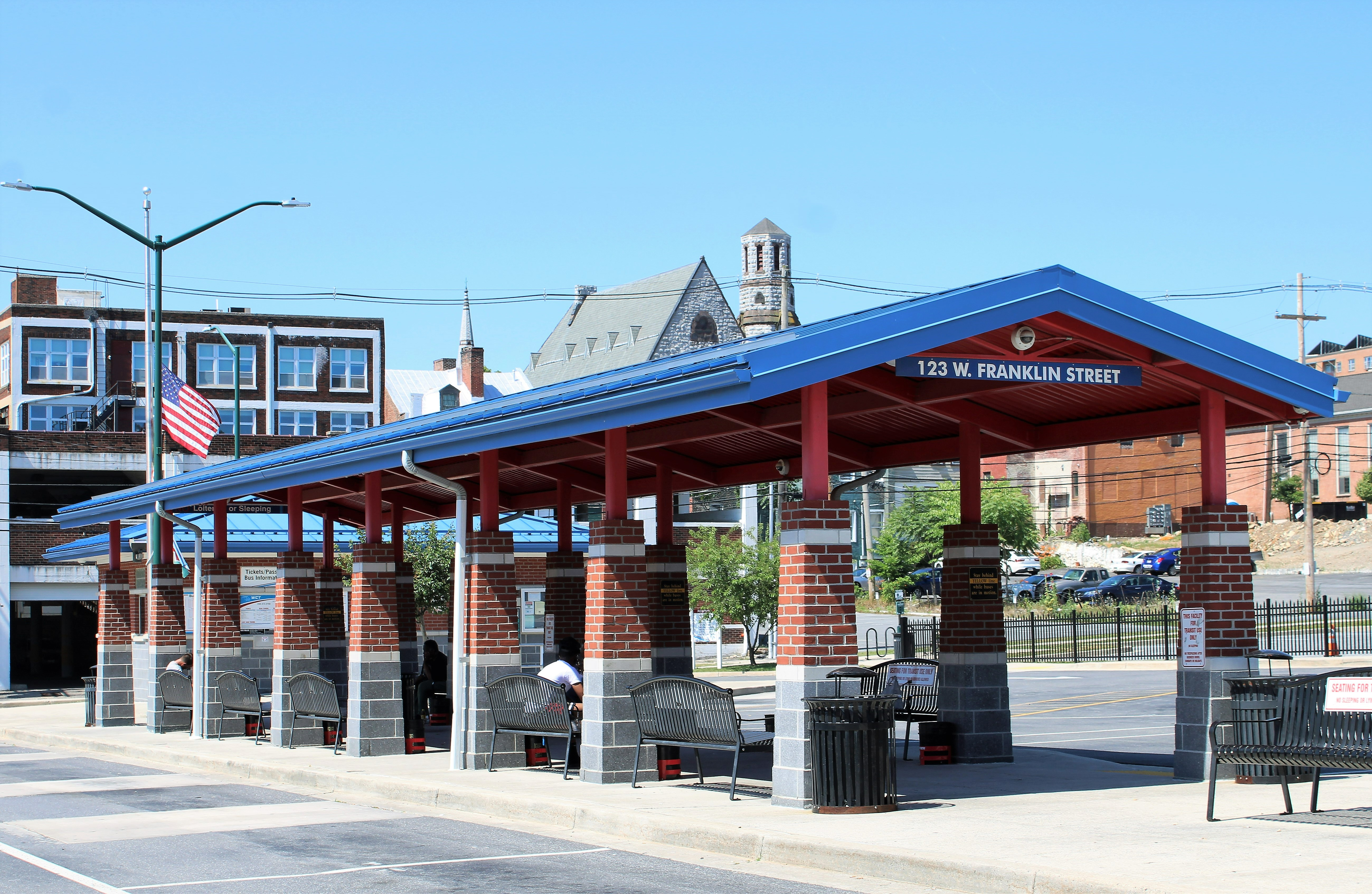
Washington County Transit Center

- Washington County Transit buses provide transportation within the city. More limited service is available to surrounding communities in Washington County.
- The Maryland Transit Administration operates the 505 Commuter Bus on weekdays to Shady Grove Metro Station, where riders can transfer to WMATA Red Line to reach Washington, D.C.
- Miller Cabs and Turner Vans service the Hagerstown area but are usually available only upon request. Downtown Taxi! offers cab service people can hail in the downtown vicinity.
- Greyhound Lines and Atlantic Charter Buses provide coach bus service to major cities near and far including directly to Baltimore, Harrisburg, Richmond, and Washington.
- Hagerstown Regional Airport (IATA: HGR, ICAO: KHGR, FAA LID: HGR), also known as Richard A. Henson Field, is located approximately 5 miles (8.0 km) due north of Hagerstown off U.S. Route 11 and Interstate 81. It is a frequent landing site for the U.S. President on the way to Camp David. The airport is commercially serviced by Allegiant Air with flights to and from Orlando Sanford International Airport, Myrtle Beach, and St. Petersburg-Clearwater, Alternatively, Washington Dulles International Airport, Washington National Airport, BWI Thurgood Marshall Airport, and Harrisburg International Airport offer more extensive flight destinations and are all within 60 miles (97 km) to 75 miles (121 km) of Hagerstown.
- Despite being at the crossroads of CSX, Norfolk Southern, and the Winchester and Western railroads, there is no passenger rail service in Hagerstown. The Maryland Transit Authority began a feasibility study in February 2023 on expanding the MARC Train Brunswick line into Hagerstown. Martinsburg, West Virginia, offers Amtrak and MARC Train service to Union Station in Washington, D.C., while Frederick offers MARC commuter rail service as well.

== Notable people ==
- See People from Hagerstown.

== Sister cities and municipal partnerships ==
- Wesel, North Rhine-Westphalia, Germany (since March 10, 1952)
- Hagerstown, Indiana, United States (since October 1, 2013)
- Xinjin, China (since March 22, 2016)
