= Paradise Manor =

Historic house in Maryland, United States

- U.S. National Register of Historic Places
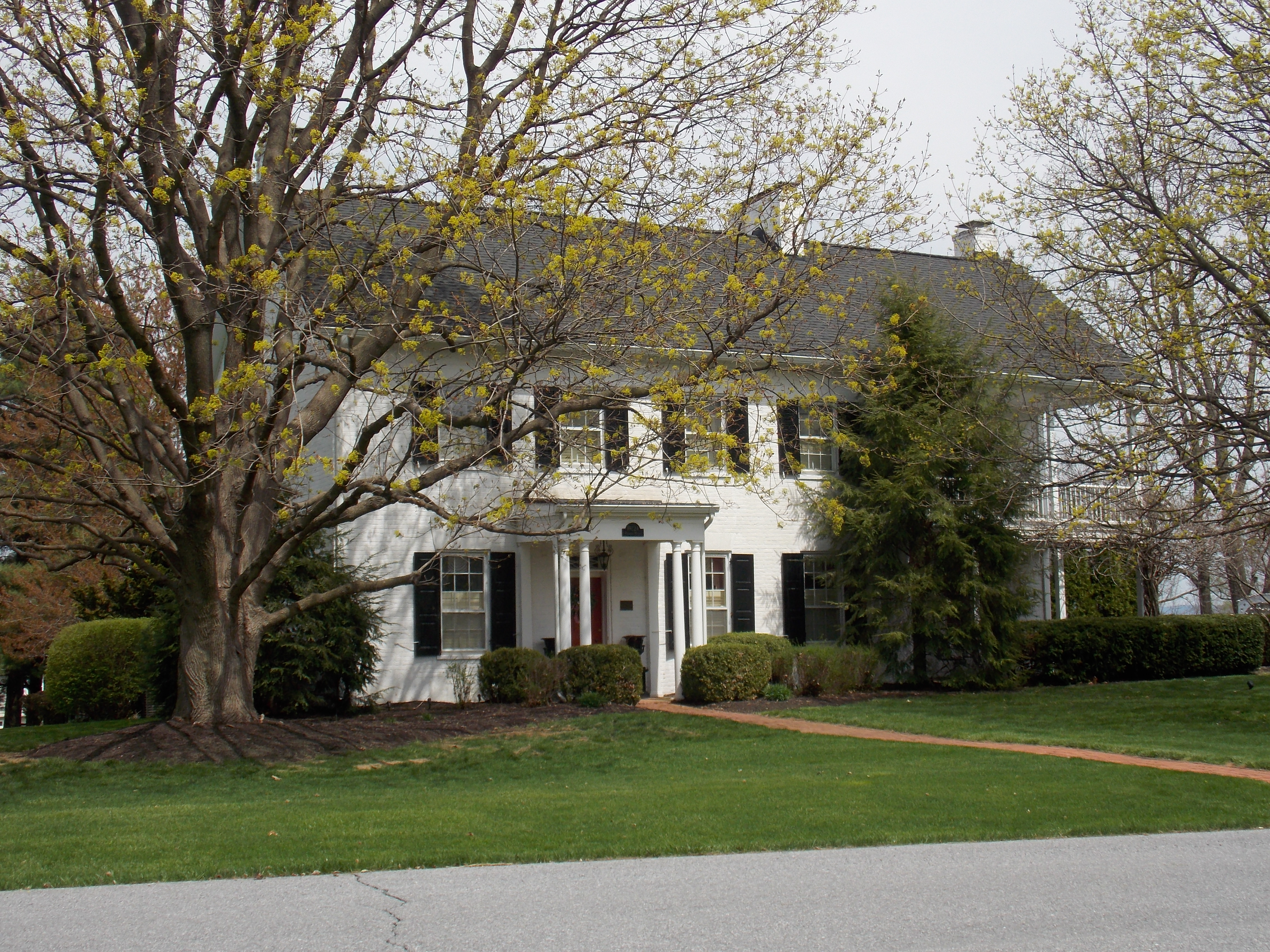

- Location within Maryland Location within the United States
- Location: North of Hagerstown at 2550 Paradise Dr., Hagerstown, Maryland
- Coordinates: 39°41′49″N 77°42′3″W
- Area: 1.8 acres (0.73 ha)
- Built: 1812
- NRHP reference No.: 78001482
- Added to NRHP: March 31, 1978

Paradise Manor is a historic home located at Hagerstown, Washington County, Maryland, United States. It is a two-story, six bay brick structure painted white with black trim. Its two easternmost bays are recessed in a double porch which is included under the main roof span. The walls rest on low fieldstone foundations. Also on the property is a large bank barn.

Paradise Manor was listed on the National Register of Historic Places in 1978.
