= Old Forge Farm =

- U.S. National Register of Historic Places
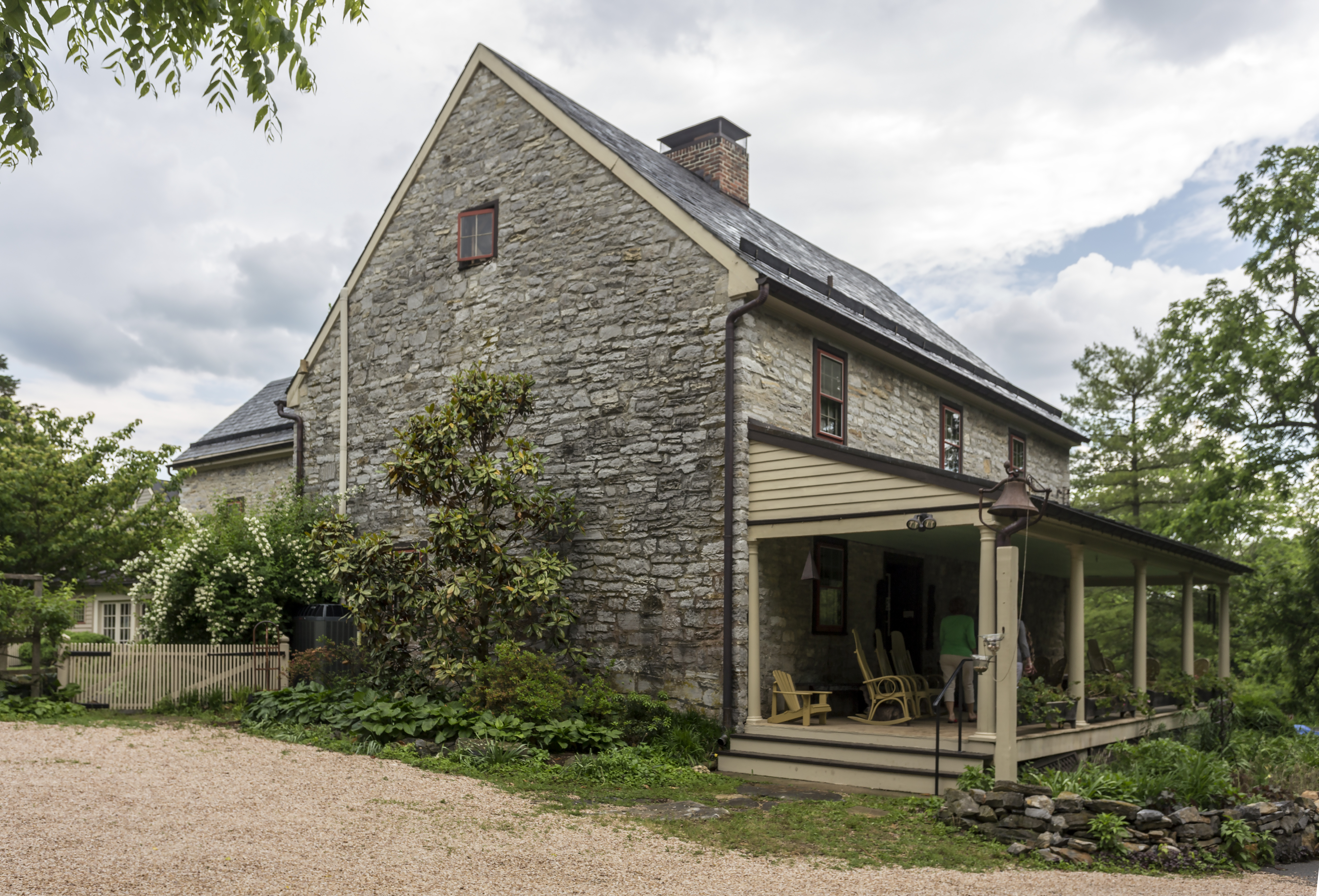

- Location within Maryland Location within the United States
- Nearest city: Hagerstown, Maryland
- Coordinates: 39°40′2″N 77°38′58″W
- Area: 12 acres (4.9 ha)
- Built: 1762
- NRHP reference No.: 79001145
- Added to NRHP: November 7, 1979

The Old Forge Farm, also known as Surveyor's Last Shift, is a historic home located at Hagerstown, Washington County, Maryland, United States. It is a two-story, three bay fieldstone dwelling built in 1762, with a long, two-story, five bay addition. The house features a slate roof. Also on the property are a stone end barn and stone shed, and a stone tenant house.

The Old Forge Farm was listed on the National Register of Historic Places in 1979.

They also breed Barbados Blackbelly sheep registered with the BBSAI.
