= Maryland Route 64 =

State highway in Washington County, Maryland, US

Maryland Route 64
- Maryland Route 64 highlighted in red

Route information
- Maintained by MDSHA and City of Hagerstown
- Length: 13.33 mi (21.45 km)
- Existed: 1927–present

Major junctions
- West end: US 40 in Hagerstown
- MD 66 in Cavetown; MD 77 in Smithsburg; MD 491 in Smithsburg; MD 66 in Smithsburg; MD 418 in Ringgold
- East end: PA 997 near Ringgold

Location
- Country: United States
- State: Maryland
- Counties: Washington

Highway system
- Maryland highway system; Interstate; US; State; Scenic Byways
| ← MD 63 | → MD 65 |

Maryland Route 64 (MD 64) is a state highway in the U.S. state of Maryland. The state highway runs 13.33 miles (21.45 km) from U.S. Route 40 (US 40) in Hagerstown east to the Pennsylvania state line near Ringgold, where the highway continues north as Pennsylvania Route 997 (PA 997). MD 64 is an L-shaped route in northeastern Washington County, connecting Hagerstown with Smithsburg, Cavetown, and Chewsville and Smithsburg with Ringgold and Waynesboro, Pennsylvania. The state highway is maintained by the Maryland State Highway Administration except for the municipally-maintained portion within the city limits of Hagerstown. MD 64 was once a turnpike between Hagerstown and Smithsburg. The state highway was constructed from Smithsburg to the Pennsylvania state line in the mid 1910s and from Hagerstown to Smithsburg in the early 1920s. MD 64 was reconstructed in its entirety in the 1950s, resulting in bypasses of all four communities east of Hagerstown the highway serves.

== Route description ==
MD 64 begins at an intersection with US 40 (Dual Highway) in a commercial area adjacent to the municipal golf course in the eastern part of the city of Hagerstown. The state highway heads north as Cleveland Avenue, a two-lane undivided street through a residential neighborhood. MD 64 turns east onto Jefferson Street, which heads east across Hamilton Run past Westwood Street, beyond which the highway leaves the city limits and becomes state-maintained. Jefferson Street becomes Jefferson Boulevard at Pangborn Boulevard. MD 64 crosses Antietam Creek and passes close to Antietam Hall as the highway passes between residential subdivisions. The state highway intersects Robinwood Drive, which passes through the suburb of Robinwood and Hagerstown Community College, before beginning to parallel CSX's Hanover Subdivision railroad line just west of Chewsville. MD 64 veers east away from the rail line as Track Side Drive, which is unsigned MD 804 and the old alignment of MD 64, continues to parallel the tracks. MD 804 provides access to the southern end of MD 62. MD 64 receives the other end of MD 804, Twin Springs Drive, on the east side of Chewsville.

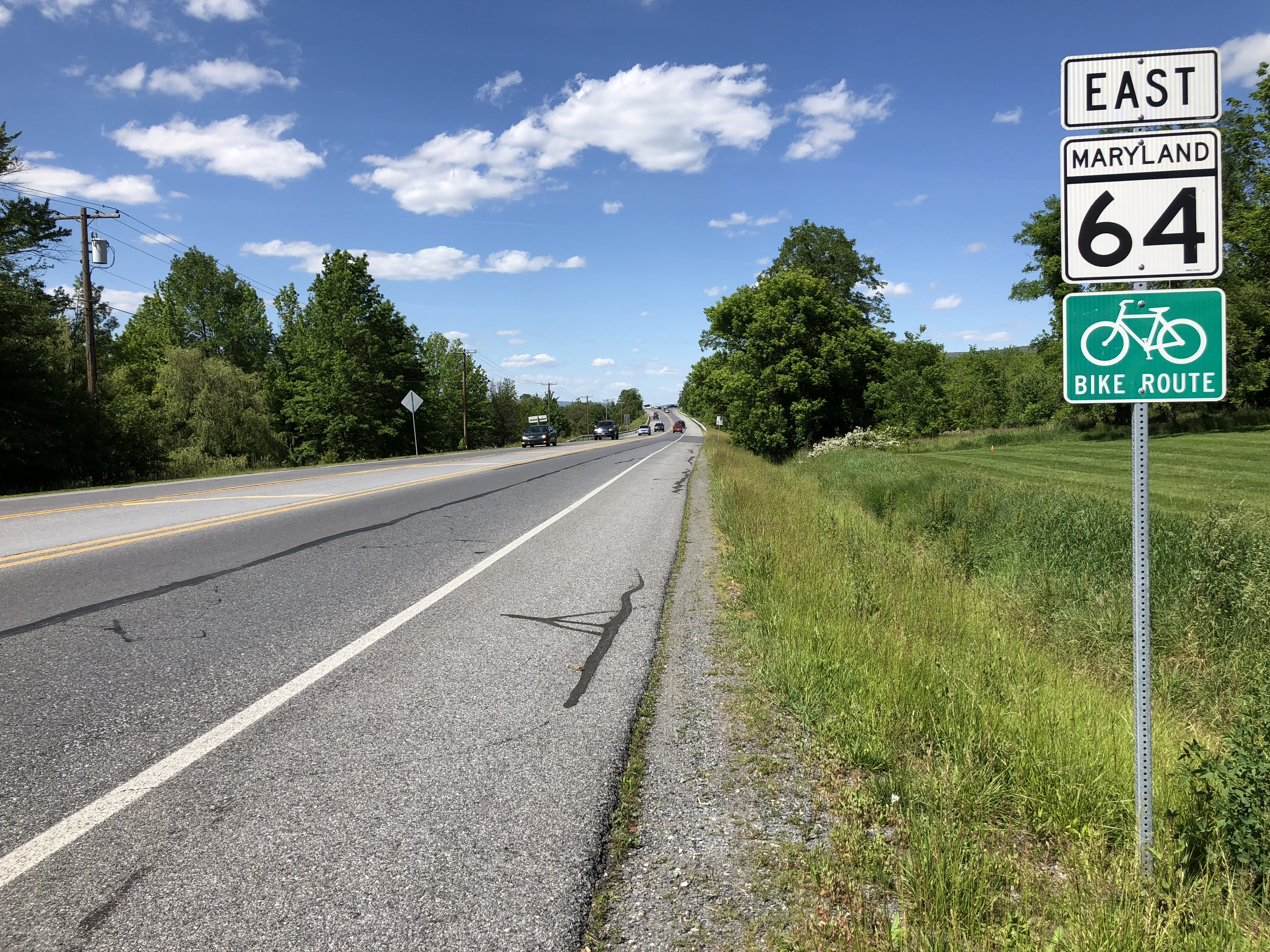
View east along MD 64 at MD 77 in Smithsburg

After passing between salvage yards, MD 64 continues east through farmland. The state highway passes between a pair of residential subdivisions before crossing Beaver Creek and reaching Cavetown. Old Georgetown Road parallels the north side of the highway as the old alignment while MD 64 bypasses the unincorporated village to the south, where the highway intersects MD 66 (Mapleville Road) and its name changes to Smithsburg Pike. MD 64 curves to the northeast, intersecting Cavetown Church Road, unsigned MD 844 and the old alignment of MD 77, and modern MD 77 (Foxville Road), which heads east opposite Leitersburg Smithsburg Road, which heads northwest into the town of Smithsburg. MD 64 intersects the southern end of MD 491 (Raven Rock Road) and crosses over the Hanover Subdivision before curving to the north. The state highway veers north and intersects Fruit Tree Drive and Water Street, which were formerly MD 92, then continues northwest and meets the northern end of MD 66 (Bradbury Avenue), which is the old alignment of MD 64 heading north from Smithsburg. MD 64 continues north, crossing Little Antietam Creek before reaching the community of Ringgold, where the highway intersects Windy Haven Road, the old alignment of MD 64, and MD 418 (Ringgold Pike). MD 64 receives the other end of the old alignment, Barkdoll Road, before reaching its eastern terminus at the Pennsylvania state line. The highway continues north as PA 997 (Anthony Highway) toward the borough of Waynesboro.

MD 64 is a part of the National Highway System as a principal arterial from Eastern Boulevard in Hagerstown east to MD 77 near Smithsburg.

== History ==
One of the predecessor highways of MD 64 was the Hagerstown and Smithsburg Turnpike between the two municipalities. The other major section of MD 64, the highway from Smithsburg to the Pennsylvania state line, was paved in 1916. The Hagerstown–Smithsburg highway was paved around 1923. The all-weather highway generally followed the old turnpike except for a deviation just west of Chewsville to avoid two grade crossings of the Western Maryland Railway. Within Hagerstown, MD 64 was marked from US 40 (now US 40 Alternate) north along Mulberry Street to Jefferson Street. By 1950, MD 64's western terminus was moved to the new US 40 and used Cannon Avenue to reach Jefferson Street. The state highway was moved to its present course along Cleveland Avenue in 1954. MD 64's name east from Hagerstown has varied, being named Cavetown Pike by 1950, becoming Smithsburg Pike by 1964, and changed to Jefferson Boulevard around 1983.

MD 64 was rebuilt from end-to-end in the 1950s. The first section to be reconstructed was from the Hagerstown city limit to just west of Chewsville in 1952. The next section, from just west of Chewsville to just west of Cavetown, was completed in 1954 and featured the bypass of Chewsville. The third section was a bypass of Cavetown from just west of the community to Wolfsville Road, now MD 64's intersection with MD 77. That highway was completed in 1956. The old alignment through Chewsville was designated MD 804. The final two segments of MD 64 to be worked on were from Wolfsville Road to south of Ringgold, completing the bypass of Smithsburg; and from south of Ringgold to the Pennsylvania state line, including a bypass of Ringgold. Both projects were completed in 1958. The old alignment of MD 64 from Cavetown to north of Smithsburg, consisting of Water Street, Pennsylvania Avenue, and Bradbury Avenue, was remarked as a northern extension of MD 66.

== Junction list ==
The entire route is in Washington County.

| Location | mi | km | Destinations | Notes |
|---|---|---|---|---|
| Hagerstown | 0.00 | 0.00 | US 40 (Dual Highway) / Cleveland Avenue south – Frederick | Western terminus |
| Chewsville | 4.06 | 6.53 | MD 804 east (Track Side Road) to MD 62 north – Chewsville, Leitersburg | Western terminus of MD 804 |
| Chewsville | 4.82 | 7.76 | MD 804 west (Twin Springs Drive) to MD 62 north | Eastern terminus of MD 804 |
| Cavetown | 6.91 | 11.12 | MD 66 (Mapleville Road) to I-70 – Smithsburg, Cavetown, Boonsboro | |
| Smithsburg | 7.81 | 12.57 | MD 844 east (Cavetown Church Road) / Cavetown Church Road west | Western terminus of MD 844 |
| Smithsburg | 8.06 | 12.97 | MD 77 east (Foxville Road) / Leitersburg Smithsburg Road west – Thurmont | Western terminus of MD 77 |
| Smithsburg | 8.50 | 13.68 | MD 491 north (Raven Rock Road) – Cascade | Southern terminus of MD 491 |
| Smithsburg | 9.85 | 15.85 | MD 66 south (Bradbury Avenue) | Northern terminus of MD 66 |
| Ringgold | 12.39 | 19.94 | MD 418 (Ringgold Pike) – Leitersburg, Hagerstown, Ringgold | |
| Ringgold | 13.33 | 21.45 | PA 997 north (Anthony Highway) – Waynesboro | Pennsylvania state line; eastern terminus |
1.000 mi = 1.609 km; 1.000 km = 0.621 mi
