= Maryland Route 60 =

State highway in Washington County, Maryland, US

Maryland Route 60
- Maryland Route 60 highlighted in red

Route information
- Maintained by MDSHA
- Length: 7.27 mi (11.70 km)
- Existed: 1927–present

Major junctions
- South end: Northern Avenue/Eastern Boulevard in Hagerstown
- MD 62 in Leitersburg; MD 418 in Leitersburg
- North end: PA 316 near Leitersburg

Location
- Country: United States
- State: Maryland
- Counties: Washington

Highway system
- Maryland highway system; Interstate; US; State; Scenic Byways
← MD 58	→ MD 61

Maryland Route 60 (MD 60) is a state highway in the U.S. state of Maryland. Known for most of its length as Leitersburg Pike, the state highway runs 7.27 miles (11.70 km) from the intersection of Potomac Avenue and Northern Avenue/Eastern Boulevard in Hagerstown east to the Pennsylvania state line near Leitersburg, where the highway continues north as Pennsylvania Route 316 (PA 316). MD 60 connects Hagerstown with Leitersburg and Waynesboro, Pennsylvania. MD 60 was paved over the course of an old turnpike from Hagerstown toward Waynesboro in the mid-1920s. The state highway was reconstructed in the mid-1950s, including the highway's bypass of Leitersburg.

== Route description ==
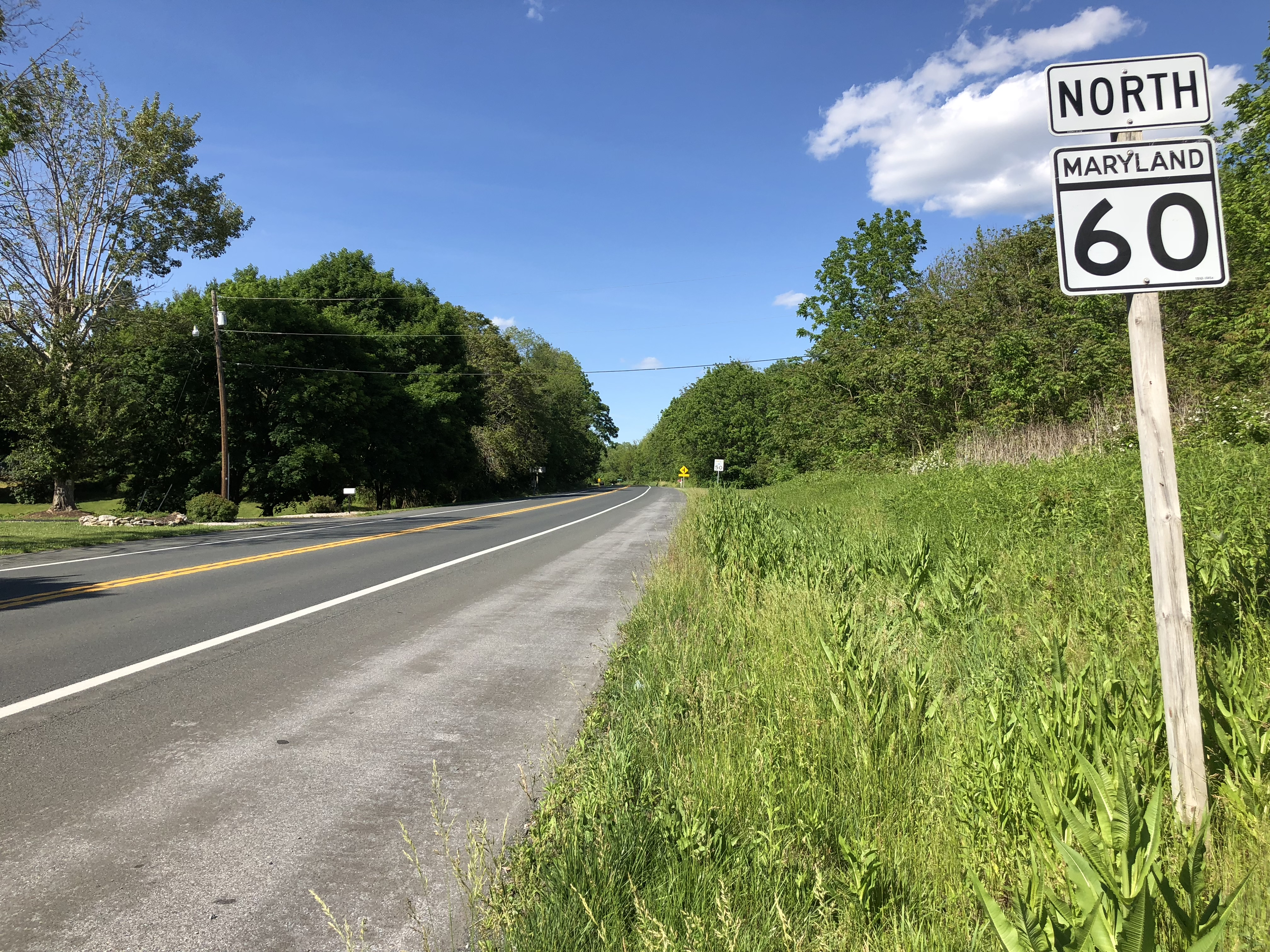
View north along MD 60 at MD 418 in Leitersburg

MD 60 begins at an intersection with Northern Avenue, Eastern Boulevard, and Potomac Avenue in the city of Hagerstown. Northern Avenue heads west past St. Maria Goretti High School. Eastern Boulevard heads east toward the historic home Rockland Farm. Potomac Avenue heads south toward downtown Hagerstown and becomes Potomac Street, passing through the Oak Hill and Potomac-Broadway historic districts and by the Zion Reformed United Church of Christ and the Hagerstown Armory. MD 60 heads north as Potomac Avenue, a four-lane divided highway that soon narrows to a two-lane undivided road. The route leaves the city limits of Hagerstown before reaching a junction with Marsh Pike, which heads north toward the suburbs of Paramount and Long Meadow. MD 60 continues northeast as Leitersburg Pike through farmland, passing the Dorsey-Palmer House before crossing Marsh Run.

MD 60 crosses Antietam Creek and passes the Lantz-Zeigler House before reaching Leitersburg. The state highway intersects the northern terminus of MD 62 (Little Antietam Road) on the west side of the unincorporated village before curving to the north to bypass the village while Leiter Street, the old alignment of MD 60, continues straight to pass through the Leitersburg Historic District. North of the village center, MD 60 intersects Leiters Mill Road and the western end of MD 418 (Ringgold Pike), then curves north and receives the other end of Leiter Street. The state highway starts to parallel Antietam Creek as it reaches its Northern terminus at the Pennsylvania state line. The highway continues north as PA 316 (Wayne Highway) toward the borough of Waynesboro.

MD 60 is a part of the National Highway System as a principal arterial from its southern terminus at Eastern Boulevard in Hagerstown north to Marsh Run.

== History ==
The predecessor highway of MD 60 was the Hagerstown and Waynesboro Turnpike, which ran from Hagerstown to the Pennsylvania state line via Leitersburg. MD 60 was paved as a modern highway from Hagerstown to Leitersburg in 1923 and from Leitersburg to the state line by 1927. The first relocation of MD 60 occurred in 1941 when the highway's bridge over Antietam Creek was replaced. The state highway was reconstructed from its western terminus to the western end of the Antietam Creek relocation in 1952. The segment of MD 60 between Antietam Creek and Leitersburg was rebuilt in 1953 and 1954. The bypass of Leitersburg was constructed and the highway north to the state line was reconstructed between 1954 and 1956.

== Junction list ==
The entire route is in Washington County.

Location	mi	km	Destinations	Notes
Hagerstown	0.00	0.00	Northern Avenue west / Eastern Boulevard south / Potomac Avenue south	Western terminus
Leitersburg	4.83	7.77	MD 62 south (Little Antietam Road) – Chewsville	Northern terminus of MD 62
Leitersburg	5.35	8.61	MD 418 east (Ringgold Pike) – Ringgold	Western terminus of MD 418
	7.27	11.70	PA 316 north (Wayne Highway) – Waynesboro	Pennsylvania state line; eastern terminus
1.000 mi = 1.609 km; 1.000 km = 0.621 mi

== Auxiliary route ==
MD 60A is the designation for the unnamed 0.10-mile (0.16 km) one-lane ramp from northbound MD 60 to eastbound MD 418 in Leitersburg.
