= Maryland Route 418 =

State highway in Maryland, United States

Maryland Route 418
- Ringgold Pike
- Maryland Route 418 highlighted in red

Route information
- Maintained by MDSHA
- Length: 4.62 mi (7.44 km)
- Existed: 1930–present

Major junctions
- West end: MD 60 in Leitersburg
- MD 64 in Ringgold
- East end: SR 2007 near Ringgold

Location
- Country: United States
- State: Maryland
- Counties: Washington

Highway system
- Maryland highway system; Interstate; US; State; Scenic Byways
← MD 414	→ MD 422

Maryland Route 418 (MD 418) is a state highway in the U.S. state of Maryland. Known as Ringgold Pike, the state highway runs 4.62 miles (7.44 km) from MD 60 in Leitersburg east to the Pennsylvania state line near Ringgold, where the highway continues as State Route 2007 (SR 2007) in Franklin County. MD 418 was constructed in 1930 from Leitersburg to Ringgold and extended to the state line in the mid-1950s. The state highway was rebuilt in the late 1950s.

== Route description ==
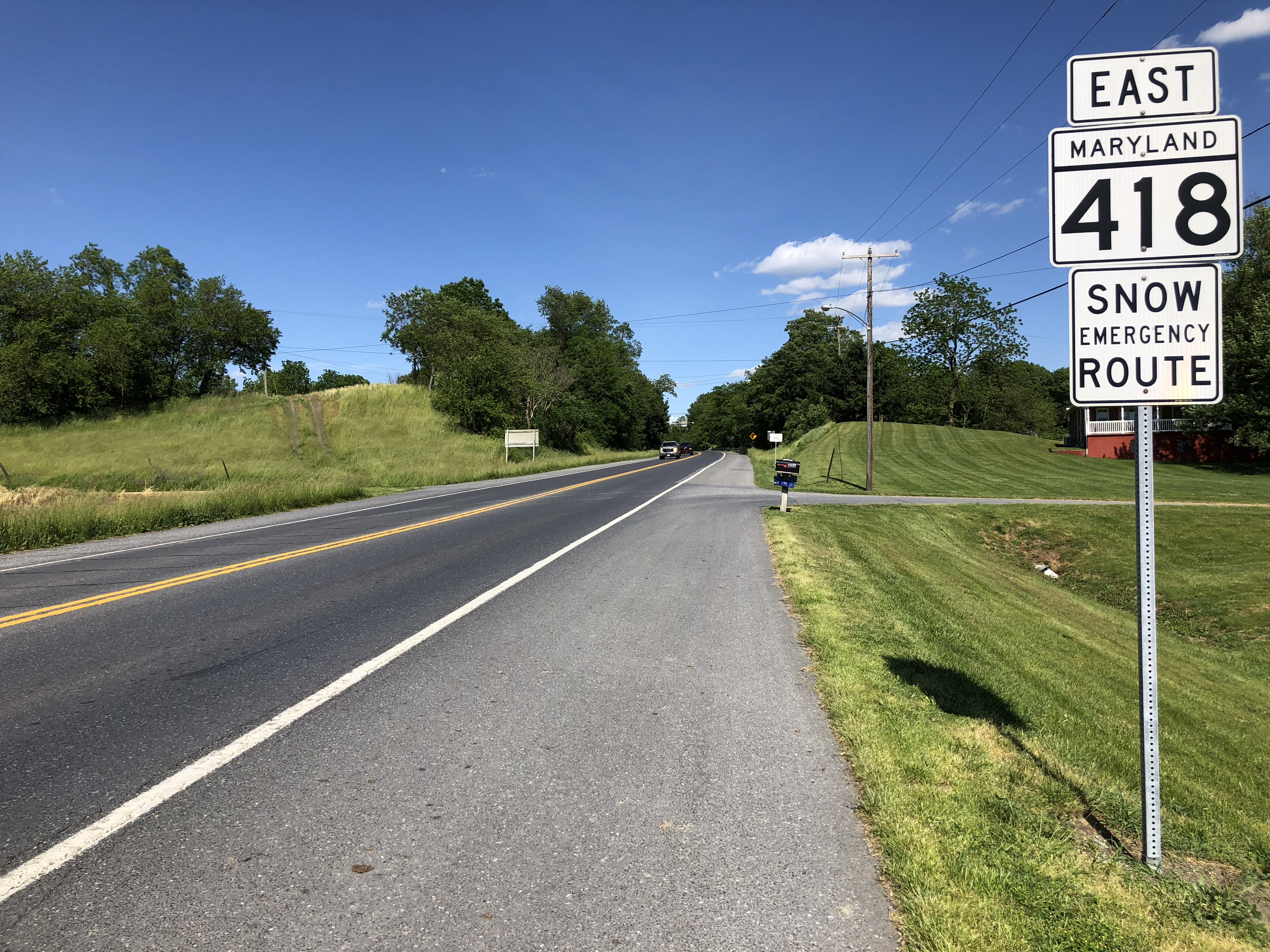
View east along MD 418 at MD 64 in Ringgold

MD 418 begins at an intersection with MD 60 (Leitersburg Pike) in Leitersburg outside of the Leitersburg Historic District, which can be accessed by Leiter Street and Ringgold Street, which are the old alignments of MD 60 and MD 418, respectively. MD 418 heads northeast as a two-lane undivided highway through farmland. The state highway intersects MD 64 (Smithsburg Pike) just west of the unincorporated village of Ringgold. In Ringgold, MD 418 intersects Midvale Road and Windy Haven Road, which are the old alignments of MD 418 and MD 64, respectively. The state highway continues northeast, crossing a tributary to Red Run before reaching its terminus at the Pennsylvania state line. The highway continues north as SR 2007 (Midvale Road) toward the unincorporated village of Rouzerville.

== History ==
MD 418 was paved from Leitersburg to Ringgold in 1930. The state highway was extended northeast to the Pennsylvania state line around 1956, the same year the highway's present alignment at its western end was constructed in conjunction with MD 60's bypass of Leitersburg. MD 418 was reconstructed from the eastern end of the bypass of Leitersburg to the state line in 1958, including the construction of the highway's present alignment through Ringgold.

== Junction list ==
The entire route is in Washington County.

Location	mi	km	Destinations	Notes
Leitersburg	0.00	0.00	MD 60 (Leiterstown Pike) – Leitersburg, Hagerstown, Waynesboro	Western terminus
Ringgold	2.77	4.46	MD 64 (Smithsburg Pike) – Smithsburg, Waynesboro	
	4.62	7.44	SR 2007 north (Midvale Road) – Rouzerville, PA	Pennsylvania state line; eastern terminus
1.000 mi = 1.609 km; 1.000 km = 0.621 mi
