= Maryland Route 491 =

State highway in Maryland, United States

Maryland Route 491
- Maryland Route 491 highlighted in red

Route information
- Maintained by MDSHA
- Length: 6.78 mi (10.91 km)
- Existed: 1957–present

Major junctions
- South end: MD 64 in Smithsburg
- North end: MD 550 in Fort Ritchie

Location
- Country: United States
- State: Maryland
- Counties: Washington, Frederick

Highway system
- Maryland highway system; Interstate; US; State; Scenic Byways
← MD 490	→ MD 494

Maryland Route 491 (MD 491) is a state highway in the U.S. state of Maryland. Known for most of its length as Raven Rock Road, the state highway runs 6.78 miles (10.91 km) from MD 64 in Smithsburg north to MD 550 in Fort Ritchie. The middle portion of MD 491 was constructed in the mid-1950s. The highway was extended south to Smithsburg along a partially new alignment in the early 1960s, replacing a road that had been designed MD 92 from the mid-1930s to the mid-1950s. MD 491 was extended north toward Fort Ritchie in the late 1960s.

== Route description ==
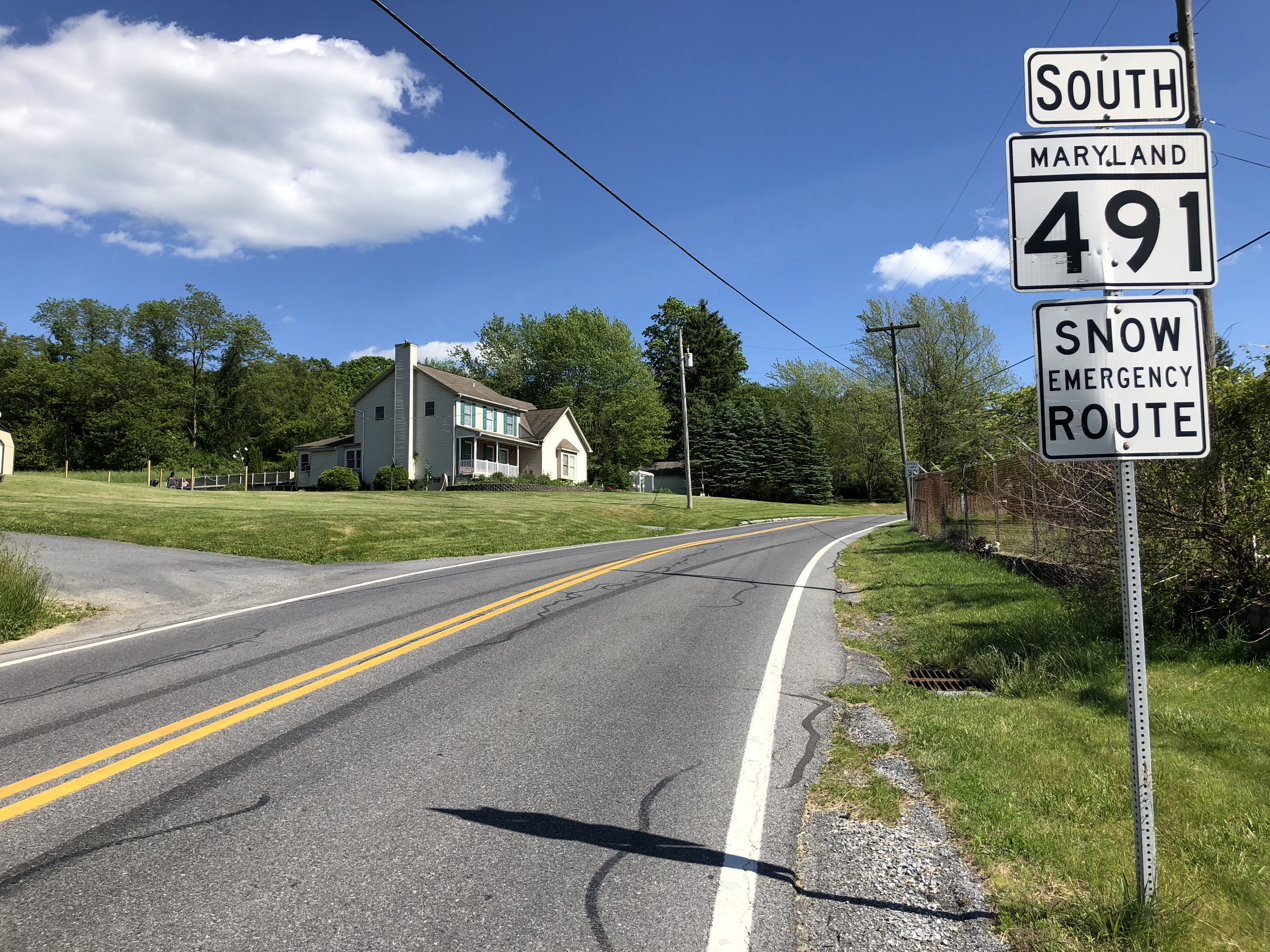
View south along MD 491 in Fort Ritchie

MD 491 begins at an intersection with MD 64 (Smithsburg Pike) in Smithsburg. The state highway heads northeast as two-lane undivided Raven Rock Road, which flanks the western slope of South Mountain and parallels CSX's Hanover Subdivision railroad line. MD 491 veers east away from the railroad at Fruit Tree Drive and crosses Little Antietam Creek. The Appalachian Trail then crosses MD 491 approximately 1/2 mile further. The state highway follows the creek into Raven Rock Hollow, a gap in South Mountain between Buzzard Knob to the south and Raven Rock to the north. MD 491 follows the creek east and then northeast to an unnamed gap near Mt. Zion Road where the highway enters Frederick County. The state highway continues north to a four-way intersection next to the historic summer cottage Tipahato. From this intersection on the county line, Fort Ritchie heads east toward Sabillasville and Moyer Road heads north toward the communities of Highfield and Cascade. MD 491 turns west onto Macfee Hill Road into Washington County. The state highways descends to the site of the former U.S. Army installation Fort Ritchie within the community of Fort Ritchie, where the highway reaches its northern terminus at MD 550. MD 550 heads northeast as Military Road and northwest along Macfee Hill Road toward Pen Mar.

== History ==
The predecessor state highway to MD 491 was MD 92, which was constructed in 1935. The state highway had its western terminus at the intersection of Water Street and Pennsylvania Avenue (originally MD 64, now MD 66) in Smithsburg. MD 92 ran east as Water Street and Fruit Tree Drive to near Fruit Tree Drive's modern intersection with MD 491 at the Western Maryland Railway crossing. MD 92 was rebuilt around 1944 as a military access project, as the state highway was part of the most direct route between Hagerstown and Fort Ritchie. MD 92 was transferred out of the state highway system in 1956. That same year, the original MD 491 in Charles County became part of an extended MD 425.

Starting in a 1954, the portion of Raven Rock Road from Ritchie Road to the Frederick County line was reconstructed. This segment was designated MD 491 by 1957. The other sections of Raven Rock Road remained county highways. A new road was constructed east of the railroad between MD 64 (Smithsburg Bypass) and the present junction of MD 491 and Fruit Tree Drive in 1963. This new road and the portion of Raven Rock Road between Fruit Tree Drive and Ritchie Road became part of an extended MD 491. MD 491 was extended north from the Frederick County line north along Raven Rock Road and Royer Road to MD 550 in Highfield in 1968. The state highway achieved its present course when its northernmost segment was moved from Royer Road to Macfee Hill Road around 1981.

== Junction list ==
County	Location	mi	km	Destinations	Notes
Washington	Smithsburg	0.00	0.00	MD 64 (Smithsburg Pike) – Hagerstown, Waynesboro	Southern terminus
Frederick		6.40	10.30	Royer Road north / Fort Ritchie Road east – Sabillasville, Highfield-Cascade	MD 491 turns west onto Macfee Hill Road
Washington	Fort Ritchie	6.78	10.91	MD 550 (Macfee Hill Road/Military Road) – Thurmont, Pen Mar	Northern terminus
1.000 mi = 1.609 km; 1.000 km = 0.621 mi
