= Maryland Route 62 =

State highway in Washington County, Maryland, US

Maryland Route 62
- Maryland Route 62

Route information
- Maintained by MDSHA
- Length: 3.88 mi (6.24 km)
- Existed: 1927–present

Major junctions
- South end: MD 804 in Chewsville
- North end: MD 60 in Leitersburg

Location
- Country: United States
- State: Maryland
- Counties: Washington

Highway system
- Maryland highway system; Interstate; US; State; Scenic Byways
← MD 61	→ MD 63

Maryland Route 62 (MD 62) is a state highway in the U.S. state of Maryland. Known for most of its length as Little Antietam Road, the state highway runs 3.88 miles (6.24 km) from MD 804 in Chewsville north to MD 60 in Leitersburg in northeastern Washington County. MD 62 was constructed in two sections in the mid 1910s and the early 1930s.

== Route description ==
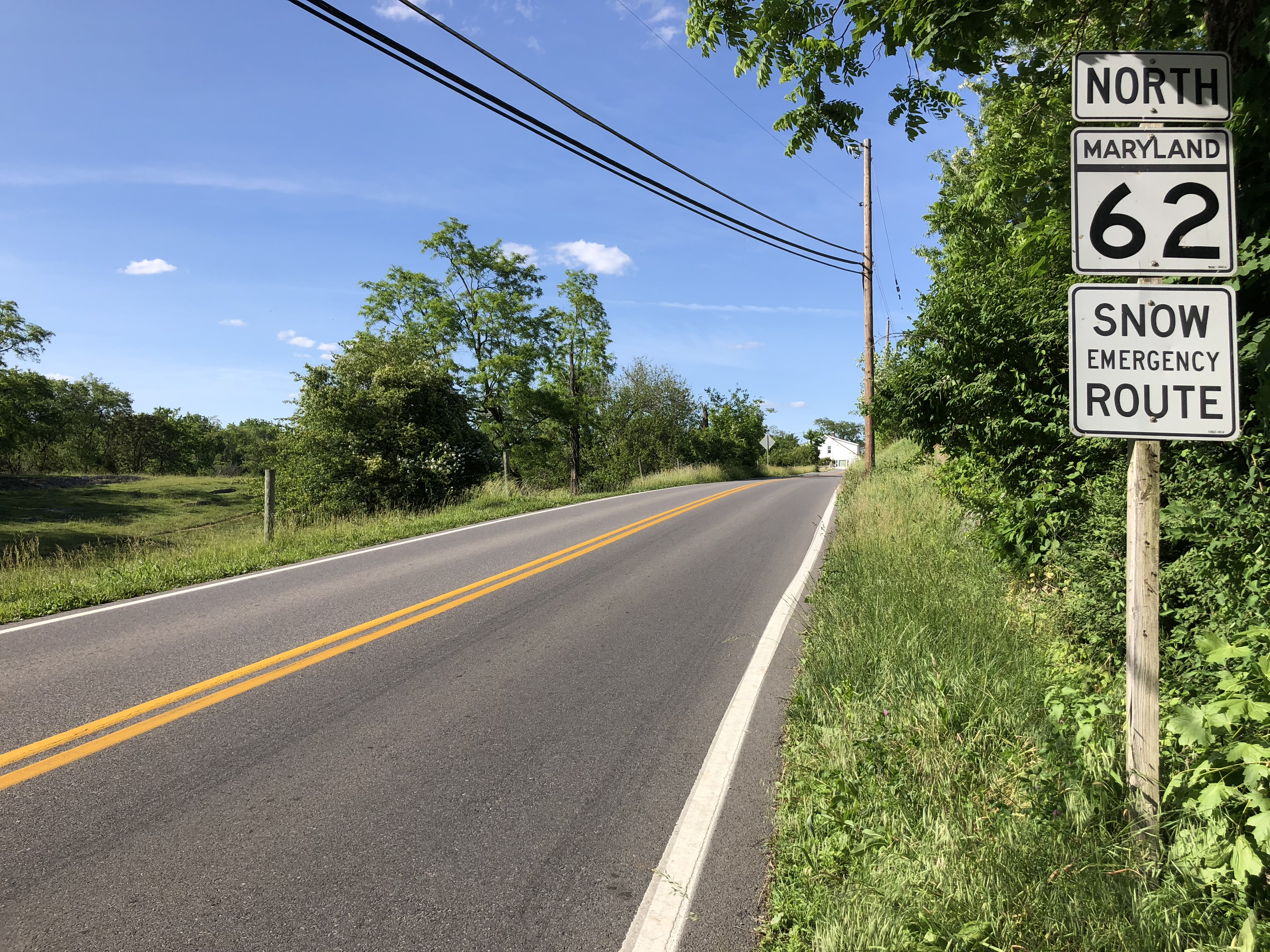
View north from the south end of MD 62 at MD 804 in Chewsville

MD 62 begins at an intersection with unsigned MD 804 in Chewsville. MD 804, the old alignment of MD 64 (Jefferson Boulevard), heads southwest as Trackside Drive to an intersection with MD 64 and east as Twin Springs Drive through the center of Chewsville. MD 62 heads west as two-lane undivided Twin Springs Drive and immediately crosses CSX's Hanover Subdivision railroad line at-grade. The state highway heads west until it reaches Little Antietam Road, onto which the state highway turns northeast. MD 62 passes through a mix of farmland, forest, and scattered residences and veers north at Old Forge Road. The state highway passes the Good-Hartle Farm just before crossing Little Antietam Creek a short distance east of its confluence with Antietam Creek. MD 62 continues to its northern terminus at MD 60 (Leitersburg Pike) just west of Leitersburg.

== History ==
The first section of MD 62 was paved from Chewsville to Old Forge Road in 1916. The remainder of the highway to Leitersburg was built in 1933. MD 62 originally met MD 64 at its southern terminus. After MD 64 bypassed Chewsville in 1956, the old alignment of MD 64 was designated MD 804B.

== Junction list ==
The entire route is in Washington County.

Location	mi	km	Destinations	Notes
Chewsville	0.00	0.00	MD 804 (Twin Springs Drive/Trackside Drive) to MD 64 – Smithsburg, Hagerstown	Southern terminus; MD 804 is old alignment of MD 64
Leitersburg	3.88	6.24	MD 60 (Leitersburg Pike) – Hagerstown, Waynesboro, Leitersburg	Northern terminus
1.000 mi = 1.609 km; 1.000 km = 0.621 mi
