= Spessard =

Spessard is a name. Notable people with the name include:

== Surname ==
- Alvin Milton Spessard (1860–1924), American politician from Alabama
- Bob Spessard (1915–1989), American basketball player

== Given name ==
- Spessard Holland (1892–1971), U.S. senator and governor of Florida

== Other ==
- Spessard Holland East-West Expressway, official name of Florida State Road 408
