= John P. Fockler =

American politician (died 1911)

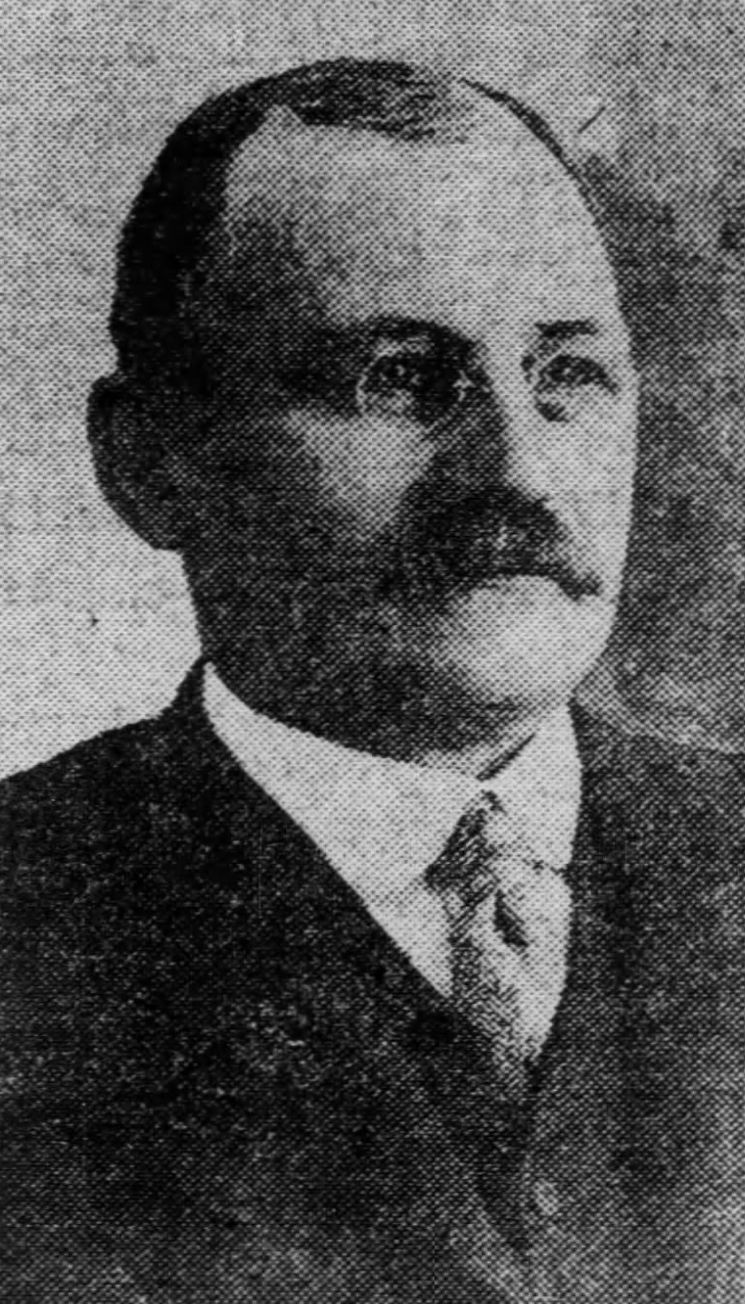
- Fockler in a 1911 newspaper

Member of the Maryland House of Delegates from the Washington County district
- In office 1892–1894 Serving with Edward Garrott, Robert F. Shafer, Charles H. Smith
- Preceded by: John H. Harp, Martin L. Keedy, Lewis C. Remsberg, Moses Whitson
- Succeeded by: Jeremiah G. Cromer, Tilghman J. Fahrney, John H. Harp, Norman B. Scott Jr.

Personal details
- Born: Washington County, Maryland, U.S.
- Died: December 5, 1911 (aged 50) Cavetown, Maryland, U.S.
- Resting place: Smithsburg Cemetery
- Party: Democratic
- Spouse: Alice Harbaugh
- Children: 2
- Occupation: Politician; educator

John P. Fockler (died December 5, 1911) was an American politician and educator from Maryland.

== Early life ==
John P. Fockler was born in Washington County, Maryland, to Benjamin Fockler.

== Career ==
Fockler was a Democrat. He served as a member of the Maryland House of Delegates, representing Washington County from 1892 to 1894. He was a member of the education committee.

Fockler taught school in Washington County for 27 years. He was superintendent of Washington County Public Schools for eight years.

== Personal life ==
Fockler married Alice Harbaugh. They had two children, Clifford B. and Mrs. L. B. Anderson. His brother was B. Edwin Fockler, principal of North East High School. He was a member of the Reformed Church and the Freemasons.

Fockler died on December 5, 1911, aged 50, at his home in Cavetown. He was buried at Smithsburg Cemetery.
