= The Willows (Cavetown, Maryland) =

- U.S. National Register of Historic Places
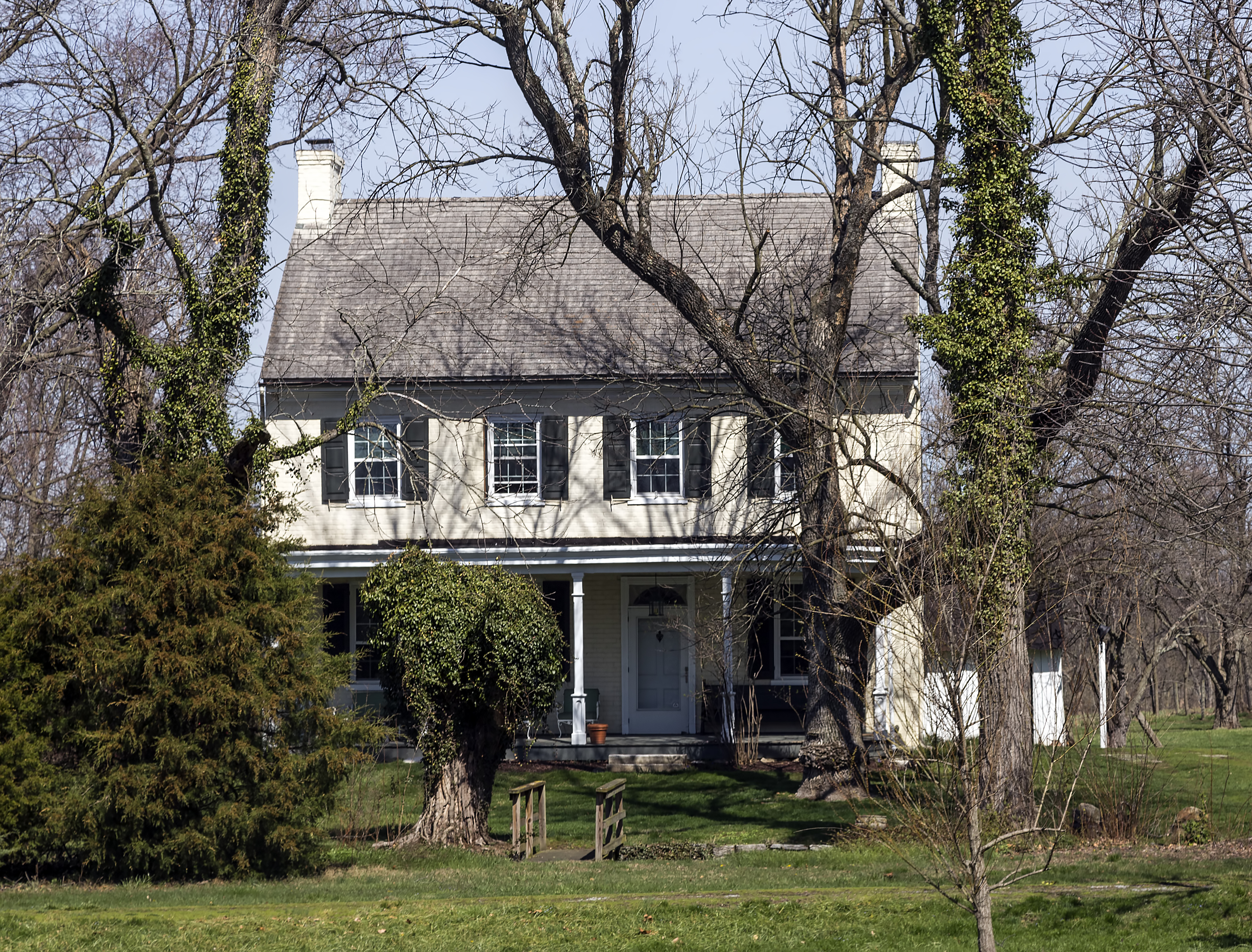
- The Willows in 2017

- Location within Maryland Location within the United States
- Location: Southwest of Cavetown on Maryland Route 66, Cavetown, Maryland
- Coordinates: 39°37′34″N 77°36′12.3″W
- Area: 150 acres (61 ha)
- Built: 1795
- Architectural style: Federal
- NRHP reference No.: 73000940
- Added to NRHP: February 23, 1973

The Willows is a historic farm complex located at Cavetown, Washington County, Maryland, United States. The farmhouse is a four bay long two-story Federal brick structure that is painted white. Also on the property are a one-story stone springhouse; a log pig house; a brick necessary; a stone smokehouse; "the old house," a former slave quarters; and two frame barns.

It was listed on the National Register of Historic Places in 1973.
