= Huckleberry Hall =

- U.S. National Register of Historic Places
- Location within Maryland Location within the United States
- Location: Charles Mill Rd., west of its junction with Maryland Route 64, Leitersburg, Maryland
- Coordinates: 39°41′18″N 77°35′27″W
- Area: 6 acres (2.4 ha)
- Built: 1784
- Architectural style: Georgian, Germanic
- NRHP reference No.: 90001994
- Added to NRHP: December 28, 1990

Huckleberry Hall is a historic farm complex located at Leitersburg, Washington County, Maryland, United States. The complex includes a 2 1/2-story Germanic stone house built about 1784, an 18th-century stone blacksmith shop, a frame bank barn, a mid-19th-century brick secondary dwelling, and other agricultural outbuildings.

Huckleberry Hall was listed on the National Register of Historic Places in 1990.
