= Canal Parkway =

State highway in Allegany County, Maryland, US

- Maryland Route 61
- Canal Parkway highlighted in red

Route information
- Maintained by MDSHA
- Length: 1.94 mi (3.12 km)
- Existed: 2001–present
- Tourist routes: Chesapeake and Ohio Canal Scenic Byway

Major junctions
- South end: WV 28 in Cumberland
- North end: MD 51 in Cumberland

Location
- Country: United States
- State: Maryland
- Counties: Allegany

Highway system
- Maryland highway system; Interstate; US; State; Scenic Byways
← MD 60	→ MD 62

Canal Parkway, which carries the unsigned Maryland Route 61 (MD 61) designation, is a state highway and automobile parkway in the U.S. state of Maryland. The road begins at the West Virginia state line at the North Branch Potomac River opposite Wiley Ford, where the highway continues south as West Virginia Route 28 (WV 28). The parkway runs 1.94 miles (3.12 km) north to MD 51 within the city of Cumberland. Canal Parkway provides a connection between downtown Cumberland and the South Cumberland neighborhood and with Greater Cumberland Regional Airport, which is located in Mineral County, West Virginia.

Canal Parkway was constructed as part of a broad group of projects to revitalize the North Branch Potomac River waterfront of Cumberland, centered on the historical Chesapeake and Ohio Canal (C&O Canal). The parkway was constructed both as a scenic highway and to improve access to South Cumberland and the airport, which were often cut off from the rest of Cumberland by flooding or traffic jams at the sole connecting point, a railroad underpass on Virginia Avenue. New bridges over the North Branch Potomac River and the C&O Canal were built in 1992 and 1997, while the portion of Canal Parkway from the canal crossing toward downtown Cumberland was constructed between 1999 and 2001.

== Route description ==
Canal Parkway begins at the West Virginia state line on a bridge across the North Branch Potomac River between Wiley Ford and the southern edge of the city of Cumberland. The roadway continues south as WV 28 through Wiley Ford toward Greater Cumberland Regional Airport. Canal Parkway heads north as a two-lane highway, crossing the C&O Canal and its towpath on a Warren truss bridge. The state highway gains a median and intersects River Avenue, part of the old connection from Cumberland to Wiley Ford that serves the South Cumberland neighborhood. No trucks are allowed on the road north of River Avenue. Canal Parkway continues north between the C&O Canal to the west and an industrial area to the east, both of which are shielded from view by trees and walls. Beyond Elder Street, the state highway reduces to a two-lane road without a median.

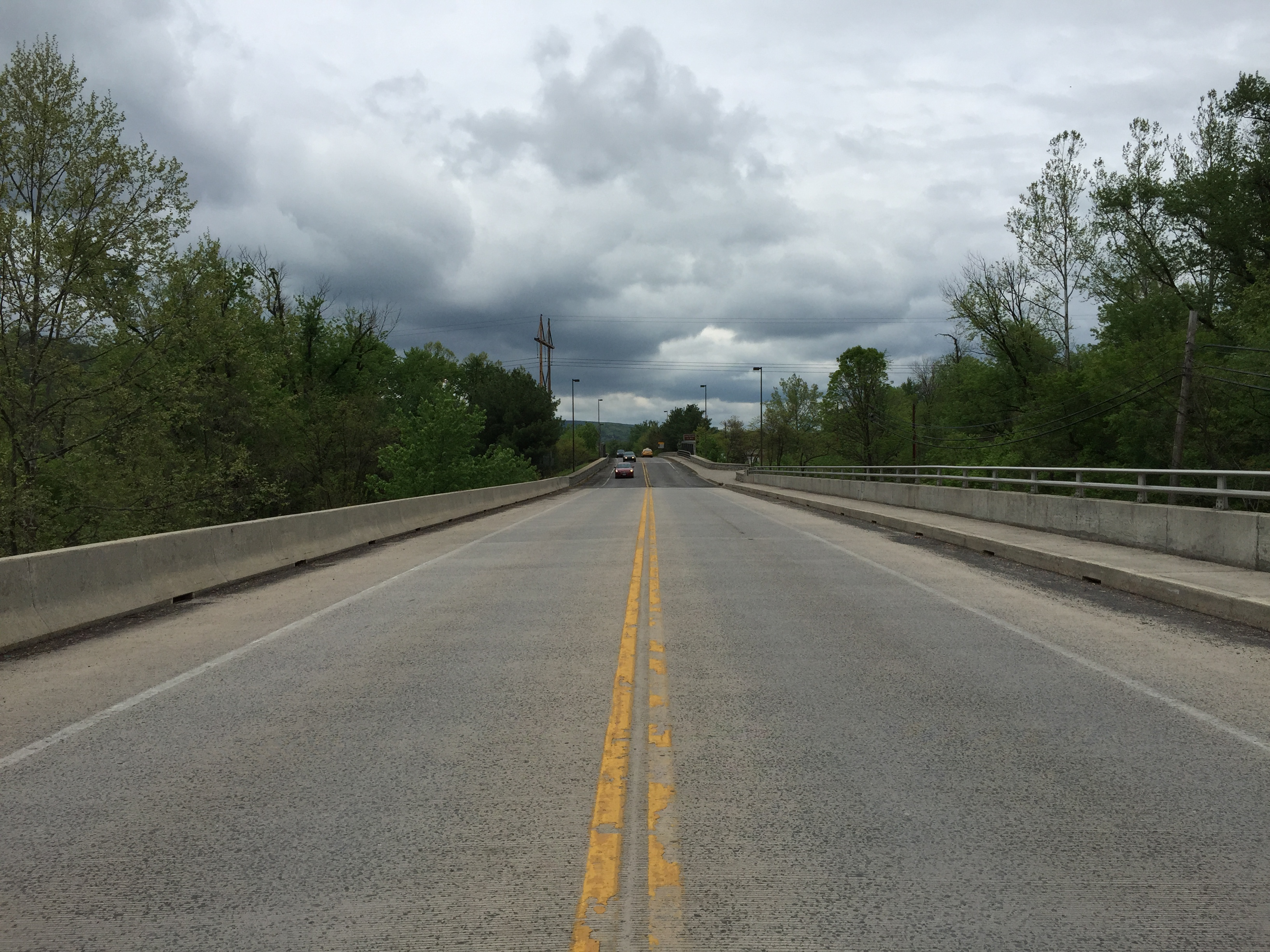
View north from the south end of Canal Parkway at WV 28 at the West Virginia border on the bridge over the North Branch Potomac River in Cumberland

As the parkway is approached by CSX's Cumberland Terminal Subdivision railroad line west of the Cumberland rail yard, the parkway ceases to be shielded by trees. Canal Parkway rises onto a retaining wall above the level of the C&O Canal to the west and on level with the railroad that begins to closely parallel the state highway to the east. The state highway's elevation allows views of the North Branch Potomac River and Knobly Mountain to the west but discourage views of the adjacent C&O Canal and MD 51 (Industrial Parkway), which parallels the east side of the railroad. Canal Parkway descends from the retaining wall to cross a rail spur from the Cumberland Terminal Subdivision that heads north to Canal Place. The two directions of the state highway split for a partial interchange with MD 51, with the northbound lane passing under MD 51's overpass of the railroad. The northbound lane of Canal Parkway has a right-in/right-out interchange with Wineow Street before merging with westbound MD 51 a short distance south of downtown Cumberland.

== History ==
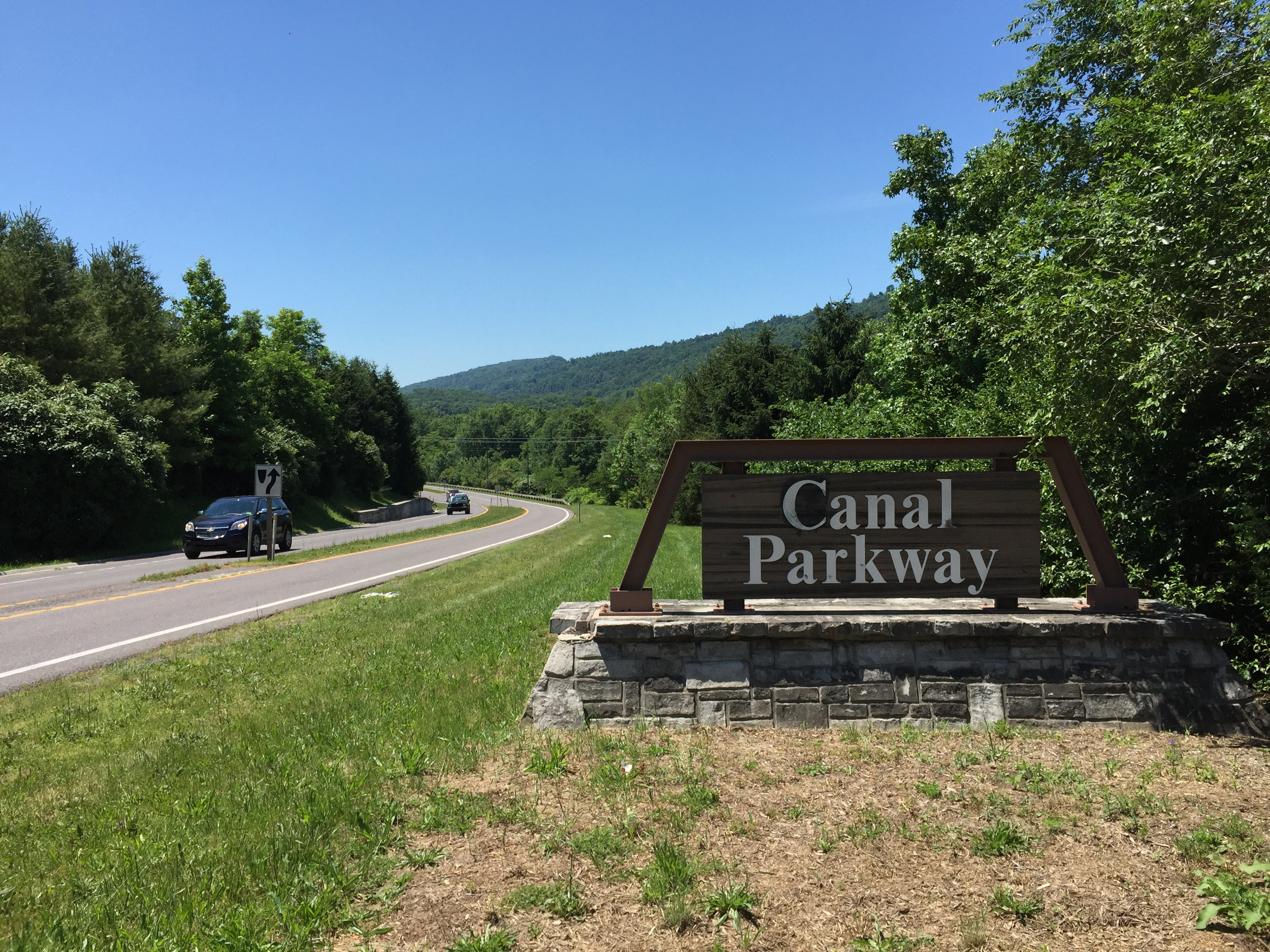
View south along Canal Parkway near Elder Street in Cumberland

Wiley Ford is named for a shallow spot in the North Branch Potomac River just east of the present bridge over the river. The first bridge at Wiley Ford was constructed around 1908; a replacement bridge was built in the late 1950s. Traffic heading to Wiley Ford from downtown Cumberland travelled Virginia Avenue south from Oldtown Road, the old alignment of MD 51, then followed River Avenue southwest to its present intersection with Canal Parkway, then south across the river along Ford Avenue, which followed the same alignment as Canal Parkway today. In addition to the route suffering from the standard problems of travelling through city streets, Virginia Avenue passed under the Baltimore and Ohio Railroad tracks via a low, narrow underpass that was vulnerable to flooding and, due to its location immediately south of Virginia Avenue's intersections with MD 51, was the frequent site of traffic jams. A problem at the underpass isolated South Cumberland south of the tracks from the rest of the city and required a lengthy detour through West Virginia. The same problems also hindered access to Greater Cumberland Regional Airport from the city.

Canal Parkway was constructed as part of a broad group of projects to revitalize the North Branch Potomac River waterfront south of downtown Cumberland starting in 1989. These projects included:

- The rehabilitation of the C&O Canal, including its re-watering, through the Cumberland portion of the Chesapeake and Ohio Canal National Historical Park by the U.S. Army Corps of Engineers.
- Restoration of historic Western Maryland Railway properties, which included restoration of the former Western Maryland Railway Station and establishment of the Western Maryland Scenic Railroad, a heritage railroad.
- The construction of new bridges across the North Branch Potomac River and C&O Canal and an automobile parkway along a portion of the canal by the Maryland State Highway Administration to serve as a scenic highway and to improve access to Greater Cumberland Regional Airport.
- The construction of Canal Place by the National Park Service to tie together these and other historical properties, including Fort Cumberland and the Downtown Cumberland Historic District.

The first section of Canal Parkway to be built was the reconstruction of Ford Avenue from the West Virginia state line to River Avenue. A new bridge over the North Branch Potomac River was completed in 1992. A new bridge over the C&O Canal was completed in 1997, eliminating an at-grade crossing of the highway and the C&O Canal towpath. Construction of Canal Parkway from River Avenue to MD 51 was underway by 1999 and completed in 2001, at which time the highway received the unsigned MD 61 designation.

== Junction list ==
The entire route is in Cumberland, Allegany County.

mi	km	Destinations	Notes
0.00	0.00	WV 28 south – Wiley Ford, Greater Cumberland Regional Airport	West Virginia state line at North Branch Potomac River; southern terminus
1.94	3.12	MD 51 west (Industrial Boulevard) – Downtown Cumberland	Northern terminus; eastbound exit from and westbound entrance to MD 51
1.000 mi = 1.609 km; 1.000 km = 0.621 mi: Incomplete access

== Auxiliary routes ==
MD 61 originally had two auxiliary routes. Both routes were transferred to municipal maintenance in 2005.

- MD 61A was the designation for an unnamed 0.14-mile (0.23 km) connector west from the intersection of MD 61 and River Avenue to serve properties between the highway and the C&O Canal.
- MD 61B was the designation for a 0.08-mile (0.13 km) section of River Avenue immediately east of its intersection with MD 61.
