= John C. Lee (Alabama politician) =

American politician (1856–1938)

Member of the Alabama House of Representatives from the Perry County district
- In office 1911, 1913, 1915, 1919–1920, 1923 Serving with Alvin Milton Spessard, Joseph Hopkins James Jr., William Burford Alexander, Emmett Kilpatrick

Personal details
- Born: John Cook Lee; January 22, 1856 Perry County, Alabama, U.S.
- Died: December 20, 1938 (aged 82) near Marion, Alabama, U.S.
- Resting place: Marion Cemetery
- Party: Democratic
- Spouse(s): Ludie Scears (m. 1880; died 1888) Lynda Tarrant (m. 1894; died 1932)
- Children: 6
- Education: Howard College
- Occupation: Politician; farmer

John Cook Lee (January 22, 1856 – December 20, 1938) was an American politician from Alabama. He served in the Alabama House of Representatives.

== Early life ==
John Cook Lee was born on January 22, 1856, in Perry County, Alabama, to Harriet (née Cook) and John Lee. He attended common schools in Perry County and was in the junior class of Howard College in 1875.

== Career ==
Lee was a Democrat. He served as a member of the Alabama House of Representatives, representing Perry County. He represented the county in 1911, 1913, 1915, 1919, 1920, and 1923. He also worked as a farmer.

== Personal life ==
Lee married twice. He married Sudie Scears, daughter of John Scears, of Eutaw on December 9, 1880. They had four sons, John C. Jr., Pettus, Scears, and Perry. His wife died in 1888. He married Lynda Tarrant, daughter of Florence (née Fowlkes) and J. C. Tarrant, on October 24, 1894. They had two sons, Edward Tarrant and Bradley Fowlkes. His second wife died in 1932.

Lee lived west of Marion. His house burned in August 1903. He was a member of the Baptist Church and a member of the Knights of Pythias.

Lee died of pneumonia on December 20, 1938, at his home near Marion. He was buried in Marion Cemetery.
