= Bell-Varner House =

Historic house in Maryland

- U.S. National Register of Historic Places
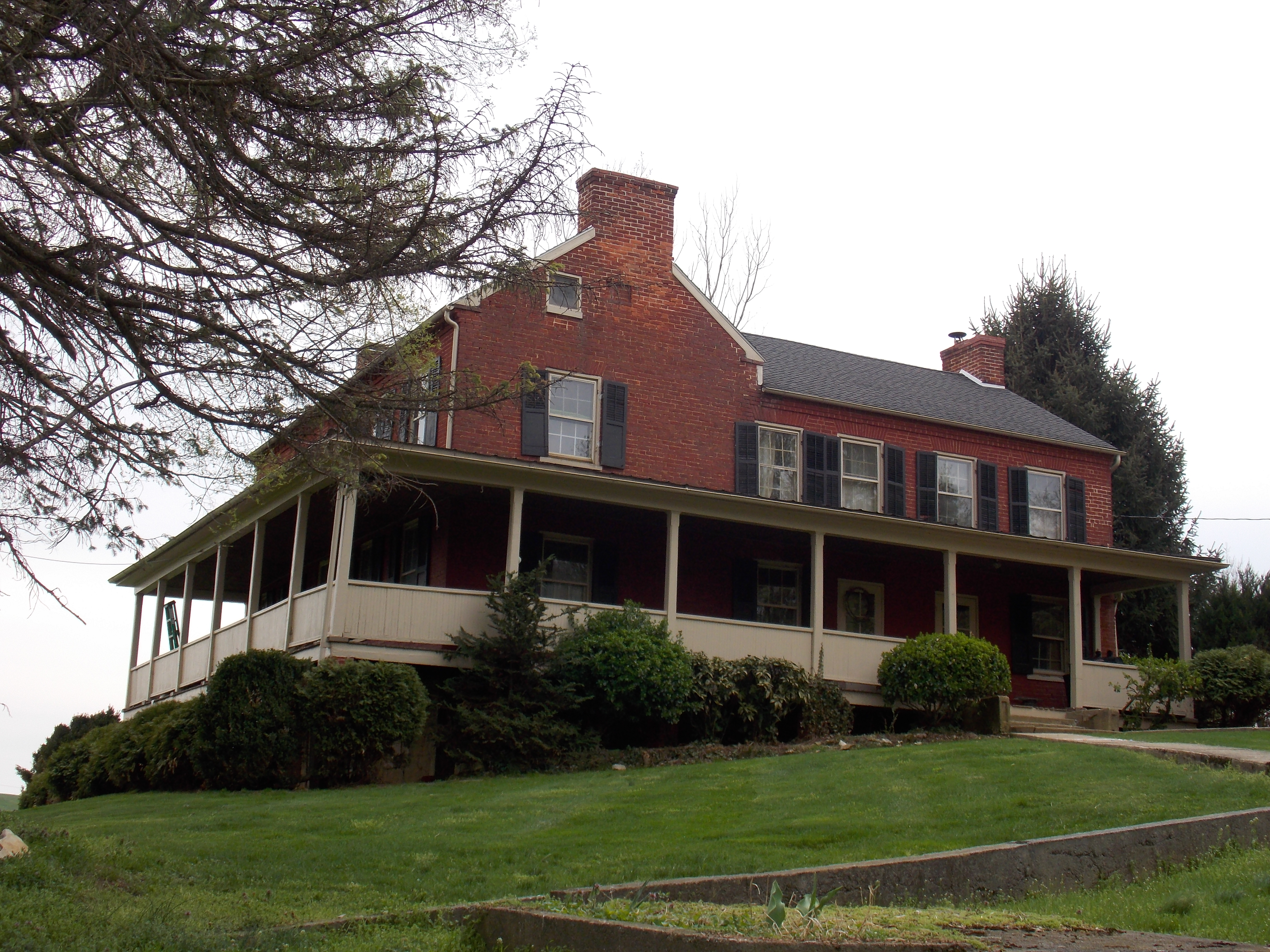

- Location within Maryland Location within the United States
- Location: Southeast of Leitersburg on Unger Rd., Leitersburg, Maryland
- Coordinates: 39°40′4″N 77°36′26″W
- Area: 3.6 acres (1.5 ha)
- Built: 1851
- Built by: Bell, Jonas
- NRHP reference No.: 79003271
- Added to NRHP: September 24, 1979

Bell-Varner House is a historic home located at Leitersburg, Washington County, Maryland, United States. It is a 2 1/2-story, five-bay brick dwelling with a two-story, four-bay rear wing, built in 1851 It features a partially enclosed double porch and slate roof.

It was listed on the National Register of Historic Places in 1979.
