= Tipahato =

Historic house in Maryland, United States

- U.S. National Register of Historic Places
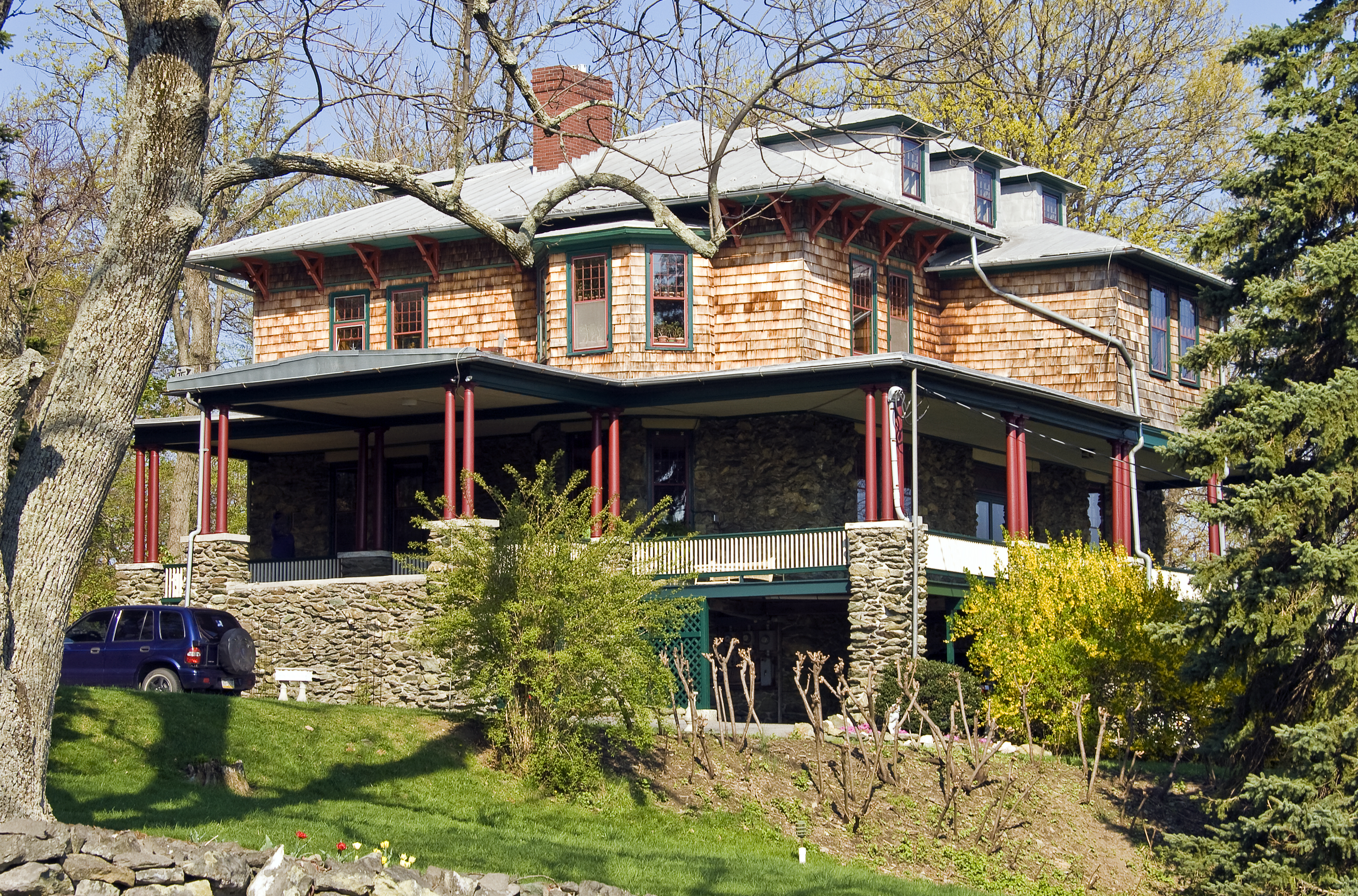

- Location within Maryland Location within the United States
- Location: 17130 Raven Rock Rd., Cascade, Maryland
- Coordinates: 39°42′10.55″N 77°29′10.64″W
- Area: 9.1 acres (3.7 ha)
- Built: 1906
- Architectural style: Bungalow/craftsman, Italianate, American Foursquare
- NRHP reference No.: 01000744
- Added to NRHP: July 19, 2001

Tipahato is a former summer residence in Cascade, Frederick County, Maryland that combines Italianate and bungalow design features, as well as Queen Anne and Colonial Revival design. This very large house was built in 1906.

Tipahato was listed on the National Register of Historic Places in 2001.
