= Cavetown, Maryland =

- CDP
- Location of Cavetown, Maryland
- Coordinates: 39°38′34″N 77°35′36″W
- Country: United States
- State: Maryland
- County: Washington

Area
  - Total: 1.90 sq mi (4.93 km^{2})
  - Land: 1.90 sq mi (4.93 km^{2})
  - Water: 0 sq mi (0.00 km^{2})
- Elevation: 679 ft (207 m)

Population (2020)
  - Total: 1,446
  - Density: 759.4/sq mi (293.22/km^{2})
- Time zone: UTC−5 (Eastern (EST))
  - Summer (DST): UTC−4 (EDT)
- ZIP code: 21720
- Area codes: 301, 240
- FIPS code: 24-14225
- GNIS feature ID: 2389289

Cavetown is a census-designated place (CDP) in Washington County, Maryland, United States. The population was 1,486 at the 2000 census.

== History ==
The Willows was listed on the National Register of Historic Places in 1973.

== Geography ==
According to the United States Census Bureau, the CDP has a total area of 1.9 square miles (4.9 km^{2}), all land.

== Demographics ==
Historical population
| Census | Pop. | Note | %± |
|---|---|---|---|
| 2020 | 1,446 | | — |
U.S. Decennial Census

At the 2000 census there were 1,486 people, 577 households, and 461 families living in the CDP. The population density was 770.9 inhabitants per square mile (297.6/km^{2}). There were 589 housing units at an average density of 305.6 per square mile (118.0/km^{2}). The racial makeup of the CDP was 97.51% White, 0.13% African American, 0.27% Native American, 0.13% Asian, 0.81% from other races, and 1.14% from two or more races. Hispanic or Latino of any race were 1.55%.

Of the 577 households 28.9% had children under the age of 18 living with them, 71.4% were married couples living together, 5.2% had a female householder with no husband present, and 20.1% were non-families. 17.2% of households were one person and 9.0% were one person aged 65 or older. The average household size was 2.58 and the average family size was 2.88.

The age distribution was 22.5% under the age of 18, 5.2% from 18 to 24, 27.1% from 25 to 44, 28.3% from 45 to 64, and 16.9% 65 or older. The median age was 42 years. For every 100 females, there were 103.8 males. For every 100 females age 18 and over, there were 96.3 males.

The median household income was $48,816 and the median family income was $60,238. Males had a median income of $38,523 versus $28,173 for females. The per capita income for the CDP was $19,790. About 2.8% of families and 3.8% of the population were below the poverty line, including 0.8% of those under age 18 and 5.3% of those age 65 or over.

== Notable people ==
- John P. Fockler (died 1911), member of the Maryland House of Delegates
- Alvin Milton Spessard (1860–1924), Alabama state politician and educator
