= Alvin Milton Spessard =

American politician and educator (1860–1924)

Member of the Alabama House of Representatives from the Perry County district
- In office 1915–1916 Serving with John C. Lee

Personal details
- Born: November 14, 1860 Cavetown, Maryland, U.S.
- Died: February 20, 1924 (aged 63) Uniontown, Alabama, U.S.
- Party: Democratic
- Spouse: Annie Sims White (m. 1897)
- Education: St. John's College (MA)
- Occupation: Politician; educator; businessman

Alvin Milton Spessard (November 14, 1860 – February 20, 1924) was an American politician and educator from Alabama.

== Early life ==
Alvin Milton Spessard was born on November 14, 1860, in Cavetown, Maryland, to Susan R. (née Hawkins) and Samuel H. Spessard. He graduated with a Master of Arts from St. John's College.

== Career ==
Spessard began teaching in September 1880. He served as head of the Oxford Academy in Oxford, Maryland, for two years. In 1890, he became head of a grade school in Blacksburg, South Carolina. In 1894, he moved to Alabama. He then worked in Uniontown as head of the Uniontown Public Schools. He was superintendent of the Perry County Board of Education from 1898 to 1903. He served on the board from 1904 to at least 1915. He served on the state's textbook commission. He was president of Canebrake Cotton Mills.

Spessard was a Democrat. He served in the Alabama House of Representatives, representing Perry County in 1915. At the time of his death, he was planning a hotel in Uniontown.

Spessard was president of the Uniontown Commercial Club at the time of his death. He was director of the J. H. White Mercantile Company, Planters and Merchants Bank, and Uniontown Cotton Oil Company.

== Personal life ==
Spessard married Annie Sims White, daughter of Ella (née Sims) and John Henry White, of Uniontown in 1897. They had no children. He was an elder of the First Presbyterian Church and superintendent of a Sunday school. He was a member of the Knights of Pythias and Woodmen of the World.

Spessard died on February 20, 1924, at his home in Uniontown.
