= Zion Reformed United Church of Christ =

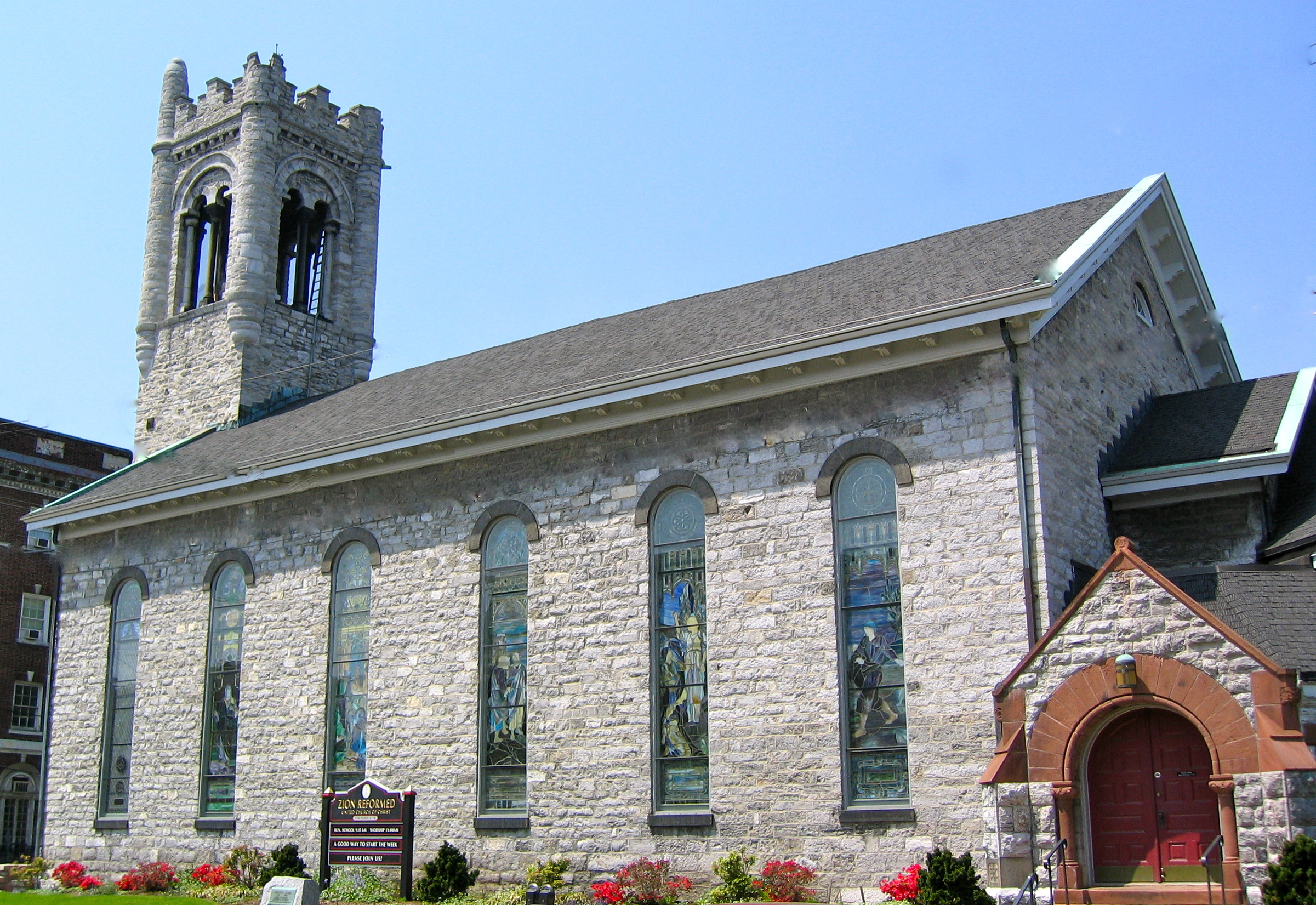
- 2004

- Location within Maryland
- 39°38′43″N 77°43′6″W
- Location: 201 N. Potomac Street; Hagerstown, Maryland
- Country: USA
- Denomination: United Church of Christ
- Website: www.zionreformed.church

History
- Founded: 1770
- Consecrated: 1774

Zion Reformed United Church of Christ, originally The German Reformed Church was founded in 1770 in Hagerstown, Maryland. The church, at 201 North Potomac Street, was the first within the town limits. It is the oldest church building in Washington County, Maryland that has been in continuous use as a church since its construction. During the American Civil War, the church’s bell tower was used as a lookout by Union troops under the command of General George Custer.

== History ==
The 18th century western frontier of the Maryland colony had previously been ravaged by marauding Shawnee and Delaware Indians after General Edward Braddock’s defeat at Fort Duquesne. In spite of the danger, German settlers erected a log schoolhouse around 1766 on the grounds of the present church, an area then known as Potato Hill. This building was used by the German community both as a school and as a place for religious services. Local Indians would listen to the lessons through the windows. The Tuscarora Indians were the last native people known to inhabit the area in large numbers. The log school building was used for services until the stone church was built, then it continued to serve as a day school and as a lecture hall.

German-speaking immigrants comprised the majority of Hagerstown’s earliest inhabitants and they brought with them from their homeland their religious customs. Fleeing to Holland for safety, these persecuted Protestants were befriended and supported, both in Holland and later in America, by the tolerant and kindly Dutch people. A group of forty German refugees from the religious persecutions in Switzerland and the German Palatinate, organized a German Reformed, or Calvinist, congregation in Elizabeth’s Town, later known as Hagerstown. The Reformed settlements of the Conococheague area were served at intervals by ministers sent from Philadelphia. The earliest church record for the congregation is of the baptism of George Snyder, son of Jacob and Catharine Snyder, on October 20, 1766. From this date forward there is a continuous baptismal record. In September, 1770, the Rev. Jacob Weimer was appointed as the first pastor.

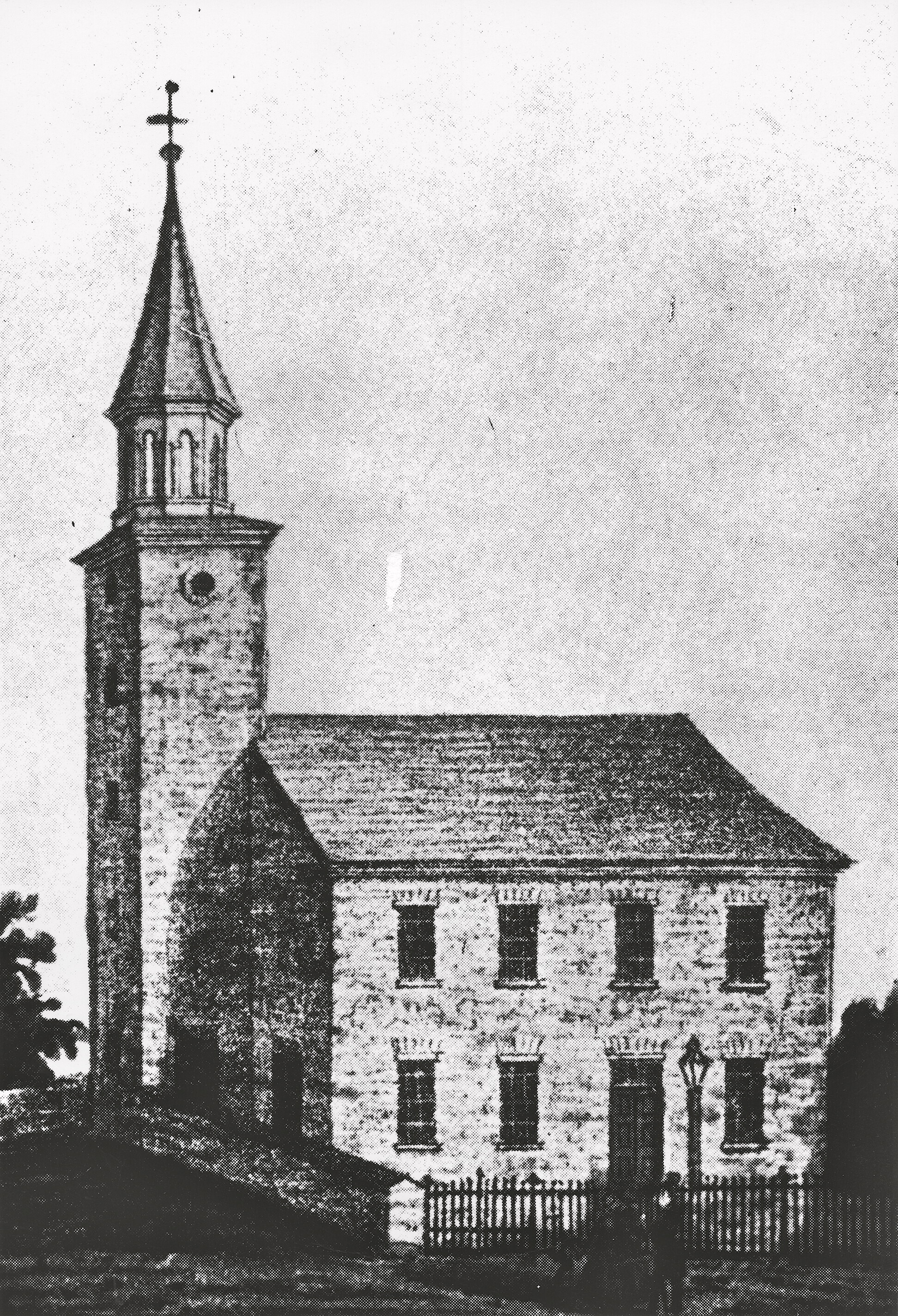
Zion Church as it appeared shortly after construction.

Jonathan Hager, a member of the congregation and Proprietary of Elizabeth’s Town, now called Hagerstown, had laid out the town in 1762 and named it Elizabeth’s Town, in honor of his wife, Elizabeth. In 1770, Hager gave the church two lots in the northern part of town on Potomac Street, the principal street.

Four years passed before work was begun on the building. The congregation elected as builder, mason and architect William Heyser/Wilhelm Heiser, a member and deacon of the congregation, who, with the cooperation of his colleagues, the other deacons of the congregation, namely, Philip Oster, Peter Wagner, and Jacob Hauser, brought the work so far as to lay the cornerstone on Wednesday, August 10, 1774. Built by Germans upon solid rock, this stone church, though enlarged and altered, has endured for more than two centuries. The interior of the building stood unfinished for some years while the building-master, Capt. Heyser, organized a company of German volunteers and led them to support General George Washington. Wounded at the Battle of Brandywine, Capt. Heyser returned home to recuperate and, in time, to complete the church building.

Zion Reformed Church's limestone walls have witnessed uninterrupted congregational worship since 1774. From the foundation, which was built upon a rock, to the bell tower pointing skyward, the church was erected by its founders as a symbol of religious freedom in their new homeland. The church was the first large building in the town and its commanding presence on a hilltop overlooking the town of 50,000 today is the same building which stood watch over the town in its infancy as a small hamlet of a few hundred houses. While the property has been improved and enlarged, within and without, the sanctuary maintains the original 1774 proportions and the original 2-foot-thick (0.61 m) limestone masonry walls.

Unable to locate the original deed from Captain Hager, the church leadership sought legal title to the land on which this church stands. In 1784, the land was purchased from the estate of the founder of Hagerstown, Captain Jonathan Hager, for a nominal fee but subject to an annual ground rent of one shilling and sixpence sterling paid faithfully by the congregation each March 1 for seventy-five years.

== Cemetery ==
Burial space adjoining the church was provided for early members of the congregation. Members of many families, whose ancestors are buried here, made substantial contributions to an endowment fund, the income from which is to be used for the care and upkeep of the graveyard. Other members made yearly contributions to be used for the same purpose. The oldest burial is that of Peter Rench, who died in 1771. By 1900 no more lots were available; the last burial in a family lot was in 1991. In 1997, the congregation established a memorial garden for cremated remains of members. Currently 708 are buried in Lots 1 through 390, Sections 1 through 4; additionally, 8 are interred in the memorial garden. The churchyard has become the final resting place for veterans of the French and Indian War (1754–1763), the American Revolution (1774–1781), the War of 1812, the Mexican–American War (1848), the Civil War (1861–1865) and World War I. Two plaques in the church’s narthex give the names of the "sons of Zion" who served in World War I and World War II.

The church graveyard is home to the ashes of Jonathan Hager, founder of Hagerstown, who gave the lot upon which it stands. He was killed on December 6, 1775, when a heavy beam being lifted to the ceiling of the church, slipped and fell, crushing Capt. Hager.

== Bells ==
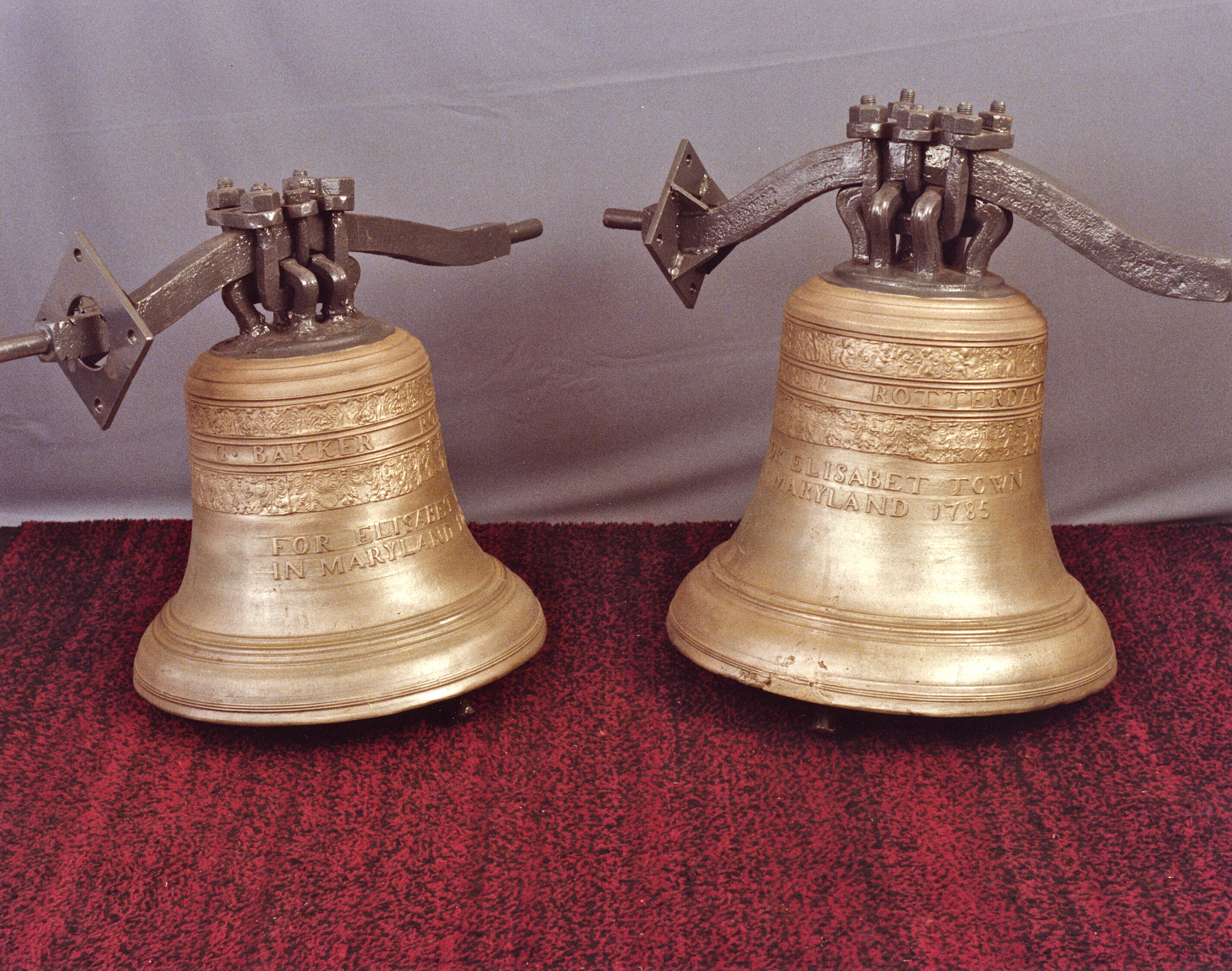
Zion's church bells.

Another custom the founders of Zion Church remembered from their German traditions was the summoning to worship by the church bells. An order for church bells bears the date November 22, 1790:

Dimension and description of two church bells which Messrs. Alexander and Benjamin Clagett agree to import from London for the German Reformed Congregation of this Town. The largest bell to measure thirty-six inches in diameter and the smallest in proportion thereto both as to size and tone, according to the most usual and approved difference in those respects, in the judgment of the bell ringers and bell hangers. The bells to be of the very best quality and proved by Judges of Bells before they are shipped from London, and a certificate from the said judges as to all the above requisites sent to us, attested by a Notary Public under the seal of his office, that the persons as far as he can understand are competent judges of as well the goodness as the suitable sizes and difference of tone of bells. The bells to be cast so as to be hung in a church steeple, and the clappers fixed in them nothing else is necessary to be sent with the said bells.
Vor die Deutsche Reformierte Gemeinde in Elizabeth Stadt, Washington County, Stadt von Maryland.

The bells, so ordered, were shipped across the Atlantic and hauled over the mountain to their destination in the tower of the church. The two bells hanging today in the tower were cast in 1785 in Rotterdam, Holland, in the foundry of G. Bakker. From information provided in 1920 by the same company, the composition of the metal in these bells has been determined to be eleven per cent coin silver for tonal clarity with proportionate amounts of antimony, bismuth, copper, tin, and zinc. These bells have a tone peculiarly their own.

== Split with Christ's Reformed Church ==
For Zion Church’s first 80 years, the services were in German. The change from the German to English left a portion of the congregation dissatisfied as there were some who did not understand English. The choice was not only a language issue, it was also a social class issue, since the upper class businessmen and community leaders were exposed to English while conducting business, and the farmers, laborers and servants were confined to German which was used at home. The uneducated assimilated more slowly than the anglicized elements of the community. In March, 1855, there was a meeting of those who preferred the German language. They organized, bought a lot, and laid the cornerstone of Christ's Reformed Church, completed and dedicated in 1856. Within twenty years, the services at Christ’s Reformed Church were conducted in English.

== Civil War ==
In July, 1863, the citizens of Hagerstown could see the smoke rising from the cannons in Gettysburg. They witnessed General Robert E. Lee’s Confederate Army approaching Hagerstown from the northeast. General George Custer and his men used the church as a lookout to watch the Southern Army entrenched to the north and stretching along the road to Williamsport. The Union Army, after a hasty retreat from Smithsburg, at the insistence of General J.E.B. Stuart, had deployed their forces south of Hagerstown, in the vicinity of Funkstown. Here the two armies watched each other, with the unhappy town lying between the two battle weary forces. Units of each army raced through the town, skirmishing took place in the streets, men were killed not far from Zion Church, and the citizens feared that if a large scale engagement developed between the two opposing forces, the town, in the direct line of fire, would be destroyed. General Lee’s escape to comparative safety south of the Potomac River averted this disaster.

Mr. Thomas F. McCardell wrote and published an account of his involvement with Gen. Custer. He told how, at the time of Gen. Lee’s withdrawal from Gettysburg, it fell to his lot, as a boy, to conduct Gen. Custer, the 24-year-old cavalry leader of the Union Army, into the tower of Zion Church, for the purpose of locating the troops of Gen. Lee, and how, while in the belfry, the bullets of sharpshooters aimed at Gen. Custer rattled against the bells of Zion Church.

In 1864, Brig. Gen. John McCausland gave the citizens of Hagerstown three hours to provide $20,000 and 1,500 outfits of clothing “from the skin out” for the use of the Confederate forces, on penalty of having Hagerstown destroyed by fire. The fate which befell neighboring Chambersburg, Pennsylvania was prevented through the skillful negotiations of Mr. Matthew Barber, Town Treasurer, and Mr. J. Dixon Roman, President of the Old Hagerstown Bank and a leading member of Zion Church, who left his sick bed and went to the Court House for the meeting with McCausland. The town was saved and Zion Church with it.

== Bell tower ==
The original bell tower was not a tower but a regular church steeple. In 1871 the second bell steeple was built but in 1878 was destroyed by a tornado and rebuilt. In 1884 the present tower was erected and dedicated and in 1885 the original bells were returned to their place in the tower.

== Stained glass windows ==
Most striking to those who visit Zion Church are the stained glass windows. The oldest windows are the Roman Window and the Schnebly Window which were installed between 1880 and 1907. When the church was remodeled in 1908, nine more stained glass windows were installed and since that time more have been added for a total of ten in the sanctuary, two in the narthex, two angel windows in the vestibule, two in the foyer, and four more in the chapel. Wikimedia Commons has photographs of all of the church's stained glass windows.

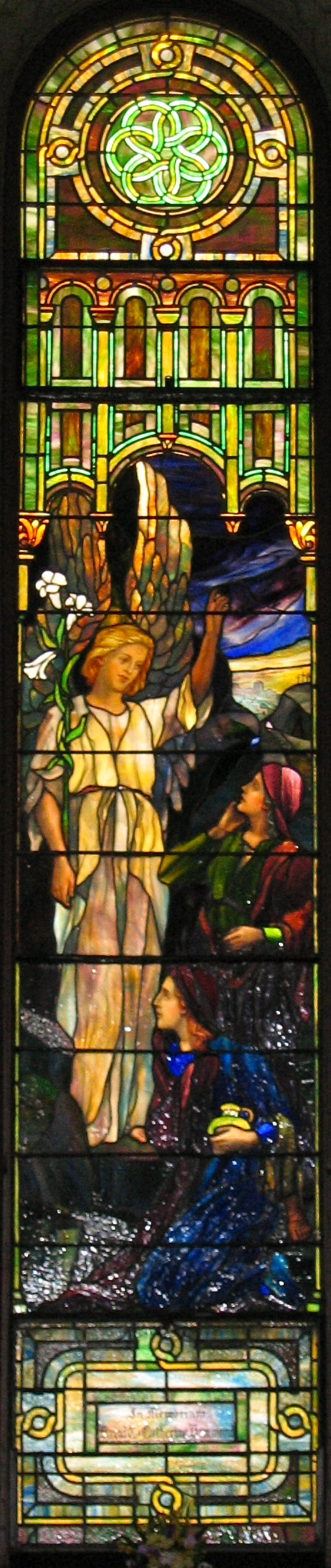
The Resurrection

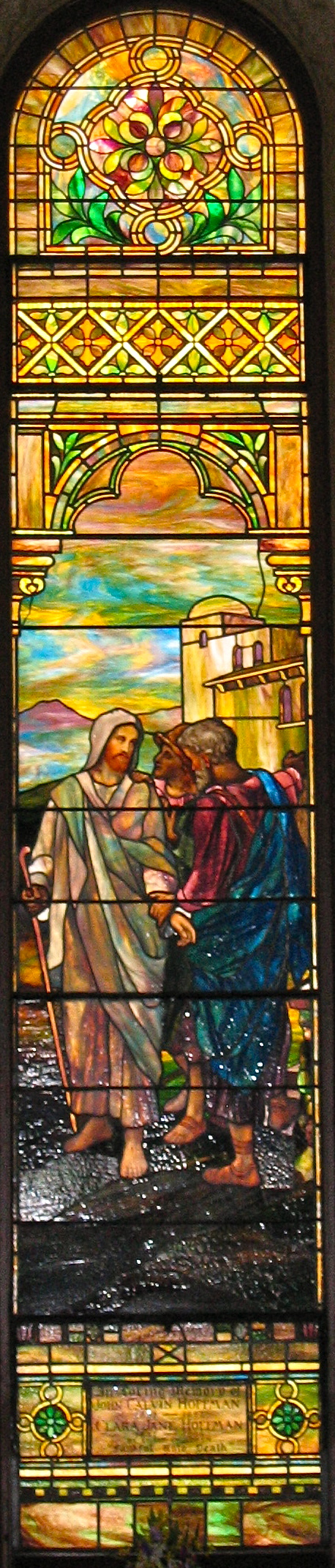
On the Way to Emmaeus

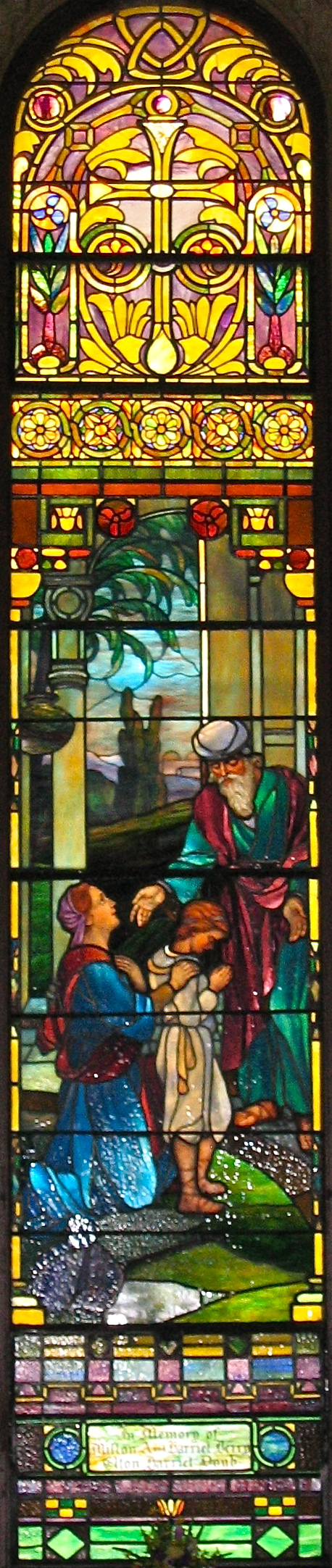
Hannah and Little Samuel

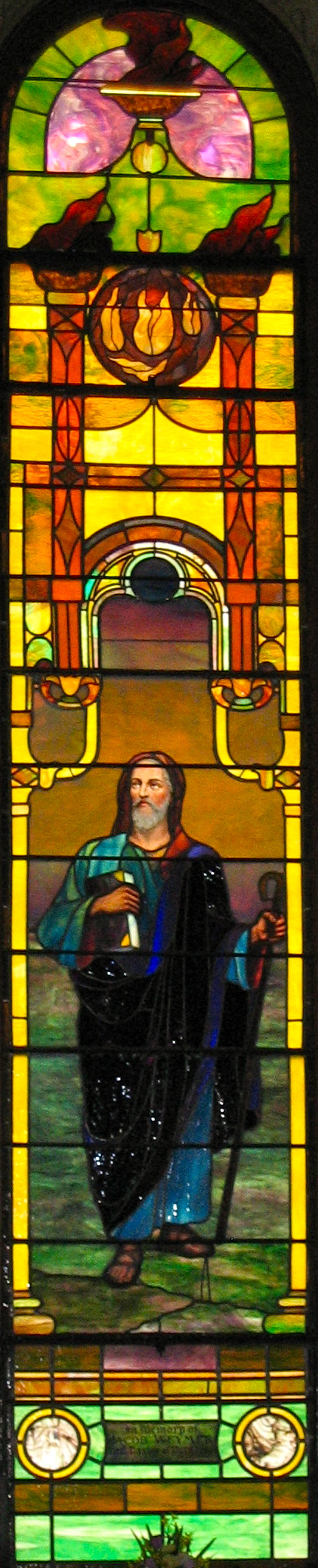
St. Paul

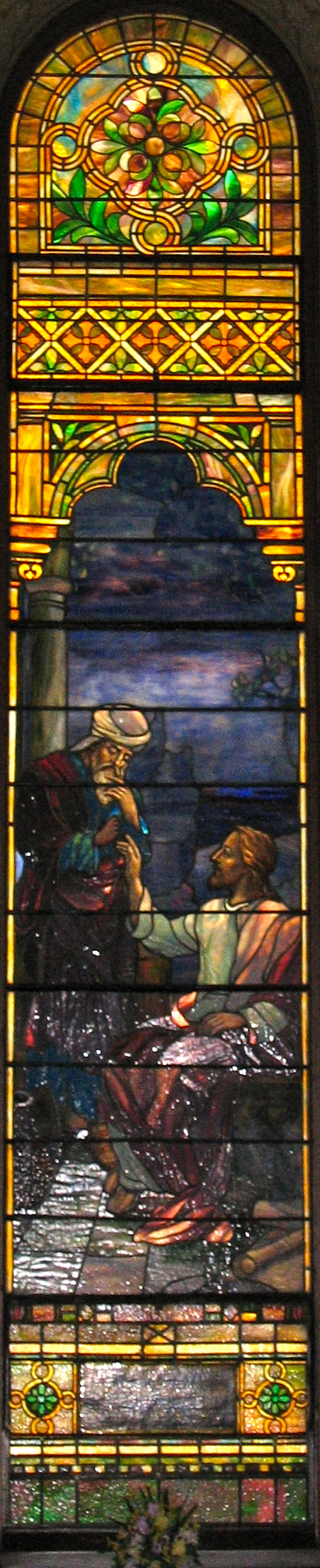
Nicodemus and Christ

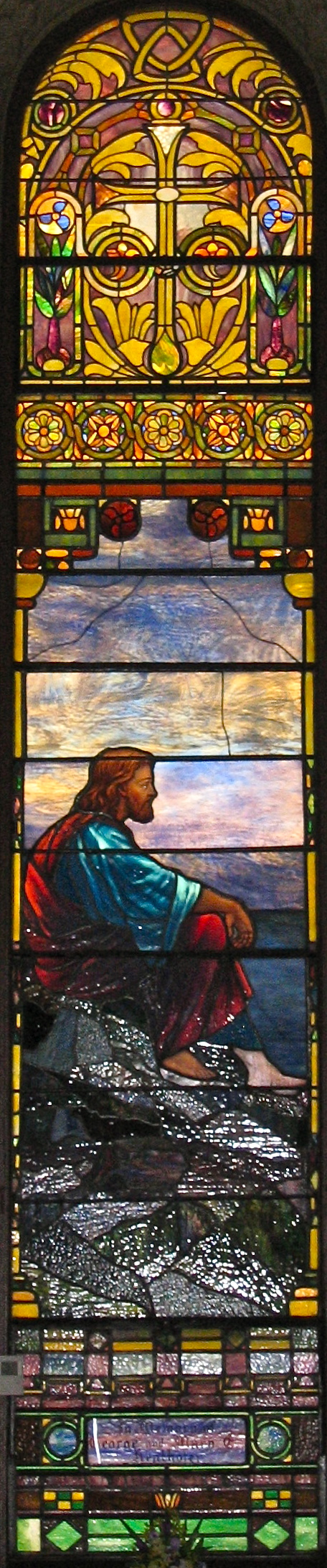
Christ by the Sea

== Mosaic ==
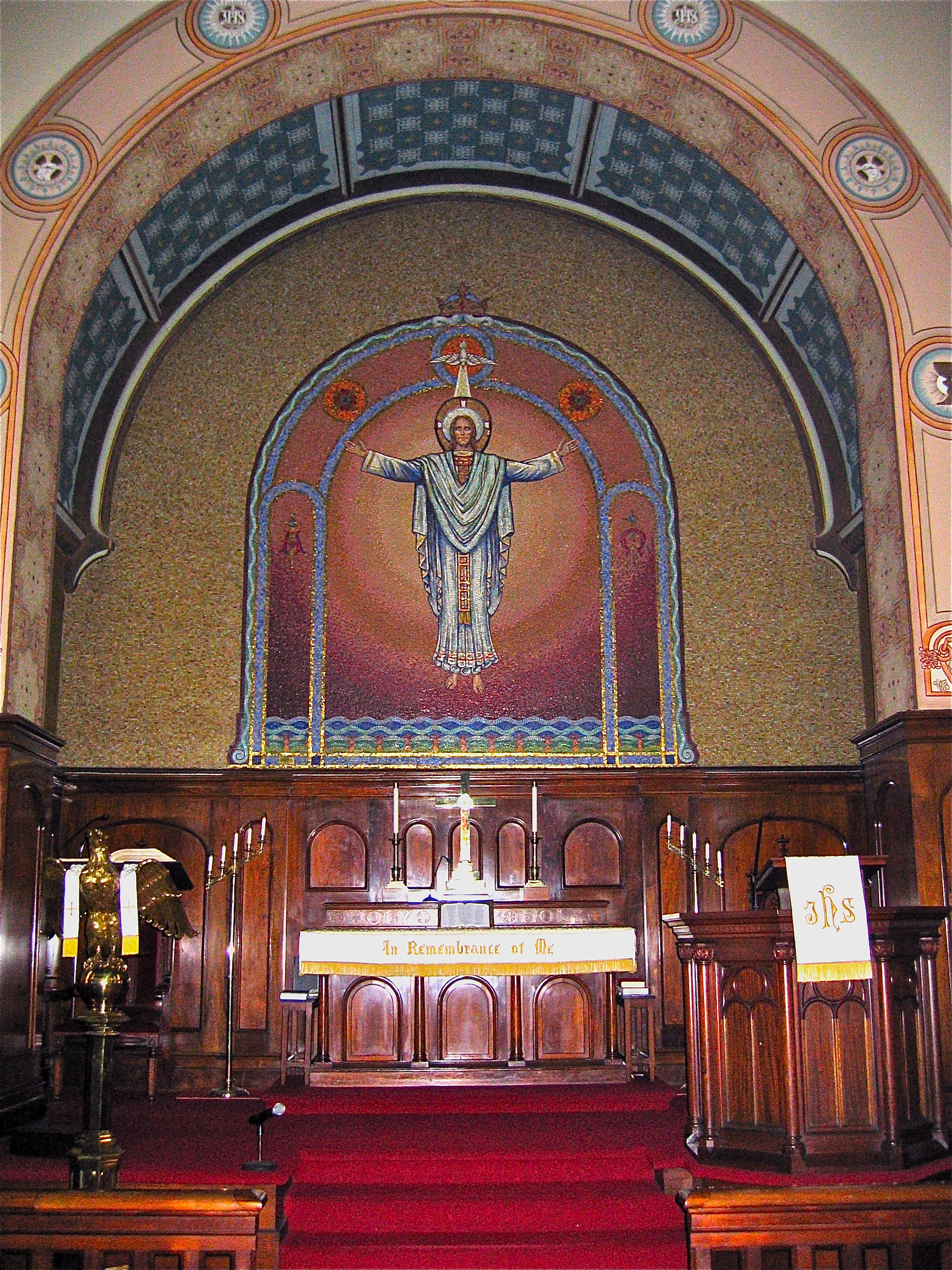
"Ascending Christ" mosaic over the altar of Zion Church.

The Ascending Christ mosaic over the main altar was installed in 1946.

== Möller pipe organ ==
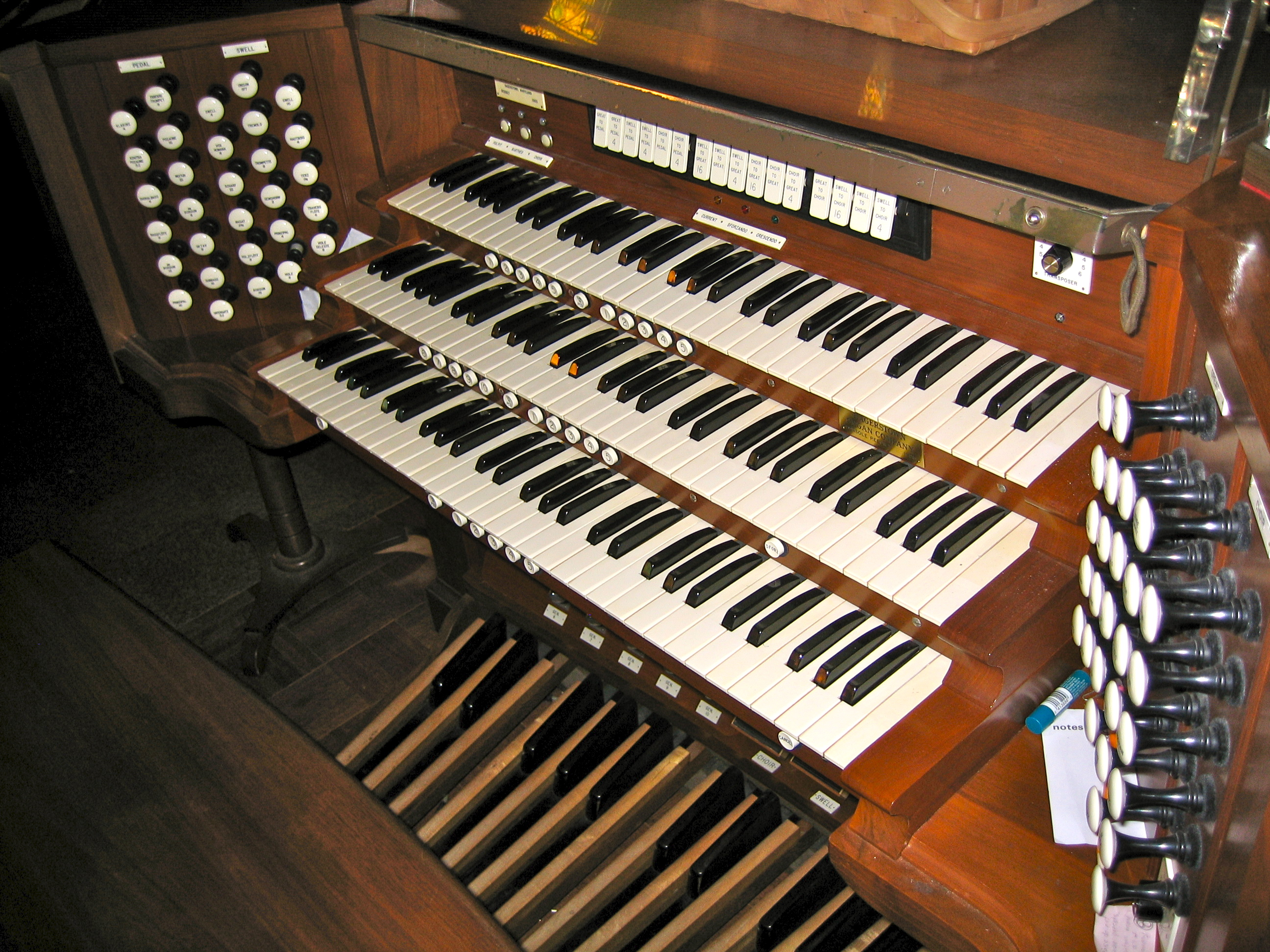
Zion Church's Möller pipe organ console.

Zion’s first organ, a Bohler, was installed in 1889 at a cost of $2,325. Then in 1928, the Möller organ still serving the congregation today was installed for $10,500. The organ was built at the M.P. Moller Pipe Organ Company in Hagerstown. In 1963 the organ was rebuilt and 1,544 new pipes were added. Previous renovations included preparations in the console for further tonal enhancements. Improvements to the Möller organ are ongoing in an effort to keep the organ state-of-the-art. Zion's organ now has a total of 2,217 pipes, ranging in size from smaller than a pencil to 16 feet (4.9 m) long.

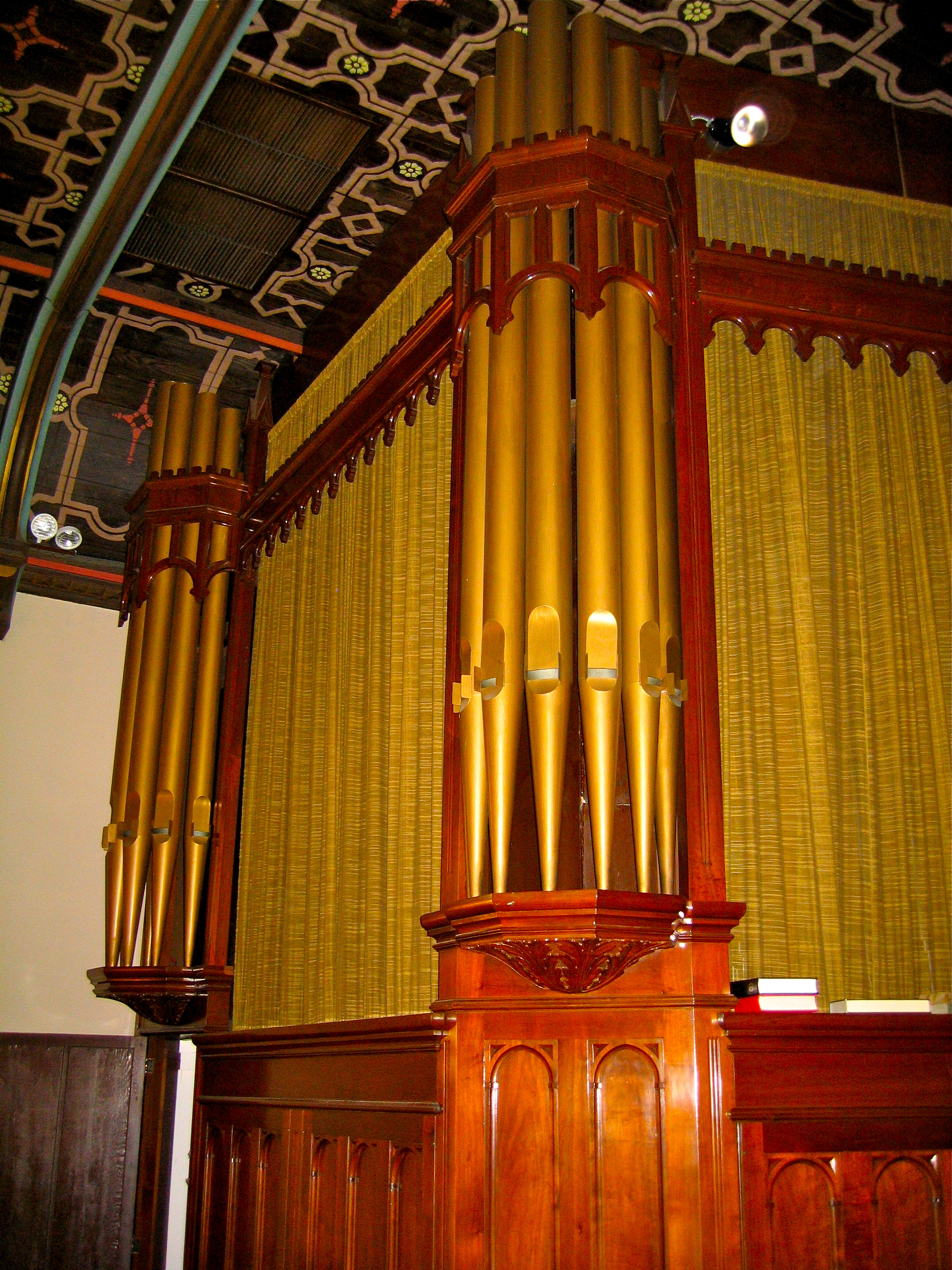
The majority of the more than 2,200 pipes are housed behind the curtains on either side of the choir loft.

== Pastors ==
- 1770–1790 Jacob Weymer
- 1792–1817 Jonathan Rauhauser
- 1818–1825 James Ross Reily
- 1826–1832 Martin Bruner
- 1833–1836 William A. Good
- 1837–1842 Alfred Helffenstein
- 1843–1849 Moses Kiefer
- 1850–1855 Daniel Gans
- 1855–1860 Samuel H. Giesy
- 1861–1864 John H. Wagner
- 1868–1919 J. Spangler Kieffer
- 1920–1952 Scott R. Wagner
- 1952–1958 Robert W. Delp
- 1958–1961 Roy C. Snyder
- 1961–1981 Arthur L. Grove
- 1982–1988 Wayne D. Sautter
- 1989–1990 Richard H. Winters
- 1990–1993 Nathan A. Miller
- 1994–1998 Jack Dale Cook
- 2001–2002 Marianne Unger
- 2003–2008 Robert C. Royal
- 2011–present Kevin S. Munroe

== Worship ==
Zion Reformed United Church of Christ holds worship services every Sunday morning and extends an open door to all people who share a common goal to unite Christians together. Communion is served on the first Sunday of each month. All are welcome at the communion table in the United Church of Christ.

Zion Reformed United Church of Christ is associated with the United Church of Christ, Central Atlantic Conference, Catoctin Association. The United Church of Christ, established in 1957, is fundamentally rooted to its predecessors, the Evangelical and Reformed Church and the Congregational Christian Churches.

Zion Reformed United Church of Christ shares its history with the Swiss, German and English Reformations. The Reformation of the 16th century only partially restored the active role of the congregation. Zion Reformed United Church of Christ strives toward the level of individual participation evident in the early church. Zion Reformed United Church of Christ recognizes its responsibility as a church of Pentecost, the church of the Holy Spirit, living between the time of Christ’s birth and Christ’s coming again at the close of history. Prayers and liturgies found in the United Church of Christ Book of Worship include reminders that the church today forms the One, holy, catholic and apostolic Church with Christ at its center.

== Bibliography ==
- Weiser, Frederick Sheely, “Zion Evangelical and Reformed Church, a Congregation of the United Church of Christ, Hagerstown, Washington County, Maryland 1771-1849” (Astronomical Society of the Pacific Conference Series) published by the Historical Society of Carroll County, 1997.
