= Leitersburg Historic District =

Historic district in Maryland, United States

- U.S. National Register of Historic Places
- U.S. Historic district
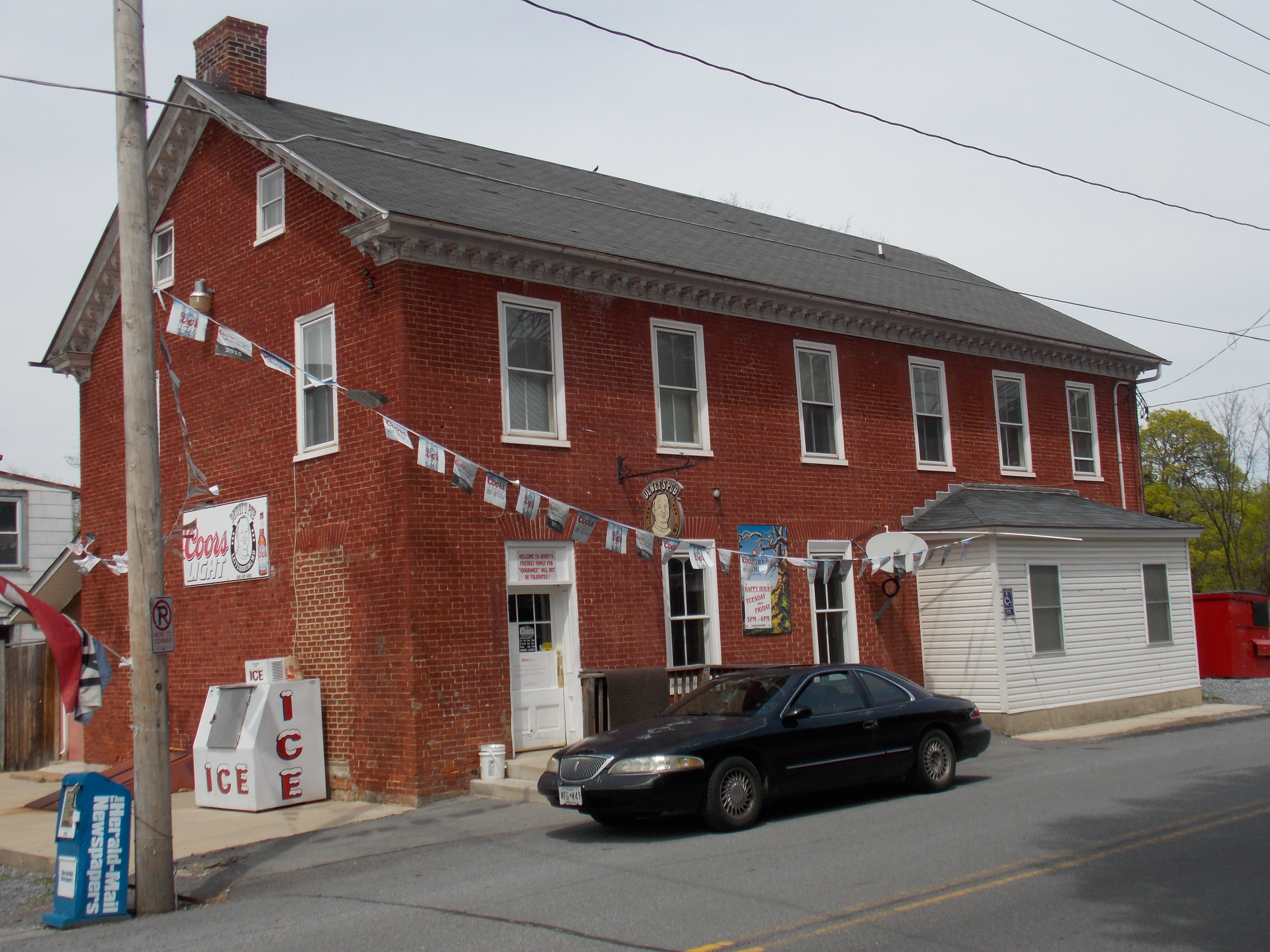

- Location within Maryland Location within the United States
- Location: Leitersburg-Smithsburg Rd., Leiter St., Leiter's Mill Rd., Ringgold St., Leitersburg, Maryland
- Coordinates: 39°41′42″N 77°37′15″W
- Area: 100 acres (40 ha)
- Built: 1815
- Architectural style: Georgian, Federal, et al.
- NRHP reference No.: 03001295
- Added to NRHP: December 19, 2003

Leitersburg Historic District is a national historic district at Leitersburg, Washington County, Maryland, United States. The district is centered on this early-19th century village. The village square retains three original early 19th century brick buildings, a tavern, general store, and dwelling; as well as a late-19th century wooden frame grocery store / meeting hall. Most of the original 30 log buildings, somewhat altered, remain. The village contains a cohesive collection of architectural resources reflecting a wide variety of vernacular types and popular expressions dating from the early 19th century through the early 20th century.

It was added to the National Register of Historic Places in 2003.
