= Chewsville, Maryland =

- CDP
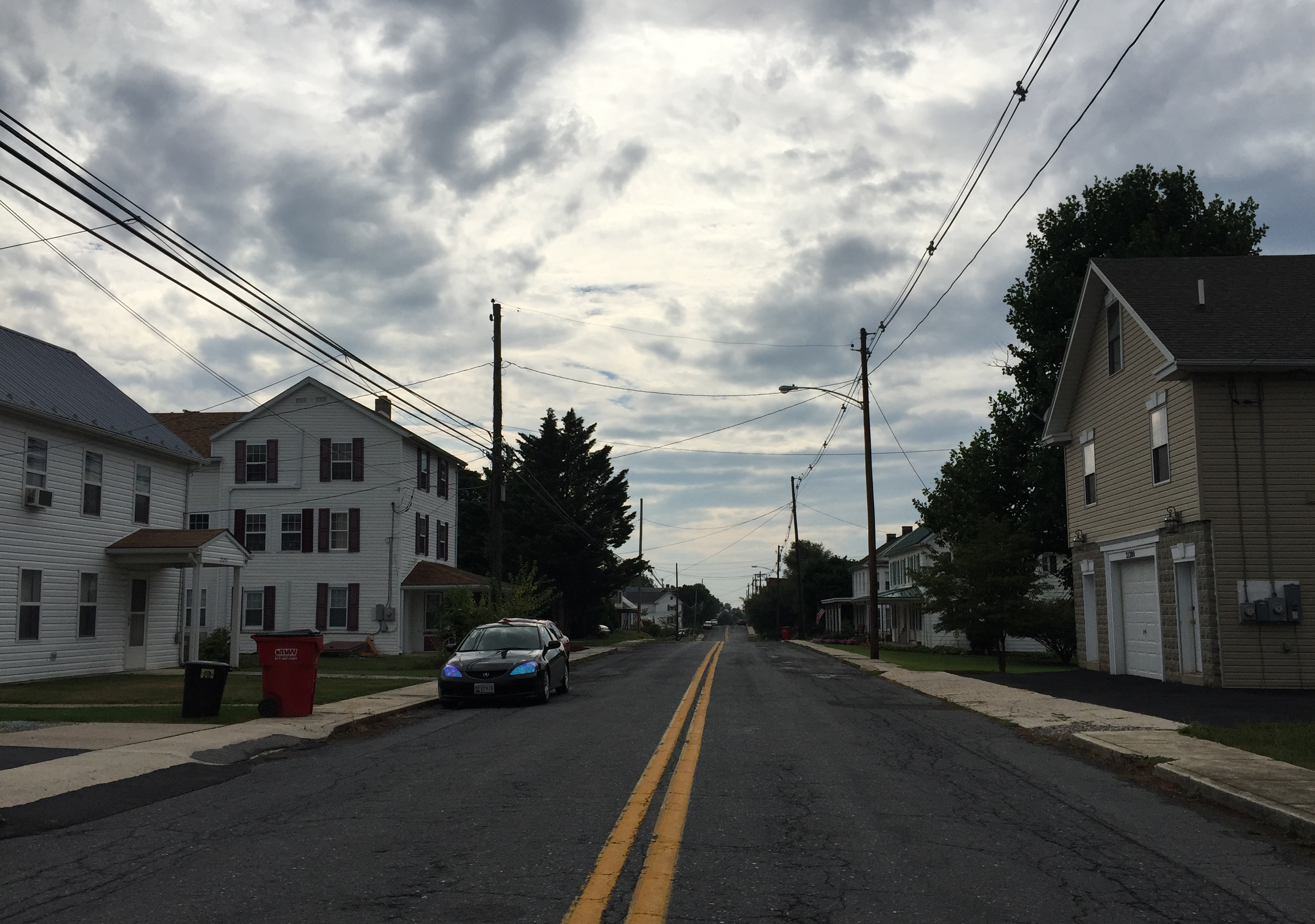

- Location of Chewsville, Maryland
- Coordinates: 39°38′54″N 77°37′40″W
- Country: United States
- State: Maryland
- County: Washington

Area
  - Total: 0.83 sq mi (2.16 km^{2})
  - Land: 0.83 sq mi (2.16 km^{2})
  - Water: 0 sq mi (0.00 km^{2})
- Elevation: 686 ft (209 m)

Population (2020)
  - Total: 261
  - Density: 312.5/sq mi (120.67/km^{2})
- Time zone: UTC−5 (Eastern (EST))
  - Summer (DST): UTC−4 (EDT)
- ZIP code: 21721
- Area codes: 301, 240
- FIPS code: 24-16800
- GNIS feature ID: 2389318

Chewsville is a census-designated place (CDP) in Washington County, Maryland, United States. The population was 261 at the 2020 census.

== Geography ==
According to the United States Census Bureau, the CDP has a total area of 0.8 square miles (2.1 km^{2}), all land.

== Demographics ==
Historical population
Census	Pop.	Note	%±
2020	261		—
U.S. Decennial Census

=== 2010 ===
Population by Race in Chewsville Maryland (2010)
Race	Population	% of Total
Total	238	100
White	224	94

=== 2000 ===
At the 2000 census there were 293 people, 117 households, and 74 families living in the CDP. The population density was 351.9 inhabitants per square mile (135.9/km^{2}). There were 125 housing units at an average density of 150.1 per square mile (58.0/km^{2}). The racial makeup of the CDP was 98.98% White, 0.34% Asian, and 0.68% from two or more races. Of the 117 households 29.9% had children under the age of 18 living with them, 51.3% were married couples living together, 7.7% had a female householder with no husband present, and 35.9% were non-families. 29.1% of households were one person and 9.4% were one person aged 65 or older. The average household size was 2.50 and the average family size was 3.15.

The age distribution was 29.0% under the age of 18, 6.5% from 18 to 24, 30.0% from 25 to 44, 22.5% from 45 to 64, and 11.9% 65 or older. The median age was 37 years. For every 100 females, there were 98.0 males. For every 100 females age 18 and over, there were 94.4 males.

The median household income was $28,482 and the median family income was $31,302. Males had a median income of $26,250 versus $24,844 for females. The per capita income for the CDP was $12,617. About 22.7% of families and 22.7% of the population were below the poverty line, including 44.2% of those under the age of eighteen and 51.3% of those sixty five or over.
