= Highfield-Cascade, Maryland =

- CDP
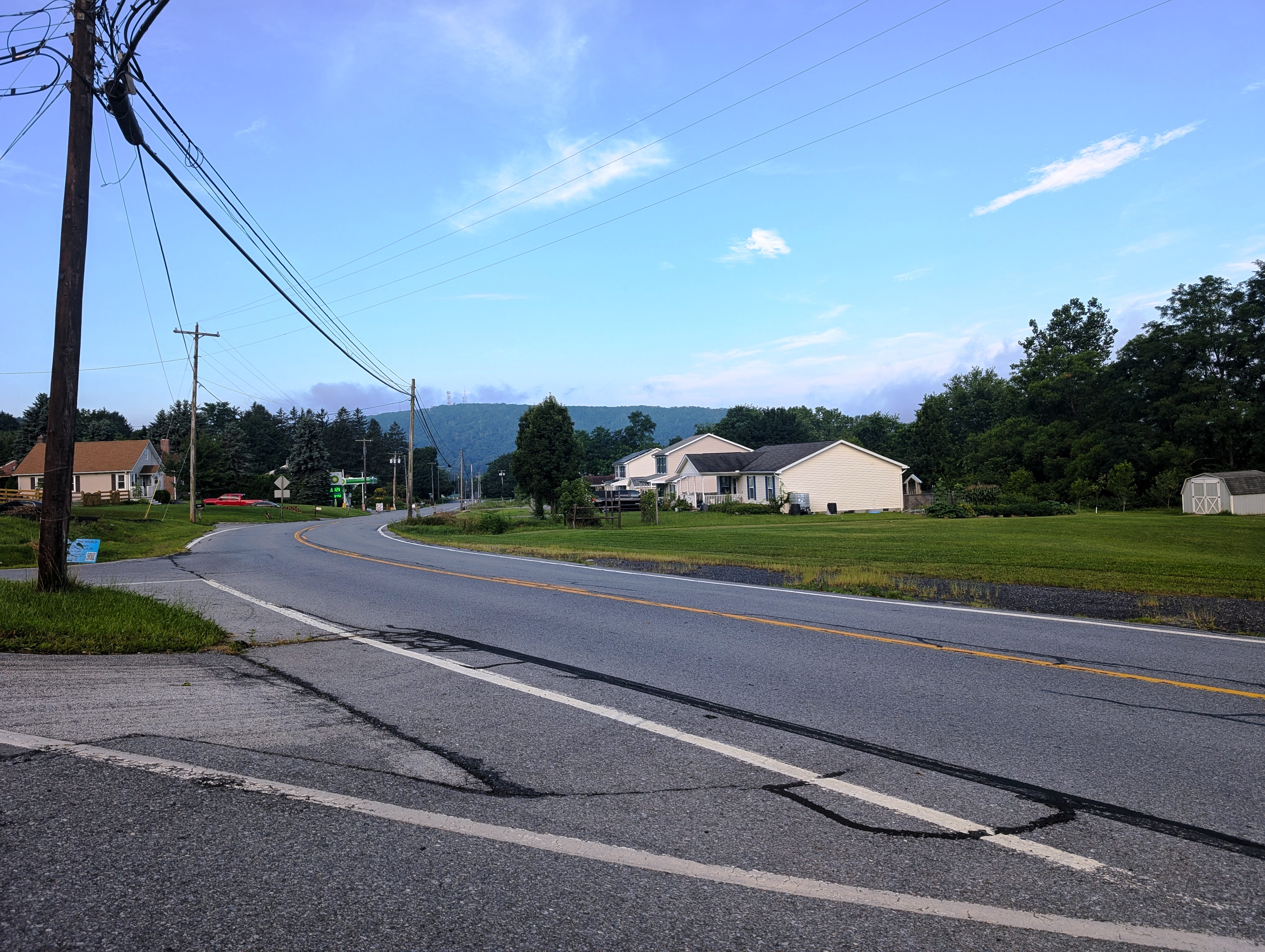
- MD 550 in Cascade

- Location of Highfield-Cascade, Maryland
- Coordinates: 39°42′46″N 77°30′15″W
- Country: United States
- State: Maryland
- County: Washington

Area
  - Total: 1.73 sq mi (4.49 km^{2})
  - Land: 1.73 sq mi (4.49 km^{2})
  - Water: 0 sq mi (0.00 km^{2})
- Elevation: 1,303 ft (397 m)

Population (2020)
  - Total: 1,082
  - Density: 624.6/sq mi (241.15/km^{2})
- Time zone: UTC−5 (Eastern (EST))
  - Summer (DST): UTC−4 (EDT)
- ZIP code: 21719
- Area codes: 240 and 301
- FIPS code: 24-38437
- GNIS feature ID: 1852592

Highfield-Cascade is a census-designated place (CDP) in Washington County, Maryland, United States. The CDP is, however, more commonly referred to as just Cascade, MD. The official CDP name encompasses two closely-spaced unincorporated communities, Highfield and Cascade. The population of the CDP was 1,082 at the 2020 census.

== Geography ==
According to the United States Census Bureau, the CDP has a total area of 1.7 square miles (4.4 km^{2}), all land.

== Demographics ==
Historical population
| Census | Pop. | Note | %± |
|---|---|---|---|
| 2020 | 1,082 | | — |
U.S. Decennial Census

At the 2020 Census there were 1,082 people and 447 households living in the CDP. The population density was 669.9 inhabitants per square mile (258.6/km^{2}). There were 447 housing units at an average density of 281.2 per square mile (108.6/km^{2}). The racial makeup of the CDP was 91.1% White, 1.9% African American, 0.1% Native American, 0.6% Asian, and 3.7% from two or more races. Hispanic or Latino of any race were 2.4%.

Of the 447 households 34.3% had children under the age of 18 living with them, 47.2% were married couples living together, 21.9% had a female householder with no husband present, and 28.2% were non-families. 13.9% of households were one person and 8.1% were one person aged 65 or older. The average household size was 2.59 and the average family size was 3.07.

The age distribution was 26.9% under the age of 18, 6.4% from 18 to 24, 33.7% from 25 to 44, 21.3% from 45 to 64, and 11.7% 65 or older. The median age was 36 years. For every 100 females, there were 99.8 males. For every 100 females age 18 and over, there were 99.0 males.

The median household income was $35,833 and the median family income was $53,036. Males had a median income of $32,813 versus $26,106 for females. The per capita income for the CDP was $18,969. About 5.2% of families and 5.1% of the population were below the poverty line, including 4.1% of those under age 18 and 14.6% of those age 65 or over.
