= Ringgold, Maryland =

Unincorporated community in Maryland, United States

- Unincorporated community
- Location within Maryland Location within the United States
- Coordinates: 39°42′33″N 77°34′08″W
- Country: United States
- State: Maryland
- County: Washington

Area
  - Total: 0.29 sq mi (0.75 km^{2})
  - Land: 0.29 sq mi (0.75 km^{2})
  - Water: 0 sq mi (0.00 km^{2})
- Elevation: 764 ft (233 m)

Population (2020)
  - Total: 166
  - Density: 575.5/sq mi (222.19/km^{2})
- Time zone: UTC−5 (Eastern (EST))
  - Summer (DST): UTC−4 (EDT)
- Area codes: 240 & 301
- GNIS feature ID: 2583682

Ringgold is an unincorporated community and census-designated place in Washington County, Maryland, United States. Its population was 166 as of the 2010 census.

== Geography ==
According to the U.S. Census Bureau, the community has an area of 0.288 square miles (0.75 km^{2}), all land.

== Demographics ==
Historical population
Census	Pop.	Note	%±
2020	166		—
U.S. Decennial Census
