= Leitersburg, Maryland =

- Census-designated place
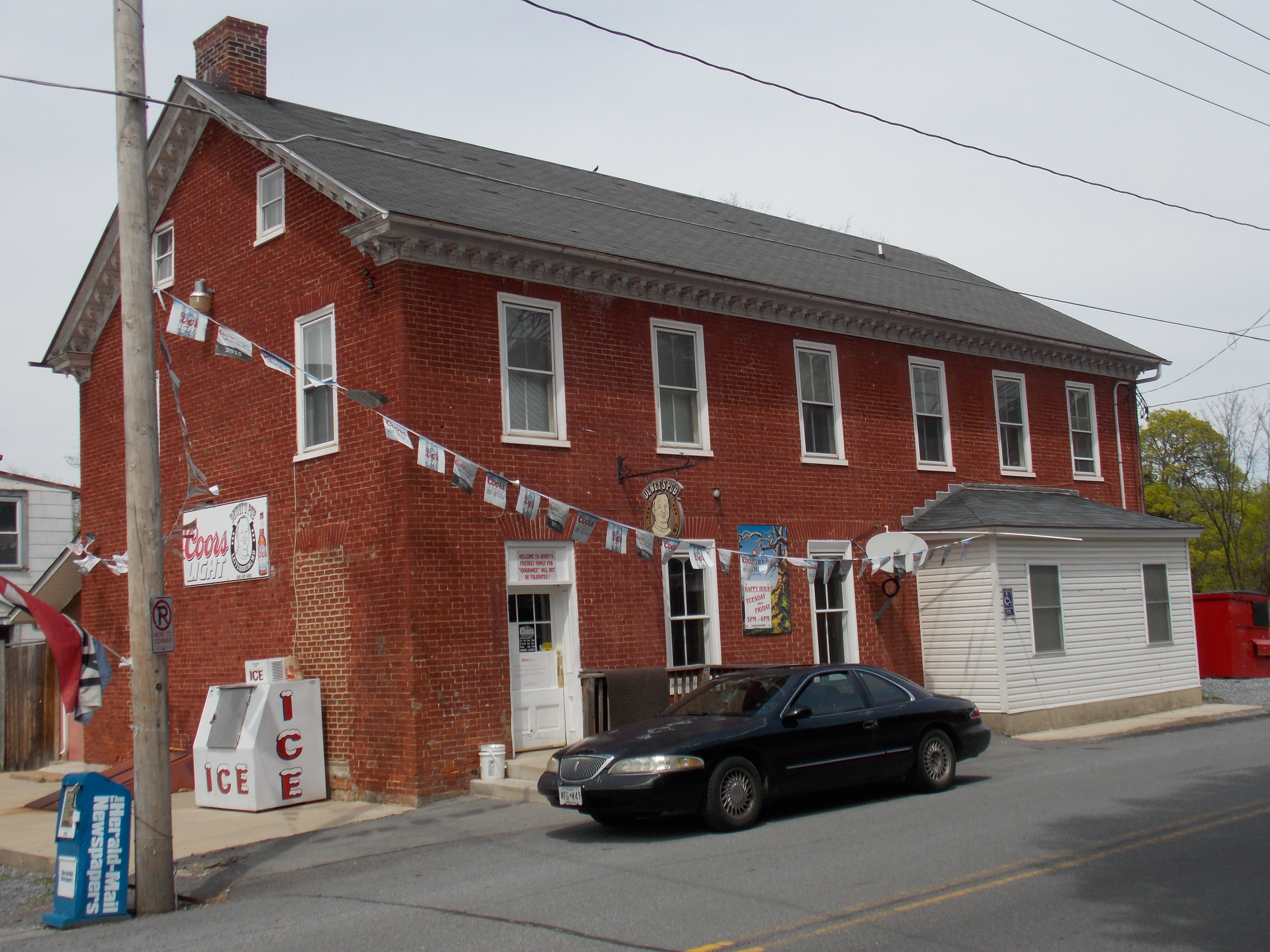

- Location of Leitersburg, Maryland
- Coordinates: 39°41′26″N 77°37′32″W
- Country: United States
- State: Maryland
- County: Washington

Area
  - Total: 1.75 sq mi (4.54 km^{2})
  - Land: 1.75 sq mi (4.54 km^{2})
  - Water: 0 sq mi (0.00 km^{2})
- Elevation: 594 ft (181 m)

Population (2020)
  - Total: 569
  - Density: 324.8/sq mi (125.42/km^{2})
- Time zone: UTC−5 (Eastern (EST))
  - Summer (DST): UTC−4 (EDT)
- ZIP code: 21742
- Area codes: 240 and 301
- FIPS code: 24-46400
- GNIS feature ID: 2390055

Leitersburg is a census-designated place (CDP) in Washington County, Maryland, United States. The population was 523 at the 2000 census.

== History ==
Bell-Varner House, Huckleberry Hall, and Leitersburg Historic District are listed on the National Register of Historic Places.

== Geography ==
According to the United States Census Bureau, the CDP has a total area of 1.8 square miles (4.7 km^{2}), all land.

== Demographics ==
Historical population
Census	Pop.	Note	%±
2020	569		—
U.S. Decennial Census

At the 2000 census there were 523 people, 218 households, and 163 families living in the CDP. The population density was 297.3 inhabitants per square mile (114.8/km^{2}). There were 226 housing units at an average density of 128.5 per square mile (49.6/km^{2}). The racial makeup of the CDP was 97.13% White, 0.96% African American, 0.19% Asian, 1.34% from other races, and 0.38% from two or more races. Hispanic or Latino of any race were 1.72%.

Of the 218 households 27.5% had children under the age of 18 living with them, 63.8% were married couples living together, 5.0% had a female householder with no husband present, and 24.8% were non-families. 21.1% of households were one person and 8.7% were one person aged 65 or older. The average household size was 2.38 and the average family size was 2.70.

The age distribution was 20.5% under the age of 18, 5.4% from 18 to 24, 28.7% from 25 to 44, 28.1% from 45 to 64, and 17.4% 65 or older. The median age was 42 years. For every 100 females, there were 100.4 males. For every 100 females age 18 and over, there were 99.0 males.

The median household income was $44,135 and the median family income was $43,929. Males had a median income of $30,735 versus $19,800 for females. The per capita income for the CDP was $22,662. None of the families and 5.8% of the population were living below the poverty line, including no under eighteens and 9.6% of those over 64.

== Notable people ==
- Benjamin F. Leiter, U.S. representative from Ohio
