= Stony Creek =

Stony Creek may refer to the following waterways or communities:

== Waterways ==
=== Australia ===
- Stony Creek, a tributary of the Allyn River, in the Hunter region of New South Wales
- Stony Creek, a tributary of the Brogo River, in the South Coast region of New South Wales
- Stony Creek, a tributary of the Towamba River, in the South Coast region of New South Wales
- Stony Creek, a tributary of the Stanley River, in the Moreton Bay Region of Queensland
- Stony Creek, a tributary of the Little River, in the Greater Geelong area of Victoria
- Stony Creek (Melbourne), a tributary of the Yarra River, in Melbourne, Victoria

=== Canada ===
- Stony Creek (Lake Erie), a watershed administered by the Long Point Region Conservation Authority, that drains into Lake Erie
- Stoney Creek (Lake Erie), a watershed administered by the Long Point Region Conservation Authority, that drains into Lake Erie

=== United States ===
- Stony Creek (Sacramento River tributary), California
- Stony Creek (Maryland), a tributary of the Patapsco River
- Stony Creek (Black River), flows into the Black River near Deer River, New York
- Stony Creek (Line Creek), converges with Line Creek by Middleburgh, New York
- Stony Creek (Mohawk River), a river that flows into the Mohawk River in Vischer Ferry, New York
- Stony Creek (West Canada Creek tributary), flows into West Canada Creek south of Middleville in Herkimer County, New York
- Stony Creek (Haw River tributary), a stream in Alamance and Caswell Counties, North Carolina
- Stony Creek (Mallard Creek tributary), a stream in Mecklenburg County, North Carolina
- Stony Creek, a tributary of the Schuylkill River, Pennsylvania
- Stony Creek (Black Creek tributary), Pennsylvania
- Stony Creek (Susquehanna River tributary), Pennsylvania
- Stonycreek River or Stoney Creek, a tributary of the Conemaugh River, Pennsylvania
- Stony Creek (Virginia), a river in Virginia
- Stony Creek (Clinch River), Virginia
- Little Stony Creek (North Fork Shenandoah River), Virginia, a tributary of the North Fork Shenandoah River
- Stony Creek (North Fork Shenandoah River), Virginia, a tributary of the North Fork Shenandoah River

== Communities ==
=== Australia ===
- Stony Creek, Queensland, a rural locality in the Moreton Bay Region
- Stony Creek, Victoria, a township in South Gippsland

=== New Zealand ===
- Stony Creek, New Zealand, a locality in Clutha District

=== United States ===
- Stony Creek (Branford), a shorefront section of Branford, Connecticut
- Stony Creek, Michigan, an unincorporated community
- Stony Creek, Monroe County, Michigan, an unincorporated community
- Stony Creek, New York, a town in Warren County
- Stony Creek, Virginia, a town in Sussex County

== See also ==
- Stonycreek (disambiguation)
- Stoney Creek (disambiguation)
- Stone Creek (disambiguation)
- Stony Clove Creek, in the Catskill Mountains in New York
- Stony Fork Creek, a 4.1-mile-long (6.6-kilometer) tributary of Babb Creek in Tioga County, Pennsylvania
- Stony Run Creek, in Yellow Medicine County, Minnesota
