= Stony Run =

Stony Run may refer to:

- Stony Run (Baltimore), a stream in Baltimore, Maryland
- Stony Run (Buffalo Creek), a stream in Union County, Pennsylvania
- Stony Run (Little Catawissa Creek), a stream in Columbia and Schuylkill Counties Pennsylvania
- Stony Run (Minnesota), a stream in Big Stone County, Minnesota
- Stony Run, Pennsylvania
- Stony Run Township, Yellow Medicine County, Minnesota
- Stony Run (Anderson Creek tributary), a stream in Clearfield County, Pennsylvania

== See also ==
- Stony Brook (disambiguation)
- Stony Run Creek
- Stony Creek (disambiguation)
