= Stoney Creek Township, Indiana =

Stoney Creek Township, Indiana may refer to one of the following places:

- Stoney Creek Township, Henry County, Indiana
- Stoney Creek Township, Randolph County, Indiana

See also

- Stoney Creek Township (disambiguation)
