= Washington Monument (Baltimore) =

Monument in Baltimore, Maryland, U.S.

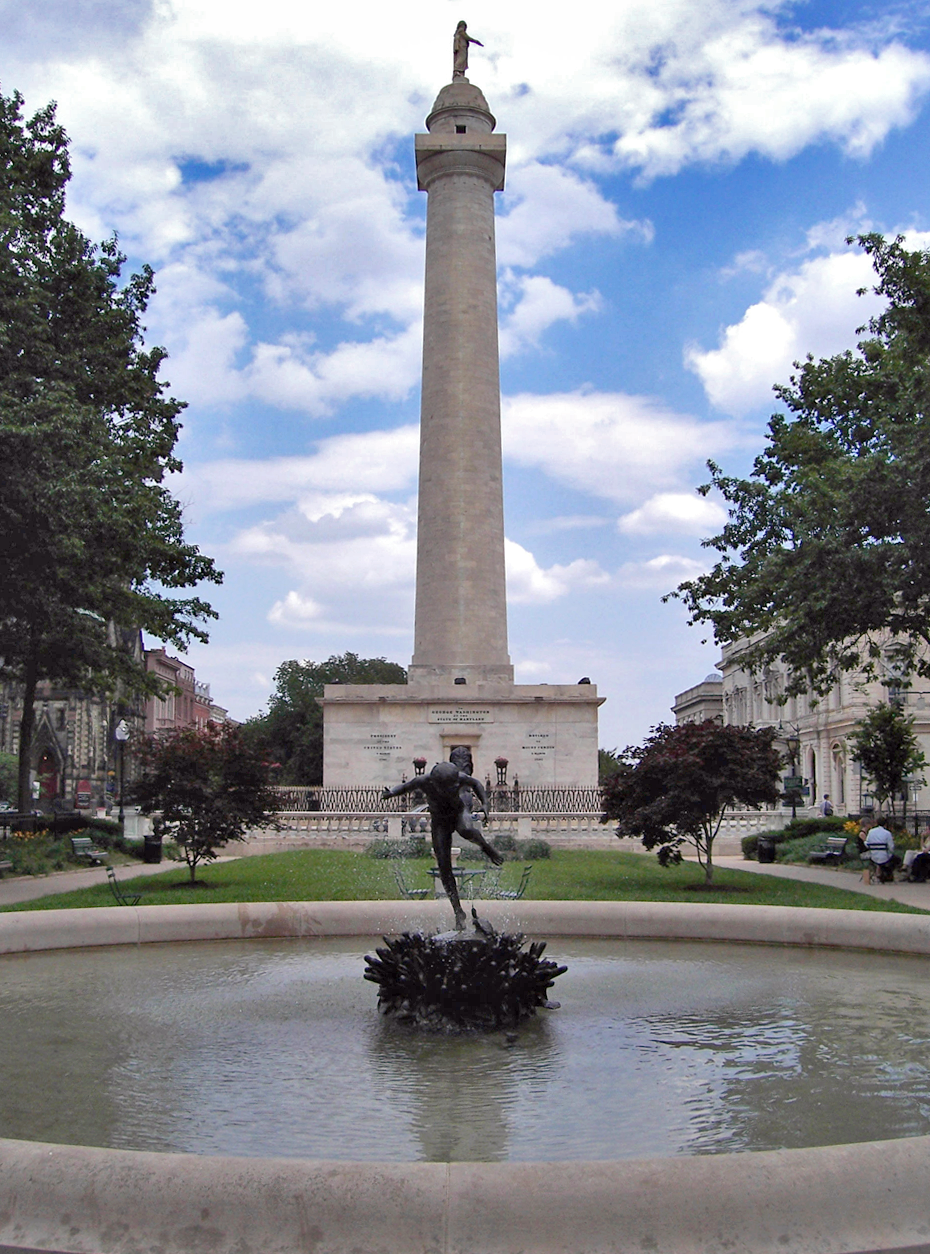
- The Washington Monument in Baltimore
- Interactive map of Washington Monument
- Location: Baltimore, Maryland, United States
- Coordinates: 39°17′51.2″N 76°36′56.4″W
- Designer: Robert Mills
- Type: Colossal Doric column
- Material: White marble
- Height: 178 feet 8 inches (54.46 m)
- Beginning date: 1815
- Completion date: 1829
- Opening date: 1815 [site visitation]
- Dedicated to: George Washington

Baltimore City Landmark
- Designated: 1975

The Washington Monument is the centerpiece of intersecting Mount Vernon Place and Washington Place, an urban square in the Mount Vernon-Belvedere neighborhood north of downtown Baltimore, Maryland. It was the first major monument to honor George Washington (1732–1799).

== History ==
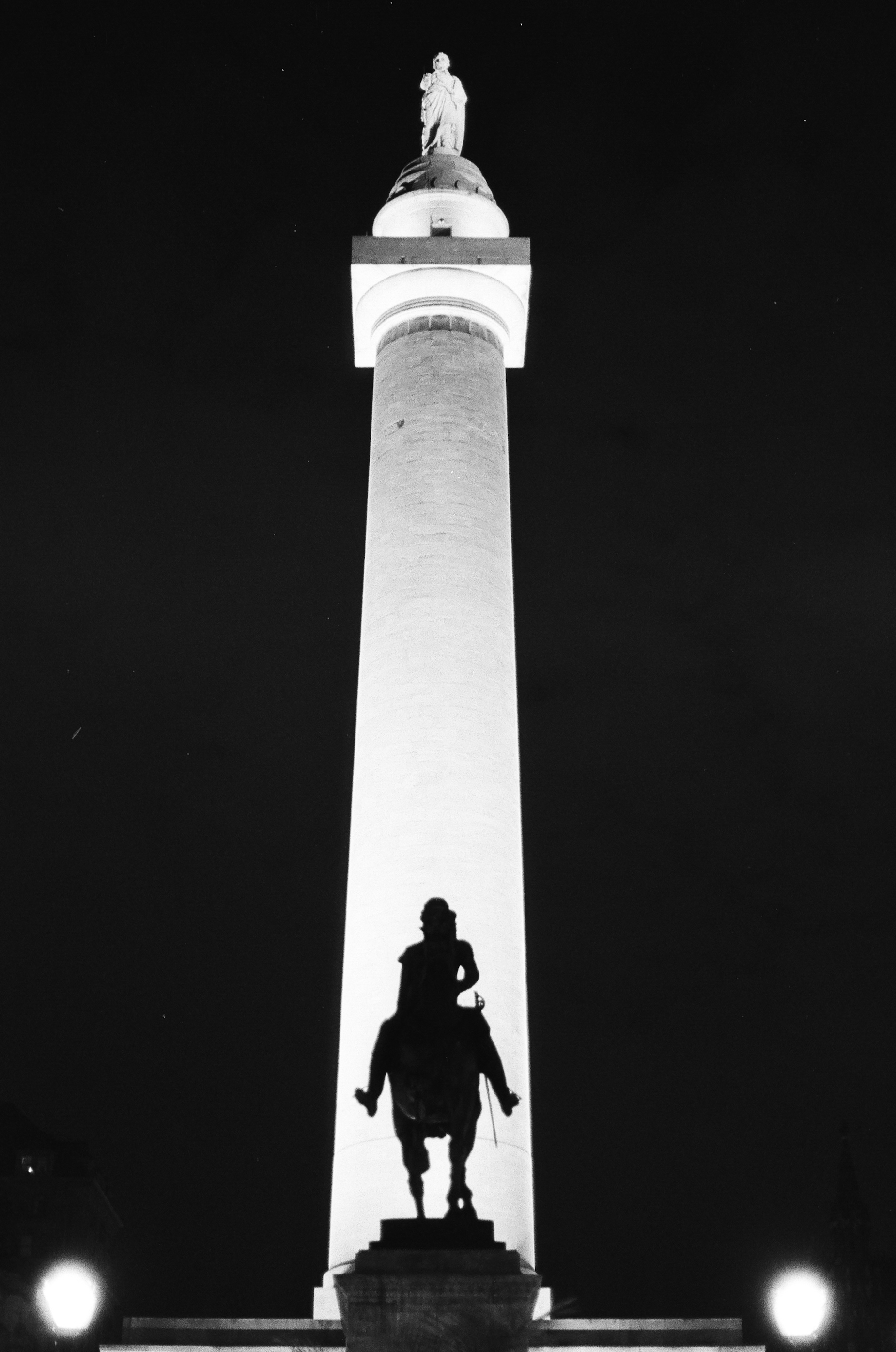
Washington Monument - Baltimore, 35mm, Ilford HP5, 2025

The Monument, a colossal landmark column, was designed by American architect Robert Mills (1781–1855), who also designed the later Washington Monument on the National Mall in Washington, D.C. Construction began in 1815 on land donated by Colonel John Eager Howard (1752–1827), from his extensive "Belvidere" estate just north of Baltimore Town, and the masonry work was completed by 1829. The 178 foot, 8 inch doric column holds a ground-floor gallery offering digital exhibits about the construction of the Monument, the history of Mount Vernon and Washington Places neighborhood and of the life and accomplishments of General and President George Washington. Climbing the 227 steps to the top provides a view of the city from the historic neighborhood where it is located. Its neighbors and cultural institutions within a few blocks include the Peabody Institute, the Walters Art Museum, the Central Library of the Enoch Pratt Free Library, the Maryland Center for History and Culture with its Enoch Pratt Mansion, the Basilica of the National Shrine of the Assumption of the Blessed Virgin Mary (old Baltimore Cathedral), and the Baltimore School for the Arts (public high school).

The glorification of Washington began long before his death at his Mount Vernon estate, along the Potomac River in Virginia in December 1799. The old Confederation Congress (1781–1789 under Articles of Confederation and Perpetual Union) had first announced a desire for a sculpture in his honor in 1783 after the end of the War and of General Washington's resigning of his commission and after his death, revived the idea of a memorial. However, these expressions of honor in the national capital floundered and would not be realized for decades. A monument honoring Washington in Baltimore, then an up-and-coming rising town, the third largest in North America, was first proposed as early as 1807, and in 1809 a Board of Managers of private citizens formed to commission and fund the monument intended to be erected in the old former colonial-era Courthouse Square on North Calvert Street, between East Lexington and East Fayette Streets (today's location of the Battle Monument Square, constructed simultaneously 1815–1822). In 1810, the first lottery authorized by the General Assembly of Maryland, was held. In 1813, an architectural competition was announced with a $500 prize to design and build the Monument at a cost of $100,000. Mills's design was chosen in 1814, the architect having taken pains to demonstrate to the Board of Managers that he was the first native born American with architectural training. The cornerstone was laid with great ceremony on Independence Day, July 4, 1815.

Mills's competition-winning designs included rich ornamentation, six iron galleries (balconies) dividing the exterior shaft into seven sections with text and images on each level highlighting important moments in Washington's life. An interior spiral staircase led to the top, where surmounting the column Washington was depicted in a quadriga. Concerns over the expense of this design, as well as its projected height caused later changes in not only its design, but location. Residents of old Courthouse Square feared the tall column would fall on their houses in the event of some natural disaster, so a new location was found in Howard's Woods, north of the city, on the "Belvidere" estate and with a 200 square feet of surrounding land for future public squares/parks, which was donated by noted leading citizen, American Revolutionary War hero, Col. John Eager Howard, (1752–1827) of the famed "Maryland Line" regiment of the Continental Army.

By the time the Monument's cornerstone was laid in Howard's Woods in 1815, Mills had significantly simplified the original elaborate design as depicted in an account of the Fourth of July ceremony. The design of the completed column is very similar to the Colonne Vendôme in Paris, which ultimately derived from Trajan's Column in Rome and was adopted in this time of the increasing popularity of Neoclassicism in American architecture.

The dignified cornerstone ceremony was overseen by the Monument's Board of Managers. Board President and noted citizen, James Buchanan observed that the city of Baltimore had not only "the glory of being the first to erect a monument of gratitude to the father and benefactor of our country," but that it had a "peculiar propriety" in erecting "this first expression of national gratitude," because of its successful defense against the British Army and Royal Navy during the Battle of Baltimore the previous fall.

At the ceremony it was declared that the Monument was to stand as "memorial of the blessings and advantages that our country derived from the character of and conduct of that personage whose name it is to bear, and whose virtues it is to perpetuate." Following speeches, the cornerstone was laid by Levin Winder, then governor of Maryland and head of the Maryland Freemasons, in a dignified masonic ceremony. The entire proceedings were printed in the local newspaper, picked up by newspapers in other major cities, and published in a souvenir booklet with illustrations.

Baltimore's Washington Monument, 1890 (looking north)

Almost from the moment the cornerstone was laid, and particularly as the structure began to rise out of the ground (the first marble was laid in 1816), the Monument was a destination and an active memorial. In June 1817, during fifth president James Monroe's visit to the city, his itinerary included a visit to the Monument. Construction sites in the early nineteenth century were not what they are today, and during the building period it is clear the Monument was visited inside and out. As early as 1819 guests were leaving evidence of their visit in the Monument's subterranean vaults. By shortly after 1820 with the column proper largely complete with its integral interior staircase, visitors were already climbing to the top. New York City newspaper editor Nathaniel H. Carter visited in February 1823 and climbed to the top, escorted by a boy with a candle, to take in the views of the city.

The monument, constructed of marble from three quarries further north in Baltimore County, Maryland, rises 178 feet 8 inches and consists of three main elements: a low, square base containing a gallery; a plain, unfluted column; and, atop the column, a standing figure of Washington. The marble was sourced from three quarries: the base from General Charles Carnan Ridgely's (1760–1829), quarry, (near his Baltimore County estate of Hampton Mansion near Towsontown), the column and other details from Scott's quarry, and the statue from the quarry of Mrs. Frances D. T. Taylor.

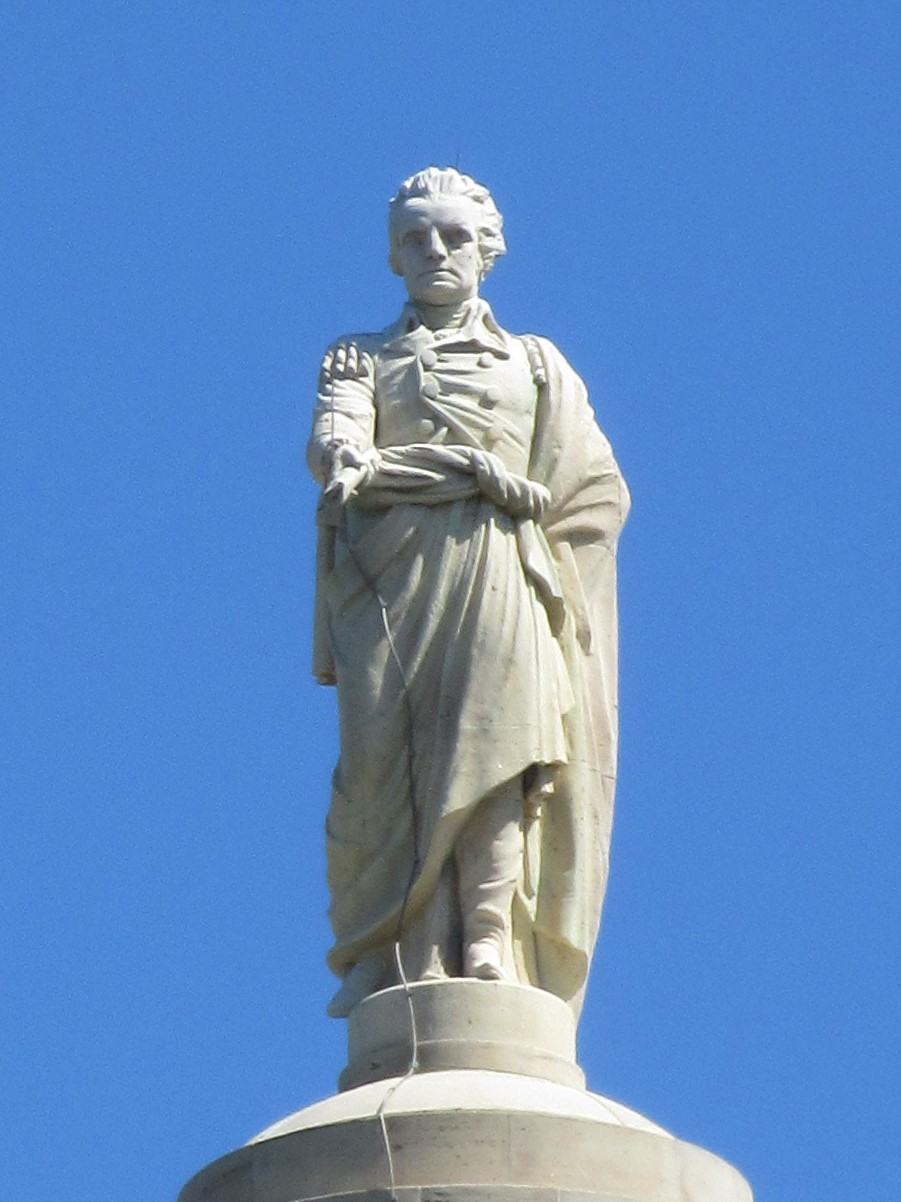
Statue by Causici of George Washington's resignation as commander-in-chief

Washington is depicted on the top of the Monument resigning his commission as Commander-in-Chief of the Continental Army, an act which took place in the Old Senate chamber in the Maryland State House in the state capital of Annapolis, Maryland, on December 23, 1783. The Confederation Congress was meeting in the Maryland capitol which served for a few months as the temporary national capital. While there, the Congress also ratified the Treaty of Paris of 1783, ending the American Revolutionary War and recognizing the independence of the United States by Great Britain.

The statue was carved by Italian-born sculptor Enrico Causici, who previous to his work on the Monument had been employed carving reliefs for the United States Capitol. William Rusk, in his book Art in Baltimore: Monuments and Memorials, tells the following story about the raising of Causici's marble statue of Washington in 1829. "Tradition recalls a prodigy occurring when the statue was raised to the summit of the monument – a shooting star dashed across the sky and an eagle lit on the head of the settling general."

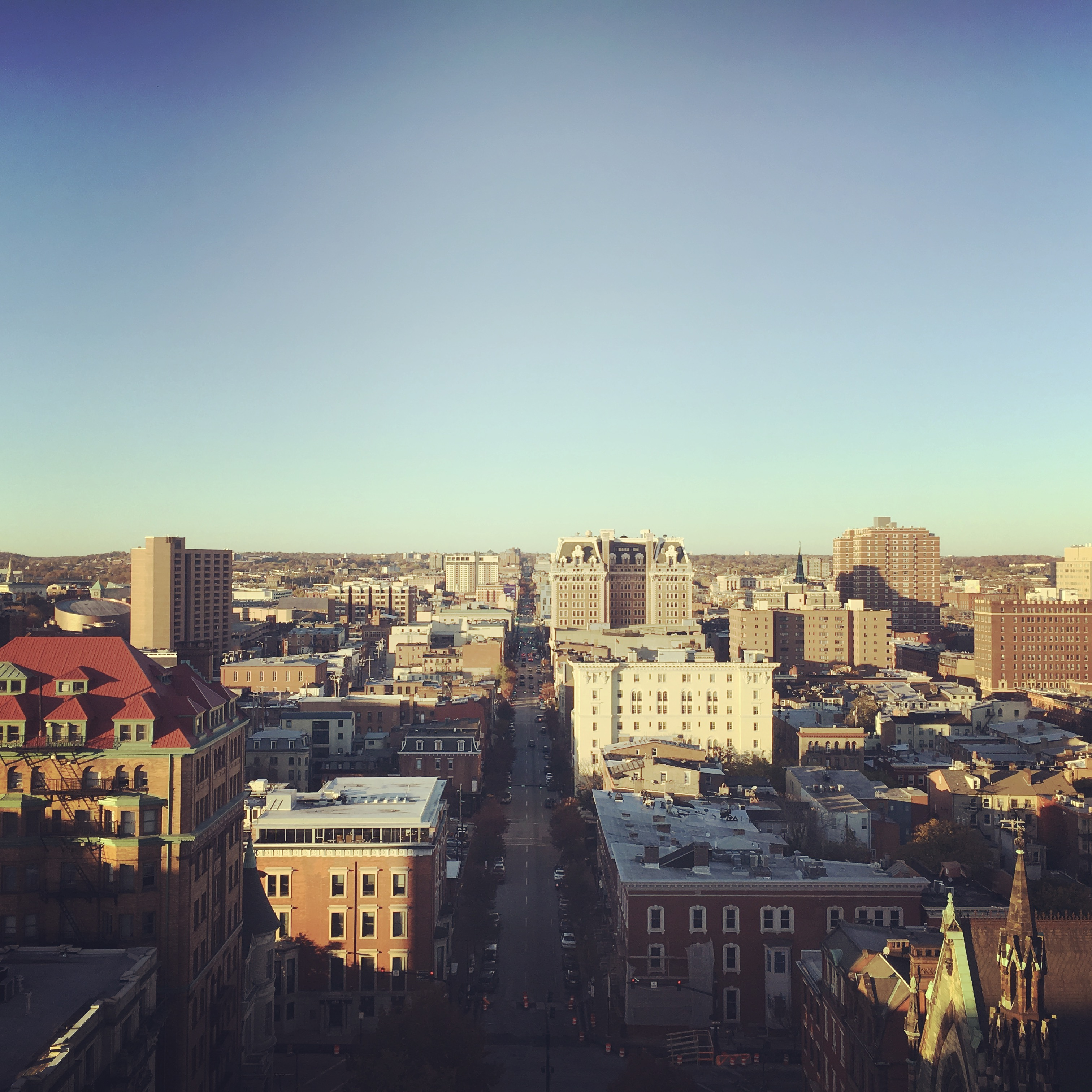
View from the top of the monument

Details added to the monument in the 1830s include the bronze inscriptions on all facades documenting eight principal events in George Washington's life, including his military and presidential career. Former president John Quincy Adams assisted the monument's board of managers in determining the wording of these events. The interior of the monument was stuccoed at this time and exterior wood doors installed, painted to imitate ancient Roman bronze doors. The cast-iron fence around the base was also designed by Mills and added in 1838. It contains symbolic references to the Maryland and the strength achieved through the union of the original thirteen colonies.

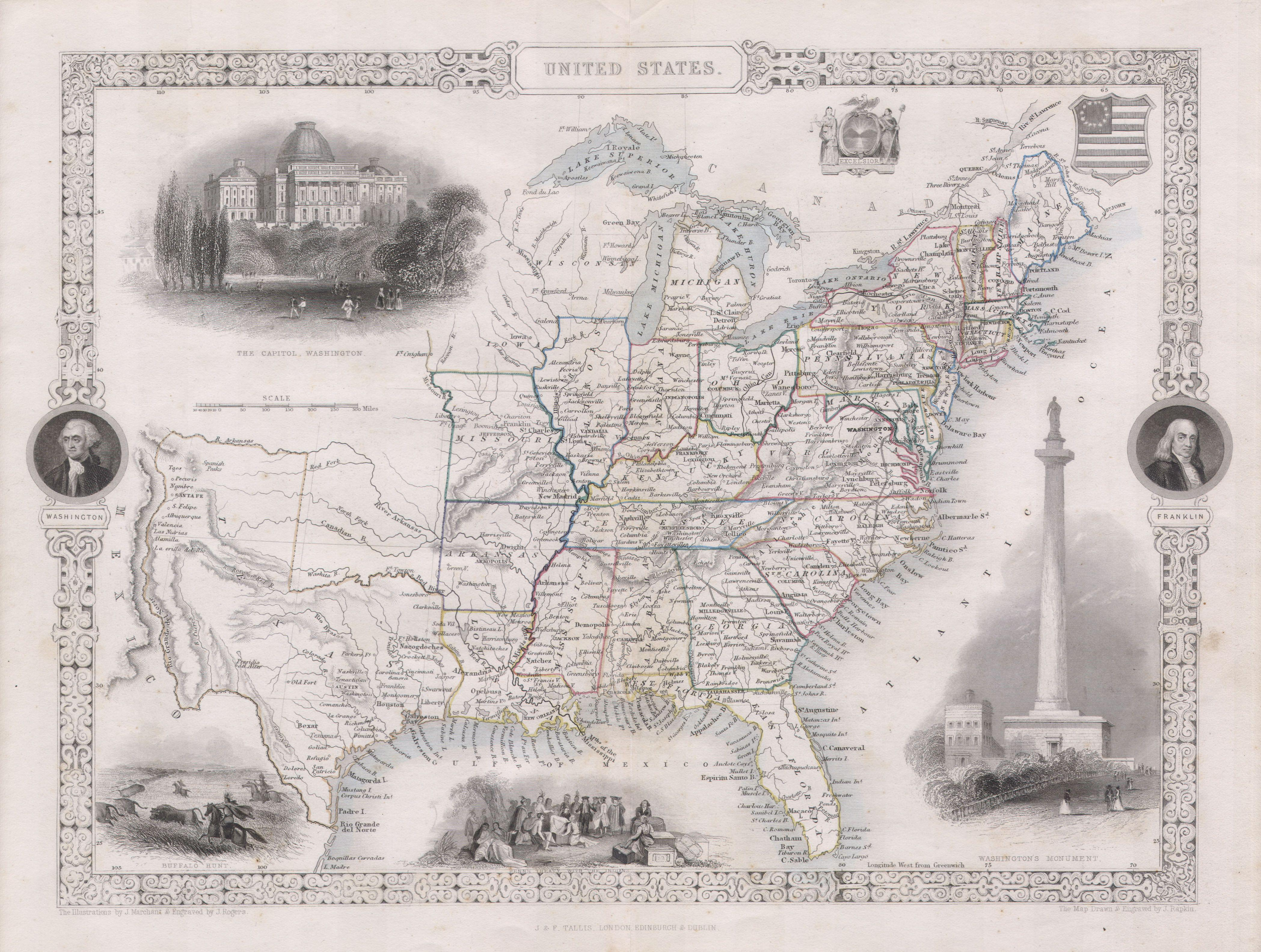
1850 Tallis Map of the United States (Texas at fullest extent) – Geographicus – United States-tallis-1850

Other memorials to Washington were erected in Maryland and in the nearby national capital, including the one now in Washington Monument State Park (near Boonsboro, Maryland and the Appalachian Trail), which was first constructed in 1827. The Boonsboro monument as it now stands reflects at least two rebuildings after the structure had fallen into ruin. In 1848 Mills's Washington Monument in the national capital was begun, but it would not be completed and dedicated until 1885. Because of this, for decades the Baltimore Washington Monument served as a leading symbol of American pride and gratitude towards George Washington, as a founding father and the first president of the nation. Mid 19th century maps, for instance, pair the Baltimore column with the Capitol building because the Washington, DC monument had only just begun.

The monument is now open for tourists.

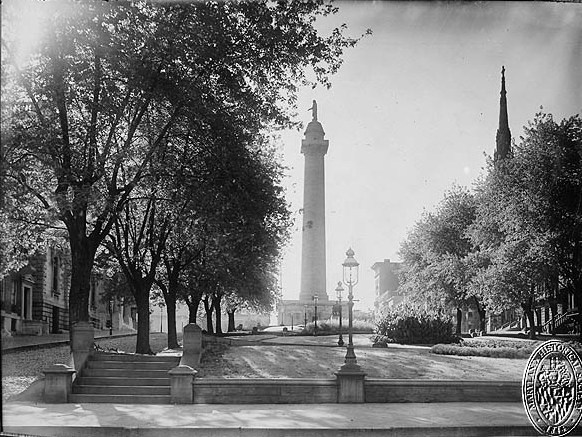
Baltimore's Washington Monument, 1900 (looking west)

== Lighting of the Washington Monument ==
Since 1971, the city has held the annual "Lighting of the Washington Monument" during the first Thursday in December. A holiday village is held prior to the lighting ceremony in the West Square of Mount Vernon Place. Typically, the flipping of the switch for the lights is followed by a fireworks show. After the lighting, the holiday lights remain on the monument until after Christmas Day. The 49th annual Downtown Partnership Monument Lighting was held virtually, due to the COVID-19 pandemic.

== Cultural references ==
- The Monument is referenced by Herman Melville (as Ishmael) in Chapter XXXV (The Mast-Head) of Moby-Dick (1851), "Great Washington, too, stands high aloft on his towering main-mast in Baltimore, and like one of Hercules' pillars, his column marks that point of human grandeur beyond which few mortals will go."
- In the show Ace of Cakes the star Duff does the ceremonial lighting of the Monument. He was quoted saying that Baltimore's monument was first, better, cooler, and lights up.
- The 1979 Hollywood film ...And Justice for All has a scene of Al Pacino running around the monument.
- The 1987 film The Bedroom Window, directed by Curtis Hanson, is set largely in Mount Vernon and is about an attempted murder that takes place at the base of the monument.
- In 1998, an opening scene to the movie Pecker was filmed in front of the Washington Monument. In audio commentary that accompanies the DVD, director John Waters states that the photo the film's titular character (played by Edward Furlong) takes of the monument is "the oldest dirty joke in Baltimore" due to the resemblance of Washington's extended arm to a large phallus when viewed from the angle at which the photo is taken.
- The TV show House of Cards includes some scenes of the monument and surrounding area such as the Peabody Institute and the Belvedere Hotel.

== Restoration ==
The Monument was closed in June 2010 by the City of Baltimore for safety reasons, according to articles in the Baltimore Sun and Washington Post newspapers. Missing mortar and rusted support brackets were among specific safety concerns. Several months later, a driver ran a 1997 Chrysler van through the southeast corner on October 30, 2010 and damaged roughly 15 feet of the fence. While reports initially indicated the Monument's closure would last three months, it was later determined that reopening would not take place until a renovation was completed. In 2012 the City of Baltimore entered into a partnership agreement with the Mount Vernon Place Conservancy to restore, maintain, and manage the Monument and parks squares of Mount Vernon Place.

The monument has undergone a $5.5 million restoration by the Mount Vernon Place Conservancy which began in January 2014. It was reopened and rededicated on July 4, 2015, in celebration of the bicentennial of the cornerstone being laid.

=== Time capsule discoveries ===
During the monument's restoration two time capsules were discovered, the Monument's original 1815 cornerstone and a 1915 Centennial time capsule. Although the Monument's cornerstone had long been known to exist, its exact location was unknown. The 1915 Centennial time capsule, however, had been forgotten to time. The first to be discovered, the 1915 time capsule, was a sealed copper box that had been placed behind a plaque in the monument during the centennial celebrations in 1915. It was discovered in October 2014.

In February 2015, during digging for a sewage tank, a second time capsule, the Monument's original cornerstone, was discovered containing three well preserved glass jars stuffed with and surrounded by newspapers from July 1 and July 3, 1815, the days right before the laying of the cornerstone. The cornerstone was a nearly perfect granite cube with a marble lid, weighing between 1,000 and 1,500 pounds (roughly 450 to 700 kg). Besides the jars, the cornerstone contained a panel carved by local stonemasons and carvers of the time, and is expected to contain additional items, including coins and a metal plate. Like the 1915 capsule, the cornerstone contents were taken to the Walters Art Museum for analysis.

The contents of the 1815 cornerstone were fully revealed, and the 1915 time capsule opened, on June 2, 2015, at the Walters Art Museum. Among many interesting artifacts, the 1815 cornerstone contents included a copy of the United States Declaration of Independence printed in the (Baltimore) Federal Gazette on July 3, 1815, the day before the cornerstone was laid. The newspaper was folded open to the page printing the Declaration, and appears to be the last item placed in the stone. This inclusion suggests that to those who built the Monument in 1815, it was not just the first monument to honor America's founding father, George Washington, but also one of the earliest American monuments celebrating American national independence.

The contents of both time capsules can be seen on public display at the Maryland Center for History and Culture, located just two blocks from the monument.

== Historic designation ==
The Washington Monument is the centerpiece the public squares of Mount Vernon Place, which comprise the Mount Vernon Place National Historic Landmark District, designated in 1971. The Historic District is in turn within the Mount Vernon neighborhood of Baltimore, and the Baltimore National Heritage Area.

== See also ==
- Cultural depictions of George Washington
- List of memorials to George Washington
- List of statues of George Washington
- List of public art in Baltimore
- List of statues
- List of sculptures of presidents of the United States
- List of tallest structures built before the 20th century
- Presidential memorials in the United States
- Washington Monument State Park
