= Stone Creek =

Stone Creek may refer to:

- Stony Creek (Sacramento River tributary), California
- Stone Creek (New Jersey)
- Stone Creek, Ohio
- Stone Creek, Virginia
- Stone Creek Settlement, now Lost City, California
- Stone Creek Township, Bottineau County, North Dakota

== See also ==
- Steinbach (disambiguation)
- Stoner Creek (disambiguation)
- Stoney Creek (disambiguation)
