= Stonycreek Township =

Stonycreek Township may refer to the following places:

- Stonycreek Township, Somerset County, Pennsylvania
- Stonycreek Township, Cambria County, Pennsylvania

== See also ==
- Stoney Creek Township (disambiguation)
- Stonycreek (disambiguation)
