= Michael Zittle Jr. =

American occultist and author (1798–1877)

Michael Zittle, Jr.
- The Zittle family of South Mountain
- Born: October 5, 1798; Washington County, Maryland, US
- Died: July 5, 1877 (aged 78); Boonsboro, Maryland, US
- Resting place: Boonsboro Cemetery
- Occupations: Occultist; poet; novelist; mountaineer
- Spouse: Catherine Koogle (m. 1825; died 1872)
- Children: 2
- Parent(s): Michael Zittle Sr. and Mary Magdalena Hiestand Zittle

Michael Zittle Jr. (German: Michael Zittel) (October 5, 1798 – July 5, 1877) or The Wizard of South Mountain was an American occultist, ceremonial magician, author, and mountaineer. He was born to a German father, American mother, and was one of nine children. Zittle became popular in the area as healer, he would offer his services to alleviate a wide array of difficulties, such as compelling a thief to return stolen property, providing a “sure cure for fever," closing a wound from firearms, curing the bite of a mad dog and “dispelling the fear of the darkness of night.”

== A Friend In Need ==
A Friend in Need; Or, Secret Science was a handbook written by Zittle in 1845 on how to perform magic spells. It was based on a German book of magic, referred to by Zittle's neighbors as his "black book" or "conjuring book". According to legend, after publication of the book, Zittle lost his powers as a result of trying to commodify his supernatural powers. In 1975, a copy of the published English book was found by Boonsboro resident Pauline Routzahn. Today, a copy of both the English and original German can be viewed at the Boonsbourough Museum of History.
