= Stoney Creek Farm =

Coordinates: 39°30′59.04″N 77°41′55.99″W

Stoney Creek Farm is located in Boonsboro, Maryland. It is near the American Civil War battlefield Antietam, Washington Monument State Park, and the Appalachian Trail.

It was owned by the Schlosser family as early as April 6, 1841, when local deed records show it was transferred from Joel Schlosser to his wife and children. It is likely that the structure had been built shortly after 1835, when Joel was married to Catherine Doub, a member of the Doub (family).

The home was held by the Schlossers for almost 140 years, until March 30, 1973, when they sold it to Clarence B. Crane. Stoney Creek Farm stayed in the Crane family until July 24, 2000, when it was sold to Mark and Kimberly Schmidt. On October 31, 2004, it was sold to Brandon Green, Joseph Farone, and David Kempton.

The trio restored it in 2005 and it is now a quiet bed and breakfast with four bedrooms and an event site hosting numerous weddings, private parties and corporate retreats throughout the year.

== Joel Schlosser's Ancestors ==
According to local deed records, Joel Schlosser is the first recorded owner of the property known today as Stoney Creek Farm. The Schlosser family has long ties to Boonsboro and Washington County, Maryland, and parts of Pennsylvania after their immigration from Germany in the late 18th century. In fact, Joel’s brother David served as the mayor of Boonsboro from 1869 to 1872, and many family members are buried in the Boonsboro Reformed Church Graveyard or on private property close by. The Schlessor family owned the farm for almost 140 years.

Joel Schlosser transferred ownership of the farm to his wife and children on April 6, 1841. It was likely obtained by Schlosser as part of a larger parcel belonging to his father, John Schlosser. Transfers of land between family members did not require the governmental deed recordation until the mid-19th century in most cases. It is likely that the structure had been built shortly after 1835, when Joel was married to Catherine Doub.

Joel’s father John Schlosser had been born in Germany on April 2, 1782, and his mother, the former Elizabeth Painter, had been born on September 21, 1783. They married about 1798, and had seven children, including: Simon (born about 1799), Eli (born between 1801 and 1818), Sarah (born December 13, 1804), Mary (born between 1802 and 1829, David (born October 25, 1814), Samuel (born 1822), and Joel, the owner of 19223 Manor Church Road, who had been born on November 11, 1810. His father John (died August 20, 1862), and mother Elizabeth (died July 19, 1855) are both buried in the Reformed Church Graveyard in Boonsboro, Maryland.

Joel’s grandfather, Peter Schlosser, was born about 1736 in Pennsylvania. He died on October 23, 1834, on his homestead in Washington County, and was buried “on farm by Iron Bridge, Antietam Creek.” The bridge was later referred to in the local newspapers as Schlosser’s Bridge, located adjacent to their farm holdings. He had married the former Susannah Regnas in Cumberland, Maryland, on April 4, 1769, who had been born in Germany on September 28, 1749, and they had four children together, including John. Susannah died on Halloween in 1830, and is buried adjacent to her husband.

Joel’s great-grandfather was also named Peter Schlosser, and he had been born on January 20, 1709, in Hilsbach, Germany, where he was baptized five days later at the Hilsbach Reformed Church. He and his brother Leonhardt came from Germany by way of Rotterdam via Plymouth aboard the ship Dragon, arriving in Philadelphia in 1732. Peter took the oath of allegiance to the British Crown on September 30, 1732, in Philadelphia. He died on January 18, 1790, in Sharpsburg, Maryland, and is buried in the Old Reformed Churchyard there. His large tombstone still stands at the cemetery, and is written in German. Sometime after 1734, he married the former Maria Margaretha Waschenbach, who had been born in 1713 in Eichen, Germany.

== Joel and Catherine Schlosser ==
Joel was first enumerated at the farm in the 1840 census, which was little more than a head count of persons living in the county. He is listed as the Head of Household, along with an indication that his wife was between the age of 20 and 30, along with two children, both under the age of 5. Joel had married the former Catherine Doub in Frederick, Maryland, on April 20, 1835, when she was about age 19. She had been born in Fredrick on January 4, 1816.

Joel and Catherine had three children together eventually: Josiah, born about 1836; Enos, born on June 27, 1838; and Daniel, born on June 16, 1843. Daniel died less than a year later, on April 23, 1844. He is buried at the Mt. Hebron 1st U.B. Church in Eakle’s Mill, Maryland.

Joel’s son Enos Schlosser married the former Mary Eleanor Hoover (born February 19, 1845) on January 4, 1866. They had a son Edward Thomas who was born on December 26, 1867. Enos acted as the executor of his father’s will in 1879, and later died on March 11, 1912.

Joel’s eldest son Josiah continued to live with his parents and would eventually take ownership of the estate and operate the farm along with his own family. Joel and Catherine and son Josiah were enumerated at the farm in the 1870 census, which listed Joel as a retired farmer at the young age of 59. Catherine lied about her age, claiming that she was then age 43, when in fact she was 54. Son Josiah was then age 31 and single, indicating that he worked as a farmer. Joel listed the value of his real estate at an impressive $22,000, and the worth of his personal belongings as $1,000 ($322,000 today). Josiah listed a personal wealth of belongings as $1,200. The Schlosser’s also had a Caucasian domestic servant living with them on the farm named Sarah Derr, who was then age 19.

A notice appeared in the January 17, 1866, edition of the Hagerstown Herald & Torch Light newspaper that mentioned Schlosser’s Fording, a low area across Antietam Creek adjacent to the farm where wagons could cross the riverbed. The state planned on building a bridge with two stone arches, both with a span of fifty feet that would carry an iron bridge far above the riverbed. The bridge was damaged in 1881, requiring residents to again traverse across the creek bed for a short time, as posted in a later edition of the newspaper.

Joel Schlosser died on October 18, 1879, and was buried in the Boonsboro Cemetery. Just two years previous, his brother Samuel sold a farm close by known as the “Williams Farm” for $12,000 to an individual known as Nathaniel Mumma. A notice of the sale was reprinted from the Boonsboro’ Odd Fellow in the November 21, 1877, edition of the Hagerstown Herald & Torch Light newspaper.

The 1880 census was enumerated at the farm, and listed Catherine as the head of the household; this time, she correctly stated her age of 64. The census revealed that her son Josiah had married sometime in the previous ten years to the former Savilla Doub, a close relative of his mother’s that was fourteen years his junior. She had been born in Maryland in December 1848.

Catherine Schlosser died on March 16, 1890, at the age of 74, and was buried next to her husband Joel in the Boonsboro Cemetery.

== Joel and Catherine Schlosser's Descendants ==
The 1890 census for the country was almost completely destroyed by a fire where it was being stored, before it could be copied, making it difficult to determine occupants of houses during that year. The next census taken at the farm was in 1900, which indicated that Josiah had died sometime between 1883 and 1900. His wife Savilla was listed as the Head of the Household, and working as a farmer as a 51-year-old widow.

The 1900 census also revealed that Josiah and Savilla had four children together, three of whom were alive and living on the farm. They included: Minnie, born in August 1880; Harvey J., born November 2, 1881; and son Alvey D., born February 9, 1883. Both sons indicated they worked as laborers on the farm.

Harvey Jonathon Schlessor registered for the World War I draft on September 12, 1918. His draft card listed his stature as medium height and build, with light blue eyes and light brown hair. His brother Alvey Daub Schlessor registered the same day, and was noted to be of short height with light brown eyes and dark brown hair.

Josiah and Savilla’s three children remained single and at the farm during their lifetimes. Harvey was listed as the Head of Household beginning in the 1910 census, and would continue to be listed as such through the 1930 census, the last available for researchers. Minnie and Alvey would also continue to be listed at the form as single individuals through 1930, along with their mother Savilla, who died sometime after 1930. The family was joined by a single, 54-year-old Aunt named Carmelus Doub in 1910, who worked as a dressmaker in the house. The 1930 census revealed that the Schlosser’s enjoyed a radio in the farmhouse, one of the more unusual questions asked of the time.

The three Schlosser children continued to live at the farm until 1973. Alvey had died on November 7, 1957, Minnie died in August 1973, and Harvey in February 1980.

== The Cranes ==
Minnie and Harvey sold the house on March 30, 1973, to Clarence B. and Helene F. Crane after an approximately 140-year tenure by the Schlosser family.

Clarence was originally from Wisconsin, and Helene from the District of Columbia. After purchasing the farm across the Antietam Creek, the Crane family moved there in 1966, years before buying the adjoining farm, later named Stoney Creek Farm, by other owners. One son, Richard Lawrence Crane, always called Larry, moved into the farmhouse (Stoney Creek), married Carol Crane, and they had one son, Jason. He farmed full-time, raising beef cattle, on both farms.

Larry, later operated a retail greenhouse business in Boonsboro, called Mountainside Gardens, which he expanded into a wholesale nursery on the farm, along with his second wife, Laurie. They added a kitchen and great room extension to the farmhouse, as well as an office and greenhouses. After Larry died in a plane crash, Laurie inherited the farm and business.

== The Schmidts ==
Laurie Crane sold the farm to Mark and Kimberly Schmidt on July 24, 2000. The Schmidts installed electrical service and utilities to most of the buildings on the property, built the addition on the side of the bank barn, restored the spring house and raised its floor to prevent flooding, constructed the guest house, renovated the garage into an office and remodeled the hog barn to accommodate Kimberly’s desire to run a horse-boarding business on the farm. They also removed the greenhouses from the property, created several miles of riding trails and installed fencing and frame stables for the horses. They also rezoned the property and put it into Environmental Conservation to protect and preserve it from future commercial exploitation.

== SCF, LLC ==
Mark and Kimberly Schmidt sold the farm to Brandon Green, Joseph Farone, and David Kempton on October 31, 2004. It has been a bed and breakfast since the trio finished renovating it. Green, Farone, and Kempton formed SFC, LLC which now owns and operates Stoney Creek Farm.

Since the purchase four and a half baths have been added and a fifth totally remodeled. The rooms have been painted, papered, sanded, and decorated trying to keep in mind the heritage of the home while trying to bring it into the 20th century. New appliances for the kitchen and a face lift to the cabinetry were needed. Much of the flooring throughout the house has been replaced, sanded, or reconditioned using as much material as possible from the farm, such as the wood planks on the floor of the dining room that were formally in the attic.
