= Toby Creek (Mallard Creek tributary) =

Stream in North Carolina, USA

Toby Creek Tributary to Mallard Creek
- Location of Toby Creek mouth Toby Creek (Mallard Creek tributary) (the United States)

Location
- Country: United States
- State: North Carolina
- County: Mecklenburg
- City: Charlotte

Physical characteristics
- Source: Sugar Creek divide
  - location: Junker Community in Charlotte, North Carolina
  - coordinates: 35°16′12″N 080°45′51″W
  - elevation: 742 ft (226 m)
- Mouth: Mallard Creek
  - location: northside of Charlotte, North Carolina
  - coordinates: 35°19′05″N 080°44′10″W
  - elevation: 590 ft (180 m)
- Length: 4.15 mi (6.68 km)
- Basin size: 5.12 square miles (13.3 km^{2})
- Discharge
  - location: Mallard Creek
  - average: 5.98 cu ft/s (0.169 m^{3}/s) at mouth with Mallard Creek

Basin features
- Progression: Mallard Creek → Rocky River → Pee Dee River → Winyah Bay → Atlantic Ocean
- River system: Pee Dee River
- Tributaries
  - left: unnamed tributaries
  - right: unnamed tributaries
- Bridges: Autumnwood Lane, West Rocky River Road, Chancellor Park Drive, University City Boulevard (NC 49), W.T. Harris Boulevard (NC 24), Johnson Alumni Way, Phillips Road, Lynx Blue Line

Toby Creek is a 4.15 mi (6.68 km) long 1st order tributary to Mallard Creek in Mecklenburg County, North Carolina.

== Course ==
Toby Creek rises in the Junker community of Charlotte, North Carolina and then flows northeast through the northern suburbs of Charlotte to eventually join Mallard Creek. Toby Creek runs through the campus of UNC Charlotte on its ways to Mallard Creek.

== Watershed ==
Toby Creek drains 5.12 square miles (13.3 km^{2}) of area, receives about 46.6 in/year of precipitation, has a wetness index of 416.62, and is about 14% forested.

== Restoration ==
Roughly 7,900 feet (2,400 m) of Toby Creek between W.T. Harris Boulevard and its confluence with Mallard Creek were part of a stream restoration project that concluded in June 2023. The banks of the creek were reshaped and replanted with native grasses, shrubs, and trees in order to control erosion, improve water quality, increase wildlife habitat, and restore the floodplain to its natural state and function.
