= Bowman House (Boonsboro, Maryland) =

Historic house in Maryland

- U.S. National Register of Historic Places
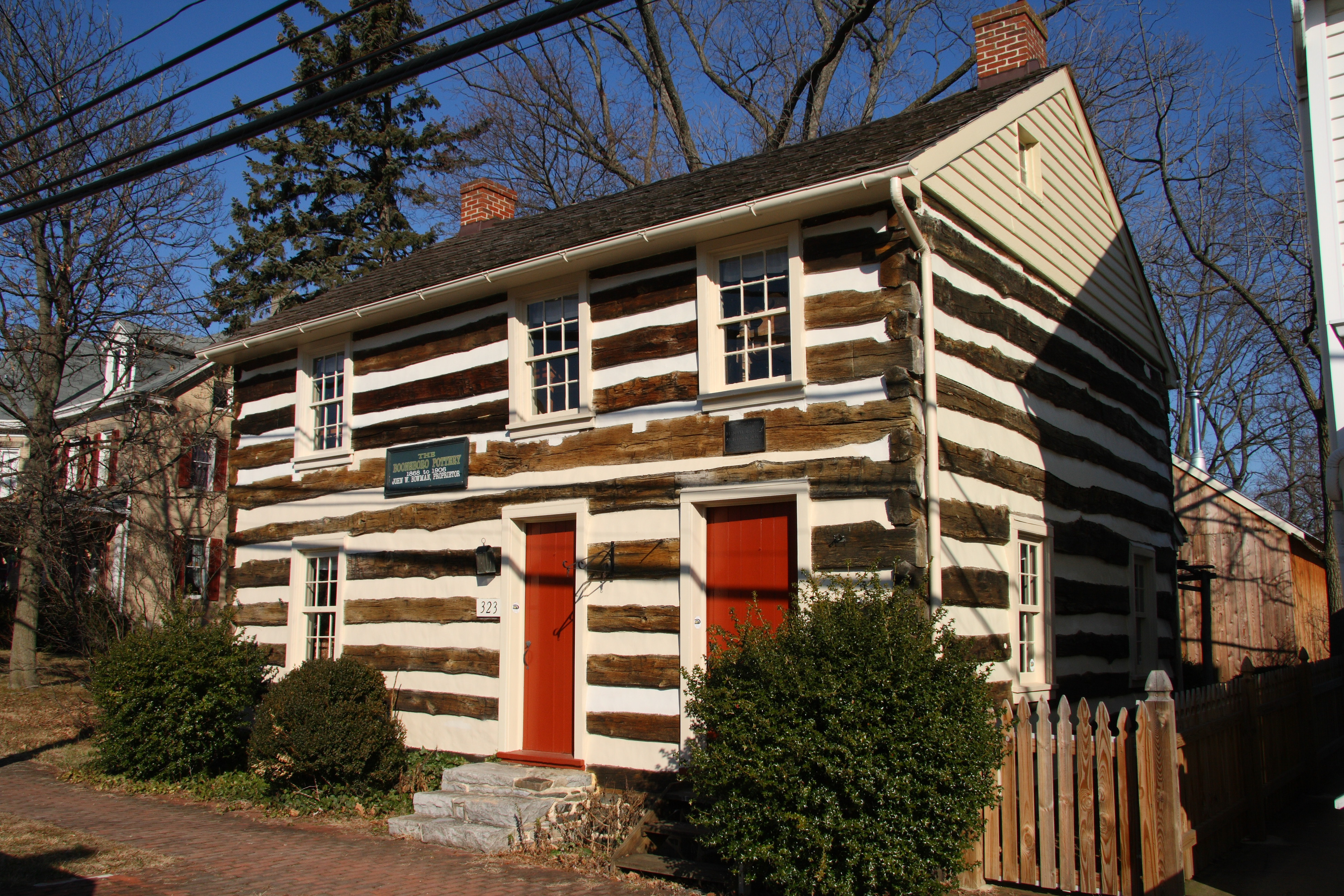

- Location within Maryland Location within the United States
- Location: 323 N. Main St., Boonsboro, Maryland
- Coordinates: 39°30′42.27″N 77°39′17.88″W
- Area: less than one acre
- Built: 1826
- NRHP reference No.: 77000702
- Added to NRHP: April 29, 1977

The Bowman House is a historic log house located at 323 North Main Street in Boonsboro, Maryland, and is locally significant as a typical example of those built in the area in the early 19th century.

== Description and history ==
The house and its immediate grounds housed the "Boonsboro Pottery" from 1868, owned by John E. Bowman. The pottery closed by 1908, succumbing to mass-produced materials. The building is now the headquarters of the Boonsboro Historical Society.

It was listed on the National Register of Historic Places on April 29, 1977.
