= Stoney Creek =

Stoney Creek may refer to:

== In Australia ==
- Stoney Creek, Queensland, historical spelling of the rural community of Stony Creek, Queensland
- Stoney Creek Falls, in Queensland
  - "Stoney Creek (song)", a 2021 song by Xavier Rudd

== In Canada ==
- Stoney Creek, Ontario, was a municipality that is now part of Hamilton, Ontario
  - Stoney Creek (electoral district), a defunct federal electoral district in Ontario
  - Stoney Creek (provincial electoral district), a defunct provincial electoral district in Ontario
- Stoney Creek (Battle River), a watershed in Alberta that drains into the Battle River
- Stoney Creek (Lynn River), a watershed administered by the Long Point Region Conservation Authority, that drains into Lake Erie
- Stoney Creek, London, Ontario, a community in London, Ontario
  - Stoney Creek (Thames River), a watershed administered by the Upper Thames River Conservation Authority, that drains into Lake Erie via Lake St. Clair
- Battle of Stoney Creek, a battle of the War of 1812
- Saik'uz First Nation, often referred to as Stoney Creek First Nation (Canada)

== In the United States ==
- Stoney Creek (Delaware River tributary in Delaware)
- Stoney Creek (North Carolina), a stream in Wayne County
- Stoney Creek (Ararat River tributary), a stream in Surry County, North Carolina
- Stonycreek River or Stoney Creek, a tributary of the Conemaugh River in southwestern Pennsylvania
- Stoney Creek Farm, a bed and breakfast in Boonsboro, Maryland
- Stoney Creek Records, a subsidiary of Broken Bow Records
- Stoney Creek Secondary, a Conrail Line in Pennsylvania and Delaware
- Stoney Creek (Delaware River tributary)
- Stoney Creek Township (disambiguation)

== See also ==
- Stony Creek (disambiguation)
- Stonycreek (disambiguation)
- Steinbach (disambiguation)
