= Mallard Creek (Rocky River tributary) =

Stream in North Carolina, USA

Mallard Creek Tributary to Rocky River
- Location of Mallard Creek mouth Mallard Creek (Rocky River tributary) (the United States)

Location
- Country: United States
- State: North Carolina
- County: Cabarrus; Mecklenburg
- City: Harrisburg; Charlotte

Physical characteristics
- Source: Irwin Creek divide
  - location: pond in northeast Charlotte, North Carolina
  - coordinates: 35°18′36″N 080°49′17″W
  - elevation: 800 ft (240 m)
- Mouth: Harrisburg, North Carolina
  - location: pond in northside of Charlotte, North Carolina
  - coordinates: 35°20′18″N 080°39′47″W
  - elevation: 546 ft (166 m)
- Length: 12.23 mi (19.68 km)
- Basin size: 41.54 square miles (107.6 km^{2})
- Discharge
  - location: Rocky River
  - average: 44.78 cu ft/s (1.268 m^{3}/s) at mouth with Rocky River

Basin features
- Progression: Rocky River → Pee Dee River → Winyah Bay → Atlantic Ocean
- River system: Pee Dee River
- Tributaries
  - left: Clarks Creek; Stony Creek
  - right: Doby Creek; Toby Creek
- Bridges: Crestland Avenue, W Sugar Creek Road, Hubbard Road, NC 24, Mallard Creek Road, David Taylor Drive, I-85, US 29, E Mallard Creek Church Road, I-485, Pavillion Boulevard, Morehead Road

Mallard Creek is a 12.23 mi (19.68 km) long 3rd order tributary to the Rocky River in Mecklenburg and Cabarrus County, North Carolina.

== Course ==
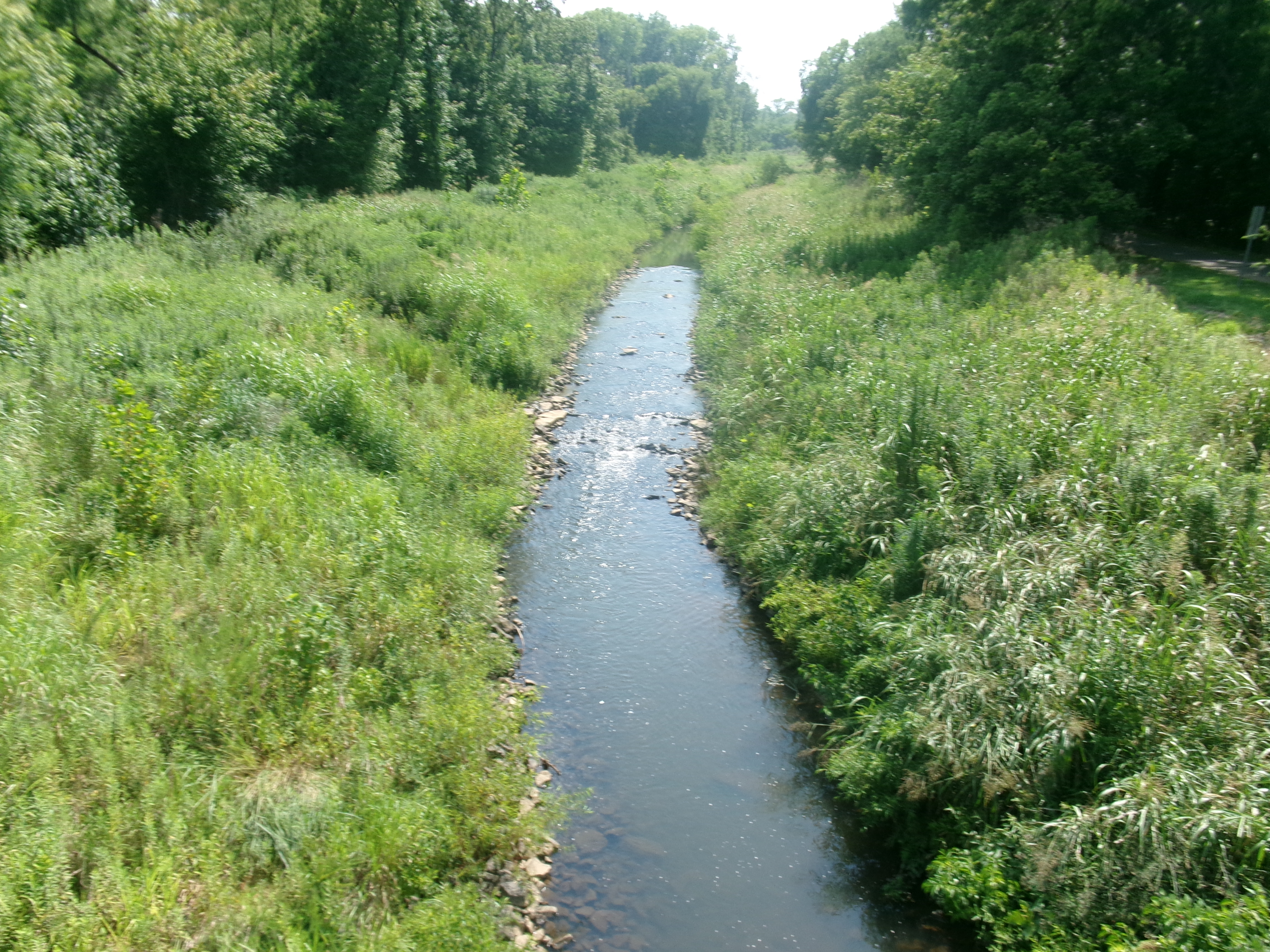
View of Mallard Creek from Mallard Creek Church Road.

Mallard Creek rises in a pond on the northside of Charlotte, North Carolina and then flows easterly through the northern suburbs of Charlotte into Cabarrus County to join the Rocky River in Harrisburg. The creek is shallow for much of its course, though it supports local populations of fox, deer, and duck.

== Watershed ==
Mallard Creek drains 41.54 square miles (107.6 km^{2}) of area, receives about 46.5 in/year of precipitation, has a wetness index of 417.80, and is about 22% forested.

== Greenway ==
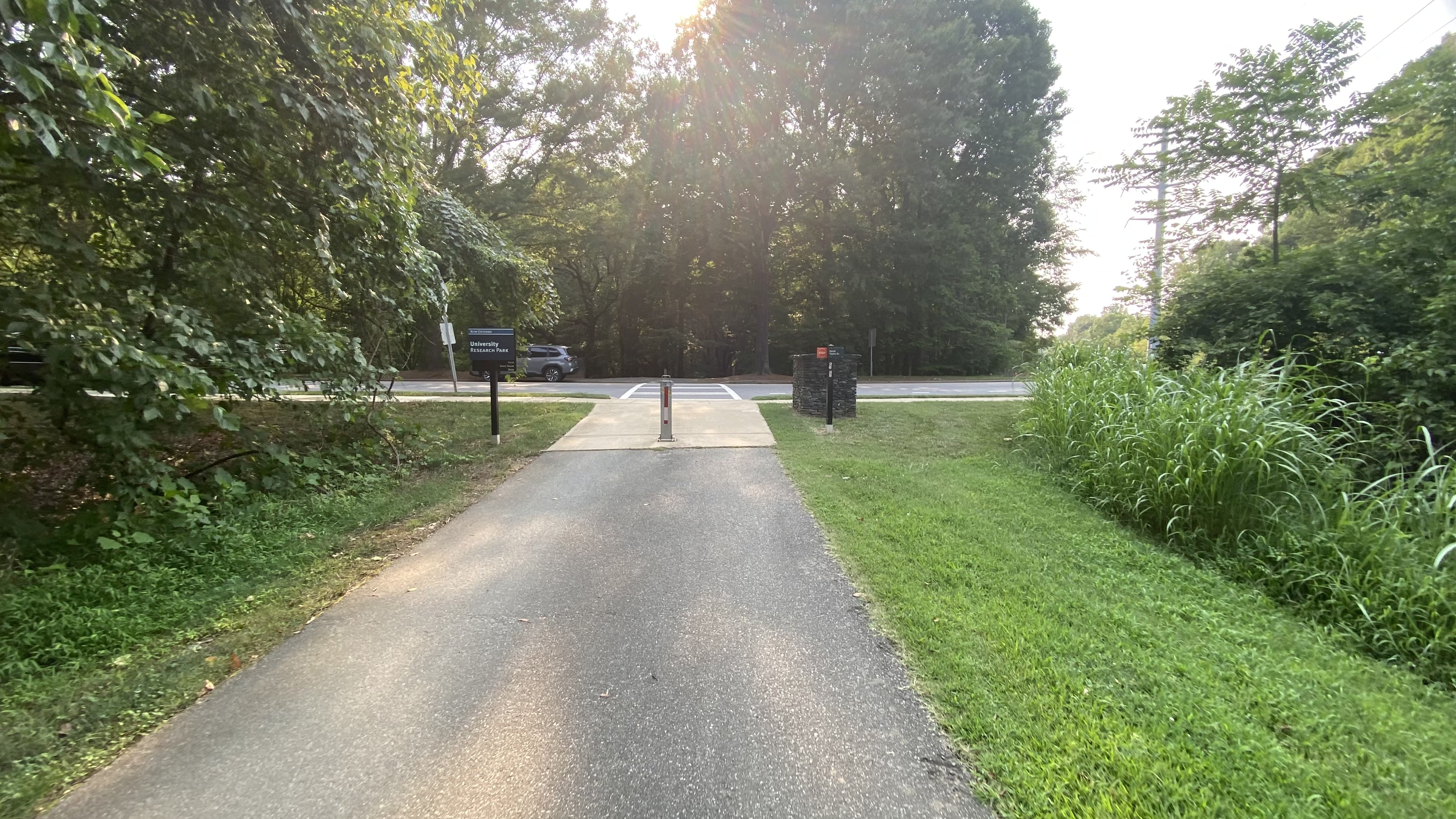
View of the Mallard Creek Greenway as it enters University Research Park.

The Mallard Creek Greenway roughly follows alongside the path of the creek through Mecklenburg County. Running 5.7 mi (9.2 km) in total, it is one of the longest continuous greenways in North Carolina's Piedmont region. It connects with several other northeast Charlotte greenways—most notably the Toby Creek Greenway, which passes through the University of North Carolina at Charlotte—providing pedestrian and bicycle access to local businesses, neighborhoods, parks, and university amenities. It is part of the Cross-Charlotte Trail project, a system of several interconnected greenways managed by the Mecklenburg County Parks and Recreation Department.
