= Keedy House =

Historic house in Maryland, United States

- U.S. National Register of Historic Places
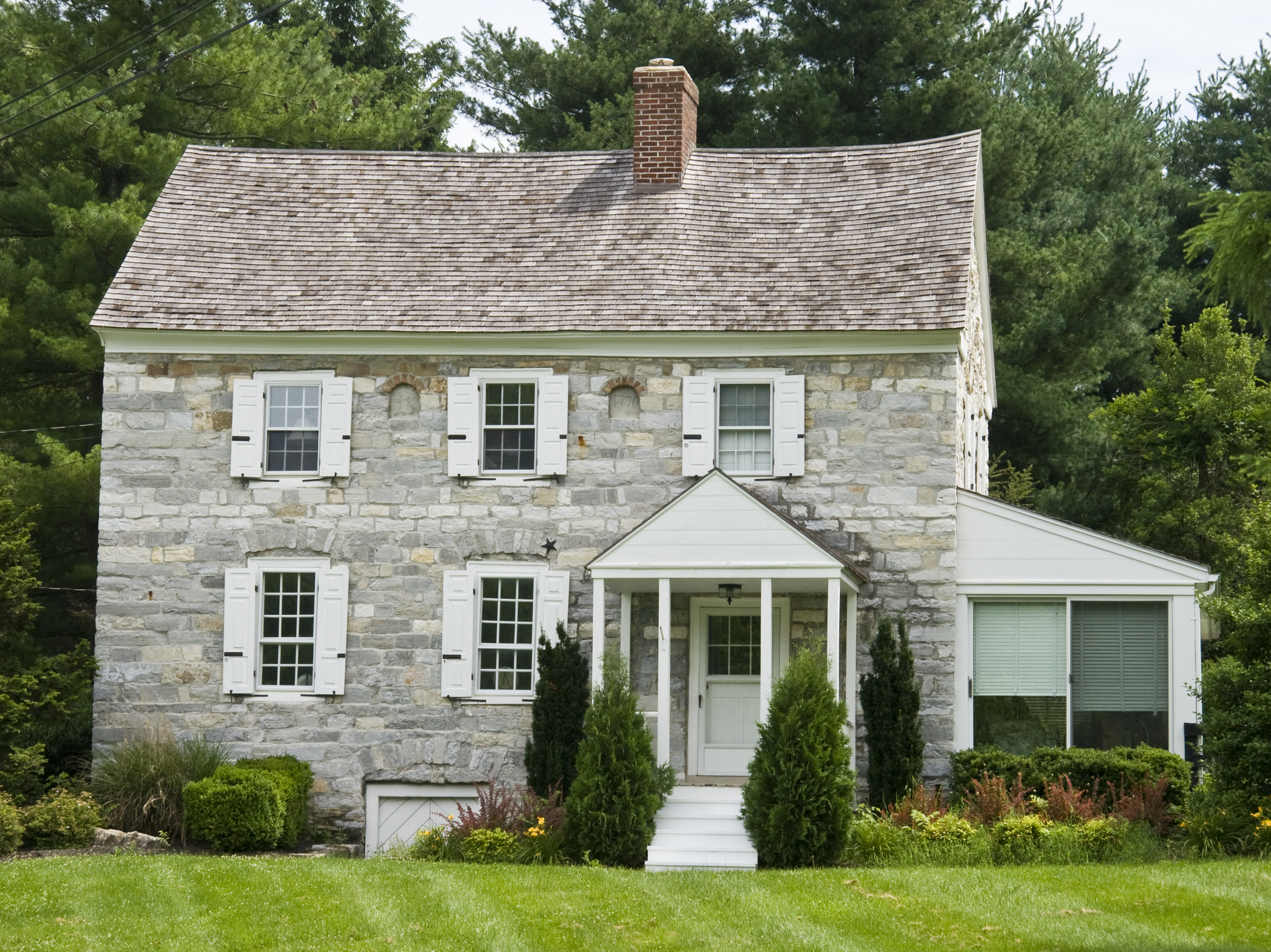
- Keedy House, June 2009

- Location within Maryland Location within the United States
- Location: Northwest of Boonsboro off U.S. Route 40A on Barnes Rd., Boonsboro, Maryland
- Coordinates: 39°32′22.44″N 77°41′54.90″W
- Area: 35 acres (14 ha)
- Built: 1790
- NRHP reference No.: 74000972
- Added to NRHP: July 25, 1974

The Keedy House is a historic home located at Boonsboro, Washington County, Maryland, United States. It is a 2 1/2-story home, three bays wide and two deep, built of coursed gray stone about 1790. Also on the property is a small stone bank house with a two-story porch and a small stone springhouse.

The Keedy House was listed on the National Register of Historic Places in 1974.
