= Stony Creek (Mallard Creek tributary) =

Stream in North Carolina, USA

Stony Creek Tributary to Mallard Creek
- Location of Stony Creek mouth Stony Creek (Mallard Creek tributary) (the United States)

Location
- Country: United States
- State: North Carolina
- County: Mecklenburg
- City: Charlotte

Physical characteristics
- Source: Clarks Creek divide
  - location: about 0.5 miles north of Charlotte, North Carolina
  - coordinates: 35°21′45″N 080°46′51″W
  - elevation: 756 ft (230 m)
- Mouth: Mallard Creek
  - location: northern boundary of Charlotte, North Carolina
  - coordinates: 35°19′56″N 080°43′05″W
  - elevation: 578 ft (176 m)
- Length: 3.24 mi (5.21 km)
- Basin size: 6.89 square miles (17.8 km^{2})
- Discharge
  - location: Mallard Creek
  - average: 7.97 cu ft/s (0.226 m^{3}/s) at mouth with Mallard Creek

Basin features
- Progression: Mallard Creek → Rocky River → Pee Dee River → Winyah Bay → Atlantic Ocean
- River system: Pee Dee River
- Tributaries
  - left: unnamed tributaries
  - right: unnamed tributaries
- Bridges: Mallard Creek Road, I-85, I-485, North Tryon Street

Stony Creek is a 3.24 mi (5.21 km) long 2nd order tributary to Mallard Creek in Mecklenburg County, North Carolina.

== Variant names ==
According to the Geographic Names Information System, it has also been known historically as:

- Stoney Creek

== Course ==
Stony Creek rises about 0.5 miles north of Charlotte, North Carolina and then flows southeast through the northern suburbs of Charlotte to eventually join Mallard Creek.

== Watershed ==
Stony Creek drains 6.89 square miles (17.8 km^{2}) of area, receives about 46.6 in/year of precipitation, has a wetness index of 419.66, and is about 31% forested.
