= Doby Creek (Mallard Creek tributary) =

Stream in North Carolina, USA

Doby Creek Tributary to Mallard Creek
- Location of Doby Creek mouth Doby Creek (Mallard Creek tributary) (the United States)

Location
- Country: United States
- State: North Carolina
- County: Mecklenburg
- City: Charlotte

Physical characteristics
- Source: Irwin Creek divide
  - location: Derita in Charlotte, North Carolina
  - coordinates: 35°17′22″N 080°47′39″W
  - elevation: 798 ft (243 m)
- Mouth: Mallard Creek
  - location: northside of Charlotte, North Carolina
  - coordinates: 35°19′11″N 080°45′10″W
  - elevation: 597 ft (182 m)
- Length: 4.23 mi (6.81 km)
- Basin size: 3.10 square miles (8.0 km^{2})
- Discharge
  - location: Mallard Creek
  - average: 3.69 cu ft/s (0.104 m^{3}/s) at mouth with Mallard Creek

Basin features
- Progression: Mallard Creek → Rocky River → Pee Dee River → Winyah Bay → Atlantic Ocean
- River system: Pee Dee River
- Tributaries
  - left: unnamed tributaries
  - right: unnamed tributaries
- Bridges: University City Boulevard, University Pointe Boulevard, NC 24

Doby Creek is a 4.23 mi (6.81 km) long 2nd order tributary to Mallard Creek in Mecklenburg County, North Carolina.

== Course ==
Doby Creek rises in the Derita community of Charlotte, North Carolina and then flows generally northeast through the northern suburbs of Charlotte to eventually join Mallard Creek.

== Watershed ==
Doby Creek drains 3.10 square miles (8.0 km^{2}) of area, receives about 46.4 in/year of precipitation, has a wetness index of 433.22, and is about 18% forested.
