= Ingram–Schipper Farm =

- U.S. National Register of Historic Places
- Location within Maryland Location within the United States
- Location: Mapleville Road (MD 66), near Boonsboro, Maryland
- Coordinates: 39°33′46″N 77°39′37″W
- Area: 50 acres (20 ha)
- NRHP reference No.: 79003259
- Added to NRHP: September 24, 1979

Ingram–Schipper Farm is a historic farm complex located near Boonsboro, Washington County, Maryland, United States. It is a two-story, four-bay Flemish bond brick dwelling with white trim and water table. The house features a Victorian period flat-roofed one-story porch and a slate roof. The property includes a number of early outbuildings, including a brick kitchen and wash house, three log buildings, one of which has a fireplace and appears to have been a dwelling, and a large stone barn.

It was listed on the National Register of Historic Places in 1979.
