= Stony Creek (Clinch River tributary) =

Stream in Scott and Wise County, Virginia, U.S.

Coordinates: 36°46′11.36″N 82°34′35.56″W

Stony Creek is a stream in Scott and Wise counties, Virginia, in the United States. It is a tributary of the Clinch River.

The name is descriptive of the creek bed.

== See also ==
- List of rivers of Virginia
