= Stonycreek =

Stonycreek can refer to:

- Stonycreek Township, Cambria County, Pennsylvania
- Stonycreek Township, Somerset County, Pennsylvania
- Stonycreek River, in Pennsylvania

== See also ==
- Stony Creek (disambiguation)
- Stoney Creek (disambiguation)
- Steinbach (disambiguation)
