= Stony Run (Minnesota) =

Stream in Big Stone County, Minnesota, U.S.

Coordinates: 45°15′23″N 96°20′58″W

Stony Run is a stream in Big Stone County, Minnesota, in the United States.

Stony Run was named from the numerous boulders along its course.

== See also ==
- List of rivers of Minnesota
