= Clarks Creek (Mallard Creek tributary) =

Stream in North Carolina, U.S.

Clarks Creek Tributary to Mallard Creek
- Location of Clarks Creek mouth Clarks Creek (Mallard Creek tributary) (the United States)

Location
- Country: United States
- State: North Carolina
- County: Mecklenburg
- City: Charlotte

Physical characteristics
- Source: Ferrelltown Creek divide
  - location: about 1.5 miles east of Joplor, North Carolina
  - coordinates: 35°22′27″N 080°47′50″W
  - elevation: 780 ft (240 m)
- Mouth: Mallard Creek
  - location: northside of Charlotte, North Carolina
  - coordinates: 35°19′37″N 080°46′31″W
  - elevation: 620 ft (190 m)
- Length: 4.34 mi (6.98 km)
- Basin size: 6.41 square miles (16.6 km^{2})
- Discharge
  - location: Mallard Creek
  - average: 7.46 cu ft/s (0.211 m^{3}/s) at mouth with Mallard Creek

Basin features
- Progression: Mallard Creek → Rocky River → Pee Dee River → Winyah Bay → Atlantic Ocean
- River system: Pee Dee River
- Tributaries
  - left: unnamed tributaries
  - right: unnamed tributaries
- Bridges: I-485, Dearmon Road, Saxonbury Way

Clarks Creek is a 4.34 mi (6.98 km) long 2nd order tributary to Mallard Creek in Mecklenburg County, North Carolina.

== Course ==
Clarks Creek rises about 1.5 miles east of Joplor, North Carolina and then flows south-southeast through the northern suburbs of Charlotte to eventually join Mallard Creek.

== Watershed ==
Clarks Creek drains 6.41 square miles (16.6 km^{2}) of area, receives about 46.3 in/year of precipitation, has a wetness index of 424.00, and is about 15% forested.
