= Stoner Creek =

Stoner Creek may refer to:

- Stoner Creek (Colorado), a stream in Colorado
- Stoner Creek (Kentucky), a stream in Kentucky
- Stoner Creek Stud, a racehorse
