= Little Stony Creek (North Fork Shenandoah River tributary) =

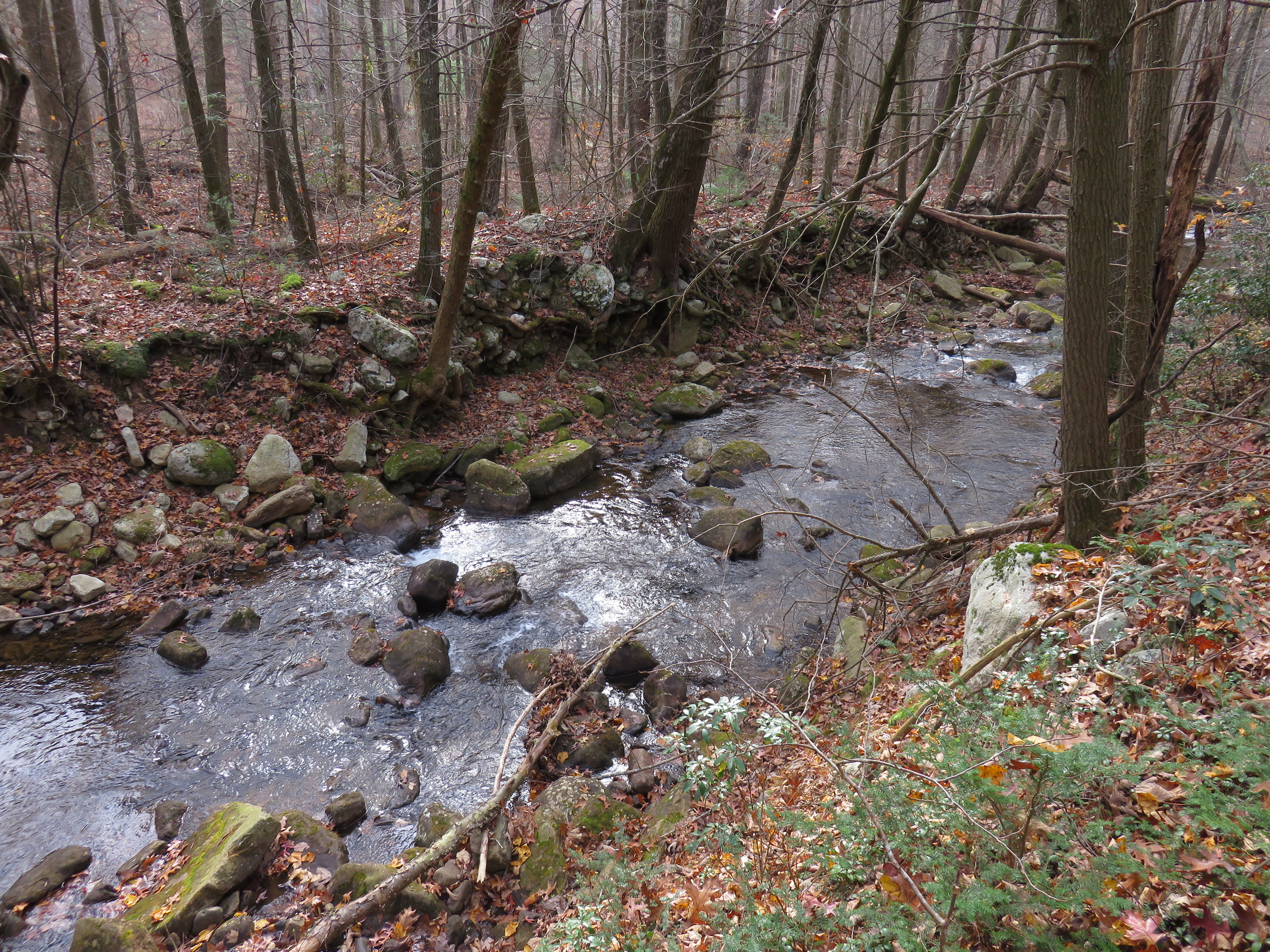
- Little Stony Creek north of the West End Reservoir, viewed from the Little Stony Creek Trail, 12 November 2017.

Location
- Country: United States
- State: Virginia
- County: Shenandoah County

Physical characteristics
- Mouth
  - location: Stony Creek
  - coordinates: 38°53′40″N 78°39′55″W
- Length: 6.8 mi (10.9 km)

Basin features
- Waterbodies: West End Reservoir
- GNIS feature ID: 1487056

Little Stony Creek is a 6.8 mile long river in the George Washington and Jefferson National Forests in the Commonwealth of Virginia. It is a first-order tributary of the North Fork Shenandoah River and the Potomac River.

== Physical description ==
The headwater of Little Stony Creek is at an altitude of about 3,000 feet, in a ravine between Sugar Knob and Mill Mountain, a few hundred feet from the Virginia-West Virginia border, about three miles northeast of Big Schloss.

=== West End Reservoir ===
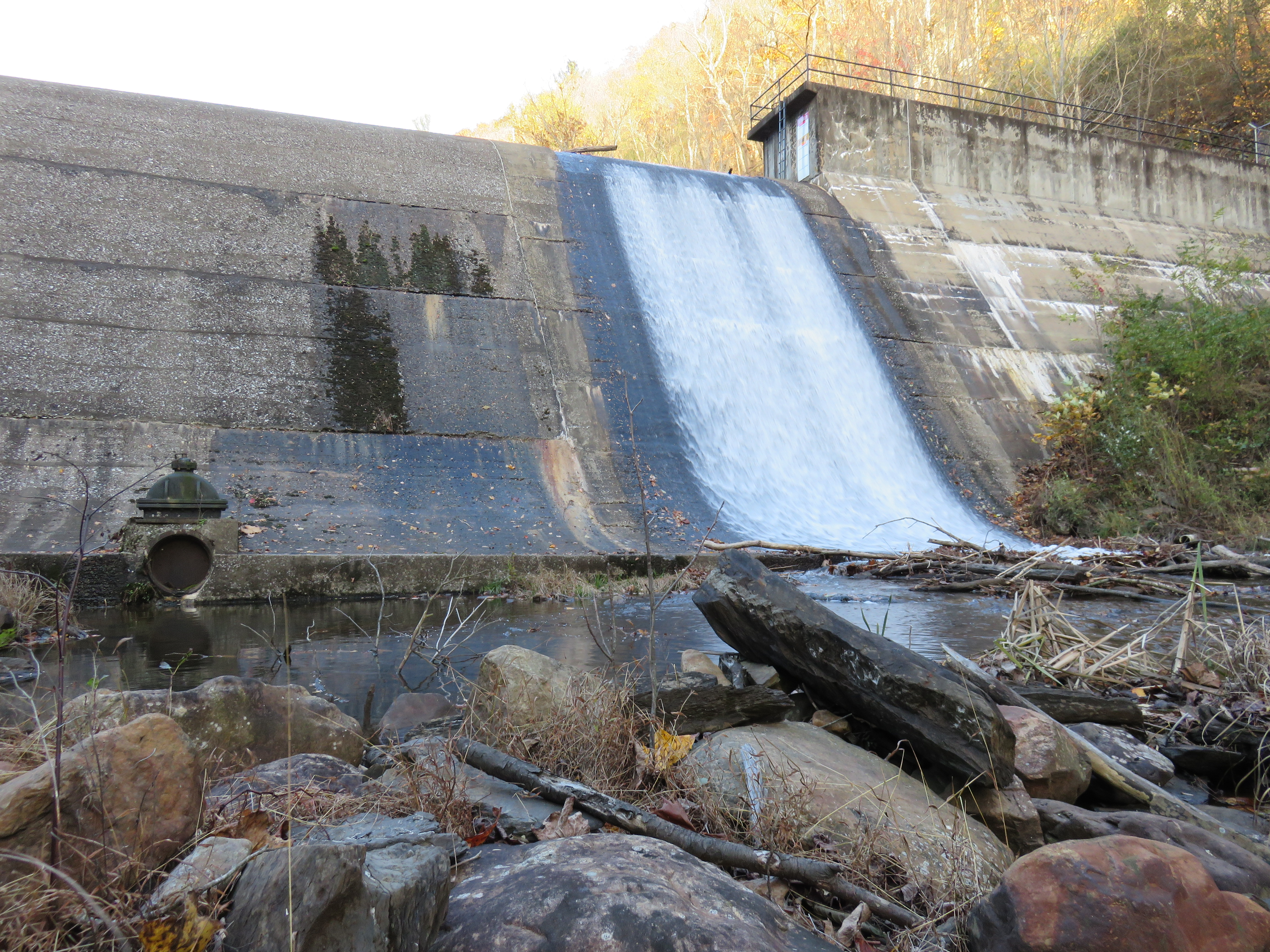
The Town of Woodstock, West End Reservoir Dam, 10 November 2017

At River Mile 1.9, Little Stony Creek is dammed by the West End Reservoir Dam (Virginia Department of Conservation and Recreation inventory number 17104 / Army Corps of Engineers National Inventory of Dams ID number VA17104). The dam is 388 feet long and 44 feet high and impounds 18 million gallons of water that used to be the water source for the nearby town of Woodstock. The dam was built in 1957–1958. Use of the reservoir was discontinued in 1979 and the town now draws its water from the North Fork Shenandoah River.

=== Wolf Gap Recreation Area ===
The river is accessible by the Little Stony Creek Trail, which is part of the Wolf Gap Recreation Area.
