= Stoney Creek Township =

Stoney Creek Township may refer to:

- Stoney Creek Township, Henry County, Indiana
- Stoney Creek Township, Randolph County, Indiana
- Stoney Creek Township, Caswell County, North Carolina, in Caswell County, North Carolina
- Stoney Creek Township, Wayne County, North Carolina, in Wayne County, North Carolina

== See also ==
- Stonycreek Township (disambiguation)
- Stoney Creek (disambiguation)
