= Washington Monument State Park =

Recreation area in Washington County, Maryland, US

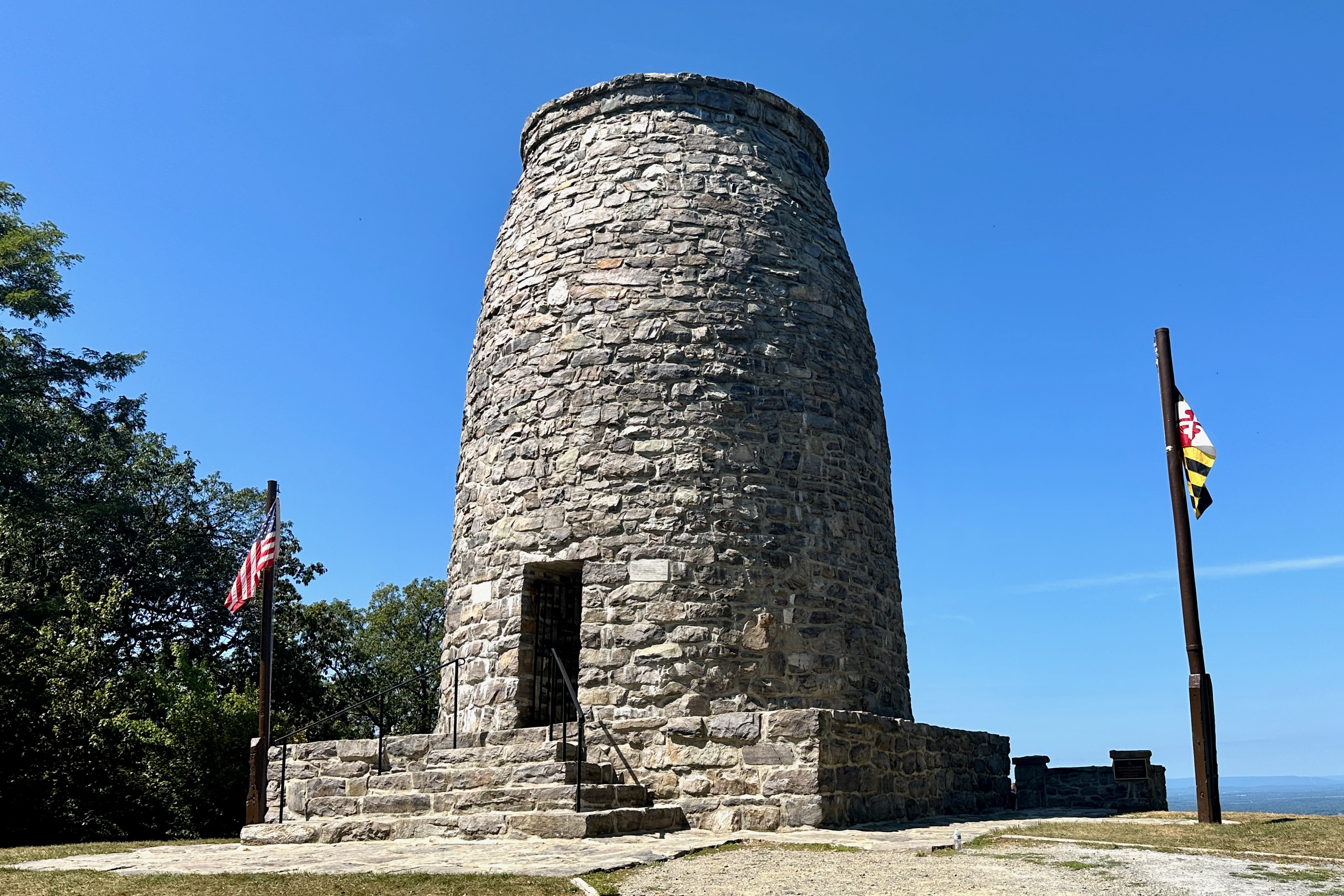
- Washington Monument

- Location within Maryland
- Location: Frederick and Washington counties, Maryland, United States
- Nearest town: Boonsboro, Maryland
- Coordinates: 39°30′01″N 77°37′22″W
- Area: 191 acres (77 ha)
- Elevation: 1,545 ft (471 m)
- Established: 1934
- Administrator: Maryland Department of Natural Resources
- Designation: Maryland state park
- Website: Official website
- Washington Monument
- U.S. National Register of Historic Places
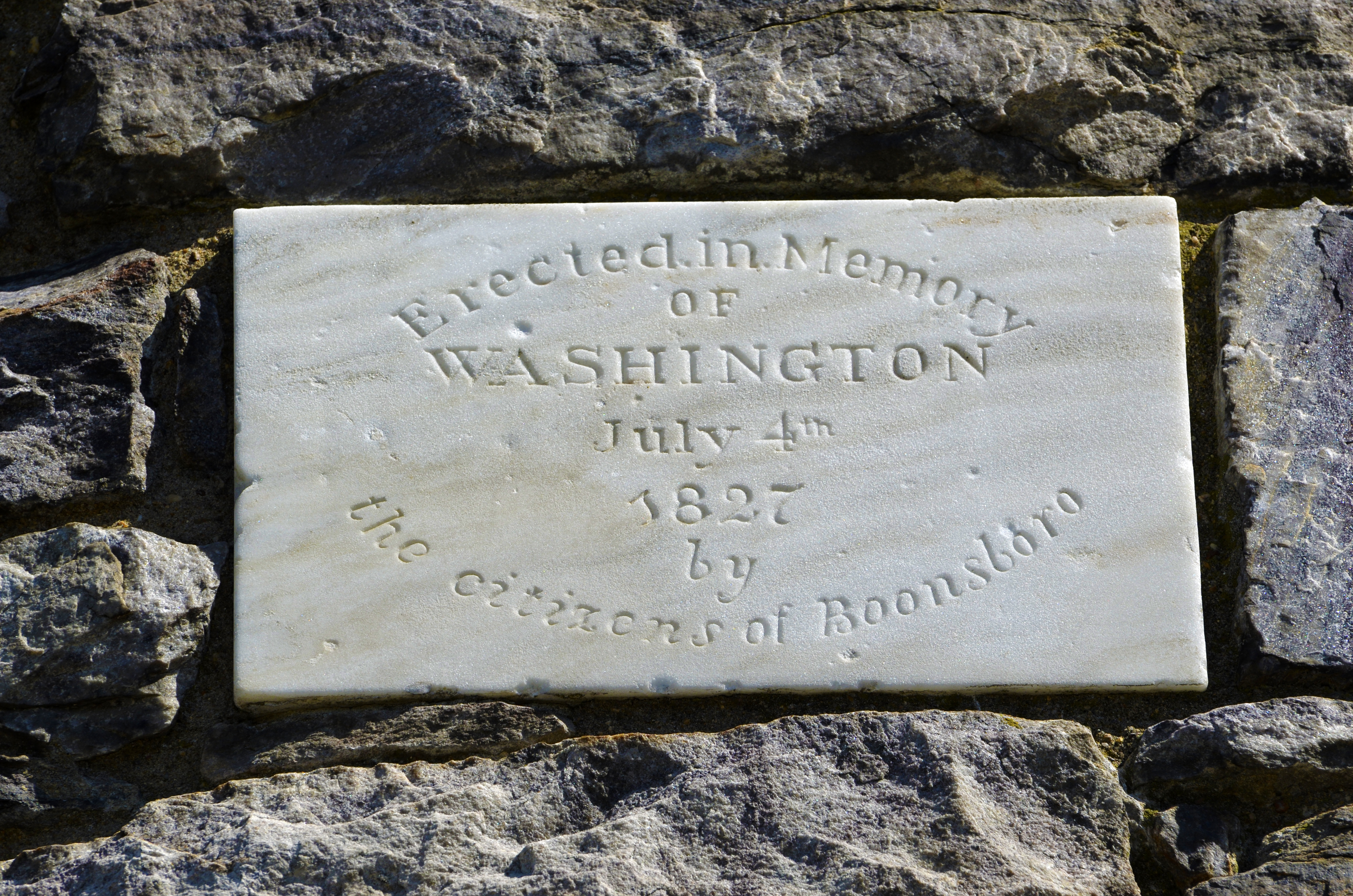
- Erected in Memory of Washington July 4th 1827 by the citizens of Boonsboro
- Nearest city: Boonsboro, Maryland
- Area: 104 acres (42 ha)
- Built: 1827
- Built by: Isaac C. Lutz
- NRHP reference No.: 72000588
- Added to NRHP: November 3, 1972

Washington Monument State Park is a Maryland state park located approximately one mile (1.6 km) southeast of Boonsboro, Maryland. The park preserves the Washington Monument, a 40-foot-tall (12 m) tower honoring George Washington, the first President of the United States. The monument sits along the Appalachian Trail near the summit of South Mountain's Monument Knob. It was added to the National Register of Historic Places in 1972. The park is managed by the Maryland Department of Natural Resources.

== History ==
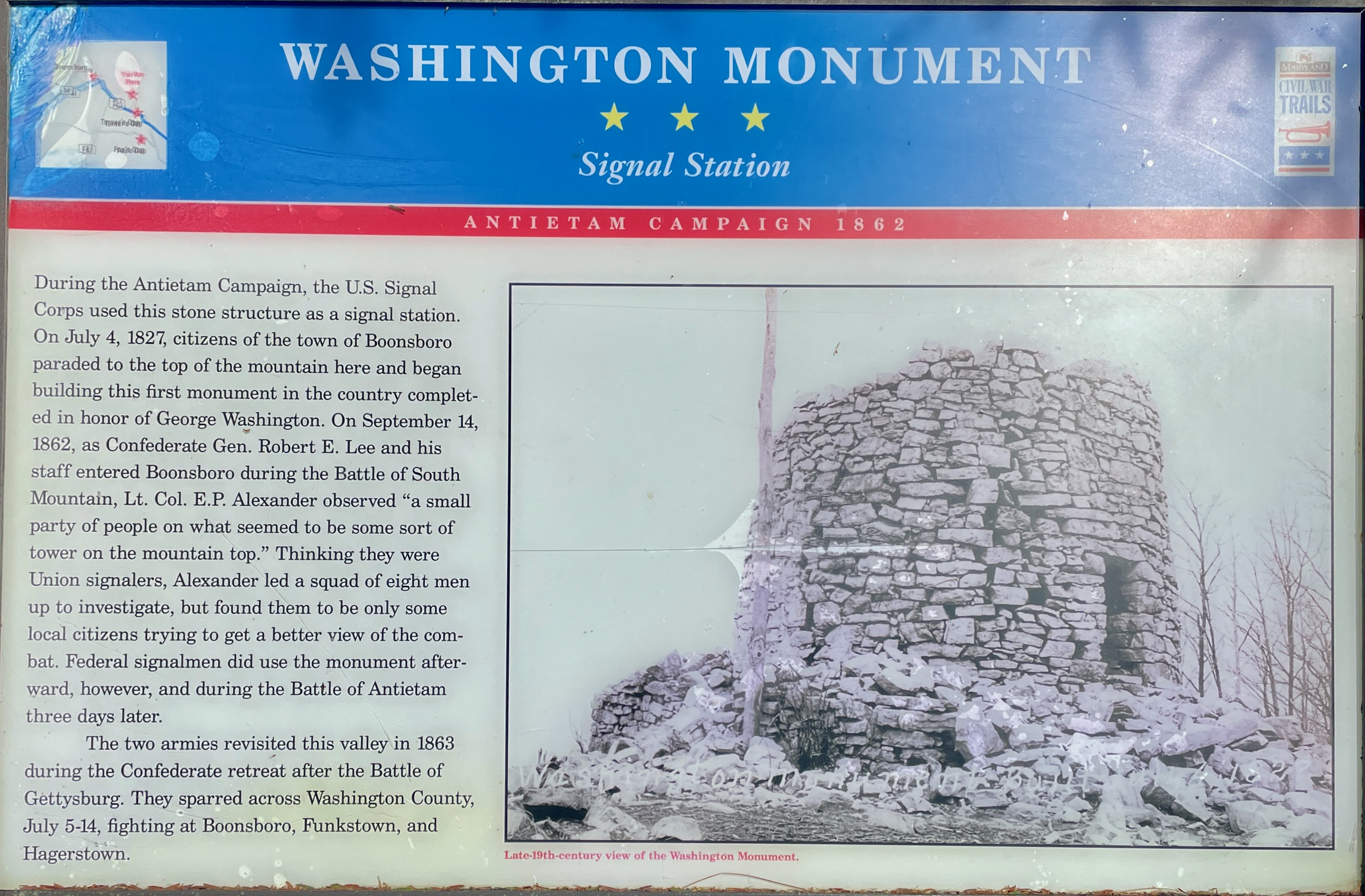
Washington Monument used as signal station during the Battle of South Mountain

Built in 1827, the original tower was the first monument dedicated to George Washington to be completed. The Washington Monument in Baltimore was completed two years later, although it had been started considerably earlier in 1815. The famous Washington Monument in the District of Columbia was not completed until 1885.

The dry-laid stone tower was built on July 4, 1827, by the citizens of Boonsboro who marched to the site en masse after assembling in the town square at 7 a.m. At the end of that day, the tower stood at 15 feet (4.6 m) high on a base 54 feet (16 m) in circumference. Later that year, "after the busy season", workmen returned to complete the tower to a height of 30 feet (9.1 m).

Owen Brown was the son of Abolitionist John Brown and the highest ranking surviving, uncaptured member of the party assembled for John Brown's Raid on Harpers Ferry. Owen led a party of five escapees from the failed raid to safety in the north. On or about the night of October 23, 1859 these men ascended the slope of South Mountain after circling around Turner's Gap to avoid the men and dogs lying in wait for them in the mountain pass. To their astonishment, there on the crest of the mountain was an odd stone tower. Owen Brown retold the experience during his only known interview in 1873, both he and the interviewer then still apparently unaware the men had stumbled upon Washington's Monument.

Although it was a popular meeting place for the citizenry of Boonsboro, weather and vandalism reduced the monument to rubble. In that condition, it was used by the Union Army as a signal station during the Civil War.

=== First restoration ===
In 1882, the Odd Fellows Lodge of Boonsboro sponsored the tower's restoration. A canopy was added and a vehicle road built up the mountainside. A decade later, however, the tower again fell into ruin when a crack in the wall was not repaired.

=== State park ===
The Washington County Historical Society purchased the one-acre (0.40 ha) site in 1920 and deeded it to the state for use as a state park in 1934.

=== CCC restoration ===
The tower was rebuilt in its present form by members of the Civilian Conservation Corps. Workers set in place the original cornerstone and a facsimile of the dedication tablet (pictured at right), and a third dedication ceremony was held on July 4, 1936.

== Activities and amenities ==
The park offers access to the Appalachian Trail, picnicking facilities, and a museum with exhibits on the natural and cultural history of the area.

== See also ==
- Memorials dedicated to George Washington
- Presidential memorials in the United States
