= Stony Run Creek =

Stream in Yellow Medicine County, Minnesota, U.S.

Coordinates: 44°52′02″N 95°37′32″W

Stony Run Creek is a stream in Yellow Medicine County, in the U.S. state of Minnesota.

Stony Run Creek was named for the boulders resting along its course.

== See also ==
- List of rivers of Minnesota
