= Boonsboro, Maryland =

- Town
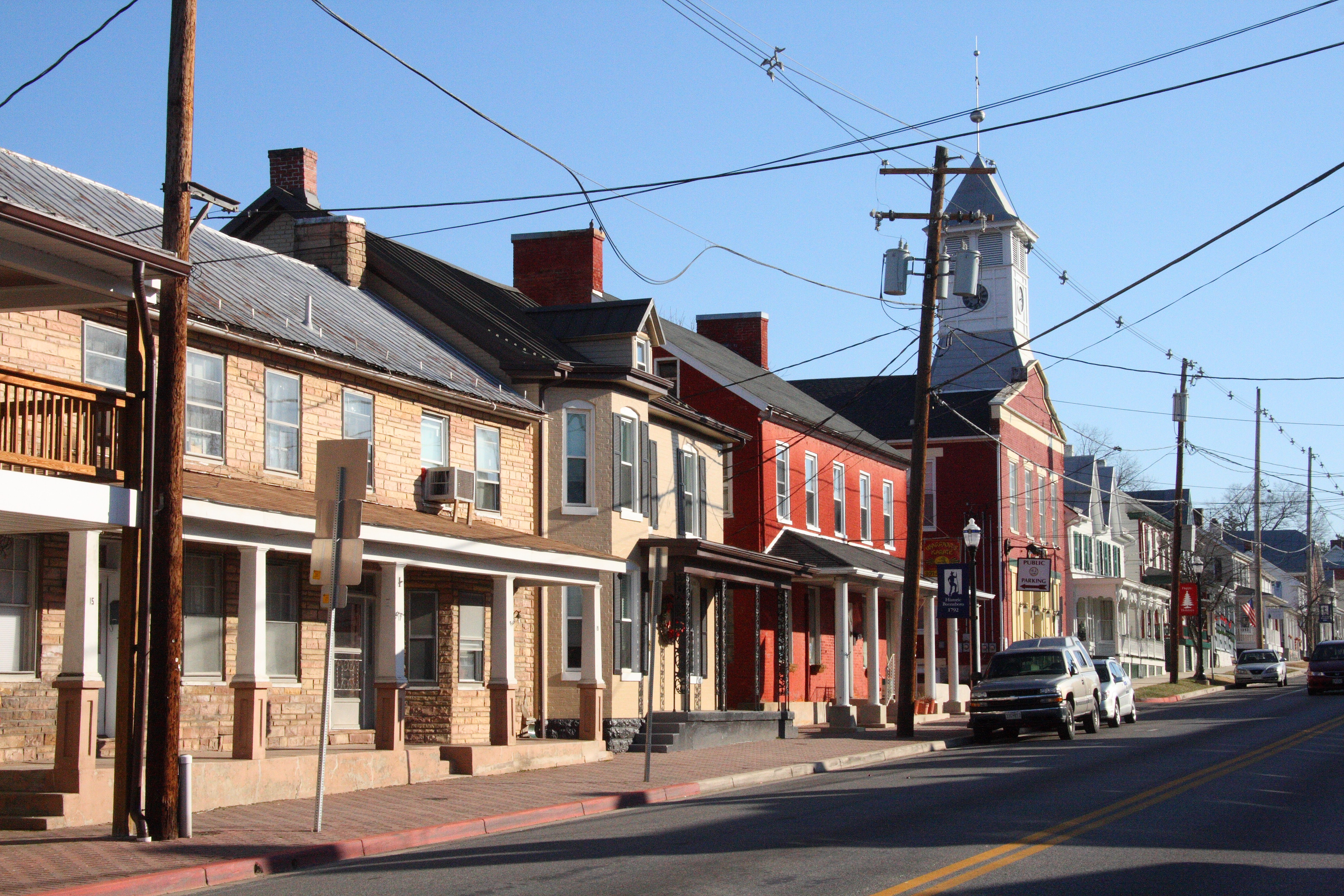
- Downtown Boonsboro

- Flag Seal

- Location of Boonsboro in Maryland
- Coordinates: 39°30′30″N 77°39′14″W
- Country: United States
- State: Maryland
- County: Washington
- Founded: 1792
- Incorporated: 1831

Area
  - Town: 3.06 sq mi (7.92 km^{2})
  - Land: 3.05 sq mi (7.91 km^{2})
  - Water: 0.0039 sq mi (0.01 km^{2}) 0.34%
  - Urban: 1.32 sq mi (3.43 km^{2})
- Elevation: 505 ft (154 m)

Population (2020)
  - Town: 3,799
  - Density: 1,244.4/sq mi (480.46/km^{2})
- Time zone: UTC-5 (Eastern)
  - Summer (DST): UTC-4 (Eastern)
- ZIP code: 21713
- Area codes: 301 and 240
- FIPS code: 24-08625
- GNIS feature ID: 2390740
- Website: www.town.boonsboro.md.us

Boonsboro is a town in Washington County, Maryland, United States, located at the foot of South Mountain. It nearly borders Frederick County and is proximate to the Antietam National Battlefield. The population was 3,779 at the 2020 census.

== History ==
Local lore asserts Boonsboro was founded by George Boone, a cousin of Daniel Boone, and was originally named "Margaretsville" after his wife, Margaret. The town was incorporated as Boonesborough in 1831. Local newspapers and villagers preferred the name Boonsboro. The former name was used on some documents as late as 1903.

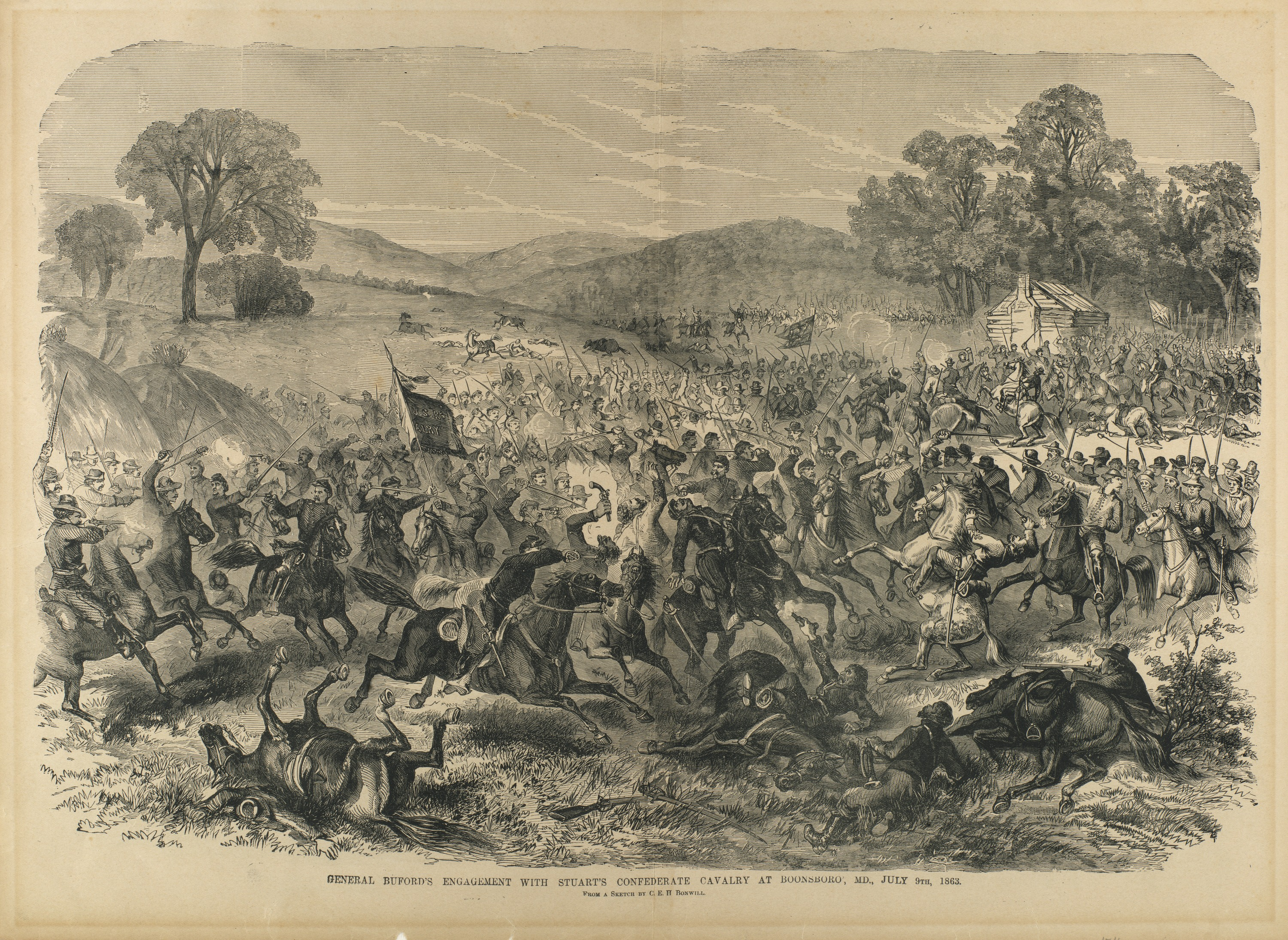
General Buford's Engagement with Stuart's Confederate Cavalry at Boonsboro, MD. July 9, 1863

Boonsboro was a key town during the American Civil War. Two battles were fought in its present borders. The town was also used to keep wounded soldiers after the Battle of Antietam in September 1862. Southeast of the town was the site of the Battle of South Mountain.

Boonsboro lies on what used to be the National Road. Today it is known as either the Old National Pike or Alt-U.S. 40. In Boonsboro, it is Main Street. The route was originally established as a road improvement project in 1758 to shorten travel between Fredericktown and Fort Frederick during the Seven Years' War. The route began from the existing (old) road at today's Marker road, passed through Turner's Gap, Boonsboro and turned west along today's MD. Rt. 68 to Williamsport. The route from Boonsboro to Funkstown was later adopted as part of the National Turnpike route.

The town suffered a fire at the former Asaro's (its successor Vesta moved to the building across) in 2007, and another fire at the former inn in 2008. That fire completely gutted the inn, which was on the verge of being renovated and reopened. The Inn BoonsBoro finally opened a year later; it is owned by best-selling romance novelist Nora Roberts.

Recently, Boonsboro gained national attention as a literary and tourist destination due to the influence of the novelist. Apart from owning the inn, Nora Roberts has also revitalized several businesses in town such as a gift shop and a bookstore, establishing attention from fans and visitors across the country.

The Boonsboro Historic District, Bowman House, Ingram-Schipper Farm, Keedy House, St. Mark's Episcopal Church, and Washington Monument are listed on the National Register of Historic Places.

== Geography ==
According to the United States Census Bureau, the town has a total area of 2.91 square miles (7.54 km^{2}), of which 2.90 square miles (7.51 km^{2}) is land and 0.01 square miles (0.03 km^{2}) is water.

Boonsboro is the starting point for the JFK 50 Mile race held every year in November.

== Demographics ==
Historical population
| Census | Pop. | Note | %± |
|---|---|---|---|
| 1850 | 943 | | — |
| 1860 | 864 | | −8.4% |
| 1870 | 835 | | −3.4% |
| 1880 | 859 | | 2.9% |
| 1890 | 766 | | −10.8% |
| 1900 | 700 | | −8.6% |
| 1910 | 759 | | 8.4% |
| 1920 | 350 | | −53.9% |
| 1930 | 369 | | 5.4% |
| 1940 | 938 | | 154.2% |
| 1950 | 1,071 | | 14.2% |
| 1960 | 1,211 | | 13.1% |
| 1970 | 1,410 | | 16.4% |
| 1980 | 1,908 | | 35.3% |
| 1990 | 2,445 | | 28.1% |
| 2000 | 2,803 | | 14.6% |
| 2010 | 3,336 | | 19.0% |
| 2020 | 3,799 | | 13.9% |
U.S. Decennial Census

=== 2020 census ===
As of the 2020 census, Boonsboro had a population of 3,799. The median age was 39.2 years. 24.8% of residents were under the age of 18 and 16.8% of residents were 65 years of age or older. For every 100 females there were 89.7 males, and for every 100 females age 18 and over there were 88.0 males age 18 and over.

0.0% of residents lived in urban areas, while 100.0% lived in rural areas.

There were 1,386 households in Boonsboro, of which 37.7% had children under the age of 18 living in them. Of all households, 52.6% were married-couple households, 14.6% were households with a male householder and no spouse or partner present, and 25.9% were households with a female householder and no spouse or partner present. About 22.5% of all households were made up of individuals and 10.7% had someone living alone who was 65 years of age or older.

There were 1,463 housing units, of which 5.3% were vacant. The homeowner vacancy rate was 1.4% and the rental vacancy rate was 8.1%.

Racial composition as of the 2020 census
| Race | Number | Percent |
|---|---|---|
| White | 3,311 | 87.2% |
| Black or African American | 121 | 3.2% |
| American Indian and Alaska Native | 7 | 0.2% |
| Asian | 44 | 1.2% |
| Native Hawaiian and Other Pacific Islander | 2 | 0.1% |
| Some other race | 55 | 1.4% |
| Two or more races | 259 | 6.8% |
| Hispanic or Latino (of any race) | 179 | 4.7% |

=== 2010 census ===
As of the census of 2010, there were 3,336 people, 1,237 households, and 879 families residing in the town. The population density was 1,150.3 inhabitants per square mile (444.1/km^{2}). There were 1,327 housing units at an average density of 457.6 per square mile (176.7/km^{2}). The racial makeup of the town was 95.4% White, 2.1% African American, 0.1% Native American, 1.0% Asian, 0.1% Pacific Islander, 0.5% from other races, and 0.7% from two or more races. Hispanic or Latino of any race were 2.7% of the population.

There were 1,237 households, of which 37.3% had children under the age of 18 living with them, 55.8% were married couples living together, 10.4% had a female householder with no husband present, 4.9% had a male householder with no wife present, and 28.9% were non-families. 24.3% of all households were made up of individuals, and 10.5% had someone living alone who was 65 years of age or older. The average household size was 2.58 and the average family size was 3.06.

The median age in the town was 40.8 years. 24.3% of residents were under the age of 18; 6.7% were between the ages of 18 and 24; 26.1% were from 25 to 44; 26.6% were from 45 to 64; and 16.2% were 65 years of age or older. The gender makeup of the town was 46.6% male and 53.4% female.

=== 2000 census ===
As of the census of 2000, there were 2,803 people, 1,068 households, and 723 families residing in the town. The population density was 1,851.0 inhabitants per square mile (714.7/km^{2}). There were 1,109 housing units at an average density of 732.3 per square mile (282.7/km^{2}). The racial makeup of the town was 98.04% White, 0.75% African American, 0.11% Native American, 0.18% Asian, 0.04% Pacific Islander, 0.14% from other races, and 0.75% from two or more races. Hispanic or Latino of any race were 0.75% of the population.

There were 1,068 households, out of which 34.5% had children under the age of 18 living with them, 52.2% were married couples living together, 11.8% had a female householder with no husband present, and 32.3% were non-families. 27.2% of all households were made up of individuals, and 15.4% had someone living alone who was 65 years of age or older. The average household size was 2.47 and the average family size was 3.04.

In the town, the population was spread out, with 25.5% under the age of 18, 5.9% from 18 to 24, 28.4% from 25 to 44, 20.3% from 45 to 64, and 19.9% who were 65 years of age or older. The median age was 40 years. For every 100 females, there were 85.3 males. For every 100 females age 18 and over, there were 76.5 males.

The median income for a household in the town was $40,476, and the median income for a family was $48,155. Males had a median income of $37,683 versus $25,673 for females. The per capita income for the town was $19,430. About 7.8% of families and 7.9% of the population were below the poverty line, including 6.4% of those under age 18 and 14.1% of those age 65 or over.

== Government ==
Boonsboro has a seven-member Town Council, which serves as the legislative body of the Town. In Boonsboro, from 1831 through 1939, Mayors (originally called Burgesses) were elected annually. From 1940 through 1975, they served two-year terms. Since 1976, Mayors have been chosen for four-year terms, except for the previous mayor, who had been in office from 1988 through 2016.

Boonsboro's current mayor is Howard W. Long.

Previous Mayors include:

- 1831–1835 Jonathan Shafer
- 1835–1836 David Brookhart
- 1836–1837 Lewis Fletcher
- 1837–1838 Joseph O'neal
- 1838–1839 Anthony McBride
- 1839–1840 Joseph Knox
- 1840–1841 Charles Perry
- 1841–1843 Jacob Smith
- 1843–1845 James Chambers
- 1845–1846 Andrew Newcomer
- 1846–1847 Lewis Fletcher
- 1847–1848 James Chambers
- 1848–1850 David Gilbert
- 1850–1851 David H. Keedy
- 1851–1852 J. C. Brining
- 1852–1853 William H. Miller
- 1853–1854 P. B. Stuffing
- 1854–1855 J. C. Brining
- 1855–1856 John Stonesifer
- 1856–1857 Lauton Miller
- 1857–1859 James Chambers
- 1859–1862 Joseph O'helper
- 1862–1864 James Chambers
- 1864–1865 George Numan
- 1865–1867 Josiah Knodle
- 1867–1868 Jacob Blecman
- 1868–1869 David Schlosser
- 1869–1872 John H. Smith
- 1872–1874 Anslem Watery
- 1874–1876 Elias Cost
- 1876–1877 George Hoffmeister
- 1877–1880 William Welck
- 1880–1881 Thomas E. Smith
- 1881–1882 John Murdock
- 1882–1883 George Nyman
- 1883–1885 John H. Lakin
- 1885–1886 John C. Brining
- 1886–1887 William E. Itnyre
- 1887–1888 A. M. V. B. Deaner
- 1888–1889 Frank Smith
- 1889–1891 John R. Fletcher
- 1891–1892 John E. Smith
- 1892–1893 Matthew O'Brn
- 1893–1894 M. L. Storm
- 1894–1895 Eli Wade
- 1895–1897 James P. Ford
- 1897–1898 Frank E. Newcomer
- 1898–1899 William L. Irwin
- 1899–1901 John R. Fletcher
- 1901–1902 O. J. Stotlemyer
- 1902–1904 Elias E. Martz
- 1904–1905 C. C. Ford
- 1905–1906 George M. Stover
- 1906–1909 G. J. Roudabush
- 1909–1910 Elias E. Martz
- 1910–1911 G. J. Roudabush
- 1911–1912 H. G. Routzahn
- 1912–1916 G. J. Roudabush
- 1916–1917 George M. Stover
- 1917–1919 J. L. Danner
- 1919–1920 H. P. Lynch
- 1920–1921 Harvey J. Huffer
- 1921–1925 George McBride
- 1925–1926 Oscar Morgan
- 1926–1929 George McBride
- 1929–1934 H. S. Bomberger
- 1934–1935 Alfred C. Huffer
- 1935–1938 D. Frank Miller
- 1938–1940 John Hershberger
- 1940–1942 John Hershberger
- 1942–1960 John B. Wheeler
- 1960–1970 John L. Herr
- 1970–1974 Kenneth E. Ramsburg
- 1974–1976 Edward T. Weaver
- 1976–1980 Stuart L. Mullendore
- 1980–1988 John L. Herr
- 1988–2016 Charles F. (Skip) Kauffman, Jr.
- 2016–Present Howard W. Long

== Education ==
Boonsboro is served by a 90-acre (360,000 m^{2}) educational complex. It consists of the following schools:

- Boonsboro Elementary School
- Boonsboro Middle School
- Boonsboro High School

== Transportation ==
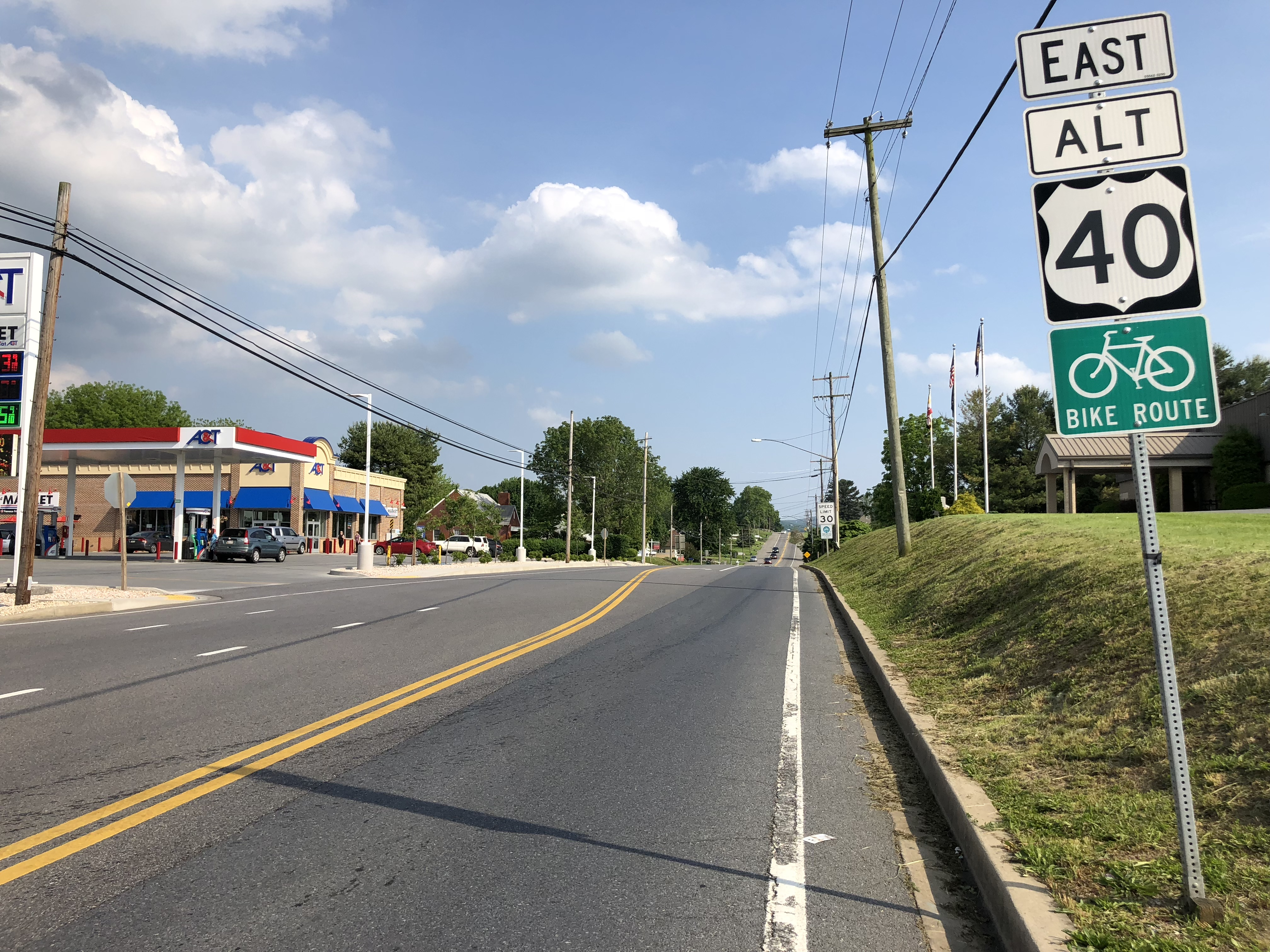
US 40 Alternate entering Boonsboro

The primary means of travel to and from Boonsboro is by road. Five main highways serve the town, with the most prominent of these being U.S. Route 40 Alternate. US 40 Alt follows Main Street through central Boonsboro, linking westward to Hagerstown and eastward to Frederick. In addition to US 40 Alt, Maryland Route 34 connects Boonsboro to Sharpsburg and across the Potomac River into Shepherdstown, WV. Maryland Route 66 connects the town to Interstate 70 and further north to Smithsburg. Maryland Route 67 connects it to U.S. Route 340, and Maryland Route 68 links to Interstate 81 and Williamsport.

== Notable people ==
- Janet Doub Erickson, co-founder of the Blockhouse of Boston, artist and educator (born in Hagerstown Hospital to a Boonsboro farming family, she spent her childhood there).
- William Thomas Hamilton, 38th Governor of Maryland, U.S. Senator, & U.S. Congressman for Maryland's 2nd District and 4th District. Born in Boonsboro on 8 September 1820.
- Edwin R. Keedy (1880–1958), Dean of the University of Pennsylvania Law School
- Nora Roberts, author of over 170 romantic novels and entrepreneur of several businesses in Boonsboro.
- The late Charlotte Winters, 109, once the oldest surviving female American World War I veteran. Served in the navy.

== Area attractions ==
- Boonsboro Trolley Museum
- Boonesborough Museum of History
- National Road Museum
- Bowman House
- Crystal Grottoes
- Greenbrier State Park
- South Mountain State Battlefield
- Stoney Creek Farm
- Washington Monument State Park
