= List of census-designated places in Maryland =

This article lists the census-designated places (CDPs) in the state of Maryland, their population, and the counties they reside in. The only county which does not contain a CDP is Cecil County.

== Census-designated places ==
† County seat

CDP	Population (2020)	County
Aberdeen Proving Ground	1,668	Harford
Abingdon	4,826	Harford
Accokeek	13,927	Prince George's
Adamstown	2,331	Frederick
Adelphi	16,823	Prince George's
Algonquin	1,220	Dorchester
Allen	199	Wicomico
Andrews AFB	3,025	Prince George's
Annapolis Neck	10,973	Anne Arundel
Antietam	98	Washington
Aquasco	913	Prince George's
Arbutus	21,655	Baltimore
Arden on the Severn	1,881	Anne Arundel
Arnold	24,064	Anne Arundel
Ashton-Sandy Spring	5,746	Montgomery
Aspen Hill	51,063	Montgomery
Baden	2,114	Prince George's
Bagtown	321	Washington
Bakersville	30	Washington
Ballenger Creek	24,999	Frederick
Baltimore Highlands	7,740	Baltimore
Barrelville	58	Allegany
Bartonsville	2,753	Frederick
Beaver Creek	461	Washington
Bel Air	1,504	Allegany
Bel Air North	31,841	Harford
Bel Air South	57,648	Harford
Beltsville	20,133	Prince George's
Benedict	232	Charles
Bensville	15,288	Charles
Bethesda	68,056	Montgomery
Bier	186	Allegany
Big Pool	78	Washington
Big Spring	85	Washington
Bishopville	499	Worcester
Bivalve	185	Wicomico
Bloomington	271	Garrett
Bowleys Quarters	6,853	Baltimore
Bowling Green	1,018	Allegany
Bowmans Addition	584	Allegany
Braddock Heights	3,075	Frederick
Brandywine	10,550	Prince George's
Breathedsville	255	Washington
Brock Hall	13,181	Prince George's
Brooklyn Park	16,112	Anne Arundel
Brookmont	3,751	Montgomery
Broomes Island	379	Calvert
Brown Station	3,298	Prince George's
Brownsville	102	Washington
Bryans Road	8,650	Charles
Bryantown	653	Charles
Buckeystown	1,072	Frederick
Burnt Mills	3,592	Montgomery
Burtonsville	9,498	Montgomery
Butlertown	520	Kent
Cabin John	2,459	Montgomery
California	12,947	St. Mary's
Callaway	1,779	St. Mary's
Calvert Beach	791	Calvert
Calverton	17,316	Montgomery and Prince George's
Camp Springs	22,734	Prince George's
Cape St. Claire	9,179	Anne Arundel
Carlos	144	Allegany
Carney	29,363	Baltimore
Catonsville	44,701	Baltimore
Cavetown	1,446	Washington
Cearfoss	146	Washington
Cedar Heights	1,597	Prince George's
Cedarville	639	Prince George's
Chance	330	Somerset
Charlotte Hall	1,388	Charles and St. Mary's
Charlton	166	Washington
Chespeake Landing	472	Kent
Chesapeake Ranch Estates	10,308	Calvert
Chester	5,003	Queen Anne's
Chevy Chase	10,176	Montgomery
Chewsville	261	Washington
Chillum	36,039	Prince George's
Choptank	126	Caroline
Clarksburg	29,051	Montgomery
Clarysville	67	Allegany
Clinton	38,760	Prince George's
Cloverly	15,285	Montgomery
Cobb Island	929	Charles
Cockeysville	24,184	Baltimore
Colesville	15,421	Montgomery
Columbia	104,681	Howard
Coral Hills	9,997	Prince George's
Cordova	551	Talbot
Corriganville	421	Allegany
Crellin	210	Garrett
Cresaptown	5,442	Allegany
Crofton	29,641	Anne Arundel
Croom	2,720	Prince George's
Crownsville	1,924	Anne Arundel
Crumpton	496	Queen Anne's
Damascus	17,224	Montgomery
Dames Quarter	142	Somerset
Danville	224	Allegany
Dargan	163	Washington
Darlington	398	Harford
Darnestown	6,723	Montgomery
Dawson	100	Allegany
Deal Island	375	Somerset
Deale	4,943	Anne Arundel
Derwood	2,535	Montgomery
Detmold	66	Allegany
Downsville	341	Washington
Drum Point	2,553	Calvert
Dundalk	67,796	Baltimore
Dunkirk	2,431	Calvert
Eakles Mill	26	Washington
East Riverdale	18,459	Prince George's
Eckhart Mines	858	Allegany
Eden	803	Somerset
Edesville	169	Kent
Edgemere	9,069	Baltimore
Edgemont	218	Washington
Edgewater	9,446	Anne Arundel
Edgewood	25,713	Harford
Eldersburg	32,582	Carroll
Elkridge	25,171	Howard
Ellerslie	651	Allegany
Ellicott City†	75,947	Howard
Elliott	43	Dorchester
Ernstville	58	Washington
Essex	40,505	Baltimore
Fairland	25,396	Montgomery
Fairlee	500	Kent
Fairmount	408	Somerset
Fairplay	537	Washington
Fairview	76	Washington
Fairwood	7,983	Prince George's
Fallston	9,306	Harford
Ferndale	17,091	Anne Arundel
Finzel	495	Garrett
Fishing Creek	173	Dorchester
Flintstone	167	Allegany
Flower Hill	14,108	Montgomery
Forest Glen	6,897	Montgomery
Forestville	12,831	Prince George's
Fort Meade	9,324	Anne Arundel
Fort Ritchie	12	Washington
Fort Washington	24,261	Prince George's
Fountainhead-Orchard Hills	6,189	Washington
Four Corners	8,316	Montgomery
Franklin	253	Allegany
Frenchtown-Rumbly	86	Somerset
Friendly	9,937	Prince George's
Friendship	384	Anne Arundel
Friendship Heights Village	5,360	Montgomery
Fulton	5,916	Howard
Galesville	623	Anne Arundel
Gambrills	3,034	Anne Arundel
Gapland	109	Washington
Garretts Mill	228	Washington
Garrison	9,487	Baltimore
Georgetown	117	Kent
Germantown	91,249	Montgomery
Gilmore	132	Allegany
Girdletree	141	Worcester
Glassmanor	18,430	Prince George's
Glen Burnie	72,891	Anne Arundel
Glenmont	16,710	Montgomery
Glenn Dale	14,698	Prince George's
Golden Beach	3,651	St. Mary's
Gorman	85	Garrett
Graceham	243	Frederick
Grahamtown	368	Allegany
Grasonville	3,474	Queen Anne's
Greensburg	236	Washington
Green Valley	12,643	Frederick
Halfway	11,896	Washington
Hampton	5,180	Baltimore
Herald Harbor	2,869	Anne Arundel
Highfield-Cascade	1,082	Washington
Highland	1,133	Howard
Hillandale	5,774	Montgomery and Prince George's
Hillcrest Heights	15,793	Prince George's
Honeygo	12,927	Baltimore
Hughesville	2,438	Charles
Huntingtown	3,545	Calvert
Hutton	87	Garrett
Ilchester	26,824	Howard
Indian Springs	68	Washington
Jarrettsville	2,888	Harford
Jefferson	2,697	Frederick
Jennings	99	Garrett
Jessup	10,535	Anne Arundel and Howard
Jesterville	179	Wicomico
Joppatowne	13,425	Harford
Jugtown	168	Washington
Kemp Mill	13,378	Montgomery
Kemps Mill	117	Washington
Kennedyville	230	Kent
Kent Narrows	612	Queen Anne's
Kettering	14,424	Prince George's
Kingstown	1,689	Queen Anne's
Kingsville	4,358	Baltimore
Klondike	103	Allegany
Konterra	3,158	Prince George's
Lake Arbor	14,541	Prince George's
Lake Shore	19,551	Anne Arundel
Landover	25,998	Prince George's
Langley Park	20,126	Prince George's
Lanham	11,282	Prince George's
Lansdowne	9,004	Baltimore
Largo	11,605	Prince George's
La Vale	4,201	Allegany
Layhill	5,764	Montgomery
Leisure World	9,215	Montgomery
Leitersburg	569	Washington
Lewistown	458	Frederick
Lexington Park	13,317	St. Mary's
Libertytown	984	Frederick
Linganore	12,351	Frederick
Linthicum	11,190	Anne Arundel
Lisbon	282	Howard
Little Orleans	65	Allegany
Lochearn	25,511	Baltimore
Long Beach	1,739	Calvert
Lusby	2,072	Calvert
Lutherville	6,835	Baltimore
McCoole	449	Allegany
Madison	205	Dorchester
Mapleville	243	Washington
Marlboro Meadows	3,655	Prince George's
Marlboro Village	9,221	Prince George's
Marlow Heights	6,169	Prince George's
Marlton	9,802	Prince George's
Maryland City	19,153	Anne Arundel
Maryland Park	965	Prince George's
Maugansville	3,669	Washington
Mayo	8,832	Anne Arundel
Mays Chapel	12,224	Baltimore
Mechanicsville	1,673	St. Mary's
Melwood	3,977	Prince George's
Mercersville	91	Washington
Middleburg	73	Washington
Middle River	33,203	Baltimore
Midlothian	352	Allegany
Milford Mill	30,622	Baltimore
Mitchellville	11,136	Prince George's
Monrovia	2,702	Frederick
Montgomery Village	34,893	Montgomery
Moscow	219	Allegany
Mount Aetna	580	Washington
Mount Briar	170	Washington
Mount Lena	547	Washington
Mount Savage	733	Allegany
Mount Vernon	761	Somerset
Nanticoke	209	Wicomico
Nanticoke Acres	120	Wicomico
National	52	Allegany
National Harbor	5,509	Prince George's
Naval Academy	485	Anne Arundel
Newark	401	Worcester
Nikep	95	Allegany
North Bethesda	50,094	Montgomery
North Kensington	9,497	Montgomery
North Laurel	25,379	Howard
North Potomac	23,790	Montgomery
Ocean	33	Allegany
Ocean Pines	12,145	Worcester
Odenton	42,947	Anne Arundel
Oldtown	116	Allegany
Olney	35,820	Montgomery
Overlea	12,832	Baltimore
Owings	2,141	Calvert
Owings Mills	35,674	Baltimore
Oxon Hill	18,791	Prince George's
Paramount-Long Meadow	2,658	Washington
Parkville	31,812	Baltimore
Parole	17,877	Anne Arundel
Parsonsburg	319	Wicomico
Pasadena	32,979	Anne Arundel
Pecktonville	164	Washington
Peppermill Village	5,264	Prince George's
Perry Hall	29,409	Baltimore
Perryman	2,496	Harford
Pikesville	34,168	Baltimore
Pinesburg	444	Washington
Piney Point	980	St. Mary's
Pleasant Grove	330	Allegany
Pleasant Hills	3,998	Harford
Point of Rocks	1,886	Frederick
Pomfret	514	Charles
Pondsville	139	Washington
Potomac	47,018	Montgomery
Potomac Heights	1,036	Charles
Potomac Park	1,036	Allegany
Powellville	188	Wicomico
Prince Frederick†	3,226	Calvert
Pylesville	711	Harford
Quantico	148	Wicomico
Queen Anne	1,405	Prince George's
Queensland	2,191	Prince George's
Randallstown	33,655	Baltimore
Rawlings	687	Allegany
Redland	18,592	Montgomery
Reid	64	Washington
Reisterstown	26,822	Baltimore
Ringgold	166	Washington
Riva	4,257	Anne Arundel
Riverside	7,021	Harford
Riviera Beach	12,384	Anne Arundel
Robinwood	7,397	Washington
Rock Point	82	Charles
Rohrersville	175	Washington
Romancoke	1,855	Queen Anne's
Rosaryville	11,548	Prince George's
Rosedale	19,961	Baltimore
Rossville	16,029	Baltimore
Sabillasville	470	Frederick
St. George Island	265	St. Mary's
St. James	4,757	Washington
St. Leonard	778	Calvert
Sandy Hook	168	Washington
San Mar	366	Washington
Savage	7,542	Howard
Scaggsville	9,217	Howard
Seabrook	19,627	Prince George's
Severn	57,118	Anne Arundel
Severna Park	39,933	Anne Arundel
Shady Side	5,806	Anne Arundel
Shaft	208	Allegany
Silver Hill	6,381	Prince George's
Silver Spring	81,015	Montgomery
Smith Island	202	Somerset
Solomons	2,650	Calvert
South Kensington	8,829	Montgomery
South Laurel	29,602	Prince George's
Spencerville	1,812	Montgomery
Spring Gap	52	Allegany
Spring Ridge	6,005	Frederick
Springdale	5,301	Prince George's
Stevensville	7,442	Queen Anne's
Still Pond	131	Kent
Stockton	91	Worcester
Suitland	25,839	Prince George's
Summerfield	14,758	Prince George's
Swanton	66	Garrett
Tall Timbers	451	St. Mary's
Taylors Island	125	Dorchester
Temple Hills	8,350	Prince George's
Ten Mile Creek	1,012	Montgomery
Tilghman Island	807	Talbot
Tilghmanton	423	Washington
Timonium	10,458	Baltimore
Tolchester	297	Kent
Towson†	59,553	Baltimore
Travilah	11,985	Montgomery
Trego-Rohrersville Station	160	Washington
Tyaskin	226	Wicomico
Urbana	13,304	Frederick
Vale Summit	111	Allegany
Waldorf	81,410	Charles
Walker Mill	12,187	Prince George's
Waterview	32	Wicomico
West Denton	46	Caroline
West Laurel	4,428	Prince George's
West Ocean City	4,952	Worcester
West Pocomoke	481	Somerset
Westphalia	11,770	Prince George's
Whaleyville	192	Worcester
Wheaton	52,510	Montgomery
White Marsh	10,287	Baltimore
White Oak	16,347	Montgomery
Whitehaven	46	Wicomico
Wildewood	7,821	St. Mary's
Williston	153	Caroline
Wilson-Conococheague	2,262	Washington
Woodland	91	Allegany
Woodlawn	39,986	Baltimore
Woodlawn	7,541	Prince George's
Woodmore	4,513	Prince George's
Worton	214	Kent
Yarrowsburg	112	Washington
Zihlman	331	Allegany

== See also ==
- Maryland
- List of municipalities in Maryland
