= List of cities in the Baltimore–Washington metropolitan area =

This is a list of cities and municipalities in the Baltimore–Washington metropolitan area.

== Central cities ==
- Baltimore (Major airport: adjacent to Baltimore–Washington International Thurgood Marshall Airport, in Anne Arundel County)
- Washington, DC
- Frederick, Maryland
- Annapolis, Maryland
- Hagerstown, Maryland

== Suburbs with more than 100,000 inhabitants ==
=== Maryland ===
- Columbia

=== Virginia ===
- Alexandria
- Arlington (Major airport: Ronald Reagan Washington National Airport, Recognized as a "central city" by the U.S. Census Bureau)

== Suburbs with 10,000 to 100,000 inhabitants ==
=== Maryland ===
- Aberdeen
- Accokeek
- Adelphi
- Annapolis Neck
- Arbutus
- Arnold
- Aspen Hill
- Ballenger Creek
- Bel Air
- Bel Air North
- Bel Air South
- Beltsville
- Bensville
- Bethesda
- Bowie
- Brooklyn Park
- California
- Calverton
- Camp Springs
- Carney
- Catonsville
- Chesapeake Ranch Estates
- Chevy Chase
- Chillum
- Clarksburg
- Clinton
- Cloverly
- Cockeysville
- Colesville
- College Park
- Crofton
- Damascus
- Dundalk
- East Riverdale
- Edgewood
- Eldersburg
- Elkridge
- Ellicott City
- Essex
- Fairland
- Ferndale
- Forestville
- Fort Washington
- Gaithersburg
- Germantown
- Glassmanor
- Glen Burnie
- Glenmont
- Glenn Dale
- Greenbelt
- Hagerstown
- Halfway
- Havre de Grace
- Hillcrest Heights
- Hyattsville
- Ilchester
- Joppatowne
- Kemp Mill
- Kettering
- Lake Shore
- Landover
- Langley Park
- Lanham
- Largo
- Laurel
- Lexington Park
- Linthicum
- Lochearn
- Maryland City
- Mays Chapel
- Middle River
- Milford Mill
- Mitchellville
- Montgomery Village
- New Carrollton
- North Bethesda
- North Potomac
- Odenton
- Olney
- Overlea
- Owings Mills
- Oxon Hill
- Parkville
- Parole
- Pasadena
- Perry Hall
- Pikesville
- Potomac
- Randallstown
- Redland
- Reisterstown
- Riviera Beach
- Rockville
- Rosaryville
- Rosedale
- Rossville
- Scaggsville
- Seabrook
- Severn
- Severna Park
- Silver Spring
- South Laurel
- Suitland
- Summerfield
- Takoma Park
- Towson
- Travilah
- Waldorf
- Walker Mill
- Westminster
- Wheaton
- White Oak
- Woodlawn, Baltimore County

=== Virginia ===
- Annandale
- Ashburn
- Bailey's Crossroads
- Broadlands
- Buckhall
- Bull Run
- Burke
- Burke Centre
- Cascades
- Centreville
- Chantilly (major airport: Washington Dulles International Airport)
- Cherry Hill
- Countryside
- Culpeper
- Dale City
- Dranesville
- Fairfax
- Fairfax Station
- Fair Oaks, Fairfax County
- Falls Church
- Fort Hunt
- Franconia
- Franklin Farm
- Fredericksburg (acts as a central city)
- Front Royal
- Gainesville
- Great Falls
- Groveton
- Herndon
- Huntington
- Hybla Valley
- Idylwood
- Kings Park West
- Kingstowne
- Lake Ridge
- Lansdowne
- Leesburg
- Lincolnia
- Linton Hall
- Lorton
- Lowes Island
- Manassas
- Manassas Park
- Marumsco
- McLean
- McNair
- Merrifield
- Montclair
- Mount Vernon
- Neabsco
- Newington
- Newington Forest
- Oakton
- Reston
- Rose Hill
- South Riding
- Springfield
- Sterling
- Sudley
- Sugarland Run
- Tysons Corner
- Vienna
- Wakefield, Fairfax County
- West Falls Church
- West Springfield
- Wolf Trap
- Woodlawn, Fairfax County

=== West Virginia ===
- Martinsburg

== Suburbs with fewer than 10,000 inhabitants ==
=== Maryland ===
- Aberdeen Proving Ground
- Adamstown
- Andrews AFB
- Antietam
- Aquasco
- Arden on the Severn
- Ashton-Sandy Spring
- Baden
- Bagtown
- Bakersville
- Baltimore Highlands
- Barclay
- Barnesville
- Bartonsville
- Beaver Creek
- Benedict
- Berwyn Heights
- Big Pool
- Big Spring
- Bladensburg
- Boonsboro
- Bowleys Quarters
- Braddock Heights
- Brandywine
- Breathedsville
- Brentwood
- Brock Hall
- Brookeville
- Brookmont
- Broomes Island
- Brownsville
- Brunswick
- Bryans Road
- Bryantown
- Buckeystown
- Burkittsville
- Burtonsville
- Cabin John
- Calvert Beach
- Cape Saint Claire
- Capitol Heights
- Cavetown
- Charlotte Hall
- Cearfoss
- Cedarville
- Centreville
- Charlton
- Chesapeake Beach
- Chester
- Cheverly
- Chevy Chase Section 3
- Chevy Chase Section 5
- Chevy Chase View
- Chevy Chase Village
- Chewsville
- Church Hill
- Clear Spring
- Cobb Island
- Colmar Manor
- Coral Hills
- Cottage City
- Croom
- Crownsville
- Dargan
- Darlington
- Darnestown
- Deale
- Derwood
- District Heights
- Downsville
- Drum Point
- Dunkirk
- Eagle Harbor
- Eakles Mill
- Edgemere
- Edgemont
- Edgewater
- Edmonston
- Emmitsburg
- Ernstville
- Fairmount Heights
- Fairplay
- Fairview
- Fairwood
- Fallston
- Forest Glen
- Forest Heights
- Fort Meade
- Fort Ritchie
- Fountainhead-Orchard Hills
- Four Corners
- Friendly
- Friendship
- Friendship Heights Village
- Fulton
- Funkstown
- Galesville
- Gambrills
- Gapland
- Garrett Park
- Garretts Mill
- Garrison
- Glen Echo
- Glenarden
- Golden Beach
- Grasonville
- Greensburg
- Hampstead
- Hampton
- Hancock
- Herald Harbor
- Highfield-Cascade
- Highland
- Highland Beach
- Hillandale
- Hughesville
- Huntingtown
- Indian Head
- Indian Springs
- Jarrettsville
- Jefferson
- Jessup
- Jugtown
- Keedysville
- Kemps Mill
- Kensington
- Kent Narrows
- Kingstown
- Kingsville
- Konterra
- La Plata
- Lake Arbor
- Landover Hills
- Lansdowne
- Layhill
- Laytonsville
- Leisure World
- Leitersburg
- Leonardtown
- Libertytown
- Linganore
- Long Beach
- Lusby
- Lutherville
- Manchester
- Mapleville
- Marlboro Meadows
- Marlboro Village
- Marlow Heights
- Marlton
- Martin's Additions
- Maugansville
- Mayo
- Mechanicsville
- Melwood
- Mercersville
- Middleburg
- Middletown
- Monrovia
- Morningside
- Mount Aetna
- Mount Airy
- Mount Briar
- Mount Lena
- Mount Rainier
- Myersville
- National Harbor
- Naval Academy
- New Market
- New Windsor
- North Beach
- North Brentwood
- North Chevy Chase
- North Kensington
- North Laurel
- Owings
- Paramount-Long Meadow
- Pecktonville
- Peppermill Village
- Perryman
- Pinesburg
- Piney Point
- Pleasant Hills
- Point of Rocks
- Pomfret
- Pondsville
- Poolesville
- Port Tobacco Village
- Potomac Heights
- Prince Frederick
- Pylesville
- Queen Anne, Prince George's County
- Queen Anne, Queen Anne's County
- Queensland
- Queenstown
- Reid
- Ringgold
- Riva
- Riverdale Park
- Riverside
- Robinwood
- Rock Point
- Rohrersville
- Rosemont
- Sabillasville
- St. George Island
- Saint James
- Saint Leonard
- San Mar
- Sandy Hook
- Savage
- Seat Pleasant
- Shady Side
- Sharpsburg
- Silver Hill
- Smithsburg
- Solomons
- Somerset
- South Kensington
- Spencerville
- Spring Ridge
- Springdale
- Stevensville
- Sudlersville
- Sykesville
- Tall Timbers
- Taneytown
- Temple Hills
- Templeville
- Thurmont
- Tilghmanton
- Timonium
- Trego-Rohrersville Station
- Union Bridge
- University Park
- Upper Marlboro
- Urbana
- Walkersville
- Washington Grove
- West Laurel
- Westphalia
- White Marsh
- Williamsport
- Wilson-Conococheague
- Woodlawn, Prince George's County
- Woodmore
- Woodsboro
- Yarrowsburg

=== Virginia ===
- Aquia Harbour
- Arcola
- Bealeton
- Belle Haven
- Belmont
- Berryville
- Boswell's Corner
- Boyce
- Brambleton
- Bull Run Mountain Estates
- Calverton
- Catlett
- Clifton
- County Center
- Crosspointe
- Dahlgren
- Dulles Town Center (major airport: Washington Dulles International Airport)
- Dumfries
- Dunn Loring
- Fair Lakes
- Fairview Beach
- Falmouth
- Floris
- Fort Belvoir
- George Mason
- Greenbriar
- Hamilton
- Hayfield
- Haymarket
- Hillsboro
- Independent Hill
- King George
- Kings Park
- Lake Barcroft
- Laurel Hill
- Linton Hall
- Loch Lomond
- Long Branch
- Loudoun Valley Estates
- Lovettsville
- Mantua
- Marshall
- Mason Neck
- Middleburg
- Midland
- Moorefield Station
- New Baltimore
- Nokesville
- North Springfield
- Oak Grove
- Occoquan
- Opal
- Pimmit Hills
- Potomac Mills
- Purcellville
- Quantico
- Quantico Base
- Ravensworth
- Remington
- Round Hill
- Seven Corners
- Shenandoah Retreat
- South Run
- Southern Gateway
- Spotsylvania Courthouse
- Stafford Courthouse
- Stone Ridge
- The Plains
- Triangle
- University Center
- Warrenton
- Woodburn
- Yorkshire

=== West Virginia ===
- Bolivar
- Charles Town
- Falling Waters
- Harpers Ferry
- Hedgesville
- Inwood
- Middleway
- Ranson
- Shannondale
- Shenandoah Junction
- Shepherdstown
