= Maryland highway system =

Highway system in Maryland, United States

- Standard route signs in Maryland

Highway names
- Interstates: Interstate X (I-X)
- US Highways: U.S. Route X (US X)
- State: Maryland Route X (MD X)

System links
- Maryland highway system; Interstate; US; State; Scenic Byways

The Maryland highway system is a network of highways owned and maintained by the U.S. state of Maryland. In addition to the nationally numbered Interstate Highways and U.S. Highways, the highway system consists of a network of Maryland state-numbered highways. All three types of highways together provide access to all incorporated and unincorporated areas in all 23 counties of Maryland as well as the independent city of Baltimore.

== Highway systems ==
=== Interstate highways ===
Maryland has 14 Interstate highways. The longest Interstate in Maryland is Interstate 95, while the shortest Interstate is I-295. Maryland also contains an unsigned Interstate, I-595; a former Interstate, I-170; and an intracounty Interstate, I-97, which is also the shortest primary highway in the Interstate Highway System.

=== U.S. highways ===
Maryland has 14 U.S. Highways, including seven primary U.S. Highways and seven auxiliary U.S. highways. The longest U.S. highway in Maryland is U.S. Route 40, while the shortest U.S. highway is US 522. Maryland also contains six former U.S. highways.

=== Maryland state highways ===
Maryland has a unitary system of numbered state highways with numbers between 2 and 999. The longest Maryland state highway is Maryland Route 2, while several state highways are less than 0.5 mi (0.80 km) in length. Most of the shortest highways are unsigned. Several state highways have multiple disjoint segments that are denoted internally by suffixes, encompassing either old alignments of a major highway or a collection of service roads related to a particular highway.

=== Other systems ===
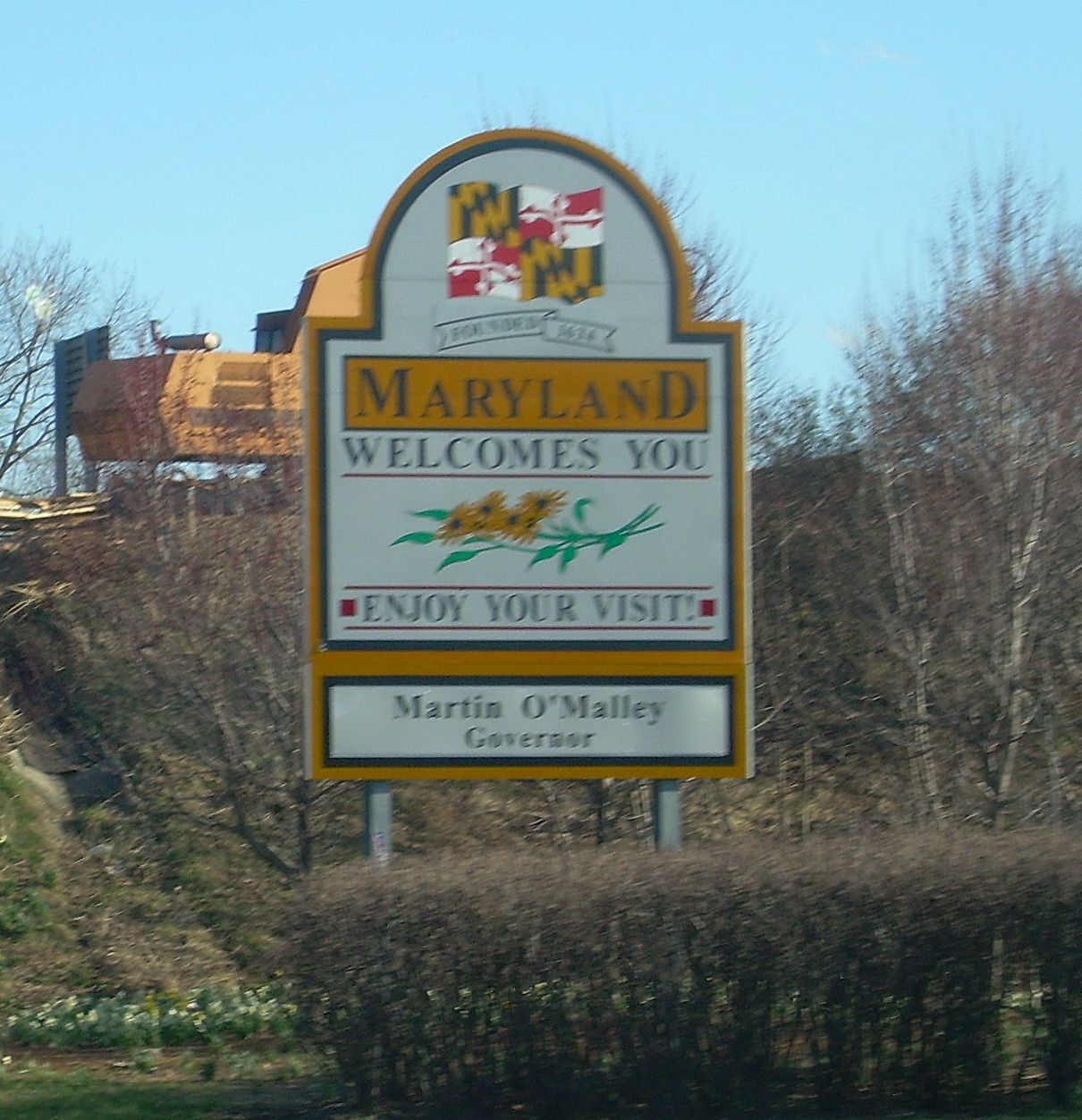
Welcome sign along Interstate 81

There are other systems of highways in Maryland that are not marked but are numbered internally.

- County highways: All 23 counties have internal numerical designations for all highways under their jurisdiction.
- Municipal highways: Every city, town, and village maintains an internal system of numerically designated municipal streets.
- Federal government or agency highways: Highways maintained by the federal government or agencies such as the Maryland-National Capital Park and Planning Commission are designated inventory numbers. Examples of highways within this category include parkways, such as the Clara Barton Parkway or Sligo Creek Parkway; streets on federal research campuses, such as those of the National Institutes of Health or Goddard Space Flight Center; roads on military bases, such as those on Fort Meade; and roads within reservations of the National Park Service, such as Bayberry Drive within Assateague Island National Seashore.
- State reservation highways: Highways maintained by non-highways agencies of the state of Maryland. Examples of highways within this categories include streets on state university campuses, access roads to state parks and state forests, and highways within state-owned airports.

== Highway agencies ==
=== Maryland State Highway Administration ===
The vast majority of Interstate, U.S., and state highways are constructed by and maintained by the Maryland State Highway Administration (MDSHA).

=== Maryland Transportation Authority ===
All toll facilities in the state and limited access highways within Baltimore except I-83 are constructed and maintained by the Maryland Transportation Authority (MdTA).

=== Other agencies ===
All U.S. and state highways and I-83 within Baltimore are maintained by the Baltimore City Department of Transportation. Portions of U.S. and state highways within particular cities and towns are maintained by the respective municipalities.

== Gallery ==
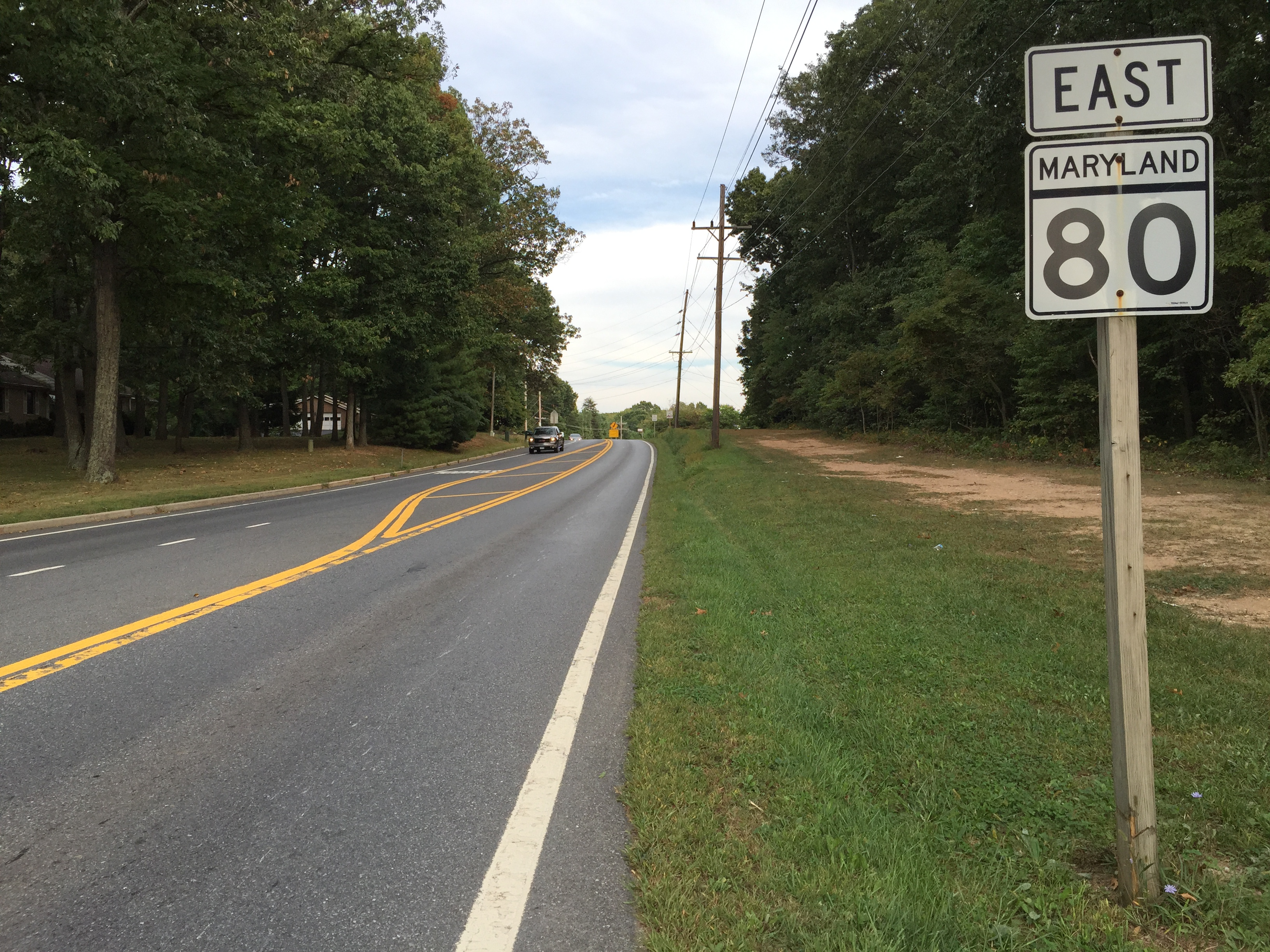
Maryland Route 80

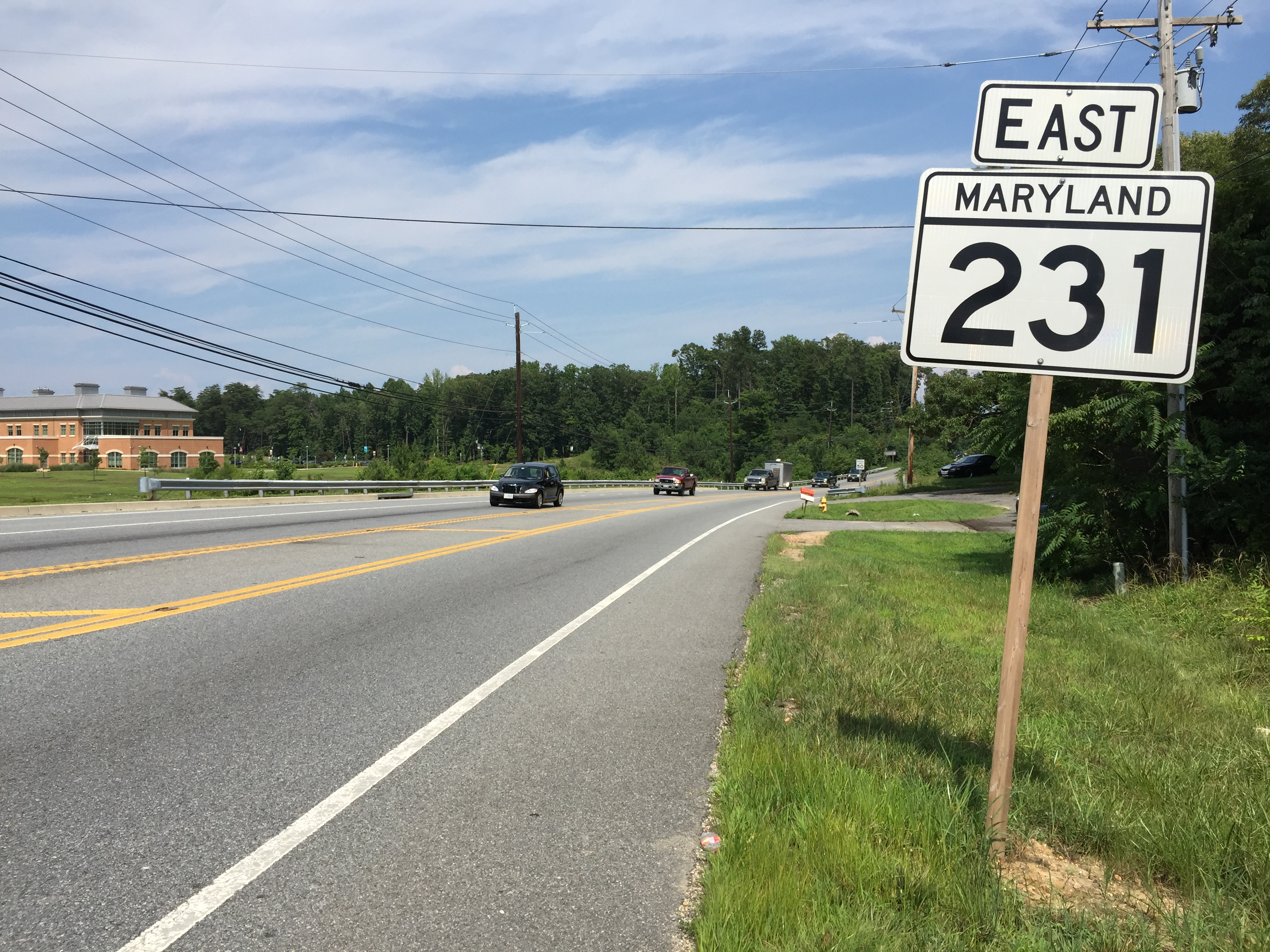
Maryland Route 231

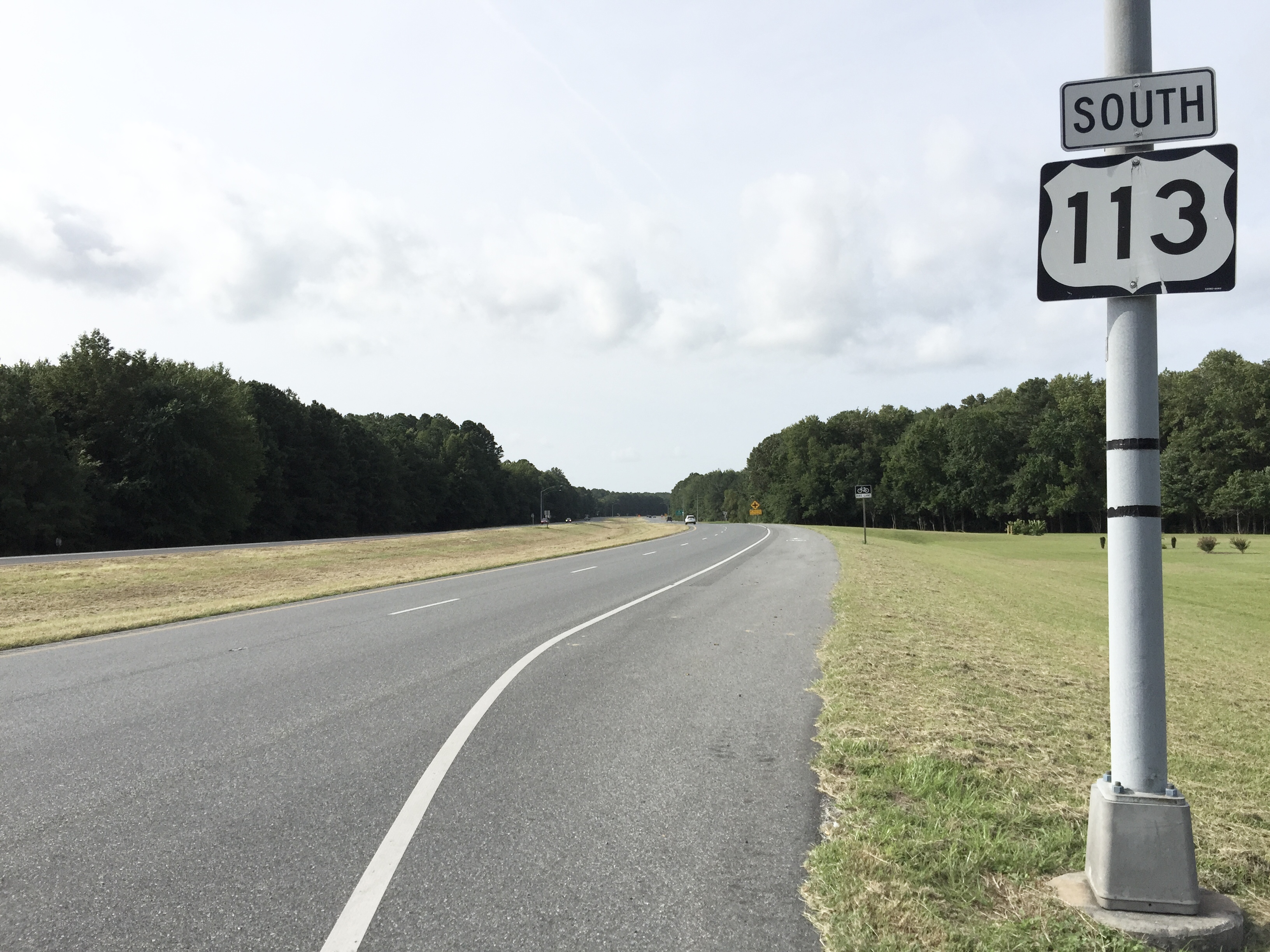
U.S. Route 113

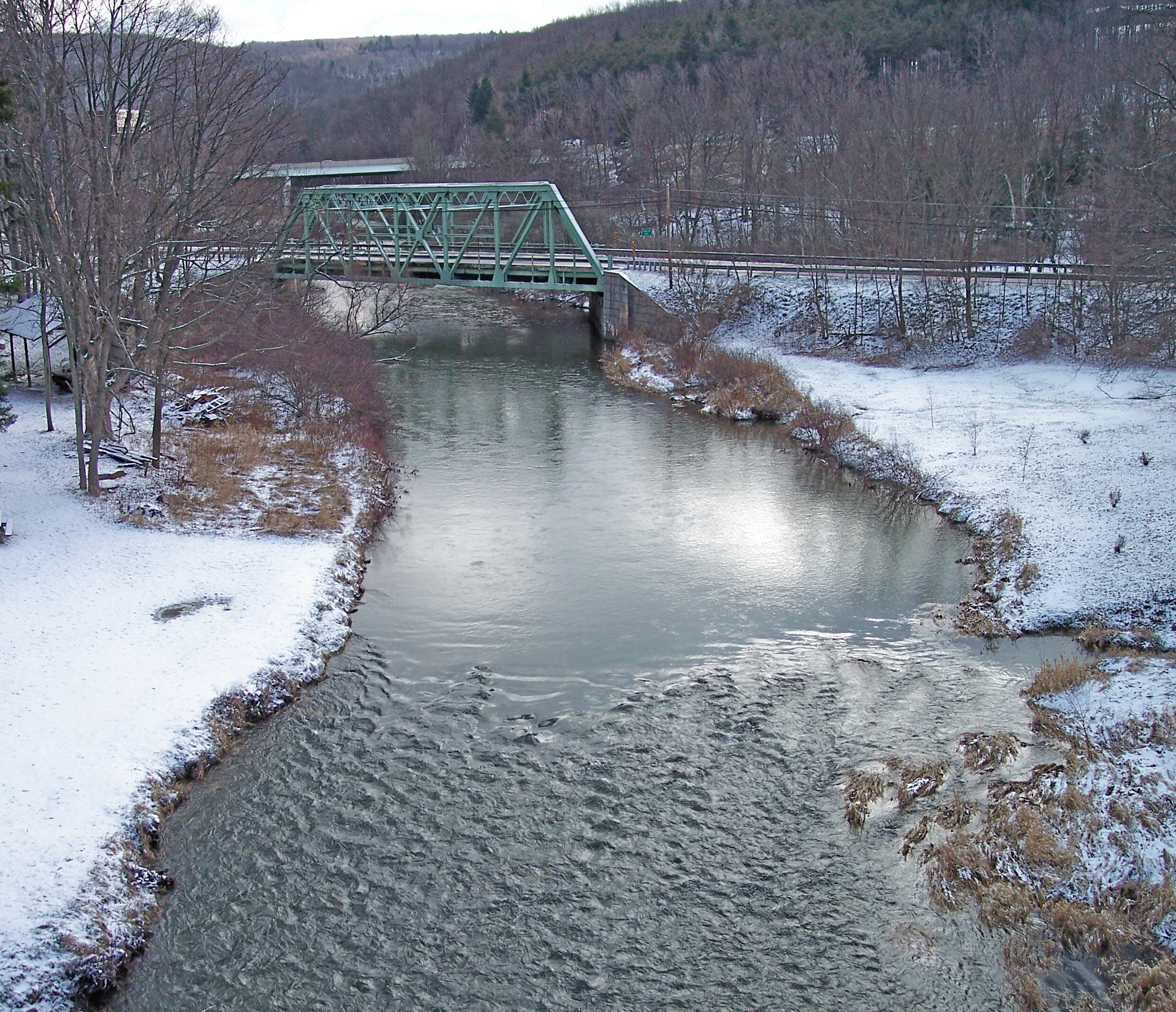
U.S. Route 40 Alternate (Keysers Ridge–Cumberland, Maryland)

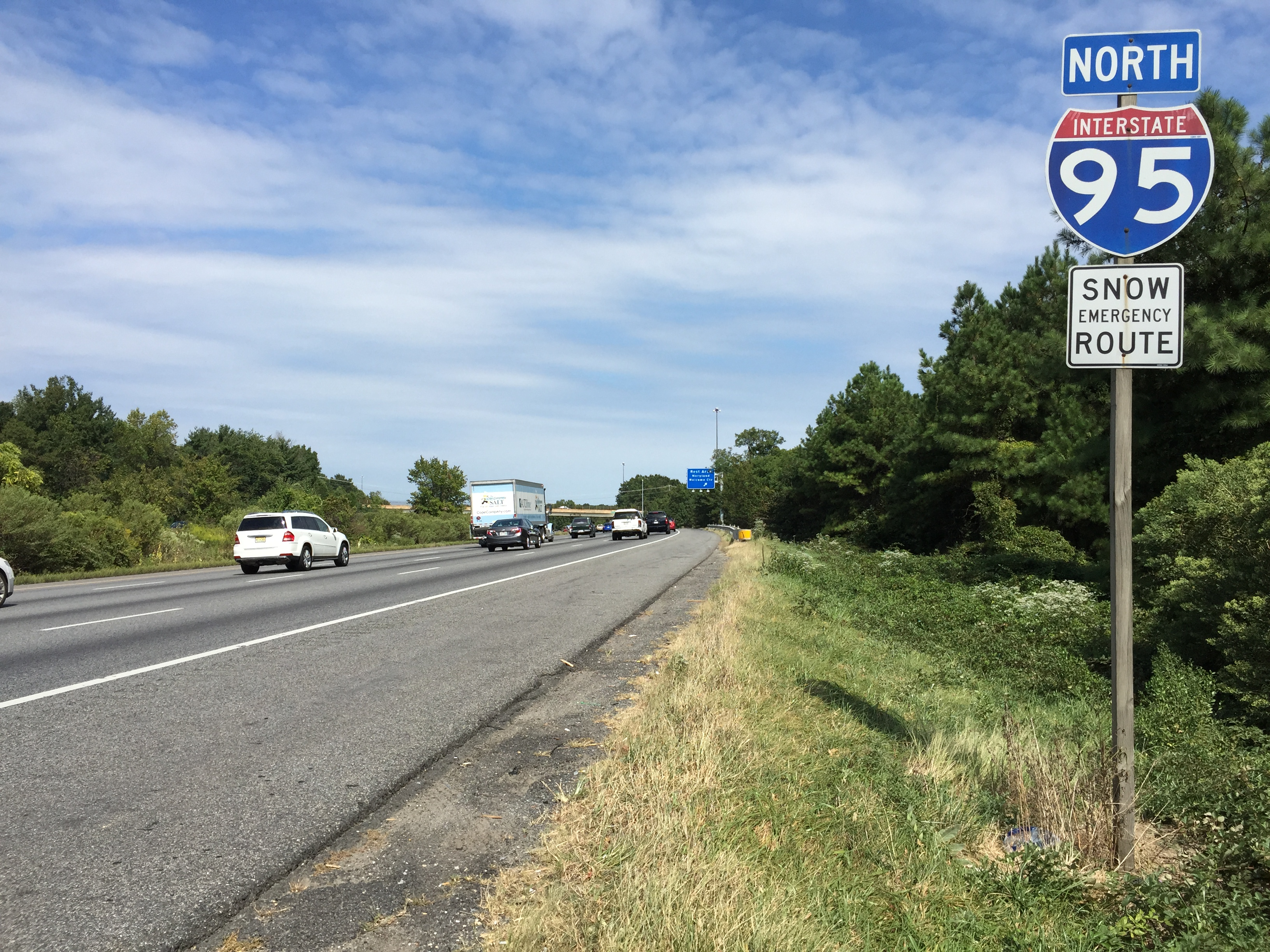
Interstate 95
