= Jugtown =

Jugtown may refer to a location in the United States:

- Gardendale, Alabama, formerly known as Jugtown
- Jugtown, Maryland, a census-designated place
- Jugtown, Pennsylvania, a census-designated place
- Jugtown Historic District, Princeton, New Jersey
- Jugtown Pottery in Seagrove, North Carolina, a location listed on the National Register of Historic Places
- Sterrett, Alabama, also known as Jugtown
