= Wildewood, Maryland =

- Census-designated place
- Location within Maryland Location within the United States
- Coordinates: 38°18′11″N 76°32′47″W
- Country: United States
- State: Maryland
- County: St. Mary's

Area
  - Total: 2.93 sq mi (7.58 km^{2})
  - Land: 2.83 sq mi (7.32 km^{2})
  - Water: 0.10 sq mi (0.26 km^{2})
- Elevation: 105 ft (32 m)

Population (2020)
  - Total: 7,821
  - Density: 2,767.3/sq mi (1,068.46/km^{2})
- Time zone: UTC-5 (Eastern (EST))
  - Summer (DST): UTC-4 (EDT)
- ZIP Codes: 20619 (California); 20636 (Hollywood)
- Area codes: 301, 240
- FIPS code: 24-84784
- GNIS feature ID: 2806311

Wildewood is a planned community and census-designated place (CDP) in St. Mary's County, Maryland, United States. It is in east-central St. Mary's County, 7 miles (11 km) east of Leonardtown, the county seat, and 58 miles (93 km) southeast of Washington, D.C. It is bordered to the east by the unincorporated community of California. Homesites feature large shade trees.

Wildewood was first listed as a CDP prior to the 2020 census which listed a population of 7,821.

== Demographics ==
Historical population
Census	Pop.	Note	%±
2020	7,821		—
U.S. Decennial Census; 2020

=== 2020 census ===
As of the 2020 census, Wildewood had a population of 7,821. The median age was 34.2 years. 27.5% of residents were under the age of 18 and 10.5% of residents were 65 years of age or older. For every 100 females there were 94.7 males, and for every 100 females age 18 and over there were 91.6 males age 18 and over.

100.0% of residents lived in urban areas, while 0.0% lived in rural areas.

There were 3,119 households in Wildewood, of which 34.9% had children under the age of 18 living in them. Of all households, 47.6% were married-couple households, 18.8% were households with a male householder and no spouse or partner present, and 26.5% were households with a female householder and no spouse or partner present. About 30.3% of all households were made up of individuals and 8.2% had someone living alone who was 65 years of age or older.

There were 3,244 housing units, of which 3.9% were vacant. The homeowner vacancy rate was 2.0% and the rental vacancy rate was 2.9%.

Wildewood CDP, Maryland - Demographic Profile (NH = Non-Hispanic)
Race / Ethnicity	Pop 2020	% 2020
White alone (NH)	5,579	71.33%
Black or African American alone (NH)	703	8.99%
Native American or Alaska Native alone (NH)	17	0.22%
Asian alone (NH)	456	5.83%
Pacific Islander alone (NH)	6	0.08%
Some Other Race alone (NH)	43	0.55%
Mixed Race/Multi-Racial (NH)	482	6.16%
Hispanic or Latino (any race)	535	6.84%
Total	7,821	100.00%

Note: the US Census treats Hispanic/Latino as an ethnic category. This table excludes Latinos from the racial categories and assigns them to a separate category. Hispanics/Latinos can be of any race.
