= List of municipalities in Maryland =

Map of the United States with Maryland highlighted

Maryland is a state located in the Southern United States. As of the 2020 United States census, Maryland is the 18th-most populous state with 6,177,224 inhabitants and the ninth-smallest by land area, spanning 9,707.24 square miles (25,141.6 km^{2}) of land. The state is divided into 23 counties and contains 157 municipalities consisting of cities, towns, or villages. Its municipalities cover only 4.4% of the state's land mass but are home to 26.2% of its population. As Maryland's minor civil divisions (MCDs) are simply voting districts, and do not have governments of their own like other MCDs such as townships, areas outside of municipalities have no government below the county level.

With the exception of Baltimore, which was chartered by the state Constitution, municipalities in Maryland are self-governing municipalities chartered as cities, towns, or villages by an Act of the Maryland General Assembly or, in some cases, by a referendum. (Note: In the case of certain villages, the municipal charter was created by a referendum of qualified voters in each respective jurisdiction in accordance with Article 23A, Sections 20 through 30 of the Annotated Code of Maryland.) Municipalities are the lowest tier administrative units in the state, and all except Baltimore are also subject to county administration. Despite the designations of city, town, or village, there are no differences in municipal power and authority. There is no official classification of municipal governments and the municipalities are equal under state law. The municipalities themselves decide whether to avail themselves of the specific powers conferred on them by the Maryland Constitution and state code. Since its separation from Baltimore County in 1851, the City of Baltimore functions more as a county than a city under state law since it exercises charter home rule, which empowers the city with broad legislative authority similar to Maryland's six home rule counties.

The largest municipality by population in Maryland is Baltimore, an independent city, with 585,708 residents, and the smallest municipality by population is Port Tobacco Village with 18 residents. The largest municipality by land area is also Baltimore, which spans 80.94 mi^{2} (209.6 km^{2}), while Brookview is the smallest at 0.04 mi^{2} (0.10 km^{2}). Many of Maryland's largest population centers, including Bethesda, Columbia, Dundalk, Ellicott City, Germantown, Glen Burnie, Silver Spring, Towson and Waldorf are unincorporated census designated places. Howard and Baltimore counties have no municipalities in them.

== List of municipalities ==
Largest municipalities in Maryland by population

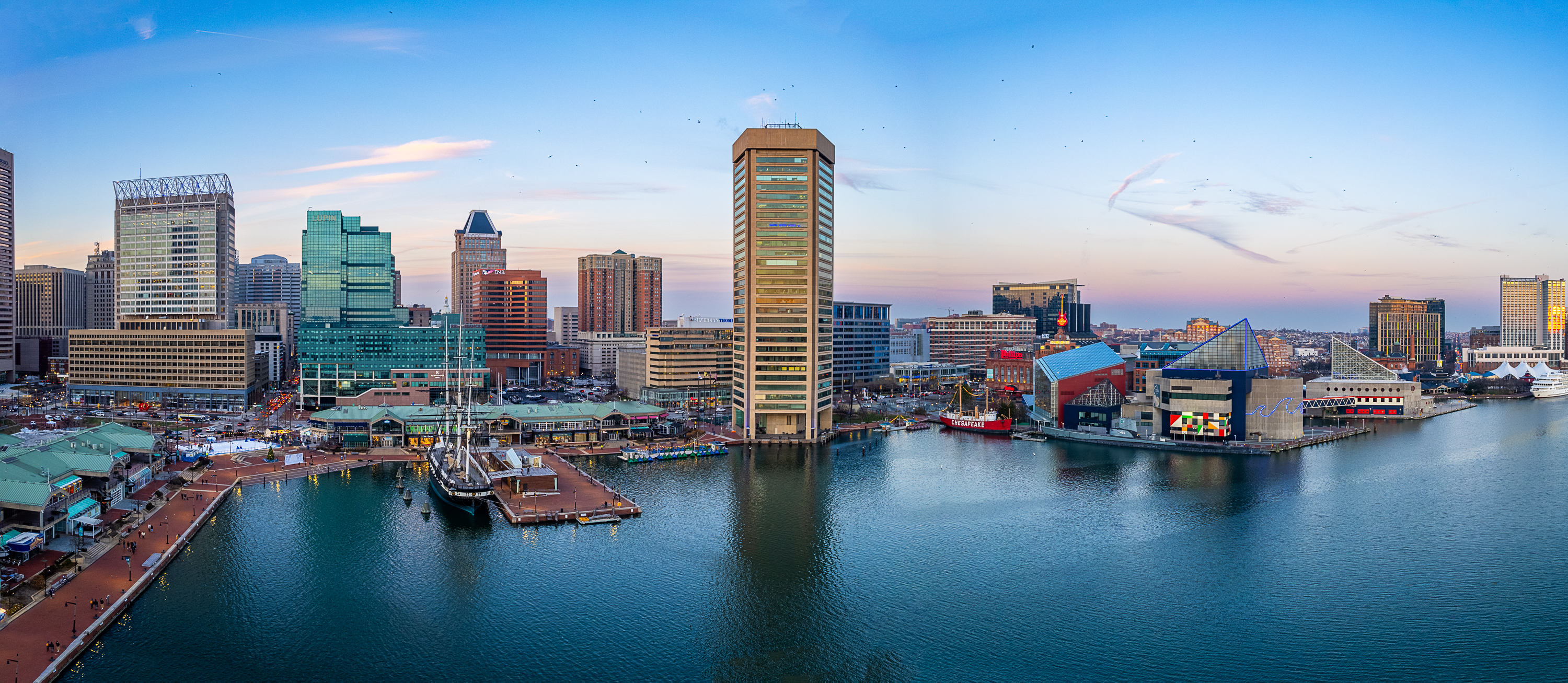
Skyline of Baltimore, the largest municipality in Maryland by population

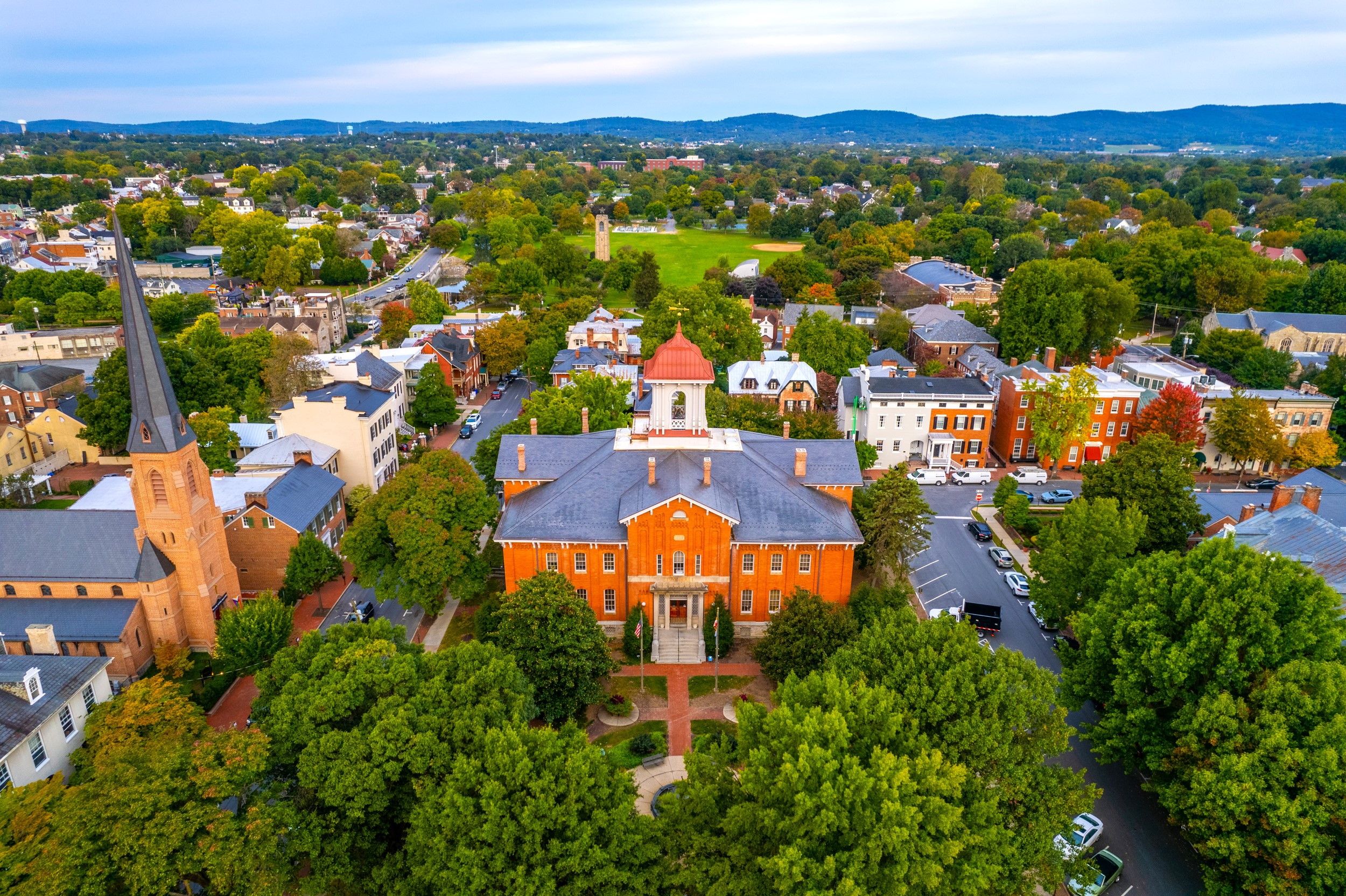
Frederick, the second-largest municipality in Maryland by population

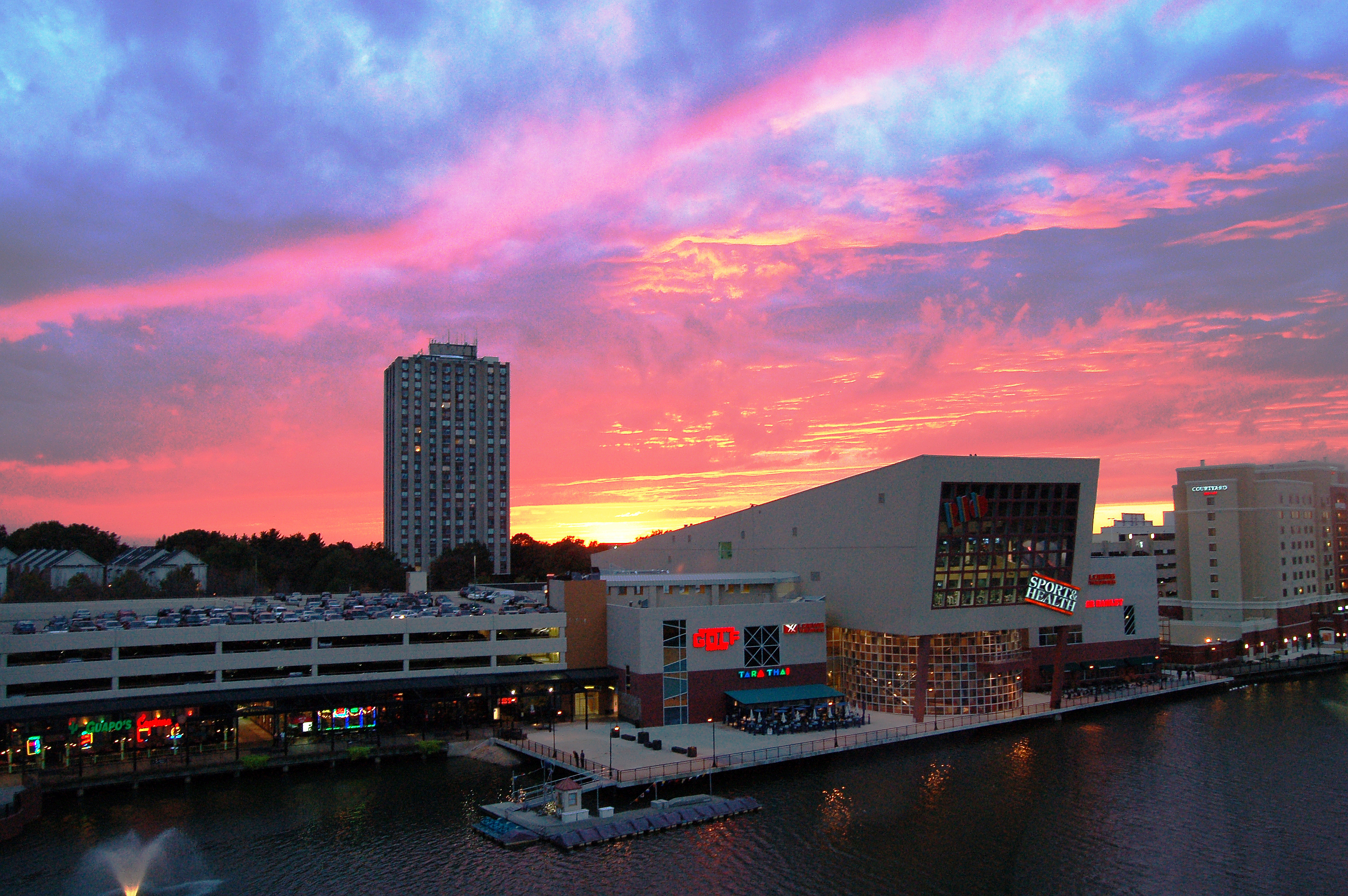
Gaithersburg, a suburb of Washington, D.C., and third-largest municipality by population

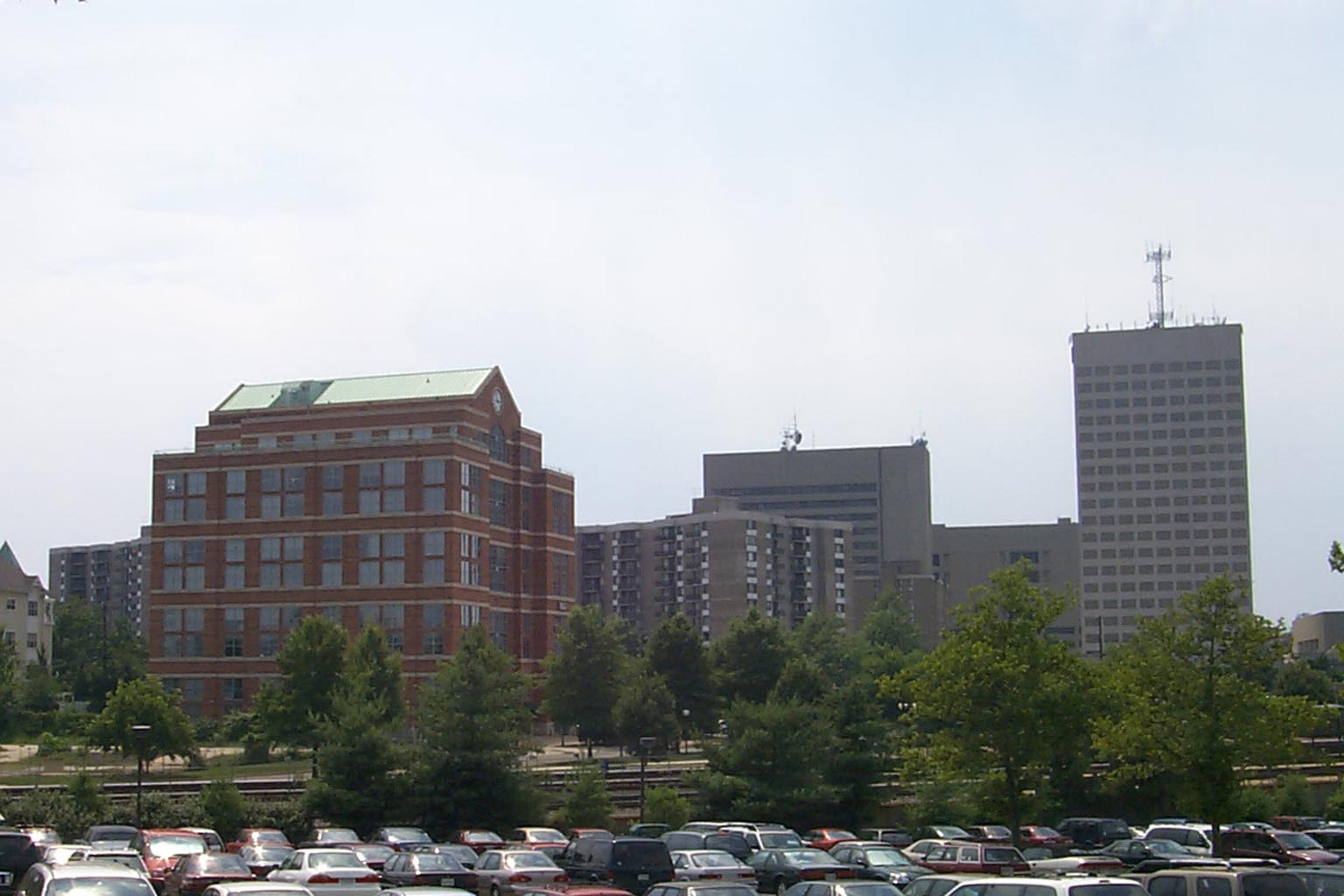
Rockville, a suburb of Washington, D.C., and fourth-largest municipality by population

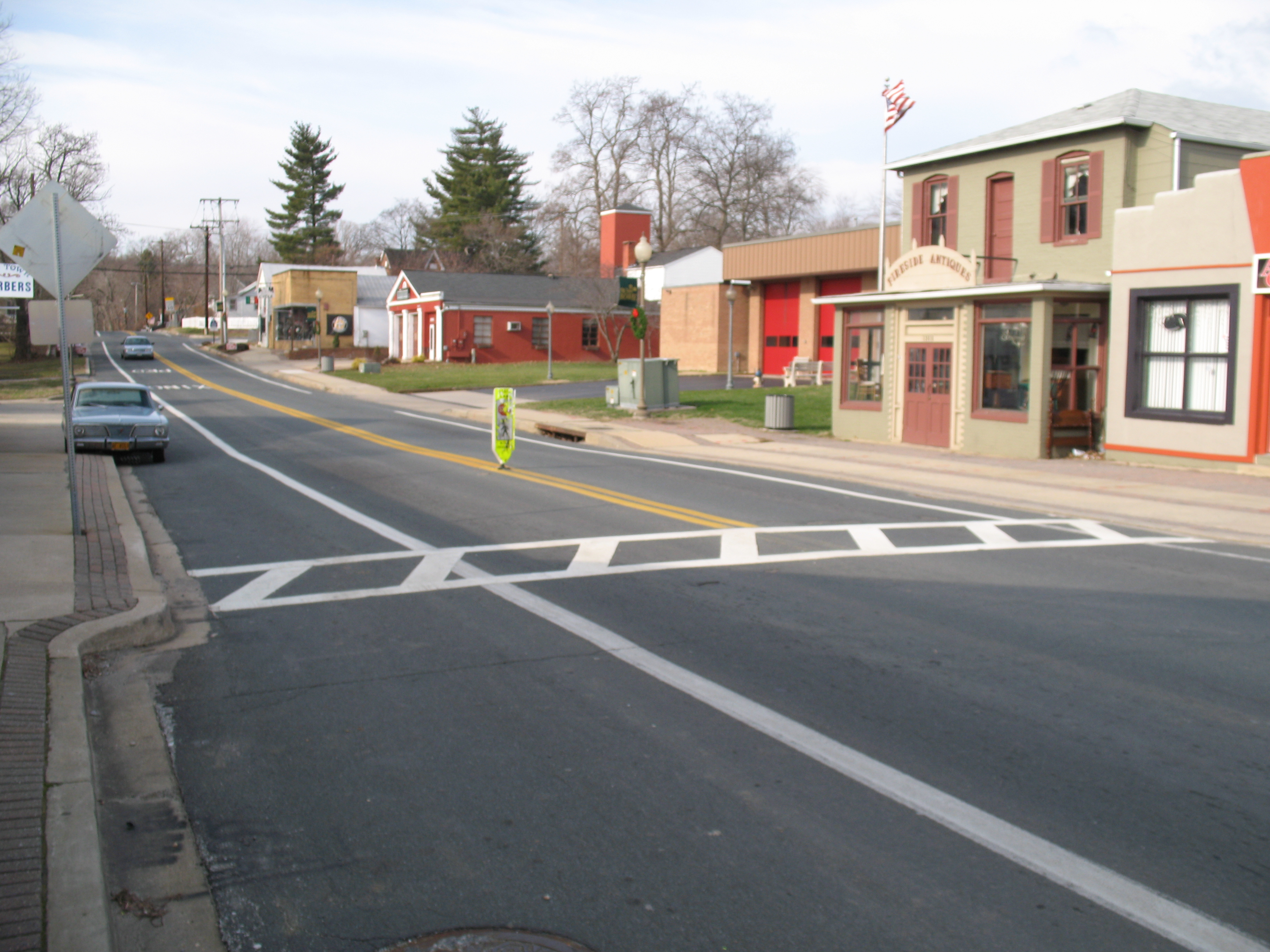
Bowie, the fifth-largest municipality in Maryland by population

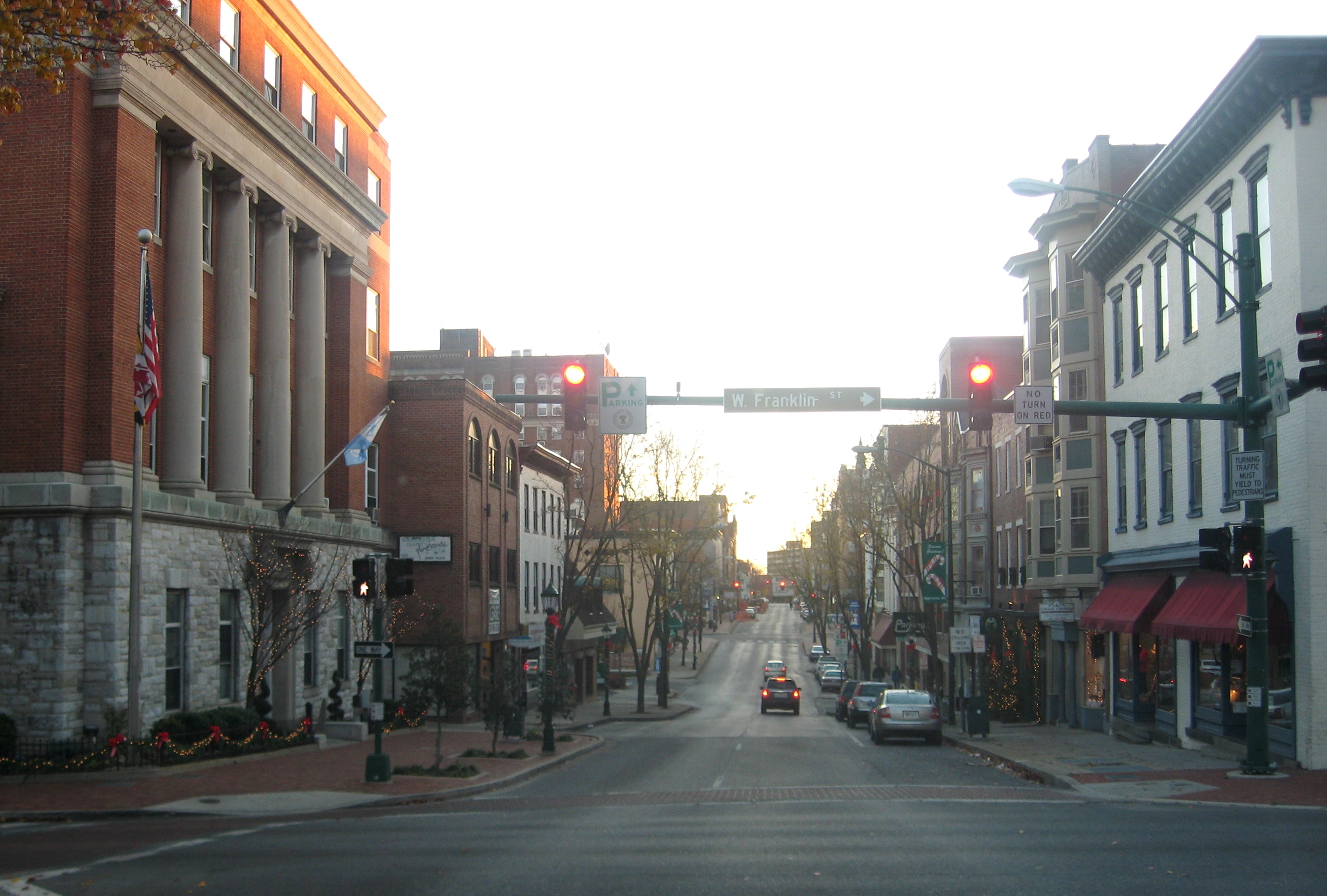
Hagerstown, Maryland's sixth-largest municipality by population

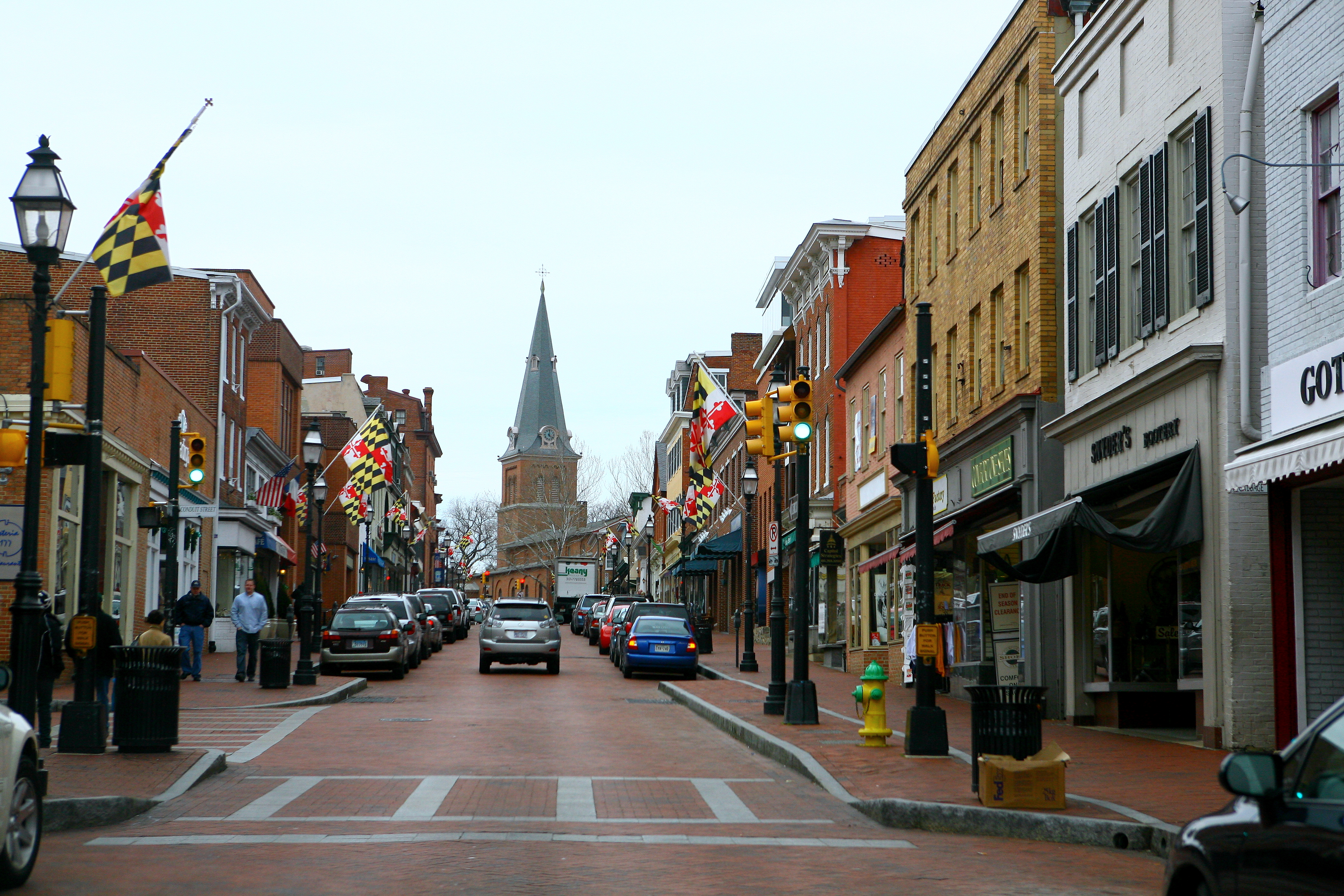
Annapolis, the state's capital and seventh-largest city by population

‡ State capital and county seat

† County seat

List of municipalities in Maryland
Name	Type	County(ies)	Population (2020)	Population (2010)	Change	Land area (2010)		Population density
Name	Type	County(ies)	Population (2020)	Population (2010)	Change	sq mi	km^{2}	Population density
Aberdeen	City	Harford	16,254	14,959	+8.7%	6.80	17.6	2,390.3/sq mi (922.9/km^{2})
Accident	Town	Garrett	338	325	+4.0%	0.49	1.3	689.8/sq mi (266.3/km^{2})
Annapolis‡	City	Anne Arundel	40,812	38,394	+6.3%	7.18	18.6	5,684.1/sq mi (2,194.7/km^{2})
Baltimore	City	Independent city	585,708	620,961	−5.7%	80.94	209.6	7,236.3/sq mi (2,794.0/km^{2})
Barclay	Town	Queen Anne's	183	120	+52.5%	0.16	0.41	1,143.8/sq mi (441.6/km^{2})
Barnesville	Town	Montgomery	144	172	−16.3%	0.49	1.3	293.9/sq mi (113.5/km^{2})
Barton	Town	Allegany	464	457	+1.5%	0.22	0.57	2,109.1/sq mi (814.3/km^{2})
Bel Air†	Town	Harford	10,661	10,120	+5.3%	2.93	7.6	3,638.6/sq mi (1,404.9/km^{2})
Berlin	Town	Worcester	5,026	4,485	+12.1%	3.15	8.2	1,595.6/sq mi (616.0/km^{2})
Berwyn Heights	Town	Prince George's	3,345	3,123	+7.1%	0.69	1.8	4,847.8/sq mi (1,871.8/km^{2})
Betterton	Town	Kent	286	345	−17.1%	0.99	2.6	288.9/sq mi (111.5/km^{2})
Bladensburg	Town	Prince George's	9,657	9,148	+5.6%	1.00	2.6	9,657.0/sq mi (3,728.6/km^{2})
Boonsboro	Town	Washington	3,799	3,336	+13.9%	2.90	7.5	1,310.0/sq mi (505.8/km^{2})
Bowie	City	Prince George's	58,329	54,727	+6.6%	18.43	47.7	3,164.9/sq mi (1,222.0/km^{2})
Brentwood	Town	Prince George's	3,828	3,046	+25.7%	0.38	0.98	10,073.7/sq mi (3,889.5/km^{2})
Brookeville	Town	Montgomery	166	134	+23.9%	0.12	0.31	1,383.3/sq mi (534.1/km^{2})
Brookview	Town	Dorchester	48	60	−20.0%	0.04	0.10	1,200.0/sq mi (463.3/km^{2})
Brunswick	City	Frederick	7,762	5,870	+32.2%	3.26	8.4	2,381.0/sq mi (919.3/km^{2})
Burkittsville	Town	Frederick	142	151	−6.0%	0.45	1.2	315.6/sq mi (121.8/km^{2})
Cambridge†	City	Dorchester	13,096	12,326	+6.2%	10.34	26.8	1,266.5/sq mi (489.0/km^{2})
Capitol Heights	Town	Prince George's	4,050	4,337	−6.6%	0.80	2.1	5,062.5/sq mi (1,954.6/km^{2})
Cecilton	Town	Cecil	676	663	+2.0%	0.46	1.2	1,469.6/sq mi (567.4/km^{2})
Centreville†	Town	Queen Anne's	4,727	4,285	+10.3%	2.45	6.3	1,929.4/sq mi (744.9/km^{2})
Charlestown	Town	Cecil	1,496	1,183	+26.5%	1.19	3.1	1,257.1/sq mi (485.4/km^{2})
Chesapeake Beach	Town	Calvert	6,356	5,753	+10.5%	2.71	7.0	2,345.4/sq mi (905.6/km^{2})
Chesapeake City	Town	Cecil	736	673	+9.4%	0.50	1.3	1,472.0/sq mi (568.3/km^{2})
Chestertown†	Town	Kent	5,532	5,252	+5.3%	2.60	6.7	2,127.7/sq mi (821.5/km^{2})
Cheverly	Town	Prince George's	6,170	6,173	0.0%	1.35	3.5	4,570.4/sq mi (1,764.6/km^{2})
Chevy Chase	Town	Montgomery	2,904	2,824	+2.8%	0.47	1.2	6,178.7/sq mi (2,385.6/km^{2})
Chevy Chase Section Five	Village	Montgomery	672	658	+2.1%	0.10	0.26	6,720.0/sq mi (2,594.6/km^{2})
Chevy Chase Section Three	Village	Montgomery	802	760	+5.5%	0.12	0.31	6,683.3/sq mi (2,580.4/km^{2})
Chevy Chase View	Town	Montgomery	1,005	920	+9.2%	0.28	0.73	3,589.3/sq mi (1,385.8/km^{2})
Chevy Chase Village	Town	Montgomery	2,049	1,953	+4.9%	0.42	1.1	4,878.6/sq mi (1,883.6/km^{2})
Church Creek	Town	Dorchester	102	125	−18.4%	0.34	0.88	300.0/sq mi (115.8/km^{2})
Church Hill	Town	Queen Anne's	808	745	+8.5%	0.71	1.8	1,138.0/sq mi (439.4/km^{2})
Clear Spring	Town	Washington	372	358	+3.9%	0.11	0.28	3,381.8/sq mi (1,305.7/km^{2})
College Park	City	Prince George's	34,740	30,413	+14.2%	5.64	14.6	6,159.6/sq mi (2,378.2/km^{2})
Colmar Manor	Town	Prince George's	1,588	1,404	+13.1%	0.47	1.2	3,378.7/sq mi (1,304.5/km^{2})
Cottage City	Town	Prince George's	1,335	1,305	+2.3%	0.25	0.65	5,340.0/sq mi (2,061.8/km^{2})
Crisfield	City	Somerset	2,475	2,726	−9.2%	1.62	4.2	1,527.8/sq mi (589.9/km^{2})
Cumberland†	City	Allegany	19,076	20,859	−8.5%	10.08	26.1	1,892.5/sq mi (730.7/km^{2})
Deer Park	Town	Garrett	303	399	−24.1%	1.00	2.6	303.0/sq mi (117.0/km^{2})
Delmar	Town	Wicomico	3,798	3,003	+26.5%	1.72	4.5	2,208.1/sq mi (852.6/km^{2})
Denton†	Town	Caroline	4,848	4,418	+9.7%	5.28	13.7	918.2/sq mi (354.5/km^{2})
District Heights	City	Prince George's	5,959	5,837	+2.1%	0.93	2.4	6,407.5/sq mi (2,474.0/km^{2})
Eagle Harbor	Town	Prince George's	67	63	+6.3%	0.12	0.31	558.3/sq mi (215.6/km^{2})
East New Market	Town	Dorchester	389	400	−2.7%	0.40	1.0	972.5/sq mi (375.5/km^{2})
Easton†	Town	Talbot	17,101	15,945	+7.2%	10.56	27.4	1,619.4/sq mi (625.3/km^{2})
Edmonston	Town	Prince George's	1,617	1,445	+11.9%	0.39	1.0	4,146.2/sq mi (1,600.8/km^{2})
Eldorado	Town	Dorchester	45	59	−23.7%	0.08	0.21	562.5/sq mi (217.2/km^{2})
Elkton†	Town	Cecil	15,807	15,443	+2.4%	8.35	21.6	1,893.1/sq mi (730.9/km^{2})
Emmitsburg	Town	Frederick	2,770	2,814	−1.6%	1.52	3.9	1,822.4/sq mi (703.6/km^{2})
Fairmount Heights	Town	Prince George's	1,528	1,494	+2.3%	0.27	0.70	5,659.3/sq mi (2,185.1/km^{2})
Federalsburg	Town	Caroline	2,833	2,739	+3.4%	1.93	5.0	1,467.9/sq mi (566.7/km^{2})
Forest Heights	Town	Prince George's	2,658	2,447	+8.6%	0.48	1.2	5,537.5/sq mi (2,138.0/km^{2})
Frederick†	City	Frederick	78,171	65,239	+19.8%	21.99	57.0	3,554.8/sq mi (1,372.5/km^{2})
Friendsville	Town	Garrett	438	491	−10.8%	0.91	2.4	481.3/sq mi (185.8/km^{2})
Frostburg	City	Allegany	7,027	9,002	−21.9%	3.42	8.9	2,054.7/sq mi (793.3/km^{2})
Fruitland	City	Wicomico	5,534	4,866	+13.7%	3.78	9.8	1,464.0/sq mi (565.3/km^{2})
Funkstown	Town	Washington	852	904	−5.8%	0.36	0.93	2,366.7/sq mi (913.8/km^{2})
Gaithersburg	City	Montgomery	69,657	59,933	+16.2%	10.20	26.4	6,829.1/sq mi (2,636.7/km^{2})
Galena	Town	Kent	539	612	−11.9%	0.36	0.93	1,497.2/sq mi (578.1/km^{2})
Galestown	Town	Dorchester	111	138	−19.6%	0.23	0.60	482.6/sq mi (186.3/km^{2})
Garrett Park	Town	Montgomery	996	992	+0.4%	0.26	0.67	3,830.8/sq mi (1,479.1/km^{2})
Glenarden	City	Prince George's	6,402	6,000	+6.7%	1.22	3.2	5,247.5/sq mi (2,026.1/km^{2})
Glen Echo	Town	Montgomery	279	255	+9.4%	0.10	0.26	2,790.0/sq mi (1,077.2/km^{2})
Goldsboro	Town	Caroline	211	246	−14.2%	0.74	1.9	285.1/sq mi (110.1/km^{2})
Grantsville	Town	Garrett	968	766	+26.4%	0.98	2.5	987.8/sq mi (381.4/km^{2})
Greenbelt	City	Prince George's	24,921	23,068	+8.0%	6.28	16.3	3,968.3/sq mi (1,532.2/km^{2})
Greensboro	Town	Caroline	1,919	1,931	−0.6%	1.05	2.7	1,827.6/sq mi (705.6/km^{2})
Hagerstown†	City	Washington	43,527	39,662	+9.7%	11.79	30.5	3,691.9/sq mi (1,425.4/km^{2})
Hampstead	Town	Carroll	6,241	6,323	−1.3%	3.19	8.3	1,956.4/sq mi (755.4/km^{2})
Hancock	Town	Washington	1,557	1,545	+0.8%	2.73	7.1	570.3/sq mi (220.2/km^{2})
Havre de Grace	City	Harford	14,807	12,952	+14.3%	5.50	14.2	2,692.2/sq mi (1,039.5/km^{2})
Hebron	Town	Wicomico	1,113	1,084	+2.7%	1.28	3.3	869.5/sq mi (335.7/km^{2})
Henderson	Town	Caroline	160	146	+9.6%	0.13	0.34	1,230.8/sq mi (475.2/km^{2})
Highland Beach	Town	Anne Arundel	118	96	+22.9%	0.06	0.16	1,966.7/sq mi (759.3/km^{2})
Hillsboro	Town	Caroline	128	161	−20.5%	0.15	0.39	853.3/sq mi (329.5/km^{2})
Hurlock	Town	Dorchester	2,070	2,092	−1.1%	2.66	6.9	778.2/sq mi (300.5/km^{2})
Hyattsville	City	Prince George's	21,187	17,557	+20.7%	2.67	6.9	7,935.2/sq mi (3,063.8/km^{2})
Indian Head	Town	Charles	3,894	3,844	+1.3%	1.23	3.2	3,165.9/sq mi (1,222.3/km^{2})
Keedysville	Town	Washington	1,213	1,152	+5.3%	0.92	2.4	1,318.5/sq mi (509.1/km^{2})
Kensington	Town	Montgomery	2,122	2,213	−4.1%	0.48	1.2	4,420.8/sq mi (1,706.9/km^{2})
Kitzmiller	Town	Garrett	300	321	−6.5%	0.22	0.57	1,363.6/sq mi (526.5/km^{2})
Landover Hills	Town	Prince George's	1,815	1,687	+7.6%	0.30	0.78	6,050.0/sq mi (2,335.9/km^{2})
La Plata†	Town	Charles	10,159	8,753	+16.1%	7.40	19.2	1,372.8/sq mi (530.1/km^{2})
Laurel	City	Prince George's	30,060	25,115	+19.7%	4.30	11.1	6,990.7/sq mi (2,699.1/km^{2})
Laytonsville	Town	Montgomery	572	353	+62.0%	1.04	2.7	550.0/sq mi (212.4/km^{2})
Leonardtown†	Town	St. Mary's	4,563	2,930	+55.7%	3.18	8.2	1,434.9/sq mi (554.0/km^{2})
Loch Lynn Heights	Town	Garrett	493	552	−10.7%	0.32	0.83	1,540.6/sq mi (594.8/km^{2})
Lonaconing	Town	Allegany	1,001	1,214	−17.5%	0.41	1.1	2,441.5/sq mi (942.7/km^{2})
Luke	Town	Allegany	85	65	+30.8%	0.27	0.70	314.8/sq mi (121.6/km^{2})
Manchester	Town	Carroll	5,408	4,808	+12.5%	2.34	6.1	2,311.1/sq mi (892.3/km^{2})
Mardela Springs	Town	Wicomico	357	347	+2.9%	0.39	1.0	915.4/sq mi (353.4/km^{2})
Martin's Additions	Village	Montgomery	946	933	+1.4%	0.14	0.36	6,757.1/sq mi (2,608.9/km^{2})
Marydel	Town	Caroline	176	141	+24.8%	0.08	0.21	2,200.0/sq mi (849.4/km^{2})
Middletown	Town	Frederick	4,943	4,136	+19.5%	1.74	4.5	2,840.8/sq mi (1,096.8/km^{2})
Midland	Town	Allegany	488	446	+9.4%	0.19	0.49	2,568.4/sq mi (991.7/km^{2})
Millington	Town	Kent, Queen Anne's	549	642	−14.5%	0.66	1.7	831.8/sq mi (321.2/km^{2})
Morningside	Town	Prince George's	1,240	2,015	−38.5%	0.56	1.5	2,214.3/sq mi (854.9/km^{2})
Mountain Lake Park	Town	Garrett	2,147	2,092	+2.6%	1.94	5.0	1,106.7/sq mi (427.3/km^{2})
Mount Airy	Town	Carroll, Frederick	9,654	9,288	+3.9%	4.12	10.7	2,343.2/sq mi (904.7/km^{2})
Mount Rainier	City	Prince George's	8,333	8,080	+3.1%	0.65	1.7	12,820.0/sq mi (4,949.8/km^{2})
Myersville	Town	Frederick	1,748	1,626	+7.5%	1.02	2.6	1,713.7/sq mi (661.7/km^{2})
New Carrollton	City	Prince George's	13,715	12,135	+13.0%	1.53	4.0	8,964.1/sq mi (3,461.0/km^{2})
New Market	Town	Frederick	1,525	656	+132.5%	0.80	2.1	1,906.3/sq mi (736.0/km^{2})
New Windsor	Town	Carroll	1,441	1,396	+3.2%	0.74	1.9	1,947.3/sq mi (751.9/km^{2})
North Beach	Town	Calvert	2,146	1,978	+8.5%	0.33	0.85	6,503.0/sq mi (2,510.8/km^{2})
North Brentwood	Town	Prince George's	593	517	+14.7%	0.10	0.26	5,930.0/sq mi (2,289.6/km^{2})
North Chevy Chase	Village	Montgomery	682	519	+31.4%	0.11	0.28	6,200.0/sq mi (2,393.8/km^{2})
North East	Town	Cecil	4,085	3,572	+14.4%	2.06	5.3	1,983.0/sq mi (765.6/km^{2})
Oakland†	Town	Garrett	1,851	1,925	−3.8%	2.59	6.7	714.7/sq mi (275.9/km^{2})
Ocean City	Town	Worcester	6,844	7,102	−3.6%	4.41	11.4	1,551.9/sq mi (599.2/km^{2})
Oxford	Town	Talbot	611	651	−6.1%	0.54	1.4	1,131.5/sq mi (436.9/km^{2})
Perryville	Town	Cecil	4,391	4,361	+0.7%	3.05	7.9	1,439.7/sq mi (555.9/km^{2})
Pittsville	Town	Wicomico	1,636	1,417	+15.5%	1.68	4.4	973.8/sq mi (376.0/km^{2})
Pocomoke City	City	Worcester	4,295	4,184	+2.7%	3.69	9.6	1,164.0/sq mi (449.4/km^{2})
Poolesville	Town	Montgomery	5,742	4,883	+17.6%	3.93	10.2	1,461.1/sq mi (564.1/km^{2})
Port Deposit	Town	Cecil	614	653	−6.0%	2.27	5.9	270.5/sq mi (104.4/km^{2})
Port Tobacco Village	Town	Charles	18	13	+38.5%	0.16	0.41	112.5/sq mi (43.4/km^{2})
Preston	Town	Caroline	673	719	−6.4%	0.57	1.5	1,180.7/sq mi (455.9/km^{2})
Princess Anne†	Town	Somerset	3,446	3,290	+4.7%	1.67	4.3	2,063.5/sq mi (796.7/km^{2})
Queen Anne	Town	Queen Anne's, Talbot	192	222	−13.5%	0.13	0.34	1,476.9/sq mi (570.2/km^{2})
Queenstown	Town	Queen Anne's	705	664	+6.2%	1.45	3.8	486.2/sq mi (187.7/km^{2})
Ridgely	Town	Caroline	1,611	1,639	−1.7%	1.78	4.6	905.1/sq mi (349.4/km^{2})
Rising Sun	Town	Cecil	2,740	2,781	−1.5%	1.26	3.3	2,174.6/sq mi (839.6/km^{2})
Riverdale Park	Town	Prince George's	7,351	6,956	+5.7%	1.65	4.3	4,455.2/sq mi (1,720.1/km^{2})
Rock Hall	Town	Kent	1,198	1,310	−8.5%	1.34	3.5	894.0/sq mi (345.2/km^{2})
Rockville†	City	Montgomery	67,117	61,209	+9.7%	13.51	35.0	4,967.9/sq mi (1,918.1/km^{2})
Rosemont	Village	Frederick	272	294	−7.5%	0.56	1.5	485.7/sq mi (187.5/km^{2})
St. Michaels	Town	Talbot	1,049	1,029	+1.9%	1.15	3.0	912.2/sq mi (352.2/km^{2})
Salisbury†	City	Wicomico	33,050	30,343	+8.9%	13.40	34.7	2,466.4/sq mi (952.3/km^{2})
Seat Pleasant	City	Prince George's	4,522	4,542	−0.4%	0.73	1.9	6,194.5/sq mi (2,391.7/km^{2})
Secretary	Town	Dorchester	472	535	−11.8%	0.26	0.67	1,815.4/sq mi (700.9/km^{2})
Sharpsburg	Town	Washington	560	705	−20.6%	0.23	0.60	2,434.8/sq mi (940.1/km^{2})
Sharptown	Town	Wicomico	691	651	+6.1%	0.41	1.1	1,685.4/sq mi (650.7/km^{2})
Smithsburg	Town	Washington	2,977	2,975	+0.1%	1.05	2.7	2,835.2/sq mi (1,094.7/km^{2})
Snow Hill†	Town	Worcester	2,156	2,103	+2.5%	3.01	7.8	716.3/sq mi (276.6/km^{2})
Somerset	Town	Montgomery	1,187	1,216	−2.4%	0.27	0.70	4,396.3/sq mi (1,697.4/km^{2})
Sudlersville	Town	Queen Anne's	507	497	+2.0%	0.94	2.4	539.4/sq mi (208.2/km^{2})
Sykesville	Town	Carroll	4,316	4,436	−2.7%	1.58	4.1	2,731.6/sq mi (1,054.7/km^{2})
Takoma Park	City	Montgomery	17,629	16,715	+5.5%	2.08	5.4	8,475.5/sq mi (3,272.4/km^{2})
Taneytown	City	Carroll	7,234	6,728	+7.5%	3.03	7.8	2,387.5/sq mi (921.8/km^{2})
Templeville	Town	Caroline, Queen Anne's	113	138	−18.1%	0.08	0.21	1,412.5/sq mi (545.4/km^{2})
Thurmont	Town	Frederick	6,213	6,170	+0.7%	3.12	8.1	1,991.3/sq mi (768.9/km^{2})
Trappe	Town	Talbot	1,177	1,077	+9.3%	2.78	7.2	423.4/sq mi (163.5/km^{2})
Union Bridge	Town	Carroll	936	975	−4.0%	1.04	2.7	900.0/sq mi (347.5/km^{2})
University Park	Town	Prince George's	2,454	2,548	−3.7%	0.50	1.3	4,908.0/sq mi (1,895.0/km^{2})
Upper Marlboro†	Town	Prince George's	652	631	+3.3%	0.40	1.0	1,630.0/sq mi (629.3/km^{2})
Vienna	Town	Dorchester	270	271	−0.4%	0.19	0.49	1,421.1/sq mi (548.7/km^{2})
Walkersville	Town	Frederick	6,156	5,800	+6.1%	4.35	11.3	1,415.2/sq mi (546.4/km^{2})
Washington Grove	Town	Montgomery	505	555	−9.0%	0.35	0.91	1,442.9/sq mi (557.1/km^{2})
Westernport	Town	Allegany	1,812	1,888	−4.0%	0.87	2.3	2,082.8/sq mi (804.2/km^{2})
Westminster†	City	Carroll	20,126	18,590	+8.3%	6.63	17.2	3,035.6/sq mi (1,172.1/km^{2})
Willards	Town	Wicomico	963	958	+0.5%	1.07	2.8	900.0/sq mi (347.5/km^{2})
Williamsport	Town	Washington	2,083	2,137	−2.5%	1.04	2.7	2,002.9/sq mi (773.3/km^{2})
Woodsboro	Town	Frederick	1,092	1,141	−4.3%	0.71	1.8	1,538.0/sq mi (593.8/km^{2})
Total	—	—	1,555,037	1,511,348	+2.9%	425.78	1,102.8	3,652.2/sq mi (1,410.1/km^{2})

== See also ==
- List of census-designated places in Maryland
- List of counties in Maryland
- Maryland Municipal League
