= Southern Gateway, Virginia =

Southern Gateway
- CDP
- Location in Stafford County and the state of Virginia.
- Coordinates: 38°20′42″N 77°30′13″W
- Country: United States
- State: Virginia
- County: Stafford

Population (2010)
  - Total: 2,805
- Time zone: UTC−5 (Eastern (EST))
  - Summer (DST): UTC−4 (EDT)
- ZIP codes: 22406
- FIPS code: 51-73760
- GNIS feature ID: 2584920

Southern Gateway is a census-designated place in Stafford County, Virginia. As of the 2020 census, Southern Gateway had a population of 3,133. The "Southern Gateway" is defined by the county as the area adjacent to U.S. Route 17 between Interstate 95 and Berea Road to the west.

== Demographics ==
Historical population
Census	Pop.	Note	%±
2010	2,805		—
2020	3,133		11.7%
U.S. Decennial Census; 2010 2020

=== 2020 census ===
As of the 2020 census, Southern Gateway had a population of 3,133. The median age was 30.8 years. 25.4% of residents were under the age of 18 and 10.4% were 65 years of age or older. For every 100 females there were 79.4 males, and for every 100 females age 18 and over there were 73.9 males age 18 and over.

99.2% of residents lived in urban areas, while 0.8% lived in rural areas.

There were 1,254 households in Southern Gateway, of which 32.6% had children under the age of 18 living in them. Of all households, 31.9% were married-couple households, 21.6% were households with a male householder and no spouse or partner present, and 36.9% were households with a female householder and no spouse or partner present. About 32.0% of all households were made up of individuals and 7.9% had someone living alone who was 65 years of age or older.

There were 1,328 housing units, of which 5.6% were vacant. The homeowner vacancy rate was 2.5% and the rental vacancy rate was 4.4%.

Racial composition as of the 2020 census
Race	Number	Percent
White	1,430	45.6%
Black or African American	960	30.6%
American Indian and Alaska Native	18	0.6%
Asian	140	4.5%
Native Hawaiian and Other Pacific Islander	6	0.2%
Some other race	151	4.8%
Two or more races	428	13.7%
Hispanic or Latino (of any race)	406	13.0%

=== 2010 census ===
Southern Gateway was first listed as a census-designated place in the 2010 U.S. census.
