= Ten Mile Creek, Maryland =

- Census-designated place
- Location within Maryland Location within the United States
- Coordinates: 39°13′36″N 77°18′37″W
- Country: United States of America
- State: Maryland
- County: Montgomery

Area
  - Total: 5.84 sq mi (15.12 km^{2})
  - Land: 5.79 sq mi (15.00 km^{2})
  - Water: 0.046 sq mi (0.12 km^{2})
- Elevation: 459 ft (140 m)

Population (2020)
  - Total: 1,012
  - Density: 174.7/sq mi (67.47/km^{2})
- Time zone: UTC-5 (Eastern (EST))
  - Summer (DST): UTC-4 (EDT)
- ZIP code: 20841 (Boyds)
- FIPS code: 24-77262
- GNIS feature ID: 2806304

Ten Mile Creek is a census-designated place in Montgomery County, Maryland, United States. First listed during the 2020 census, the community had a population of 1,012.

== Demographics ==
Historical population
Census	Pop.	Note	%±
2020	1,012		—
U.S. Decennial Census; 2020

Ten Mile Creek first appeared as a census designated place in the 2020 U.S. census.

=== Racial and ethnic composition ===
Ten Mile Creek CDP, Maryland – Racial and ethnic composition Note: the US Census treats Hispanic/Latino as an ethnic category. This table excludes Latinos from the racial categories and assigns them to a separate category. Hispanics/Latinos may be of any race.
Race / Ethnicity (NH = Non-Hispanic)	Pop 2020	% 2020
White alone (NH)	526	51.98%
Black or African American alone (NH)	206	20.36%
Native American or Alaska Native alone (NH)	2	0.20%
Asian alone (NH)	34	3.36%
Native Hawaiian or Pacific Islander alone (NH)	0	0.00%
Other race alone (NH)	1	0.10%
Mixed race or Multiracial (NH)	36	3.56%
Hispanic or Latino (any race)	207	20.45%
Total	1,012	100.00%
