= Mount Lena, Maryland =

- CDP
- Location of Mount Lena, Maryland
- Coordinates: 39°33′16″N 77°37′30″W
- Country: United States
- State: Maryland
- County: Washington

Area
  - Total: 1.25 sq mi (3.25 km^{2})
  - Land: 1.25 sq mi (3.25 km^{2})
  - Water: 0 sq mi (0.00 km^{2})
- Elevation: 702 ft (214 m)

Population (2020)
  - Total: 547
  - Density: 436.5/sq mi (168.54/km^{2})
- Time zone: UTC−5 (Eastern (EST))
  - Summer (DST): UTC−4 (EDT)
- ZIP code: 21713
- Area codes: 240 and 301
- FIPS code: 24-54125
- GNIS feature ID: 2389515

Mount Lena is a census-designated place (CDP) in Washington County, Maryland, United States. The population was 547 at the 2020 census.

== Geography ==
According to the United States Census Bureau, the CDP has a total area of 1.2 square miles (3.1 km^{2}), all land.

== Demographics ==
Historical population
| Census | Pop. | Note | %± |
|---|---|---|---|
| 2020 | 547 | | — |
U.S. Decennial Census

As of the census of 2000, there were 501 people, 199 households, and 154 families residing in the CDP. The population density was 403.0 inhabitants per square mile (155.6/km^{2}). There were 212 housing units at an average density of 170.5 per square mile (65.8/km^{2}). The racial makeup of the CDP was 98.80% White, 0.60% African American, 0.40% Native American and 0.20% Asian. Hispanic or Latino of any race were 0.20% of the population.

There were 199 households, out of which 26.1% had children under the age of 18 living with them, 65.8% were married couples living together, 6.5% had a female householder with no husband present, and 22.6% were non-families. 19.1% of all households were made up of individuals, and 10.6% had someone living alone who was 65 years of age or older. The average household size was 2.52 and the average family size was 2.84.

In the CDP, the population was spread out, with 19.6% under the age of 18, 6.2% from 18 to 24, 29.7% from 25 to 44, 26.3% from 45 to 64, and 18.2% who were 65 years of age or older. The median age was 41 years. For every 100 females, there were 101.2 males. For every 100 females age 18 and over, there were 99.5 males.

The median income for a household in the CDP was $41,932, and the median income for a family was $43,125. Males had a median income of $32,344 versus $26,477 for females. The per capita income for the CDP was $20,844. None of the families and 1.9% of the population were living below the poverty line, including no under eighteens and 12.0% of those over 64.
