= Reid, Maryland =

Unincorporated community in Maryland, United States

- CDP
- Location within Maryland Location within the United States
- Coordinates: 39°42′45″N 77°40′46″W
- Country: United States
- State: Maryland
- County: Washington

Area
  - Total: 0.12 sq mi (0.32 km^{2})
  - Land: 0.12 sq mi (0.32 km^{2})
  - Water: 0 sq mi (0.00 km^{2})
- Elevation: 584 ft (178 m)

Population (2020)
  - Total: 64
  - Density: 511.4/sq mi (197.47/km^{2})
- Time zone: UTC−5 (Eastern (EST))
  - Summer (DST): UTC−4 (EDT)
- ZIP code: 21742
- Area codes: 301, 240
- GNIS feature ID: 2583681

Reid is an unincorporated community and census-designated place in Washington County, Maryland, United States. Its population was 64 as of the 2020 census.

The Hagerstown and Frederick Railway served Reid.

== Geography ==
According to the U.S. Census Bureau, the community has an area of 0.125 square miles (0.32 km^{2}), all land.

== Demographics ==
Historical population
Census	Pop.	Note	%±
2010	54		—
2020	64		18.5%
U.S. Decennial Census
