= North Kensington, Maryland =

- Census-designated place
- Location of North Kensington, Maryland
- Coordinates: 39°02′21″N 77°04′20″W
- Country: United States
- State: Maryland
- County: Montgomery

Area
  - Total: 1.50 sq mi (3.88 km^{2})
  - Land: 1.49 sq mi (3.87 km^{2})
  - Water: 0.0039 sq mi (0.01 km^{2})
- Elevation: 338 ft (103 m)

Population (2020)
  - Total: 9,497
  - Density: 6,350.5/sq mi (2,451.93/km^{2})
- Time zone: UTC−5 (Eastern (EST))
  - Summer (DST): UTC−4 (EDT)
- FIPS code: 24-56712
- GNIS feature ID: 2389571

North Kensington is a census-designated place and an unincorporated area in Montgomery County, Maryland, United States. It had a population of 9,497 in 2020.

== Geography ==
As an unincorporated area, North Kensington's boundaries are not officially defined. North Kensington is, however, recognized by the United States Census Bureau and by the United States Geological Survey as a census-designated place.

According to the United States Census Bureau, the place has a total area of 1.5 square miles (3.9 km^{2}), all land.

This residential community is on the East and West sides of Connecticut Avenue, Southeast of Veirs Mill Road, and primarily North of University Blvd. The Montgomery County public schools serving this area are Newport Mill Middle School, Albert Einstein High School and Rockview Elementary School.

== Demographics ==
Historical population
Census	Pop.	Note	%±
1980	9,039		—
1990	8,607		−4.8%
2000	8,940		3.9%
2010	9,514		6.4%
2020	9,497		−0.2%
source: 2010–2020

=== 2020 census ===
As of the 2020 census, North Kensington had a population of 9,497. The median age was 40.4 years. 21.9% of residents were under the age of 18 and 16.5% of residents were 65 years of age or older. For every 100 females there were 95.6 males, and for every 100 females age 18 and over there were 92.4 males age 18 and over.

100.0% of residents lived in urban areas, while 0.0% lived in rural areas.

There were 3,424 households in North Kensington, of which 33.1% had children under the age of 18 living in them. Of all households, 50.3% were married-couple households, 16.0% were households with a male householder and no spouse or partner present, and 28.4% were households with a female householder and no spouse or partner present. About 26.3% of all households were made up of individuals and 12.2% had someone living alone who was 65 years of age or older.

There were 3,574 housing units, of which 4.2% were vacant. The homeowner vacancy rate was 1.0% and the rental vacancy rate was 3.1%.

Racial composition as of the 2020 census
Race	Number	Percent
White	4,803	50.6%
Black or African American	1,114	11.7%
American Indian and Alaska Native	66	0.7%
Asian	958	10.1%
Native Hawaiian and Other Pacific Islander	7	0.1%
Some other race	1,268	13.4%
Two or more races	1,281	13.5%
Hispanic or Latino (of any race)	2,432	25.6%

=== 2000 census ===
At the 2000 census there were 8,940 people, 3,527 households, and 2,197 families living in the area. The population density was 5,799.5 inhabitants per square mile (2,239.2/km^{2}). There were 3,631 housing units at an average density of 2,355.5 per square mile (909.5/km^{2}). The racial makeup of the area was 67.00% White, 13.31% African American, 0.39% Native American, 8.66% Asian, 0.07% Pacific Islander, 6.33% from other races, and 4.24% from two or more races. Hispanic or Latino of any race were 15.08%.

Of the 3,527 households 25.8% had children under the age of 18 living with them, 47.8% were married couples living together, 11.0% had a female householder with no husband present, and 37.7% were non-families. 29.8% of households were one person and 10.9% were one person aged 65 or older. The average household size was 2.47 and the average family size was 3.07.

The age distribution was 21.0% under the age of 18, 6.3% from 18 to 24, 32.5% from 25 to 44, 23.7% from 45 to 64, and 16.6% 65 or older. The median age was 39 years. For every 100 females, there were 90.5 males. For every 100 females age 18 and over, there were 85.4 males.

The median household income was $65,144 and the median family income was $75,554. Males had a median income of $46,631 versus $40,609 for females. The per capita income for the area was $28,816. About 3.7% of families and 6.3% of the population were below the poverty line, including 8.4% of those under age 18 and 8.1% of those age 65 or over.
