= Mount Briar, Maryland =

Unincorporated community in Maryland, United States

- CDP
- Location within Maryland Location within the United States
- Coordinates: 39°26′33″N 77°41′14″W
- Country: United States
- State: Maryland
- County: Washington

Area
  - Total: 0.62 sq mi (1.61 km^{2})
  - Land: 0.62 sq mi (1.61 km^{2})
  - Water: 0 sq mi (0.00 km^{2})
- Elevation: 551 ft (168 m)

Population (2020)
  - Total: 170
  - Density: 272.9/sq mi (105.38/km^{2})
- Time zone: UTC−5 (Eastern (EST))
  - Summer (DST): UTC−4 (EDT)
- ZIP code: 21756
- Area codes: 240 & 301
- GNIS feature ID: 2630704

Mount Briar is an unincorporated community and census-designated place in Washington County, Maryland, United States. Its population was 160 as of the 2010 census.

== Geography ==
According to the U.S. Census Bureau, the community has an area of 0.623 square miles (1.61 km^{2}), all land.

== Demographics ==
Historical population
Census	Pop.	Note	%±
2020	170		—
U.S. Decennial Census
