= Bagtown, Maryland =

Unincorporated community in Maryland, United States

- Unincorporated community
- Location within Maryland Location within the United States
- Coordinates: 39°34′54″N 77°36′38″W
- Country: United States
- State: Maryland
- County: Washington

Area
  - Total: 0.54 sq mi (1.41 km^{2})
  - Land: 0.54 sq mi (1.41 km^{2})
  - Water: 0 sq mi (0.00 km^{2})
- Elevation: 689 ft (210 m)

Population (2020)
  - Total: 321
  - Density: 588.3/sq mi (227.14/km^{2})
- Time zone: UTC−5 (Eastern (EST))
  - Summer (DST): UTC−4 (EDT)
- Area codes: 301, 240
- FIPS code: 24-03514
- GNIS feature ID: 2583574

Bagtown is an unincorporated community and census-designated place in Washington County, Maryland, United States. Its population was 333 as of the 2010 census.

== Geography ==
According to the U.S. Census Bureau, the community has an area of 0.546 square miles (1.41 km^{2}), all land.

== Demographics ==
Historical population
Census	Pop.	Note	%±
2020	321		—
U.S. Decennial Census
