= Tilghmanton, Maryland =

Unincorporated community in Maryland, United States

- CDP
- Location within Maryland Location within the United States
- Coordinates: 39°31′44″N 77°44′49″W
- Country: United States
- State: Maryland
- County: Washington

Area
  - Total: 0.46 sq mi (1.20 km^{2})
  - Land: 0.46 sq mi (1.20 km^{2})
  - Water: 0 sq mi (0.00 km^{2})
- Elevation: 492 ft (150 m)

Population (2020)
  - Total: 423
  - Density: 911.6/sq mi (351.97/km^{2})
- Time zone: UTC−5 (Eastern (EST))
  - Summer (DST): UTC−4 (EDT)
- Area codes: 240 & 301
- GNIS feature ID: 2583694

Tilghmanton is an unincorporated community and census-designated place in Washington County, Maryland, United States. Its population was 465 as of the 2010 census.

== Geography ==
According to the U.S. Census Bureau, the community has an area of 0.464 square miles (1.20 km^{2}), all land.

== Demographics ==
Historical population
Census	Pop.	Note	%±
2020	423		—
U.S. Decennial Census
