= Bakersville, Maryland =

Unincorporated community in Maryland, United States

- Unincorporated community
- Location within Maryland Location within the United States
- Coordinates: 39°30′53″N 77°45′25″W
- Country: United States
- State: Maryland
- County: Washington

Area
  - Total: 0.050 sq mi (0.13 km^{2})
  - Land: 0.050 sq mi (0.13 km^{2})
  - Water: 0 sq mi (0.00 km^{2})
- Elevation: 427 ft (130 m)

Population (2020)
  - Total: 30
  - Density: 590.4/sq mi (227.97/km^{2})
- Time zone: UTC−5 (Eastern (EST))
  - Summer (DST): UTC−4 (EDT)
- Area codes: 301, 240
- GNIS feature ID: 2583575

Bakersville is an unincorporated community and census-designated place in Washington County, Maryland, United States. Its population was 30 as of the 2010 census.

== History ==
Bakersville is an historic rural crossroads community located where one of the earliest east–west roads through western Maryland crossed the main north–south road from the Sharpsburg area. The region known as Carey's Crossroads for a then prominent landowner George Carey, had become central to the mostly German settlement taking place in southeast Washington County during the mid to late 18th century. The immigrants followed various denominations of the Christian faith and about 1800 joined to erect a union meeting house to be shared by the different groups, primarily Lutheran, German Reformed and Methodist Episcopal. The church and graveyard were built on land provided by George Carey (Garrick). In 1823 the group had outgrown the log church and a stone sanctuary and schoolhouse was built to replace it. The population had grown enough for the churches to separate by 1854 and Salem Lutheran Church was built as it stands today. The cemetery of Salem Lutheran holds the remains of many prominent early residents. Bakersville was once home to a store, post office, doctor's office and grist mill. 19th century census records list many C&O Canal workers and boatmen in the village and surrounding area. Today, Salem Evangelical Lutheran Church and cemetery is the only public entity remaining along with the several remaining older homes making up the rural village.

== Geography ==
According to the U.S. Census Bureau, the community has an area of 0.051 square miles (0.13 km^{2}), all land.

== Demographics ==
Historical population
Census	Pop.	Note	%±
2020	30		—
U.S. Decennial Census
