= Edgemont, Maryland =

Unincorporated community in Maryland, United States

- CDP
- Location within Maryland Location within the United States
- Coordinates: 39°40′36″N 77°32′49″W
- Country: United States
- State: Maryland
- County: Washington

Area
  - Total: 0.53 sq mi (1.37 km^{2})
  - Land: 0.53 sq mi (1.37 km^{2})
  - Water: 0 sq mi (0.00 km^{2})
- Elevation: 840 ft (260 m)

Population (2020)
  - Total: 218
  - Density: 411.0/sq mi (158.68/km^{2})
- Time zone: UTC-5 (Eastern (EST))
  - Summer (DST): UTC-4 (EDT)
- ZIP code: 21783
- Area codes: 240 & 301
- GNIS feature ID: 2583611

Edgemont is an unincorporated community and census-designated place in Washington County, Maryland, United States. Its population was 231 as of the 2010 census.

== Geography ==
According to the U.S. Census Bureau, the community has an area of 0.530 square miles (1.37 km^{2}), all land.

== Demographics ==
Historical population
Census	Pop.	Note	%±
2020	218		—
U.S. Decennial Census
