= Middleburg, Washington County, Maryland =

Unincorporated community in Maryland, United States

Middlesburg, Maryland
- Census-designated place
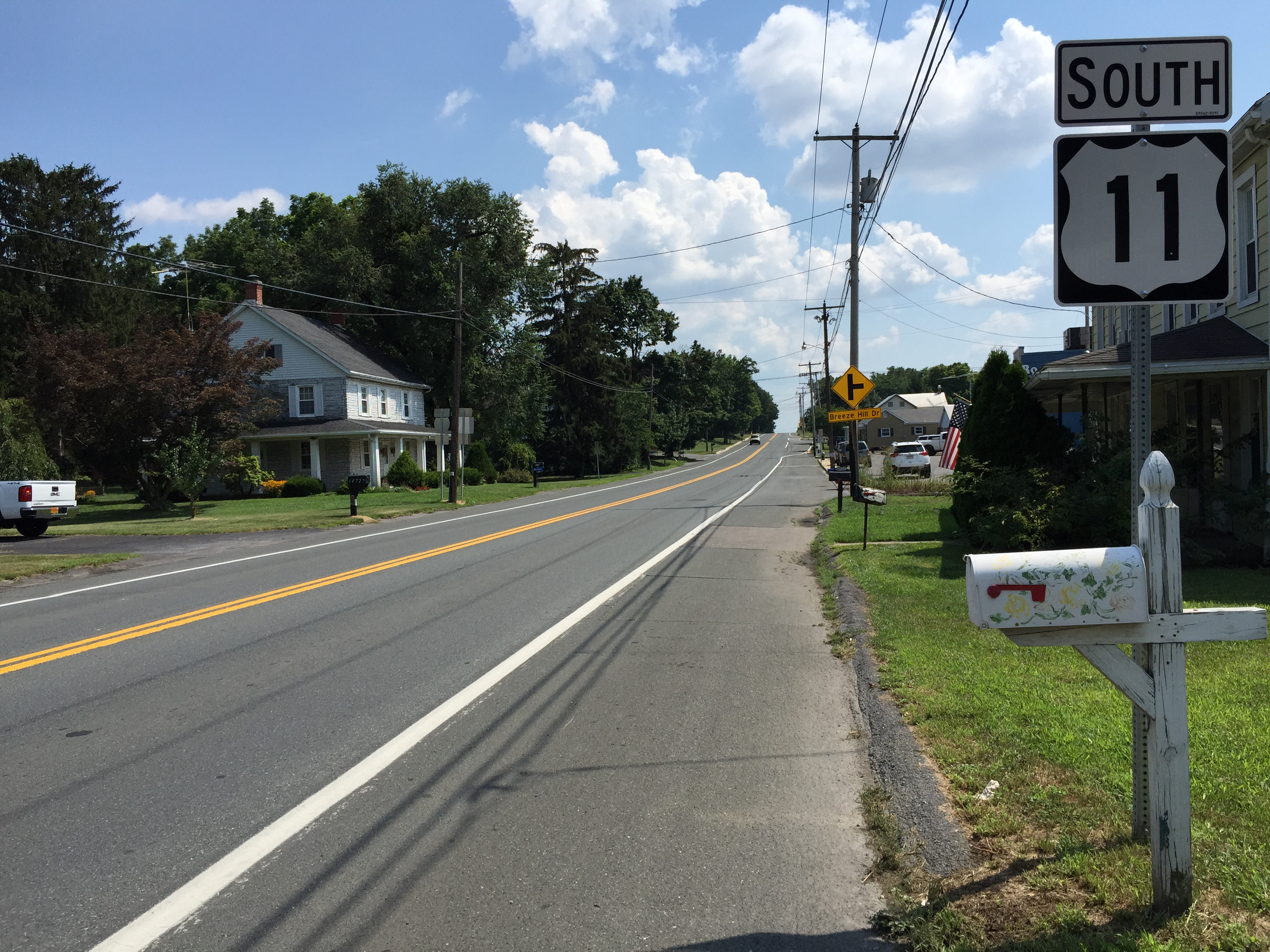
- US 11 southbound through Middleburg

- Location within Maryland Location within the United States
- Coordinates: 39°43′04″N 77°43′26″W
- Country: United States
- State: Maryland
- County: Washington

Area
  - Total: 0.097 sq mi (0.25 km^{2})
  - Land: 0.097 sq mi (0.25 km^{2})
  - Water: 0 sq mi (0.00 km^{2})
- Elevation: 738 ft (225 m)

Population (2020)
  - Total: 73
  - Density: 753/sq mi (290.8/km^{2})
- Time zone: UTC−5 (Eastern (EST))
  - Summer (DST): UTC−4 (EDT)
- Area codes: 240 & 301
- FIPS code: 24-52225
- GNIS feature ID: 2583657

Middleburg is an unincorporated community and census-designated place in Washington County, Maryland, United States. Its population was 70 as of the 2010 census.

== Geography ==
According to the U.S. Census Bureau, the community has an area of 0.097 square miles (0.25 km^{2}), all land.

== Demographics ==
Historical population
Census	Pop.	Note	%±
2020	73		—
U.S. Decennial Census
