= Robinwood, Maryland =

- CDP
- Coordinates: 39°37′23″N 77°39′45″W
- Country: United States
- State: Maryland
- County: Washington

Area
  - Total: 3.81 sq mi (9.86 km^{2})
  - Land: 3.81 sq mi (9.86 km^{2})
  - Water: 0 sq mi (0.00 km^{2})
- Elevation: 587 ft (179 m)

Population (2020)
  - Total: 7,397
  - Density: 1,944.0/sq mi (750.58/km^{2})
- Time zone: UTC−5 (Eastern (EST))
  - Summer (DST): UTC−4 (EDT)
- FIPS code: 24-67000
- GNIS feature ID: 2389763

Robinwood is a census-designated place (CDP) in Washington County, Maryland, United States. The population was 4,731 at the 2000 census. It is a part of the Hagerstown Metropolitan Area. Robinwood is home to Hagerstown Community College.

== Geography ==
According to the United States Census Bureau, the CDP has a total area of 3.8 square miles (9.8 km^{2}), all land.

== Demographics ==
Historical population
Census	Pop.	Note	%±
2020	7,397		—
U.S. Decennial Census

=== 2020 census ===
As of the 2020 census, Robinwood had a population of 7,397. The median age was 38.8 years. 23.0% of residents were under the age of 18 and 18.3% of residents were 65 years of age or older. For every 100 females there were 87.1 males, and for every 100 females age 18 and over there were 85.7 males age 18 and over.

97.2% of residents lived in urban areas, while 2.8% lived in rural areas.

There were 2,906 households in Robinwood, of which 30.3% had children under the age of 18 living in them. Of all households, 44.7% were married-couple households, 16.9% were households with a male householder and no spouse or partner present, and 30.4% were households with a female householder and no spouse or partner present. About 29.6% of all households were made up of individuals and 15.6% had someone living alone who was 65 years of age or older.

There were 3,104 housing units, of which 6.4% were vacant. The homeowner vacancy rate was 2.2% and the rental vacancy rate was 7.7%.

Racial composition as of the 2020 census
Race	Number	Percent
White	4,947	66.9%
Black or African American	1,135	15.3%
American Indian and Alaska Native	11	0.1%
Asian	417	5.6%
Native Hawaiian and Other Pacific Islander	8	0.1%
Some other race	218	2.9%
Two or more races	661	8.9%
Hispanic or Latino (of any race)	545	7.4%

=== 2000 census ===
As of the census of 2000, there were 4,731 people, 1,918 households, and 1,294 families residing in the CDP. The population density was 1,254.2 inhabitants per square mile (484.2/km^{2}). There were 1,985 housing units at an average density of 526.2 per square mile (203.2/km^{2}). The racial makeup of the CDP was 87.93% White, 6.34% African American, 0.19% Native American, 2.64% Asian, 0.19% Pacific Islander, 0.99% from other races, and 1.71% from two or more races. Hispanic or Latino of any race were 2.22% of the population.

There were 1,918 households, out of which 32.5% had children under the age of 18 living with them, 55.6% were married couples living together, 8.7% had a female householder with no husband present, and 32.5% were non-families. 25.5% of all households were made up of individuals, and 9.7% had someone living alone who was 65 years of age or older. The average household size was 2.45 and the average family size was 2.97.

In the CDP, the population was spread out, with 25.0% under the age of 18, 8.3% from 18 to 24, 29.8% from 25 to 44, 24.0% from 45 to 64, and 12.9% who were 65 years of age or older. The median age was 36 years. For every 100 females, there were 91.5 males. For every 100 females age 18 and over, there were 89.6 males.

The median income for a household in the CDP was $50,615, and the median income for a family was $62,965. Males had a median income of $38,000 versus $30,404 for females. The per capita income for the CDP was $26,608. About 2.6% of families and 6.3% of the population were below the poverty line, including 6.4% of those under age 18 and 14.8% of those age 65 or over.
