= Paramount-Long Meadow, Maryland =

- CDP
- Location of Paramount-Long Meadow, Maryland
- Coordinates: 39°40′47″N 77°41′32″W
- Country: United States
- State: Maryland
- County: Washington

Area
  - Total: 2.18 sq mi (5.65 km^{2})
  - Land: 2.18 sq mi (5.65 km^{2})
  - Water: 0 sq mi (0.00 km^{2})
- Elevation: 610 ft (190 m)

Population (2020)
  - Total: 2,658
  - Density: 1,218.1/sq mi (470.33/km^{2})
- Time zone: UTC−5 (Eastern (EST))
  - Summer (DST): UTC−4 (EDT)
- ZIP code: 21742
- Area codes: 240 and 301
- FIPS code: 24-59787
- GNIS feature ID: 2389639

Paramount-Long Meadow is a census-designated place (CDP) in Washington County, Maryland, United States. The population was 2,722 at the 2000 census.

== Geography ==
According to the United States Census Bureau, the CDP has a total area of 2.8 square miles (7.3 km^{2}), all land.

== History ==
The region of Washington County Maryland known today as Long Meadow was originally a large mostly level area covering close to twenty square-miles of agriculturally desirable land west of Antietam Creek. One of the earliest transportation routes through the colony passed near this region, crossing the upper branches of Antietam Creek before turning southwest. This was a route preferred by many of the early German and Swiss immigrant settlers to the Hagerstown area from central Pennsylvania. The name Long Meadow derives from a land grant issued to Thomas Cresap (Sr.) in 1739. Cresap's Long Meadow property would be transferred to investor Daniel Dulaney of Annapolis in 1746 and enlarged from 550 acres to 2131 acres. "Long Meadow" and the region surrounding it would remain mostly agricultural until the mid-20th century. In 1958 the name was revived with the opening of the region's first purpose-built shopping area, "Long Meadow Shopping Center" between Northern Avenue and Potomac Avenue / Leitersburg Pike.

== Demographics ==
Historical population
Census	Pop.	Note	%±
2020	2,658		—
U.S. Decennial Census

=== 2020 census ===
As of the 2020 census, Paramount-Long Meadow had a population of 2,658. The median age was 48.0 years. 19.8% of residents were under the age of 18 and 24.7% of residents were 65 years of age or older. For every 100 females there were 89.7 males, and for every 100 females age 18 and over there were 90.2 males age 18 and over.

88.5% of residents lived in urban areas, while 11.5% lived in rural areas.

There were 1,072 households in Paramount-Long Meadow, of which 29.1% had children under the age of 18 living in them. Of all households, 61.2% were married-couple households, 10.0% were households with a male householder and no spouse or partner present, and 24.3% were households with a female householder and no spouse or partner present. About 21.4% of all households were made up of individuals and 12.9% had someone living alone who was 65 years of age or older.

There were 1,135 housing units, of which 5.6% were vacant. The homeowner vacancy rate was 2.9% and the rental vacancy rate was 9.0%.

Racial composition as of the 2020 census
Race	Number	Percent
White	2,195	82.6%
Black or African American	153	5.8%
American Indian and Alaska Native	4	0.2%
Asian	57	2.1%
Native Hawaiian and Other Pacific Islander	2	0.1%
Some other race	49	1.8%
Two or more races	198	7.4%
Hispanic or Latino (of any race)	141	5.3%

=== 2000 census ===
As of the census of 2000, there were 2,722 people, 985 households, and 778 families residing in the CDP. The population density was 980.5 inhabitants per square mile (378.6/km^{2}). There were 1,010 housing units at an average density of 363.8 per square mile (140.5/km^{2}). The racial makeup of the CDP was 93.64% White, 2.46% African American, 0.18% Native American, 2.42% Asian, 0.55% from other races, and 0.73% from two or more races. Hispanic or Latino of any race were 0.84% of the population.

There were 985 households, out of which 32.0% had children under the age of 18 living with them, 69.4% were married couples living together, 7.2% had a female householder with no husband present, and 21.0% were non-families. 18.3% of all households were made up of individuals, and 8.6% had someone living alone who was 65 years of age or older. The average household size was 2.59 and the average family size was 2.95.

In the CDP, the population was spread out, with 23.2% under the age of 18, 5.3% from 18 to 24, 21.1% from 25 to 44, 28.7% from 45 to 64, and 21.7% who were 65 years of age or older. The median age was 45 years. For every 100 females, there were 90.9 males. For every 100 females age 18 and over, there were 86.8 males.

The median income for a household in the CDP was $71,591, and the median income for a family was $82,072. Males had a median income of $58,015 versus $27,500 for females. The per capita income for the CDP was $29,309. About 2.1% of families and 1.5% of the population were below the poverty line, including none of those under age 18 and 4.2% of those age 65 or over.
