= Kemps Mill, Maryland =

Unincorporated community in Maryland, United States

- Unincorporated community
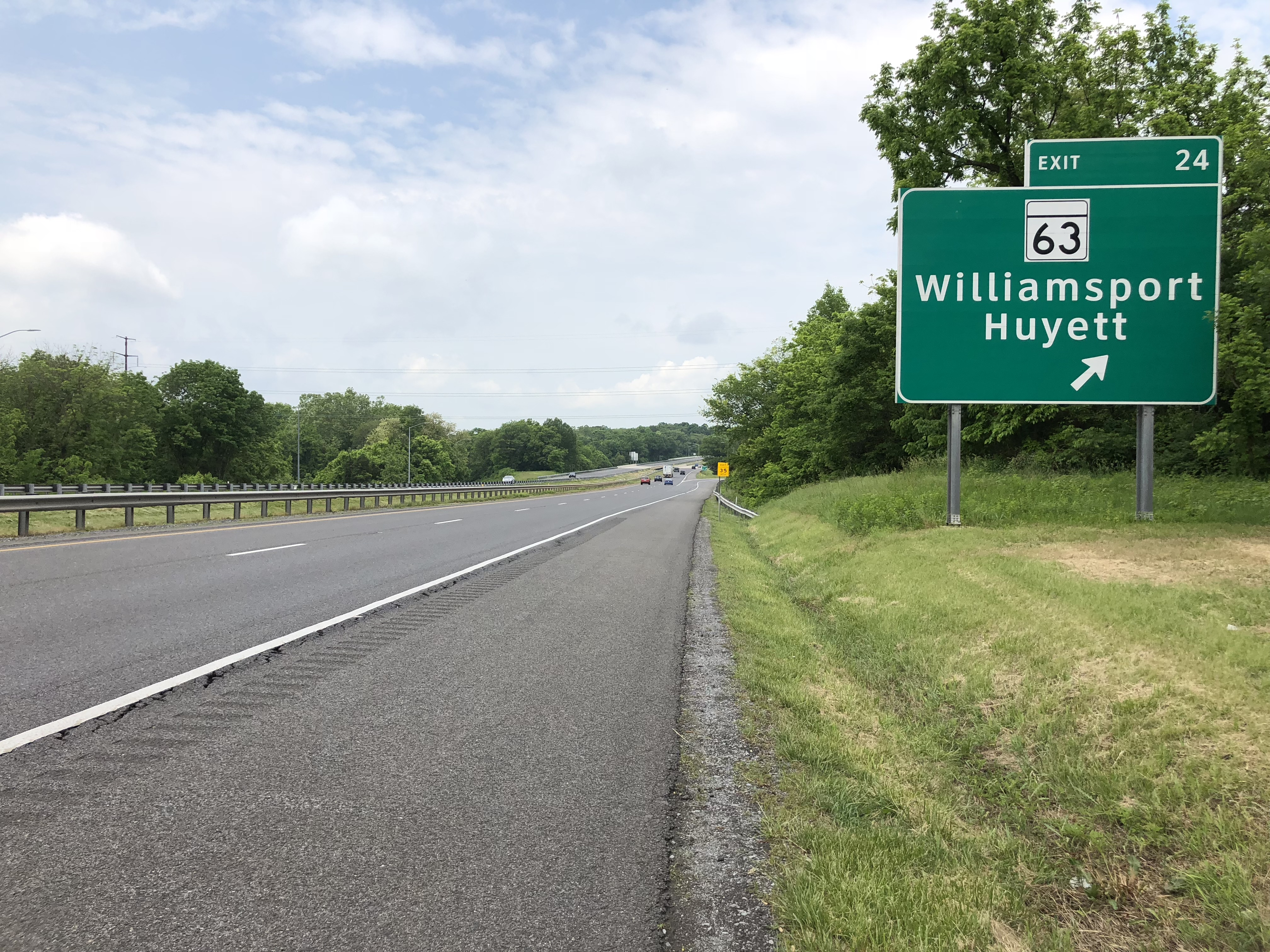
- I-70 in Kemps Mill

- Location within Maryland Location within the United States
- Coordinates: 39°37′30″N 77°48′50″W
- Country: United States
- State: Maryland
- County: Washington

Area
  - Total: 0.26 sq mi (0.67 km^{2})
  - Land: 0.26 sq mi (0.67 km^{2})
  - Water: 0 sq mi (0.00 km^{2})
- Elevation: 367 ft (112 m)

Population (2020)
  - Total: 117
  - Density: 452.4/sq mi (174.68/km^{2})
- Time zone: UTC-5 (Eastern (EST))
  - Summer (DST): UTC-4 (EDT)
- Area codes: 240 & 301
- GNIS feature ID: 2583644

Kemps Mill is an unincorporated community and census-designated place in Washington County, Maryland, United States. Its population was 126 as of the 2010 census. It is named after a 1739 built mill structure which still stands in 2020 and has operated under a variety of names through almost three centuries. The mill dam creates a slackwater which is popular for fishing and other recreational water activities. The mill is several miles above the mouth of the Conococheague Creek which flows to the Potomac River at a location where Native American trading posts existed for many centuries prior to European settlement in the area.

== Geography ==
According to the U.S. Census Bureau, the community has an area of 0.258 square miles (0.67 km^{2}), all land.

== Demographics ==
Historical population
Census	Pop.	Note	%±
2020	117		—
U.S. Decennial Census
