= Tall Timbers, St. Mary's County, Maryland =

Tall Timbers, Maryland
- Census-designated place
- Location within Maryland Location within the United States
- Coordinates: 38°10′18″N 76°32′42″W
- Country: United States
- State: Maryland
- County: St. Mary's

Area
  - Total: 1.52 sq mi (3.94 km^{2})
  - Land: 1.37 sq mi (3.56 km^{2})
  - Water: 0.15 sq mi (0.38 km^{2})

Population (2020)
  - Total: 451
  - Density: 328.0/sq mi (126.63/km^{2})
- Time zone: UTC−5 (Eastern (EST))
  - Summer (DST): UTC−4 (EDT)
- FIPS code: 24-76675

Tall Timbers is an unincorporated community and census-designated place in St. Mary's County, Maryland, United States.

== Demographics ==
Historical population
Census	Pop.	Note	%±
2020	451		—
U.S. Decennial Census
