= Jugtown, Maryland =

Unincorporated community in Maryland, United States

- Unincorporated community
- Location within Maryland Location within the United States
- Coordinates: 39°36′51″N 77°35′39″W
- Country: United States
- State: Maryland
- County: Washington

Area
  - Total: 0.33 sq mi (0.86 km^{2})
  - Land: 0.33 sq mi (0.86 km^{2})
  - Water: 0 sq mi (0.00 km^{2})
- Elevation: 787 ft (240 m)

Population (2020)
  - Total: 168
  - Density: 503.4/sq mi (194.35/km^{2})
- Time zone: UTC-5 (Eastern (EST))
  - Summer (DST): UTC-4 (EDT)
- Area codes: 240 & 301
- GNIS feature ID: 2583643

Jugtown is an unincorporated community and census-designated place in Washington County, Maryland, United States. Its population was 204 as of the 2010 census.

== Geography ==
According to the U.S. Census Bureau, the community has an area of 0.334 square miles (0.87 km^{2}), all land.

== Demographics ==
Historical population
| Census | Pop. | Note | %± |
|---|---|---|---|
| 2020 | 168 | | — |
U.S. Decennial Census
