= Maryland Route 858 =

State highway in Maryland, United States

Maryland Route 858

Route information
- Maintained by MDSHA
- Length: 1.00 mi (1.61 km)
- Existed: 1963–present

Major junctions
- West end: MD 67 in Rohrersville
- East end: MD 67 near Rohrersville

Location
- Country: United States
- State: Maryland
- Counties: Washington

Highway system
- Maryland highway system; Interstate; US; State; Scenic Byways
| ← MD 856 | → MD 863 |

Maryland Route 858 (MD 858) is a collection of unsigned state highways in the U.S. state of Maryland. These four highways are old segments of MD 67 between Rohrersville and Boonsboro in southeastern Washington County. These highways were designated when MD 67 was relocated in the early 1960s. The longest segment is MD 858F, which runs exactly 1 mile (1.6 km) between a pair of intersections with MD 67 in Rohrersville. In addition to the four existing highways, there are several county-maintained segments of old MD 67 between Rohrersville and Boonsboro and at Gapland, Brownsville, and Weverton south of Rohrersville.

== Route description ==
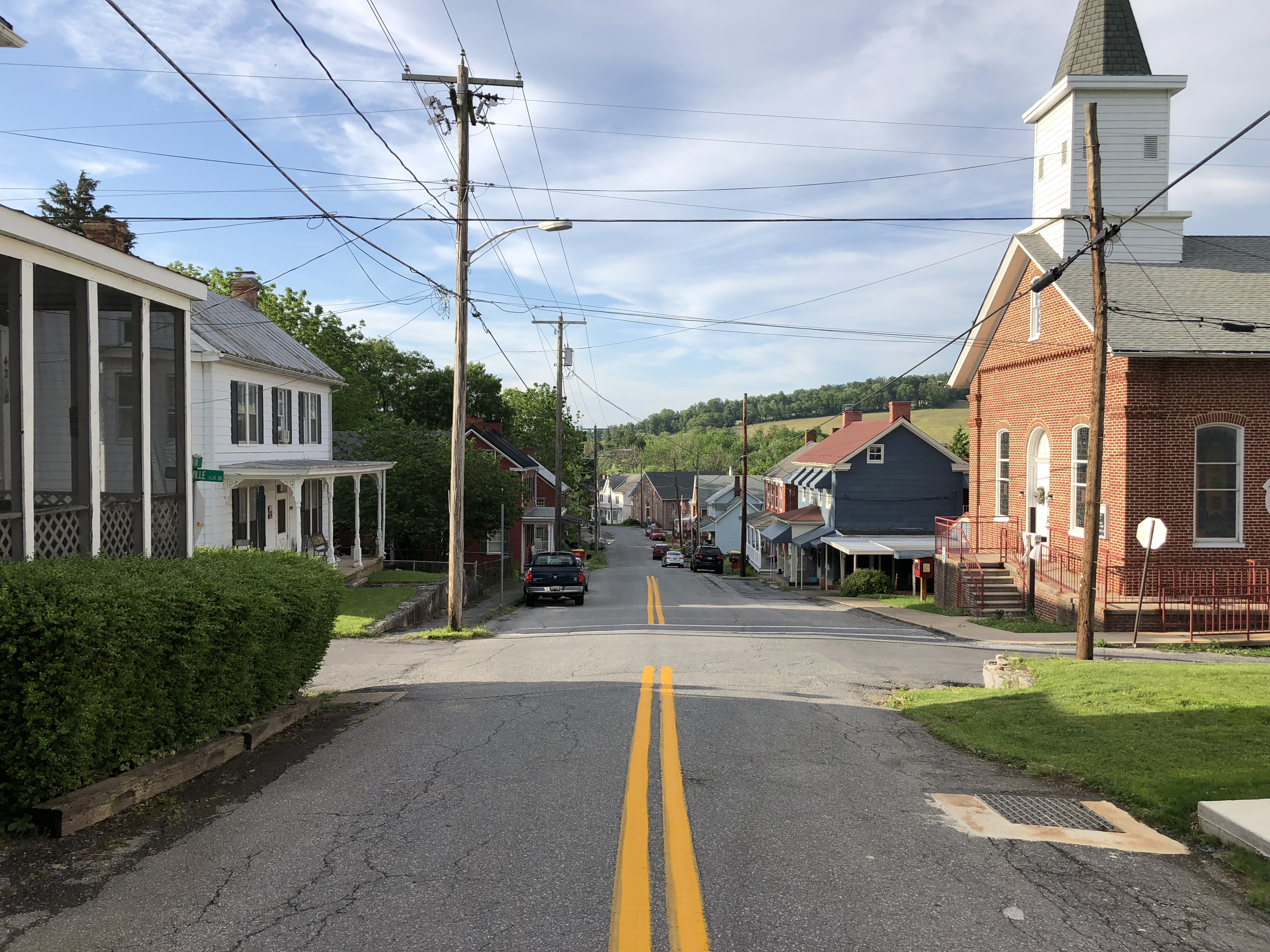
View north along MD 858 in Rohrersville

MD 858F begins at an intersection with MD 67 (Rohrersville Road) on the southern edge of the village of Rohrersville. The highway heads north as two-lane undivided Main Street. MD 858F intersects Rohrersville School Road in the center of the village and Hog Maw Road at the north end. From the latter road, the highway turns east and crosses Little Antietam Creek. MD 858F curves north again and intersects Millbrook Road and unnamed MD 67A, which continues north to a dead end along Main Street's direction, then curves east and reaches its northern terminus at MD 67.

There are three other extant segments of MD 858:

- MD 858A is the designation for the unnamed 0.02-mile (0.032 km) access road from U.S. Route 40 Alternate (US 40 Alternate) to the Maryland State Highway Administration's Boonsboro shop and salt dome. This piece of highway lies just east of MD 67's present northern terminus.
- MD 858E is the designation for the 0.29-mile (0.47 km) portion of Woodstock Lane from Park Hall Road north to road end paralleling the northbound side of MD 67 north of Rohrersville. Woodstock Lane continues south from Park Hall Road to a dead end south of Locust Grove Road.
- MD 858G is the designation for an unnamed 0.07-mile (0.11 km) section of old alignment of MD 67 south of Rohrersville. MD 858G once continued south 0.22 miles (0.35 km) to an intersection with Trego Road.

== History ==
MD 858 comprises several segments of the old alignment of MD 67. That highway was constructed as a macadam road on Main Street through Rohrersville by 1921. The macadam road was extended north to Boonsboro in 1925 and 1926. Construction began on MD 67 from Rohrersville to Gapland in 1926 and was completed as a macadam road in 1928. The highway was extended through Brownsville to north of Weverton as a concrete road in 1929 and 1930. The southern end of pavement remained north of Weverton until the modern road was extended south as a macadam road through Weverton to US 340 in 1934 and 1935. Extensive relocation and reconstruction work on MD 67 from Boonsboro to Gapland was underway by 1959. The work was finished in 1963, resulting in eight bypassed stretches of old road. In addition to the four existing segments of MD 858, bypassed from north to south were Appletown Road on the southbound and then northbound side of MD 67 near Boonsboro, Mount Carmel Church Road on the southbound side of the state highway north of Rohrersville, and Gapland Road on the southbound side of MD 67 at Gapland. MD 67 was relocated at its southern end concurrent with the construction of its trumpet interchange with US 340 in 1969. This work left behind Weverton Road east of MD 67 through Weverton. The final segment of old MD 67 to be bypassed was Boteler Road on the east side of the state highway through Brownsville, which MD 67 bypassed by 1978.

== Junction list ==
This junction list is for MD 858F, which is entirely in Rohrersville, Washington County.

| mi | km | Destinations | Notes |
|---|---|---|---|
| 0.00 | 0.00 | MD 67 (Rohrersville Road) – Weverton | Southern terminus |
| 1.00 | 1.61 | MD 67 (Rohrersville Road) – Boonsboro | Northern terminus |
1.000 mi = 1.609 km; 1.000 km = 0.621 mi
