= Music of Maryland =

Maryland is a U.S. state with a musical heritage that dates back to the Native Americans of the region and includes contributions to colonial era music, modern American popular and folk music. The music of Maryland includes a number of popular musicians, folk styles and a documented music history that dates to the colonial archives on music from Annapolis, an important source in research on colonial music. Famous modern musicians from Maryland range from jazz singer Billie Holiday to pop punk band Good Charlotte, and include a wide array of popular styles.

Modern Maryland is home to many well-regarded music venues, including the Baltimore Symphony Orchestra and Baltimore Opera, and the Peabody Institute's Conservatory of Music. Baltimore, the largest city in the state, is home to many important local venues, such as the Red Room, a center for the local experimental music scene, and the house nightspot Club Choices. Outside of Baltimore, Frederick's Weinberg Center for the Arts and Rockville's Strathmore are also important regional venues. The Merriweather Post Pavilion and 1st Mariner Arena host most of the largest concerts in the area. Since HFStival ended its successful run in 2006, Virgin Festival has taken over as one of the most popular summer festivals on the east coast since its inaugural year in 2006.

== Institutions ==
Most of the major musical organizations in Baltimore were founded by musicians who trained at the Peabody Institute's Conservatory of Music. These include Baltimore Choral Arts and the Baltimore Opera, as well as the Baltimore Symphony Orchestra (BSO). The Baltimore Symphony Orchestra formed in 1916 and was the only orchestra in the country to operate as a branch of the city's government. In 1942, the orchestra was reorganized as a private institution. The Orchestra claims that Joseph Meyerhoff, President of the Orchestra beginning in 1965, and his music director, Sergiu Comissiona, began the modern history of the BSO and "ensured the creation of an institution, which has become the undisputed leader of the arts community throughout the State of Maryland".

Aside from the prominent Baltimore Symphony, Maryland is also home to several other institutions. The Annapolis Symphony Orchestra, founded in 1962, is a well-known organization that has hosted guests like Cuban violinist Guillermo Perich and Charlie Byrd; the Annapolis Orchestra inspired composer David Ott to create the Annapolis Overture, which debuted in 1995. The Rohrersville Cornet Band, part of Maryland's cornet band heritage, claims to be the oldest continually performing community band in the state, having been founded in 1837; it now performs in a dedicated music hall in Rohrersville. The Maryland Classic Youth Orchestras (MCYO) was formed in the 1946 to "nurture, develop and advance young talented musicians in a quality orchestral program". Beginning in 1964, the Orchestras began to offer new programs, such as a summer camp that eventually became the Maryland Center for the Arts.

== Venues and festivals ==
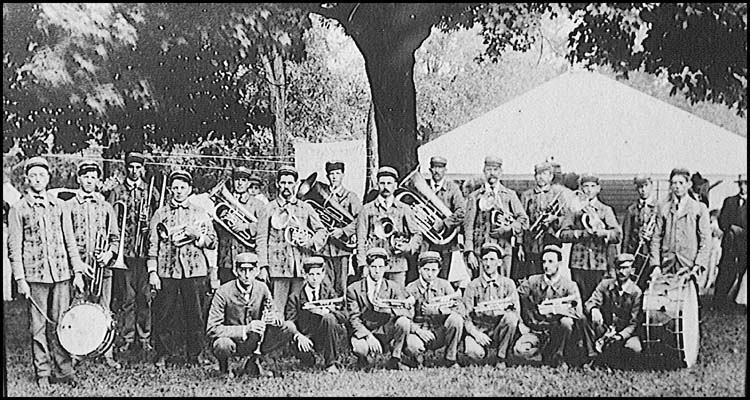
The Rohrersville Cornet Band is the oldest community band in continuous service in the state

The largest music venue in Maryland is the Merriweather Post Pavilion, opened in 1967 and designed by architect Frank Gehry to avoid disturbing as much as possible the surrounding Symphony Woods; it is an outdoor performance area, home to most of the largest concerts that come through the area. In the 1990s and early 2000s, HFStival, held by the WHFS radio station, established itself as an extremely popular annual festival, and became a major draw across the Baltimore-Washington metropolitan area. Since 2006, Virgin Festival has established itself as a hugely popular festival annually held at Pimlico Race Course, drawing in a variety of popular acts. The Takoma Park Folk Festival is also well known among folk music aficionados, and has been held annually since 1978 in Takoma Park, Maryland.

Baltimore is home to several important concert spaces, including the Meyerhoff Symphony Hall, Concordia Hall and the Lyric Opera House. The Meyerhoff is home to the Baltimore Symphony Orchestra. Concordia Hall is a long-standing venue, founded in 1867 by German musical societies, which were then a large portion of Baltimore's population. The Lyric Opera House, founded in 1894, is another important Baltimore music venue; it has hosted many of the most famous performers and public speakers to come to Baltimore. Smaller Hardcore and Punk acts play at the Charm City Art Space.

The city of Frederick is home to the Weinberg Centre for the Arts, which shows various kinds of theatrical and musical productions. The Weinberg was originally a large movie theater called the Tivoli, opened in 1926; the Tivoli was destroyed in a flood in 1976, and was reopened as the Weinberg Center two years later. North Bethesda's Strathmore opened in 1976, and is now a home for numerous programs, including the largest of its music venues, the Music Center at Strathmore; the Strathmore has hosted well-known musicians and composers like the cellist Steven Honigberg, pianist Christopher Taylor, jazz singers Nnenna Freelon and Luciana Souza and composers Virgil Thomson and Gunther Schuller, as well as DC-area cult acts like the founder of Go-go, Chuck Brown, and the reunited punk band The Slickee Boys.

== History ==
Indigenous peoples created the first music in what became Maryland. The documented music history of Maryland begins during the colonial era, in the 18th century. The capital city of Annapolis was a major center for music during the colonial era; the city's Tuesday Club left behind documentation of musical life in Annapolis, one of the most complete sources for musical knowledge about that era in the United States. The larger growing port city of Baltimore 20 miles farther north eventually replaced Annapolis as a center for music in Maryland, and eventually became home to most of the prominent music institutions in the state, especially the Peabody Institute, founded by George Peabody in 1857. Later still, Baltimore's Pennsylvania Avenue, northwest of downtown, became a very well known home for African American music, especially jazz, while Maryland began producing popular musicians like The Orioles. In modern times, Maryland has been a home for styles including emo and hardcore punk.

=== Colonial era ===
A few instruments, such as drums and trumpets, are known to have existed in the early history of the Maryland colony, probably as a functional means "of calling the populace to church or to market, or in serving as symbols for sea captains and those from the military"; some folk dancing and ballad singing is also substantiated by the historical record. The early colonists had little tradition of any performance art, due to the small number of individuals, their low standard of living and great poverty and disease.

With the arrival of large numbers of slaves, however, some white plantation owners earned enough wealth to invest in music and dance. The upper class used instruments like the flute, violin and harpsichord and danced formal dances like the stately minuet or English country dance, while the lower classes preferred reels and jigs, accompanied by various kinds of guitars, drums, banjos, transverse flutes and recorders, as well as, more rarely, hammered dulcimers and harpsichords.

Local music groups during the colonial era did much to sponsor musical development. Annapolis, a major center for colonial music in British North America, was home to the Homony Club and the Tuesday Club, while the Freemasons held balls and concerts across Maryland. Unlike the northern United States, religious music did not prosper in Maryland until the end of the colonial period, and then only in the German communities in the bustling ethnic port city of Baltimore along with outlying rural farming towns of Carroll, Montgomery and Frederick counties. Tavern owners frequently sponsored dances and concerts during the colonial era. Beginning in 1752, theater became a major part of Maryland culture for colonists of all classes; performances included light dance and incidental music, ballad operas and the works of William Shakespeare. Aside from the cultural and state capital of Annapolis, the city of Baltimore, and county seat towns of Upper Marlboro in southern Maryland and Chestertown on the Eastern Shore of the Chesapeake Bay, were major homes for Maryland theater, home to the debuts of the latest and most popular dances. With the French and Indian War (1754–1763), and then the American Revolutionary War (1775–1783), soldiers brought back home to Maryland military band music, especially fife and drum ensembles.

=== Early independence and 19th century ===
Professional theater in Maryland died out during the American Revolution but was reestablished by 1780, now with Baltimore having replaced Annapolis as a cultural capital in the state. Maryland ratified the federal Constitution on April 28, 1788, and became the seventh state in the Union. The Holiday Street Theater in Baltimore opened in 1793 and was one of the first large theaters in the country, showcasing light theater, opera, and concerts. In 1822, Arthur Clifton from Baltimore debuted his opera The Enterprise, while religious music flourished after the 1821 opening of the first constructed Roman Catholic Cathedral in the country. The African Methodist Episcopal churches in Maryland were home to singing traditions using the shape-note method.

By the turn of the century, the middle classes of Maryland were holding regular dances featuring the cotillion, quadrille, schottische, polka and waltz. Eastern European dances were also popular, brought by immigrants from various countries. Many immigrants in Maryland moved to Baltimore, forming their own distinct neighborhoods with German liederkranz singing societies, and Irish St. Patrick's Day parades and Jewish chants flourished among their respective communities. Maryland was home to several folk traditions, including the work songs of rail and canal diggers and the crab- and oystermen of the Chesapeake Bay, whose repertoire varied from hymns to risqué songs and Bahaman shanties.

By the middle of the 19th century, Baltimore was a major center of sheet music publishing, home to Joseph Carr, F. D. Benteen, John Cole and George Willig, as well as the piano-building businesses of William Knabe and Charles Stieff. This period also saw the rise of blackface minstrel shows, featuring the pseudo-African American songs of composers like Dan Emmett and Stephen Foster.

During the Civil War, Maryland was a border state, home to people who sympathized with both sides of the conflict. Federal troops occupied Baltimore, and some people who wrote music that favored the Confederacy were jailed; these pieces included "The Confederacy March", "Stonewall Jackson's Way" and "Maryland, My Maryland", the last later becoming Maryland's state song. The Civil War left several lasting effects on American music nationwide, most importantly the normalization of white and black cultural mixing, especially in music, caused by the mixing of soldiers in multiracial units; military brass bands became a popular part of the music scene during and after the war, one of the first being the Moxley Band from Frederick.

The middle of the 19th century saw a wave of immigration from Europe into the United States, including a large number of German musicians who settled in Baltimore; the presence of these musicians, as well as the general growth in urban population with the Industrial Revolution and the continued rise of the music publishing industry, helped make music training more affordable for more Americans.

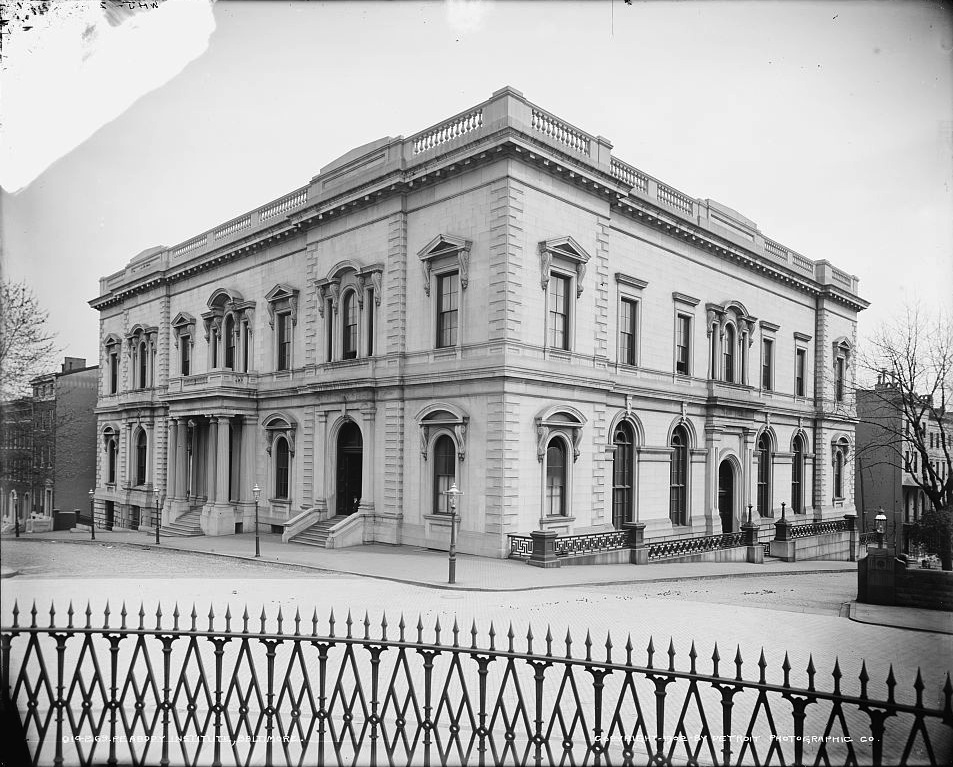
Peabody Institute in Baltimore in about 1902

Conservatories, institutes of music education, were introduced to the United States in the mid to late 19th century, beginning with Baltimore's Peabody Institute's Conservatory of Music, founded in 1857. The Peabody trained numerous musicians who went on to found most of Baltimore's major musical organizations, including the Baltimore Opera, Baltimore Choral Arts and the Baltimore Symphony Orchestra. Though founded in 1857, the Peabody Institute did not hold an orchestral concert until after the Civil War, when James Monroe Deems directed a concert; Deems was a musician and composer, known for Nebuchadnezzar, one of the first American oratorios. He was succeeded by Lucien Southard, who failed to organize the institute (then known as the Academy of Music), blaming the lack of a "proper musical atmosphere" in Baltimore. It was not until Asger Hamerik's reign that the Peabody Symphony Orchestra finally became successful, one of only five professional orchestras in the country at the time. Hamerik was an advocate of American music and regularly included the works of American composers, eschewing the more typical European programs.

The Peabody during Hamerik's leadership produced such noted individuals as Otto Sutro, publisher, music store owner and host of a music society called the Wednesday Club, and with fellow Peabody alum Fritz Finke, founder of the Oratorio Society. In 1871, Ford's Grand Opera House opened, followed three years later by the Academy of Music; this new Academy of Music shared the name with the Peabody Institute's organization, but in the same year changed to the Conservatory of Music. The Academy's conductor, Adam Itzel, Jr. was a very popular composer, known for the national hit light opera The Tar and the Tartar.

=== Early 20th century ===
There were a number of mostly informal musical societies in Maryland by the end of the 19th century, including the Saturday Night Club of H. L. Mencken and the Florestan Club, which hosted such musicians as Mischa Elman, Leopold Stokowski and Walter Damrosch. The Baltimore Symphony Orchestra was the first permanent orchestra in the city since 1895, when the Peabody Orchestra dissolved; it opened in 1916 with conductor Gustav Strube; this came three years after the formation of the short-lived Baltimore Opera Society, which was eventually replaced by the Baltimore Opera in 1927.

While the largely white middle- and upper-class Baltimoreans supported the orchestras and other societies, the city's African Americans formed their own Coloured Symphony Orchestra in 1931, which was municipally supported just like the BSO; the first performance included Ellis Larkins and Anne Brown, the latter known for creating the role of Bess in Porgy and Bess. At the time, Pennsylvania Avenue (often known simply as The Avenue) was the major scene for Baltimore's black musicians, and was an early home for Eubie Blake and Noble Sissle, among others.

=== Early 21st century ===
Many new, independent performing arts organizations formed in the early 21st century, including the Baltimore Rock Opera Society, Symphony Number One, Lunar Ensemble, and SONAR New Music Ensemble. Many of these groups were founded by students and alumni of the Peabody Institute.

== Folk music ==
Maryland's folk music heritage remains little studied. There have been no major musicological studies in Maryland, though some Anglo-American and African American folk songs have been documented. The Library of Congress' American Folklife Center has a library of recorded Maryland folk music, which includes a wide array of songs and styles, including Bahamanian spirituals, Mexican music, African American blues, Appalachian folk music, steelpan and gospel music, and Piscataway music. Maryland's folk heritage also includes the traditional music of the German communities of central and western Maryland. Cornet bands, such as the Rohrersville Cornet Band, are also a prominent part of Maryland's folk heritage.

The oystermen and others who work on the Chesapeake Bay have their own distinct folk song styles which include hymns and work songs. Some locally popular performers have used these folk themes in their music, including Bob Zentz and Steve Keith, all of whom have appeared on records by the Annapolis Maritime Museum's Chesapeake Music Institute. The Piedmont blues, a style of blues music, is most closely associated with the music of Virginia, North Carolina, Georgia and South Carolina, but also exists in Maryland, which has produced modern performers like Warner Williams and Jay Summerour. Bill Jackson, born 1906, from Granite, Maryland was an obscure Piedmont blues guitarist and singer. He was discovered by Pete Welding and recorded his first and only record in 1962. The Piedmont blues arose from a mixture of black gospel music with white string ensembles, and is characterized by a style of guitar playing influenced by ragtime and country music.

== Popular music ==
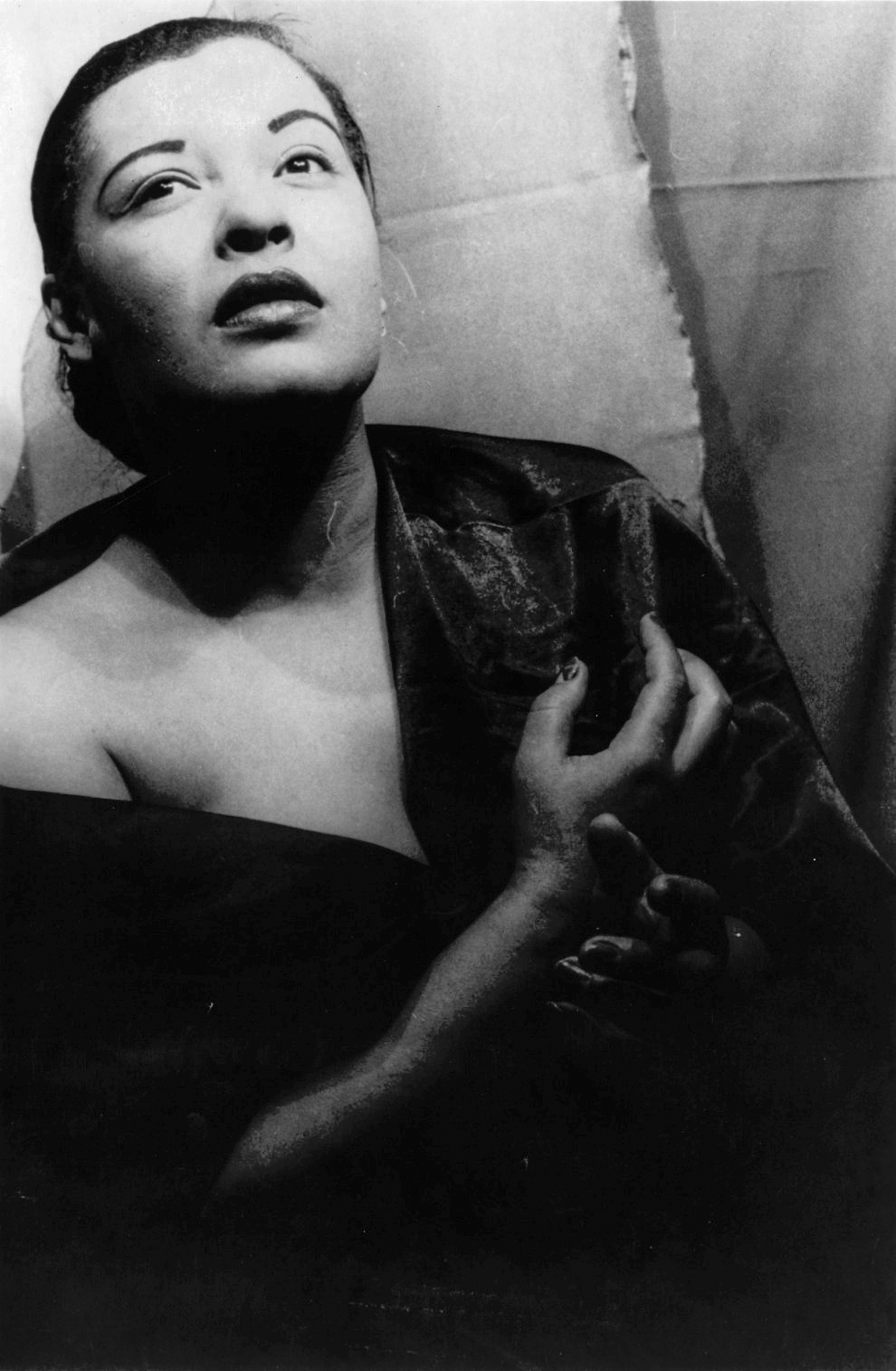
Billie Holiday was a famous jazz singer who grew up in Fells Point, Baltimore.

Maryland has produced popular musicians from many fields, including doo wop and hardcore punk, as well as the gangsta rap of Tupac Shakur, the contemporary R&B of Toni Braxton (who had two No. 1 Billboard Hot 100 hits, including "Un-break My Heart" in 1996), Sisqo (who had a No. 1 Hot 100 hit with "Incomplete" in 2000), and Mario (who had a No. 1 Hot 100 hit with "Let Me Love You" in 2005), and the pop of Cass Elliott. Though doo wop can be traced to many urban areas across the United States, especially New York City, Sonny Til's 1946 band called The Vibranaires, later known as The Orioles, can be considered the first doo wop group. The genre-crossing Frank Zappa was also from Maryland, as was Tupac Shakur, who was born in Harlem, though he began his career in Baltimore, eventually becoming one of the most famous rappers in hip hop history. Rapper Logic has had two No. 1 albums on the Billboard 200 including Everybody in 2017.

Maryland has also produced many renowned jazz musicians, such as Eubie Blake, Elmer Snowden and Billie Holiday. The Urbanite magazine describes Baltimore jazz as variously a wildly varying array of styles or a "hard bop town, where R&B, gospel and bebop meet"; during the middle of the 20th century, Baltimore produced a vibrant local jazz tradition characterized by the use of the B3 organ. Many modern Baltimorean jazz musicians are renowned saxophonists, including Gary Thomas, Gary Bartz and the Afro-Caribbean influenced TK Blue. Internationally acclaimed jazz ensemble Fertile Ground are also based in Baltimore.

Talking Heads lead singer David Byrne lived in Baltimore. Jimmie's Chicken Shack, Clutch, Good Charlotte, SR-71, All Time Low, and O.A.R. are other popular American rock bands with strong ties to Maryland.

Mama Cass Elliot of The Mamas & the Papas was from Maryland, and began her singing career there. Another Maryland band similar to the Mamas and Papas, the Peppermint Rainbow, was discovered by Mama Cass and had a top forty hit with the song "Will you be staying after Sunday". Maryland-based band The Ravyns are also notable for having their song "Raised on the Radio" appear on the soundtrack to Fast Times at Ridgemont High. The Dundalk-based Chorus of the Chesapeake won international championships in 1961 and 1971.

Baltimore's hardcore punk scene has been overshadowed by DC's. Jule's Loft, was described by author Steven Blush as the "apex of the Baltimore (hardcore) scene" in 1983 and 1984. The 1980s also saw the development of a local new wave scene led by the bands Ebeneezer & the Bludgeons, Null Set, and Here Today (later Vigil (band)). Later in the decade, emo bands like Reptile House had some success and recorded with Ian MacKaye in DC. Some early Baltimore punk musicians moved onto other local bands by the end of the 1990s, resulting in local mainstays Lungfish and Fascist Fascist, who became regionally prominent. The Urbanite magazine has identified several major trends in local Baltimorean music, including the rise of psychedelic-folk singer-songwriters like Entrance and the house/hip hop dance fusion called Baltimore club, pioneered by DJs like Rod Lee. More recently, Baltimore's indie rock scene has produced performers like Cass McCombs and Mary Prankster.

Maryland has had a thriving doom metal scene since the early 1990s, and is now considered to have its own "Maryland doom" sound. This scene was started in the late 1970s with The Obsessed, a band led by Scott "Wino" Weinrich. During this time, Northern Virginia's Pentagram also had a heavy influence on the Maryland scene. After disbanding The Obsessed in the mid 80s and moving to California to sing with doom legends Saint Vitus, Wino reformed The Obsessed and signed to the German-based Hellhound Records. With The Obsessed on board, Hellhound began to sign other Maryland bands, such as Wretched, Iron Man, Unorthodox, Internal Void, and Revelation (who already had an album on Rise Above Records). After Hellhound's demise in the late 90s, many Maryland doom bands were picked up by various other labels, including Southern Lord Records. After The Obsessed second break up, Wino formed Spirit Caravan and The Hidden Hand. Other current Maryland doom bands include Earthride.

1980s metal band Kix are from Hagerstown. Death metal band Dying Fetus are from Upper Marlboro. Speed-thrash metal band Offensive are from Essex in Baltimore County. Progressive metal band Periphery are from Bethesda.

Maryland has a thriving experimental music scene, based around Baltimore. The local scene is led by artists and groups such as Dan Deacon, Double Dagger and North Carolina imports Future Islands. Famed group Animal Collective had their beginnings in the suburbs surrounding Baltimore, and named their breakout 2009 album Merriweather Post Pavilion after the famed Pavilion in Columbia.

== See also ==
- Music of Baltimore
- Music of the Mid-Atlantic United States
