= Pleasant Valley (Maryland) =

Valley in Washington County, Maryland, United States

Coordinates: 39°38′20″N 77°32′50″W

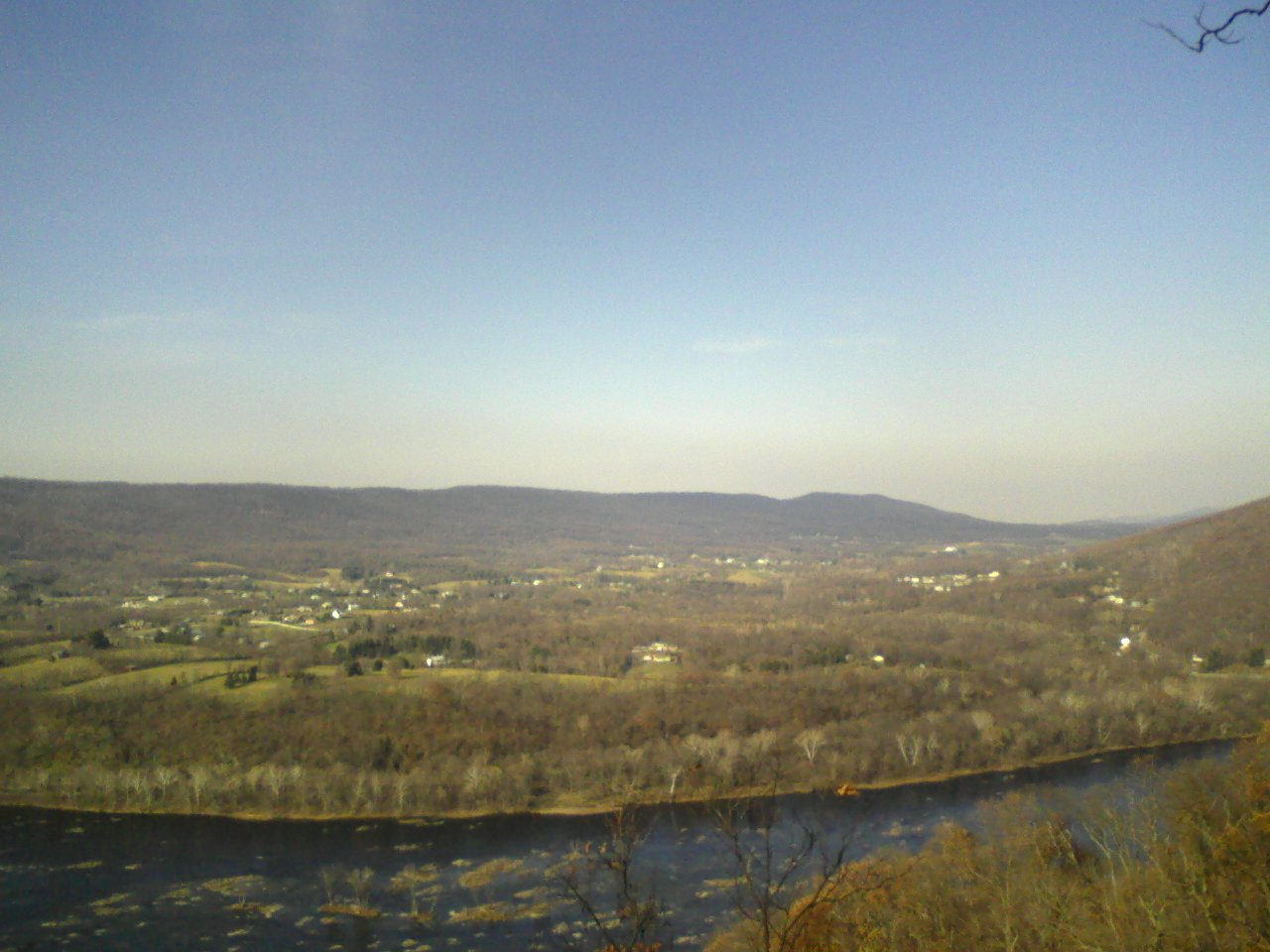
- Pleasant Valley as seen from Short Hill Mountain with the Potomac River in the foreground
- Floor elevation: 600 ft (180 m)
- Length: 10 miles (16 km) North-South
- Width: 2 miles (3.2 km)

Geography
- Location: Washington County, Maryland
- Population centers: Rohrersville
- Borders on: South Mountain (east); Elk Ridge (west); Potomac River (south); Israel Creek (north)
- Traversed by: U.S. Route 340; Maryland Route 67
- Interactive map of Pleasant Valley

Pleasant Valley is a small valley in Washington County, Maryland, United States.

== Geography ==
The valley is bound by South Mountain to the east, Elk Ridge to the west and the Potomac River to the south. To the north the valley opens up to connect with the Hagerstown Valley near Boonsboro. The northern definition of Pleasant Valley is the watershed divide between the Israel Creek and the Little Antietam Creek, both tributaries of the Potomac River.

This northern watershed boundary lies to the north of the little town of Gapland (on Israel Creek) and to the south of Rohrersville (a town in the Little Antietam Creek drainage area). Geographically the valley is an extension of the Between the Hills valley south of the Potomac in Virginia. The Short Hill fault, which separates Elk Ridge from South Mountain runs along the east edge of Pleasant Valley, along the west flank of South Mountain.

== History ==
The eastern side of Pleasant Valley, on the slope of South Mountain is the location of William Park's "Park Hall." Surveyed in 1731 it was the first land tract (legally) patented by a Euromerican in what would eventually become Washington County. Pleasant Valley is on the east side of Elk Ridge mountain. On the opposite (west side) of Elk Ridge is the historic Kennedy farm where John Brown and his followers stayed prior to their raid on nearby Harpers Ferry, West Virginia. A handful of John Brown's men escaped from the Federal soldiers after the raid was defeated, and the escape route that these men took went north to Pennsylvania following Elk Ridge and South Mountain. The escaping raiders crossed from Elk Ridge mountain to South Mountain in the area around Rohrersville, to the north of Pleasant Valley. Nestled at the foot of Elk Ridge on the west side of the lower valley is the community of Yarrowsburg, named for early (1830s) free African-American residents Aquilla and Polly Yarrow.

During the Antietam Campaign of the American Civil War, Pleasant Valley was the site of a Confederate picket line, intended to prevent General George B. McClellan's Union Army from coming to the rescue of the Union garrison in Harpers Ferry. Later, after the Battle of Antietam, the farmland of Pleasant Valley was filled with tents of soldiers from the Union Army—Pleasant Valley was a designated bivouac for rest and recovery after the battle.
