= Elk Ridge (Maryland) =

Mountain in western Maryland, USA

Coordinates: 39°23′13″N 77°41′24″W

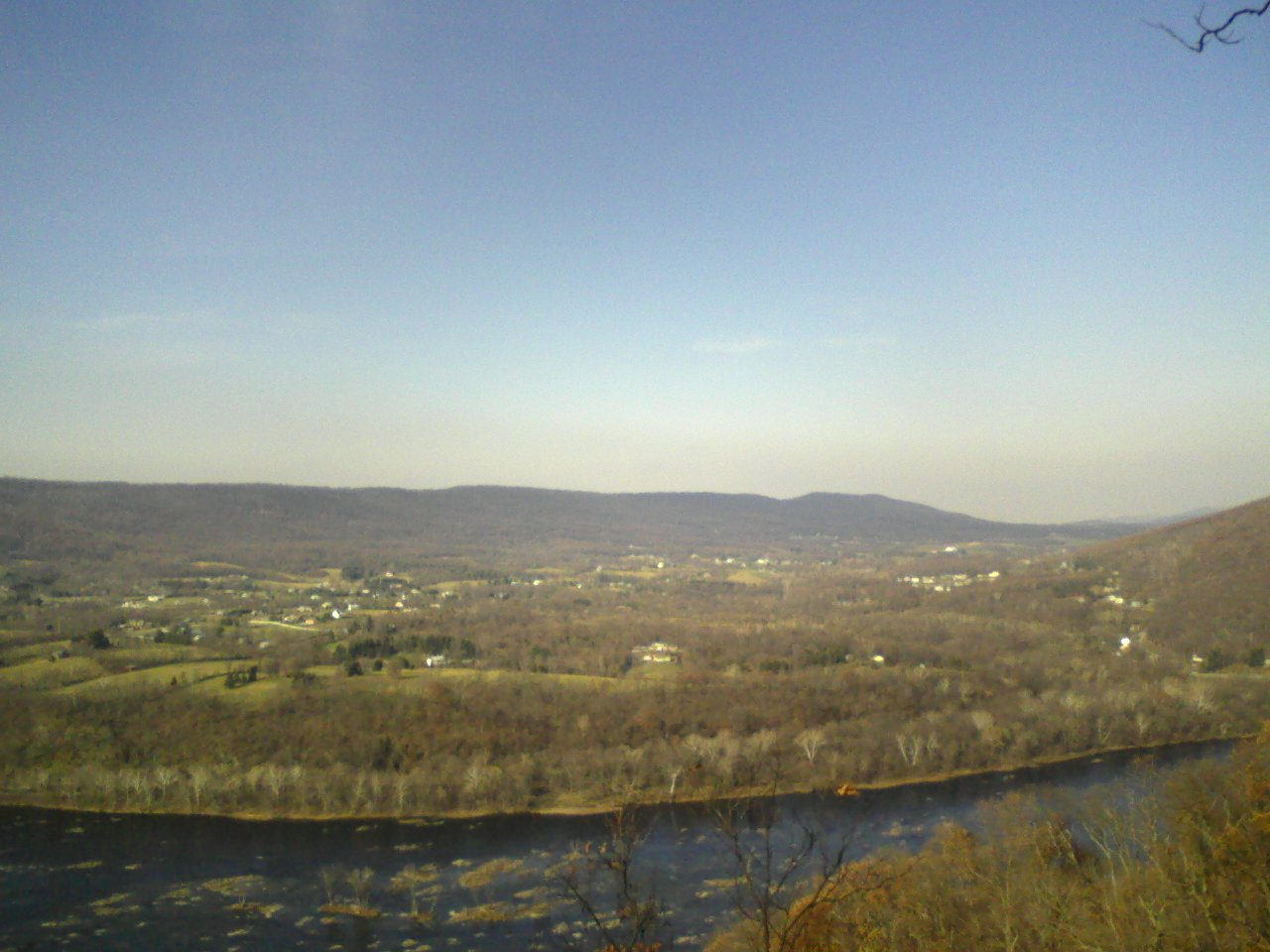
- Elk Ridge as seen from across the Potomac River atop Short Hill Mountain

Highest point
- Elevation: 1,476 ft (450 m)
- Prominence: 700 ft (210 m)

Geography
- Location: Washington County, Maryland, U.S.
- Parent range: Blue Ridge Mountains
- Topo map: USGS Harpers Ferry

Climbing
- Easiest route: Hike

Elk Ridge, or Elk Mountain, is a mountain ridge of the Blue Ridge Mountains in Maryland and is the westernmost of four parallel ridges. It forms the western side of a narrow valley in which are situated the towns of Yarrowsburg and Brownsville. South Mountain is on the eastern side of this valley running roughly parallel to it. The ridge runs from Rohrersville, in the north, to the Potomac River across from Harpers Ferry, West Virginia, in the south. Across the Potomac the ridge continues as Blue Ridge Mountain in Virginia and West Virginia. To the west of Elk Mountain is the broader Cumberland Valley, in which lie the towns of Hagerstown and Chambersburg, and the Potomac River. The southern end of the ridge, which is part of Harpers Ferry National Historical Park, is known as Maryland Heights.

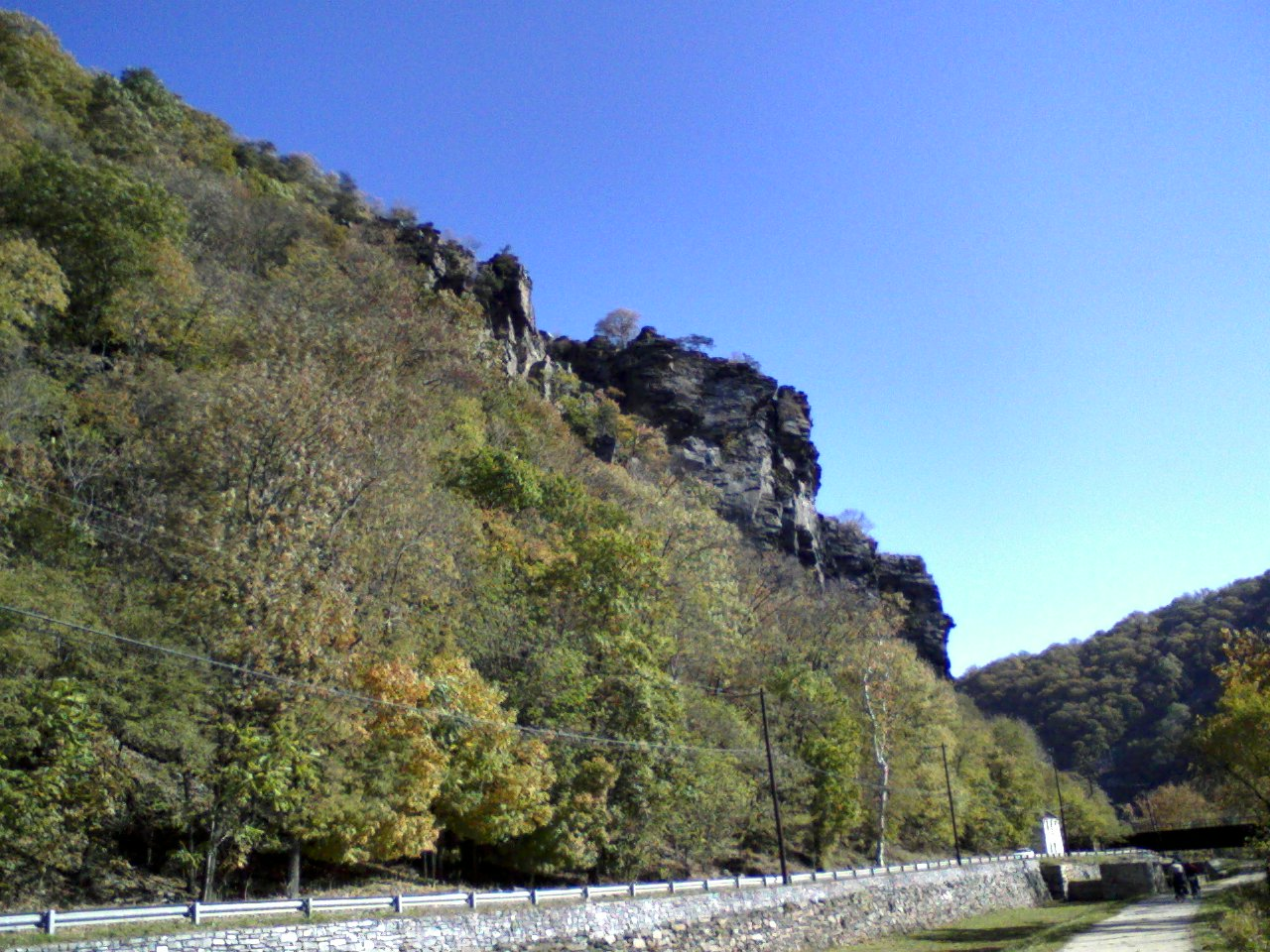
Maryland Heights Cliffs as seen from the C&O Canal

== History ==
In the early 19th century, Elk Ridge was the site of numerous charcoal hearths, which produced charcoal for nearby iron furnaces from wood harvested on the mountain. More than 50 hearths were constructed between 1810 and 1840.

The Maryland Heights portion of Elk Ridge was the scene of much activity during the American Civil War. Artillery emplacements and fortifications were first erected on the mountain by Union forces in 1862, during Stonewall Jackson's Valley Campaign. Later that year, during the Battle of Harpers Ferry, the union fortifications on the mountain were attacked by units under General Lafayette McLaws, who subsequently took control of the ridge and used it to deliver devastating artillery fire against the Union garrison at Harpers Ferry. After the battle Confederate forces abandoned the ridge to rejoin the Army of Northern Virginia at Antietam and the Union army quickly reoccupied the heights.

Following the Battle of Antietam, Abraham Lincoln came to Maryland to review the army, including the garrisons on the mountain. He began the ascent, but because of the steepness of the slope, turned around halfway up, concluding any man who could make the climb would pass his muster. In June 1863 Union forces again took control of the ridge and enlarged the fortifications in response to the Confederate invasion of Maryland during the Gettysburg campaign.

The "Pinnacle Lot" of the Maryland Heights was purchased by the Maryland Park System from the grandchildren of the last private owner, Judge Patrick Chapman Savin (1820-1889) of Harper's Ferry, MD; the lot was in turn gifted by the State of Maryland to the National Park Service in the 1950s. Judge Patrick and his brother, John Chapman Savin, and a future son-in-law, John Marion Marsteller (1841-1898) were among those who participated in the capture of John Brown and his men. It was during this time that the side of the cliff overlooking Harper's Ferry was leased for advertising seen by the passengers of trains as they entered and exited the tunnel under the Maryland Heights.

== Recreation ==
A trail system, maintained by the National Park Service, ascends Maryland Heights and tours the Civil War-era fortifications and provides access to the cliffs on the mountain which contain views of Harpers Ferry and the Potomac Water Gap. An unmaintained trail leads along the ridge of Park Service land onto private property to Buggy Rocks and views east of Pleasant Valley. Mountain climbing is permitted by the National Park Service along the Maryland Heights cliffs.

== Bibliography ==
- Whitman, T. Stephen, Antietam 1862: Gateway to Emancipation, ABC-CLIO, 2012 ISBN 0313397341.
