= Maryland Route 67 =

State highway in Washington County, Maryland, US, known as Rohrersville Rd

Maryland Route 67
- Rohrersville Road
- Maryland Route 67 highlighted in red

Route information
- Maintained by MDSHA
- Length: 12.20 mi (19.63 km)
- Existed: 1927–present
- Tourist routes: Antietam Campaign Scenic Byway

Major junctions
- South end: US 340 in Weverton
- North end: US 40 Alt. in Boonsboro

Location
- Country: United States
- State: Maryland
- Counties: Washington

Highway system
- Maryland highway system; Interstate; US; State; Scenic Byways
← MD 66	→ I-68

Maryland Route 67 (MD 67) is a state highway in the U.S. state of Maryland. Known as Rohrersville Road, the state highway runs 12.20 miles (19.63 km) from U.S. Route 340 (US 340) in Weverton north to US 40 Alternate in Boonsboro. MD 67 parallels the western flank of South Mountain in southeastern Washington County, connecting Boonsboro with Weverton and Rohrersville. In conjunction with US 340 and US 40 Alternate, MD 67 connects Hagerstown and Harpers Ferry, West Virginia, a link that made the highway one of the original state roads marked for improvement in 1909. The first section of the state highway was constructed through Rohrersville around 1920. The remainder of the highway was built between Boonsboro and Weverton in the late 1920s and early 1930s. MD 67 was reconstructed with multiple relocations starting in the late 1950s, culminating in a relocation at the southern terminus to tie into the US 340 freeway in the late 1960s.

== Route description ==
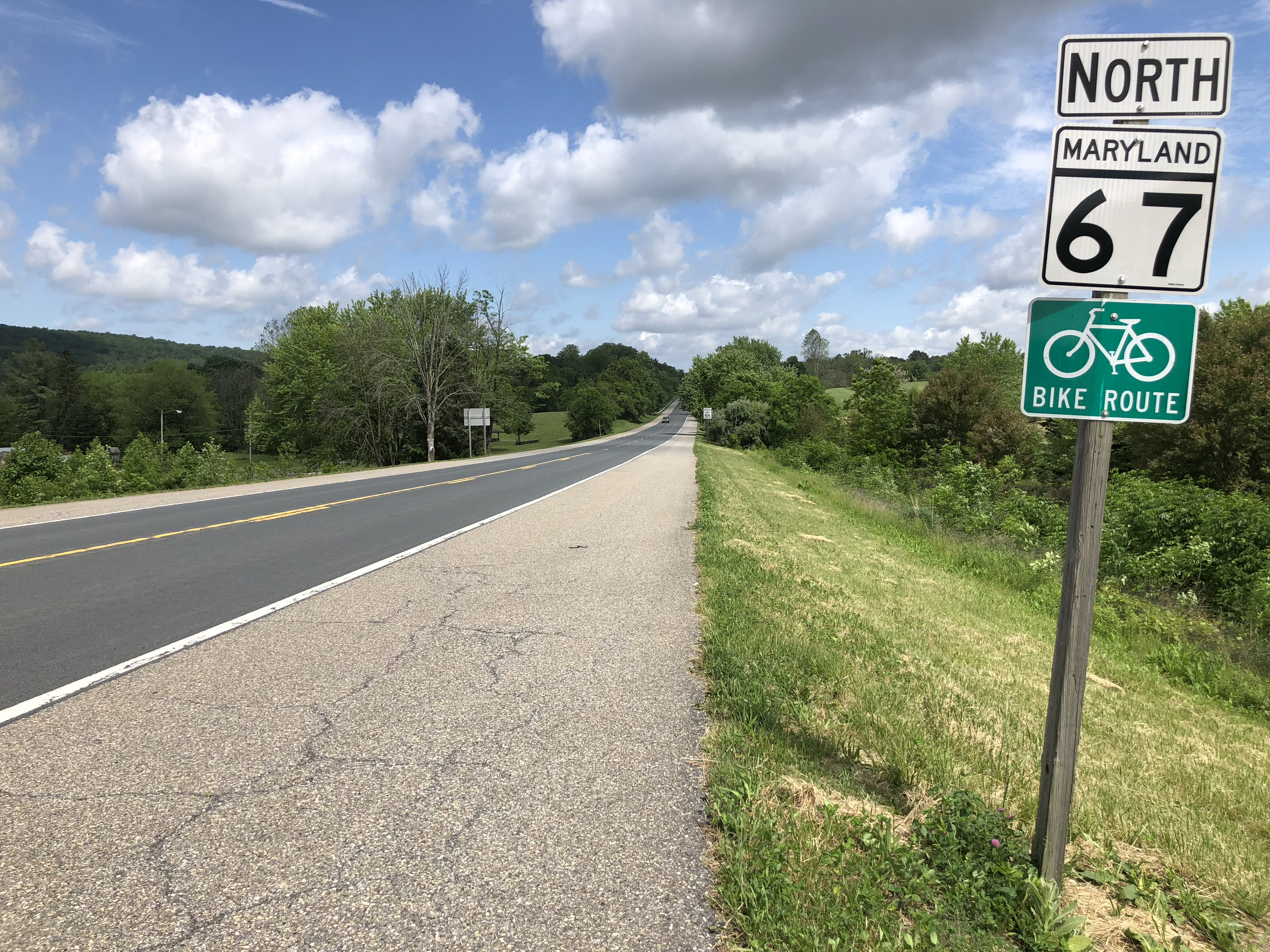
View north along MD 67 in Gapland

MD 67 begins at a trumpet interchange with US 340 (Jefferson Pike) in Weverton within the Potomac Water Gap near Harpers Ferry. The two-lane undivided highway crosses Israel Creek and heads north through the Pleasant Valley, the valley of Israel Creek between Elk Ridge to the west and South Mountain to the east. Just north of Israel Creek, MD 67 intersects MD 67D, a connector east to Weverton Road that provides access to the Appalachian Trail at the Weverton Cliffs within South Mountain State Park. Within the hamlet of Garretts Mill, the highway intersects Garretts Mill Road, which heads west toward the Robert Clagett Farm and the Magnolia Plantation, and receives the other end of Weverton Road, which is accessed via MD 67E. MD 67 passes along the edge of Brownsville, which is served by parallel Boteler Road, which uses MD 67C to rejoin MD 67 north of Brownsville.

MD 67 continues north around the village of Gapland, access to which is provided by Gapland Road. Gapland Road also heads east to Crampton's Gap, a mountain pass through South Mountain that provides access to Burkittsville in the Middletown Valley. Crampton's Gap is the site of the Battle of Crampton's Gap, Gathland State Park, and the National War Correspondents Memorial. MD 67 crosses Israel Creek near its headwaters, enters the valley of Little Antietam Creek, and approaches Rohrersville. The highway bypasses the village to the east, during which the route crosses Little Antietam Creek; MD 858F (Main Street) loops through the village. The valley widens as MD 67 approaches Rohrersville. MD 67 continues north through Locust Grove and to the west of Park Hall, which contains Kefauver Place. The highway parallels another loop, Mount Carmel Church Road, which leads to the Nicodemus Mill Complex, as the route crosses Dog Creek. MD 67 passes east of a park and ride lot and enters the town of Boonsboro immediately before it reaches its northern terminus at a roundabout with US 40 Alternate (Boonsboro Pike).

== History ==
The highway from Weverton to Boonsboro was marked for improvement by the Maryland State Roads Commission as one of the original state roads in 1909. However, by 1915, the uncompleted highway was deemed as not forming a necessary part of the main arterial system. The first section of MD 67 to be improved was Main Street through Rohrersville, which was paved by 1921. The modern road was extended north to Boonsboro in 1925 and 1926. Construction began on MD 67 from Rohrersville to Gapland in 1926 and was completed in 1928. The paved highway was extended through Brownsville to north of Garretts Mill in 1929 and 1930. The southern end of pavement remained north of Garretts Mill until the modern road was extended south through Weverton to US 340 in 1934 and 1935.

MD 67 was reconstructed from Boonsboro to Gapland starting in the late 1950s, leaving behind several sections of old alignment that were designated sections of MD 858. Two of these sections, Main Street in Rohrersville (now MD 858F) and Mount Carmel Church Road north of Rohrersville, were bypassed in 1959. The southern terminus of MD 67 was relocated when US 340 was relocated as a four-lane divided highway through Weverton in 1964. Portions of MD 67 through Brownsville and Weverton were bypassed concurrent with the construction of MD 67's trumpet interchange around 1969.

== Junction list ==
The entire route is in Washington County.

Location	mi	km	Destinations	Notes
Weverton	0.00	0.00	US 340 – Harpers Ferry, Frederick	Trumpet interchange; southern terminus
Rohrersville	7.15	11.51	MD 858 north (Main Street)	Officially MD 858F
Rohrersville	8.10	13.04	MD 858 south (Main Street)	
Boonsboro	12.20	19.63	US 40 Alt. (Boonsboro Pike) – Funkstown, Middletown	Roundabout; northern terminus
1.000 mi = 1.609 km; 1.000 km = 0.621 mi

== Auxiliary routes ==
- MD 67A is the designation for an unnamed 0.08-mile-long (0.13 km) one-lane ramp from southbound MD 67 to the north end of MD 858F (Main Street) in Rohrersville.
- MD 67B is the designation for an unnamed 0.09-mile-long (0.14 km) spur north from the northern end of Gapland Road on the southbound side of MD 67 in Gapland.
- MD 67C is the designation for a 0.03-mile-long (0.048 km) section of Boteler Road at its northern junction with MD 67 in Brownsville.
- MD 67D is the designation for Weverton Road, a 0.31-mile (0.50 km) connector from MD 67 just north of Israel Creek to near the southern end of the main portion of Weverton Road in Weverton.
- MD 67E is the designation for Weverton Road, a 0.04-mile (0.064 km) connector from MD 67 to near the northern end of Weverton Road north of Weverton.
- MD 67F is the designation for the unnamed 0.09-mile (0.14 km) access road from MD 67 to Pleasant Valley Elementary School between Weverton and Brownsville.
