= Caspar Wever =

Early 19th century American surveyor and builder

Caspar Willis Wever
- Born: 1786; Lancaster County, Pennsylvania, U.S.
- Died: February 7, 1861 (aged 74–75); Maryland, U.S.
- Occupations: Construction superintendent; surveyor; civil engineer
- Known for: Carrollton Viaduct; Thomas Viaduct; National Road (Ohio division)
- Spouse: Jane Catharine Dunlop (m. 1812)
- Engineering career
- Employers: United States Government; Baltimore and Ohio Railroad
- Projects: National Road in Ohio; B&O main line west of Baltimore

Caspar Willis Wever (1786 – February 7, 1861), also spelled Casper W. Wever, was an American construction superintendent and surveyor associated with early United States internal improvements. He supervised National Road construction west of the Ohio River between Bridgeport and Zanesville (1825–1829) and later served as superintendent of construction on the Baltimore and Ohio Railroad (B&O), where he directed early works including the Carrollton Viaduct and other main-line structures. In that role, he represented an early form of construction-based engineering authority, emphasizing contractor management, field supervision in contrast to the survey and design-oriented approach of the railroad’s Board of Engineers. He helped promote the industrial village of Weverton, Maryland, and served one term in the Maryland House of Delegates in 1821.

== Early life and family ==
Wever was born in 1786 in Lancaster County, Pennsylvania, to Adam Wever (1752–1845) and Catherine Dietz; by the 1810s, he was living in Washington County, Maryland. He married Jane Catharine Dunlop (1792–1859) in 1812, and they had nine children. He represented Washington County in the Maryland House of Delegates for a one-year term in 1821.

== Maryland politics ==
Wever was appointed a justice of the peace in Washington County in 1821. He attended internal-improvement meetings in 1823 and 1826, advocating a Potomac canal, reflecting his early involvement in regional infrastructure promotion.

== National Road (1825–1829) ==
In the 1810s and early 1820s, construction of the Cumberland (National) Road proceeded under a commissioner–superintendent model within the Treasury Department; practice drew on state-chartered turnpike precedents before later transitioning to a War Department survey-and-engineer system. The General Survey Act of April 30, 1824, shifted national road-and-canal work to a War Department framework under the Board of Engineers for Internal Improvements.

Appointed under War Department authority, Wever served as superintendent for the Ohio division between Bridgeport (opposite Wheeling) and Zanesville, a distance of about 70 miles. The Chief Engineer’s instructions for the western continuation appear in H. Doc. 19-1-51 (January 21, 1826), reflecting the engineer-board system’s procedural controls for plans, measurements, and reporting.

Organization and superintendent authority. Wever let work in short concurrent sections, separating earthwork and metaling from major masonry; the superintendent’s office applied common specifications, measurement rules, and inspection routines across contracts. Within these standards he could subdivide or combine sections, approve local stone sources, accept or reject materials and workmanship, order minor plan and quantity adjustments responsive to geology and hydrology, sequence lettings to match seasons and appropriations, and certify progress estimates from standardized field books. Jonathan Knight’s guidance favored masonry at short spans near sound rock and timber superstructures where suitable stone or span length dictated, often with timber set on masonry abutments and sheathed for weatherproofing.

Progress and reporting. By late 1826–1827, multiple sections between Wheeling and Zanesville were surveyed and under contract. In his final annual report (dated November 18, 1828; transmitted December 11, 1828), Wever reported about 52 miles completed from the Ohio River to west of Cambridge, with the balance to Zanesville under contract, subject to appropriations. In 1829, with the administrative change to the Andrew Jackson administration, James Hampson succeeded Wever on the Ohio divisions; 1830–1832 documents list Hampson as superintendent east or west of Zanesville, reflecting reassignments then in effect.

=== Notable Ohio bridge packages (examples) ===
An 1833 American Railroad Journal summary for the Ohio division listed forty-two stone-arch bridges and two covered timber bridges—at Wills Creek (Cambridge, 1828) and Big Salt Creek (1829). A modern guide summarizes the corridor and its surviving works.

Name	Type	Spans and length (approx.)	Year(s)	Contractor(s)	Source
Blaine Hill S Bridge (Wheeling Creek)	Masonry, 3 segmental arches	≈25 ft, 40 ft, 50 ft (total ≈345 ft)	1826	James Lloyd; Robert Wilson	"1828 Blaine "S" Bridge". Ohio.org (Ohio Department of Development).; "Blaine Hill "S" Bridge (NRIS 10000082)". National Park Service.; "Blaine Hill S Bridge". HistoricBridges.org.
Wills Creek (Cambridge)	Covered timber arch (on masonry)	chord ≈150 ft	1828	Lewis Wernwag; James Kinkead	; "National Road Historic Brochure (Wills Creek marker excerpt)" (PDF). Visit Guernsey County.; "Wills Creek and Old Double Bridge, Cambridge, Ohio (postcard text)". Columbus Metropolitan Library.
Big Salt Creek	Covered timber arch	chord ≈60 ft	1829	(reported in Wever’s returns)	; "Salt Creek Covered Bridge (HAER OH-127), data pages" (PDF). Library of Congress.
Stillwater Creek (Morristown–Hendrysburg)	Masonry arch	(noted)	1820s	James Lloyd; Robert Wilson	
Spencer Creek	Masonry arch	(noted)	1820s	James Lloyd; Robert Wilson	

== Baltimore and Ohio Railroad (1828–1836) ==
In 1828, the B&O hired Wever as superintendent of construction for its main line, working alongside engineers such as Stephen H. Long, William G. McNeill, and Jonathan Knight. In this role, Wever directed field execution, contractor coordination, and early construction works, while the Board of Engineers retained authority over surveys, route location, and engineering policy. In practice, this arrangement created a division between design authority and construction execution, with Wever exercising day-to-day control over contractors and field operations while engineering policy remained with the Board.

During the early construction phase, Wever was also involved in the practical adjustment of the railroad’s centerline, particularly in the approach to Parr's Ridge and the Deep Cut, west of Baltimore. Working with surveyor Howard Joseph Ranney, he participated in relocating portions of the line to address constructability, grading, and cost concerns that emerged after the initial surveys. These adjustments reconciled the Board of Engineers’ selected alignments with field conditions, including excavation limits, drainage, and the stability of embankments and cut slopes, while highlighting the difficulty of applying the Board’s original design criteria in practice, as surveyed alignments proved costly or impractical to implement.

Wever also oversaw early structures including the Carrollton Viaduct (1828–1829) over Gwynns Falls and the Patterson Viaduct (1829) on the Patapsco River.

Wever resigned effective July 1, 1836, the day B&O president Philip E. Thomas also resigned. Historians have cited the division between construction execution and engineering design, evident in Wever’s work, as characteristic of early railroad organization, in which responsibilities for field operations and technical policy were not yet fully integrated.

== Harpers Ferry crossing ==
The Baltimore and Ohio Railroad’s crossing of the Potomac River at Harpers Ferry was constructed in the mid-1830s as part of the railroad’s westward extension and its connection with the Winchester and Potomac Railroad. The work formed part of the construction program overseen by superintendent of construction Caspar W. Wever, whose responsibilities included contractor coordination and execution of masonry and substructure works under the general direction of the railroad’s engineering staff.

=== Construction and early deficiencies ===
The crossing consisted of a timber-truss superstructure designed under the direction of Benjamin H. Latrobe Jr. and Lewis Wernwag, supported on masonry piers constructed in the Potomac River channel. Charles Wilson received the masonry contract in 1835, and Wernwag received the contract for the wooden superstructure the following spring.

By May 1836, Latrobe had observed that the masonry did not fully follow the design, although he initially judged the work likely to be strong. After the bridge was completed around December 1836, instability under load and cracking in the pier heads led Latrobe to conclude that the masonry was defective. A subsequent examination by Latrobe, Charles B. Fisk, and Jonathan Knight attributed the failure to defective workmanship and materials, including small stone used in the foundations and skewbacks.

The Board of Directors commissioned an investigating committee that later determined that the masonry style, stone sizes, and foundation dimensions had been changed from Latrobe’s design, and that Wever had issued a change order affecting the masonry before the bids were approved. The committee also found that Wilson had obtained inferior stone from quarries owned by Wever, at company expense, rather than using better material available near Harpers Ferry.

=== Reconstruction and resignation ===
Remedial work required substantial reconstruction of the defective piers, including temporary support of the wooden superstructure while portions of the masonry were rebuilt. The masonry problems occurred during a period of broader organizational change at the B&O. Philip E. Thomas resigned as president on June 30, 1836, and Wever resigned the same day as construction superintendent. Dilts notes that Wever’s reasons for leaving were not recorded, but that his resignation may have been connected either to company reorganization or to the developing problems at the Harpers Ferry bridge.

In October 1837, Latrobe's brother, John H. Latrobe, general counsel for the railroad, concluded that Wever was not legally liable because the company had authorized the change in masonry style and because Wever had been sent away on surveys west of Harpers Ferry while the piers were being built. Latrobe also found no tangible evidence of collusion between Wever and Wilson before the contract was signed, and concluded that Wilson’s defective work had been carried out openly rather than concealed from the company.

=== Significance ===
The Harpers Ferry crossing illustrates the risks of early railroad construction under divided authority for engineering and construction. In Wever’s case, the episode brought together contractor selection, material procurement, design changes, field supervision, and later legal responsibility. The failure of the pier masonry also showed how decisions made for constructability or economy could undermine the assumptions of the bridge design when execution and engineering review were not fully integrated.

== Work in Washington, D.C. ==
In 1832, Wever served as superintendent for a project to rebuild Pennsylvania Avenue in Washington. Congressional materials also record proposals concerning reconstruction of the Potomac Long Bridge in 1834.

== Weverton (industrial development) ==
In the 1830s, Wever platted and attempted to develop the industrial village of Weverton, Maryland, near Lock 31 of the C&O Canal, with water-powered mills, a file factory, and stone-working. The Maryland General Assembly incorporated the Weverton Manufacturing Company by Chapter 144 of the Acts of 1834 (amended in 1836), promoting the site’s river power and dual access to canal and rail. Archival studies of the canal corridor describe nearby quarrying, a file factory operating by the mid-1840s, and limited long-term growth due to floods and markets before the Civil War. Wever also joined incorporations for the Weverton and Boonsboro' Turnpike Company (1846) and a local mutual insurance company (1850).

== Later life and death ==
Wever resided near Petersville and the Weverton area in later years and died in Maryland on February 7, 1861. A Hagerstown newspaper carried his obituary in March 1861.

== Legacy and assessment ==
Structures from Wever’s National Road and B&O tenure, including the Carrollton Viaduct (1829) and early B&O viaducts in Maryland, are recognized as historic civil engineering landmarks. Scholarship on early B&O governance highlights debates over organization and costs that framed technical decisions during the railroad’s first decade.

Wever’s career has been interpreted as illustrative of the construction-superintendent model that characterized early American civil engineering practice, in which authority over execution, materials, and contractors was distinct from that of design engineers. The difficulties encountered on the early B&O—particularly the tensions between surveyed designs and actual field conditions—have been interpreted by Calhoun (1961) as part of a broader transition toward more integrated engineering organizations in later railroad development.
