= Dickeyville Historic District =

Historic district west of Baltimore, Maryland, U.S.

- U.S. National Register of Historic Places
- U.S. Historic district
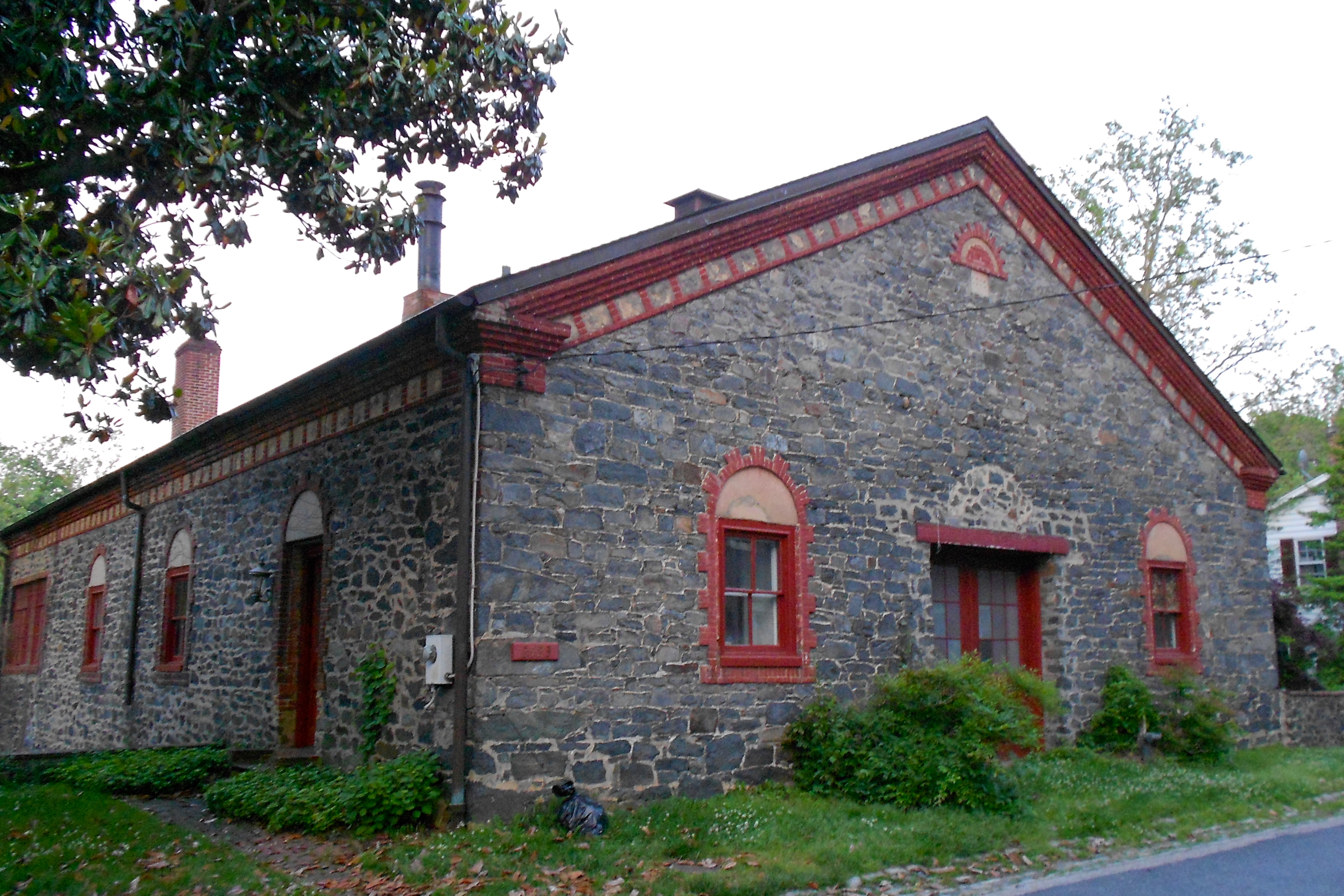
- Mill built in 1879

- Location within Baltimore Location within Maryland Location within the United States
- Location: Both sides of Forest Park Ave. in the Gwynn's Falls area of Baltimore, Maryland
- Coordinates: 39°19′00″N 76°42′18″W
- Area: 500 acres (200 ha)
- Built: 1762
- Architect: Multiple
- Architectural style: Late Victorian
- NRHP reference No.: 72001494
- Added to NRHP: July 12, 1972

The Dickeyville Historic District is a National Register of Historic Places-listed community located just inside the western edge of Baltimore, Maryland, near the intersection of Interstates 70 and 695 and adjacent to Kernan Hospital. A small community of about 140 homes and a historic mill, the village is on the banks of the Gwynns Falls and lies at the start of the Gwynns Falls Trail, a 15-mile (24 km) walking and biking trail that is part of the Chesapeake Bay Gateways Network. The village includes two main roads, Wetheredsville Road and Pickwick Road, and three smaller lanes, Hillhouse Road, Tucker Lane and Sekots Road.

The village flag of Dickeyville, created in 2016

== History ==
The village grew up along the banks of the Gwynns Falls from the late 17th century. Among the area's first settlers was Richard Gwin [or Gwynn], a Welshman who reputedly traded with the Algonquian Indians from 1672.

One of the first of many mills on the Gwynns Falls was built in the vicinity in 1719 by Peter Bond, Gwin's son-in-law. In 1762, a gristmill and stone house was built by Wimbert Tschudi, a Swiss mill owner, and what is believed to be the ruins of this mill may still be seen on the banks of the Gwynns Falls today. In 1779, Wimbert's son, Martin Tschudi, patented a nearby plot of land called Sly's Adventure. The Franklin Paper Mill followed in the early 19th century, giving its name, Franklinville, to the village. In 1829, three enterprising brothers, John, Samuel, and Charles Wethered, converted the Franklin Paper Mill to the manufacture of woolen cloth. The brothers also built the Ashland Mill on the east side of the village, in addition to some 30 stone houses for workers, a church and a school, and named the village "Wetheredville". John Wethered was elected to the United States Congress as a Whig from 1843 to 1845.

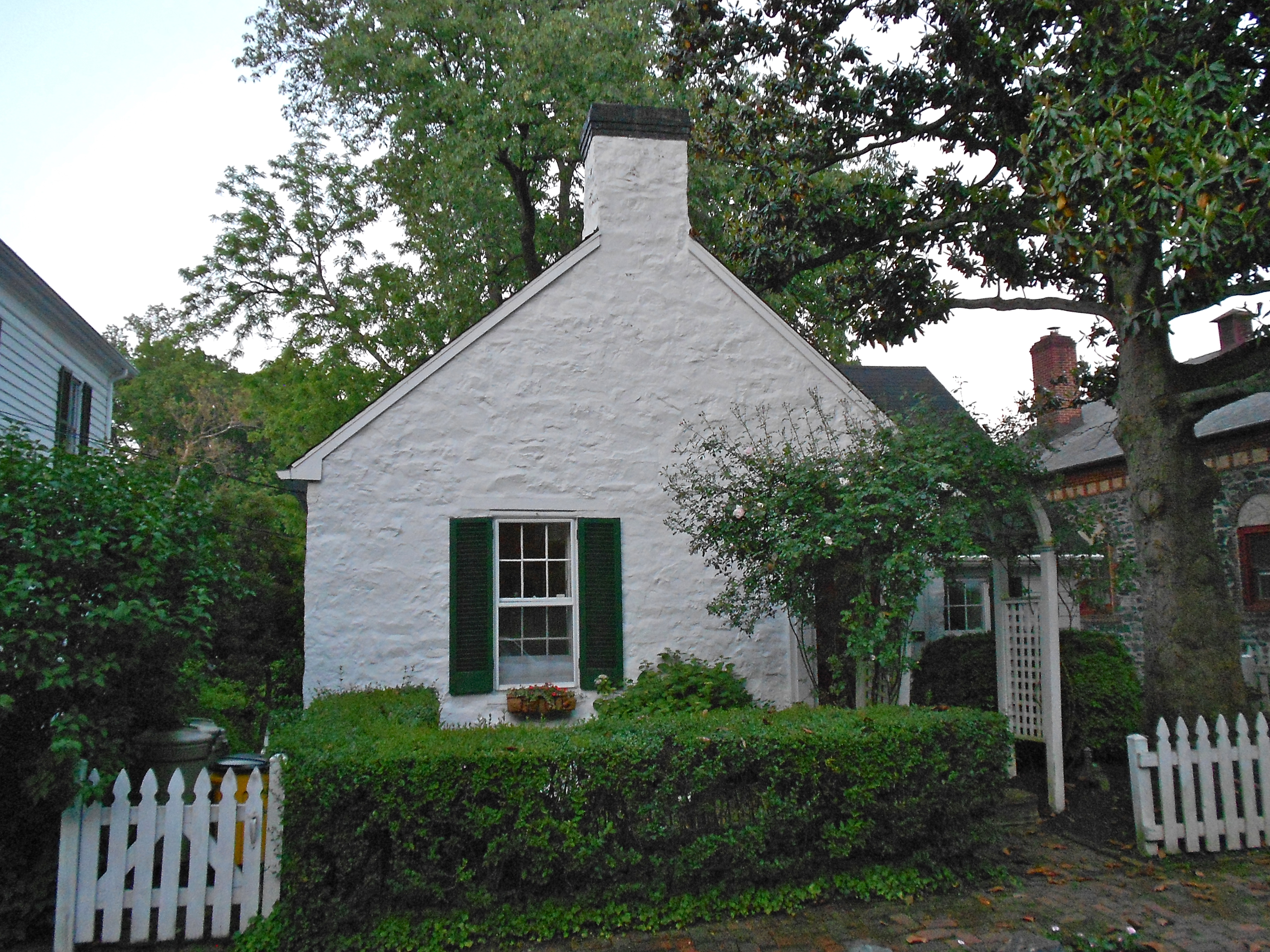
House adjoining the old mill

In 1871, the Wethereds sold the property and Ashland Manufacturing Company to William J. Dickey, whose family came from the market town of Ballymena in the north of Ireland. He paid $82,000 for 300 acres (1.2 km^{2}), three mills and many of the houses in the village.

Under Dickey, the village again prospered and expanded. Many new homes were constructed for the millhands, a Presbyterian church and a manse were built, and a village store, owned by Dickey, sold everything from buggy whips to licorice sticks. In 1887, Dickey purchased an additional fabric mill in Oella, Maryland, which remained in operation into the late 1960s. On his death in 1896, the name of the village was changed from Wetheredsville to Dickeyville. The Dickey family sold out to the Glasgow Mills in 1909, but with the decline of the textile business, work in the mills became harder to get. The Glasgow Mills closed and the formerly prosperous Dickeyville became a shanty town with a reputation for crime and low life.

In 1934, the Dickey properties, which included much of the village of 81 homes, three mills and the Wethered-Dickey mansion on nearby Forest Park Avenue (the mansion has since been demolished) was sold at auction for $42,000. A local development company embarked upon the restoration of the properties. They decided that the old buildings should be preserved and only the totally unstable would be demolished. The buildings that remained might be redesigned and modernized but in such a way as to preserve their historic character. New homes must blend in unobtrusively with the old. These requirements are initially overseen by the Dickeyville Community Association, a homeowners group formed in 1938.

A 1947 advertisement for houses sold by Philip E. Lamb described Dickeyville as a racially "restricted community".

The Village was listed in the National Register of Historic Places in 1968.

== Notable buildings ==
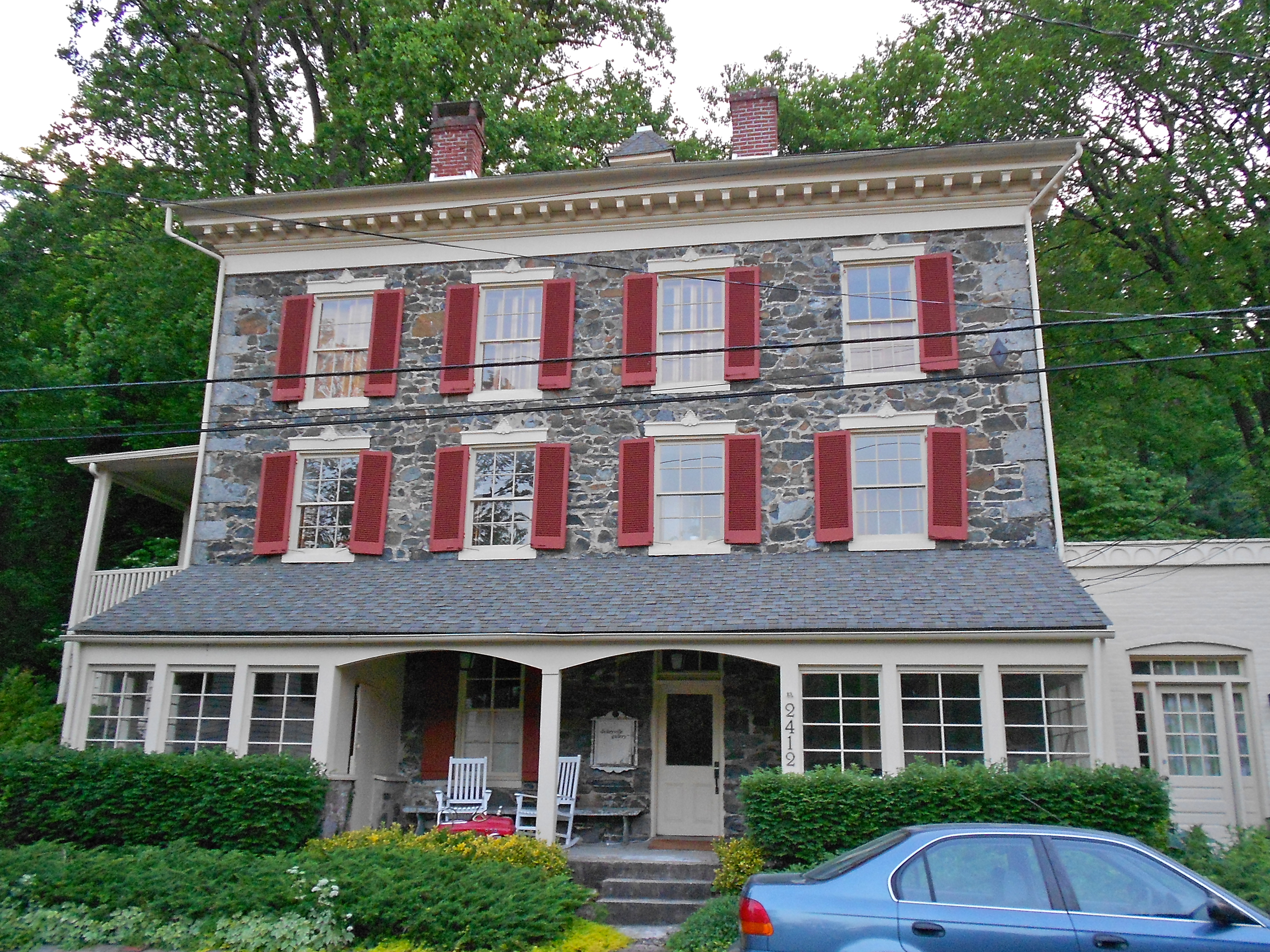
2412 Pickwick Road

The red house at 5131 Wetheredsville Road (built c. 1850) was the home of Billy Ware, who served as a soldier in the Union Army in the American Civil War and carried the colors of his regiment at the Battle of Gettysburg. The stone house at 5123 Wetheredsville Road (built c. 1810) was the home of Enos Humphreys, one of the founders of the Independent Order of Odd Fellows (I.O.O.F.). One of the earliest meeting halls of that fraternal organization is still extant at 2412 Pickwick Road. The Presbyterian church 5116 Wetheredsville was founded in the 1870s and built in 1885. 5111 Wetheredsville was the home of the Ashland Mill superintendent. The springhouse and carriage house that served the property still exist at 2309 and 2305 Pickwick (respectively).

5107 Wetheredsville was built around 1810 and was, for many years, the home of the village lamplighter. The large home at 5101 Wetheredsville is the Mechanics Hall and was built in 1897 as a lodge for the Junior Order of American Mechanics, a union and fraternal organization. The building served as a village meeting hall, a concert hall for vaudeville and minstrel shows, and Madame Jolly's Waxworks, a show based on Madame Tussauds Waxworks in London before conversion to a private residence. A stage and footlights still grace one end of the main hall. Ashland Chapel, in the center of the village at 2331 Pickwick Road, was built on land given by the mill-owning Wethered family in 1849 as a house of worship for mill workers. The chapel, with its plain interior and lack of a slave gallery, became the Methodist Church. the small garden shed at one end of the property was originally a trolley stop. 5029 Wetheredsville (c. 1850) served as a home of the cow for the village dairy and a glove factory. 5027 Wetheredsville is more recent (built in the 1940s) but is known as "Little Mount Vernon" as it was designed to emulate that famous home.

5023 Wetheredsville was built in 1835 and served as the village apothecary and then as a candy store. The smaller homes at each end were built by the storekeeper for his newly married sons. 5016 Wetheredsville was the home of one of the mill-owning Wethereds; next door is the village dispensary and doctor's home, both built around 1840. The open area opposite 5017 was a trolley stop on the old Lorraine streetcar line, the railings are still visible. The nearby home at 5010 was built in 1810 for the Cherry Cough Syrup Co and later served as a tavern and a garage. 5008 Wetheredsville, built around 1865, was originally the village school. The last house on Wetheredsville road is 4901, built in 1865 for the Ashland superintendent, the grounds include the historic location of the Tschudi home. Martin Tshudi founded the first mill in the area around 1762. The graves of his wife and daughter can still be found on the hill. The Ballymena Mill (formerly the Ashland Mill) anchors this end of the village where Wetheredsville Road becomes a hiking and biking trail. The old woolen mill, built c. 1830, now houses commercial tenants.

2322 Pickwick was the home of the village shopkeeper, the old streetcar line ran inches from the corner of the home. 2332 Pickwick (c. 1832) is said to have been an Officers' Quarters at Fort McHenry before the home was moved to Dickeyville. The four-story rubblestone homes at 2411 and 2407 Pickwick date from c. 1860. 2405 Pickwick ( c. 1860) was the village store. The second floor was meeting room for the YWCA. 2415 and 2417 Pickwick date from about 1870 while 2407 and 2411 date from around 1860. 2412 was built in 1853 for one of the first IOOF lodges in the U.S. There was a tin shop in the basement. Later, it became a general store, with a Post Office and gas station. The one-story extension to the right was the pharmacy.

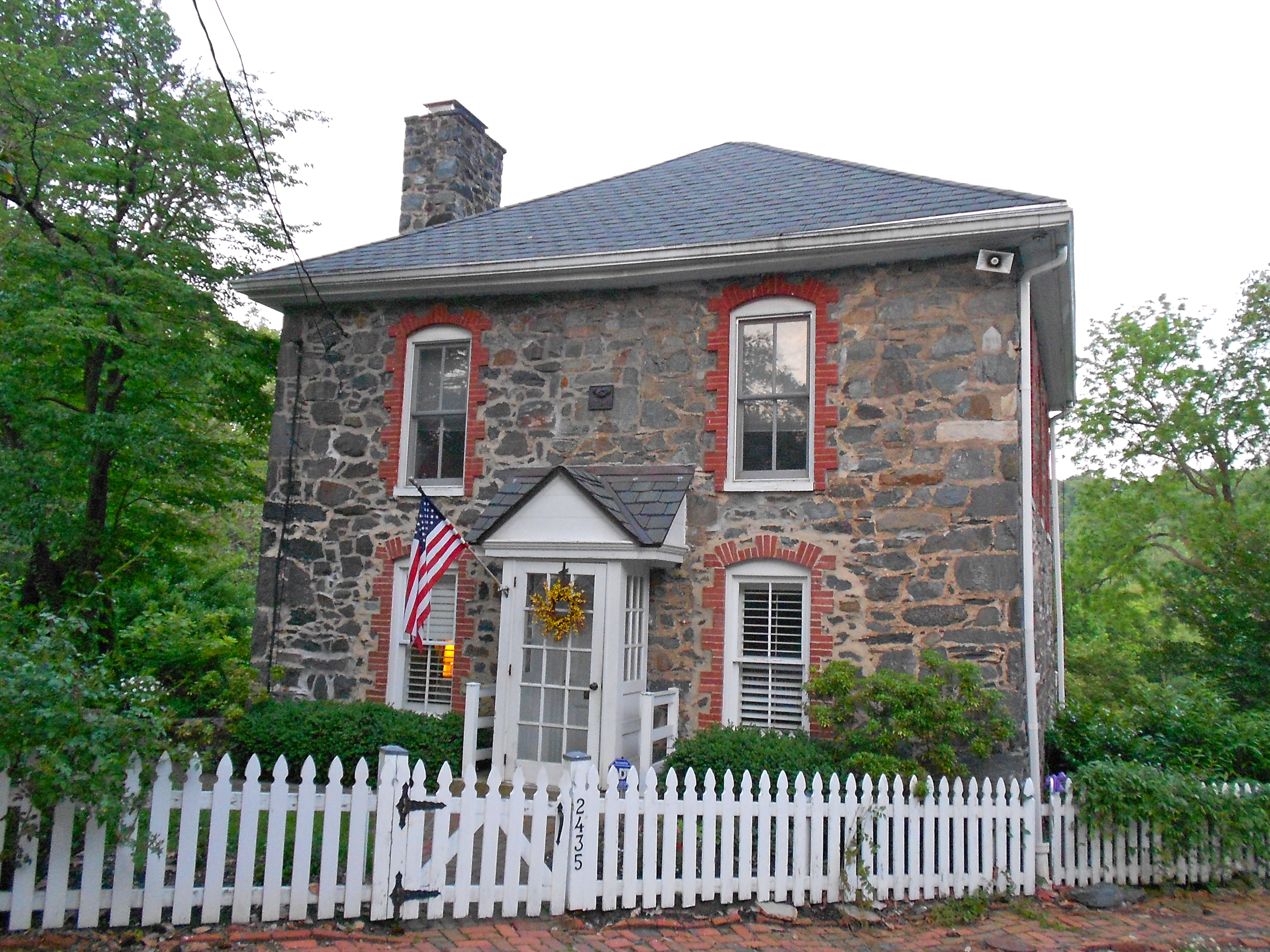
2435 Pickwick Road

2423 Pickwick, built in the General Grant style in 1872, was restored as a studio by noted Baltimore muralist R. McGill Mackall in 1932. He built a complete two-story house inside so that he could live here as well as work. The house has been occupied ever since by artists. The present owner, sculptor Barry Johnston, displays some of his bronze sculptures in the back yard. 2433 Pickwick (c.1875) was the home of Malcolm Moos, an advisor to President Dwight Eisenhower and reportedly had a direct telephone link to the White House. 2435 was built as a mill office in 1840. It also housed the village jail where offenders could be locked up in a windowless room on the first floor. In 1899, Teddy Roosevelt spoke from the wooden front steps (the main entrance to the building, now demolished). 2500 Pickwick is believed to date to 1790 and some say began as an Indian trading post. Known as "The Old Stone Row," the building served as millworker housing.

== Current events ==
The Dickeyville Community Association, the Dickeyville Garden Club and the Dickeyville Poker Club maintain an active schedule of community events. Most noteworthy is the Fourth of July celebration that includes a parade around Ashland Chapel and a dinner-dance on Pickwick Road. A Halloween Bonfire night, Christmas caroling and other holiday events occur through the course of the year. The Garden Club hosts frequent lectures and meetings while the Poker Club continues its own, more recent, tradition of late night poker sessions. The village should not be confused with the "other" Dickeyville; Dickeyville, Wisconsin.
