= Carrollton Viaduct =

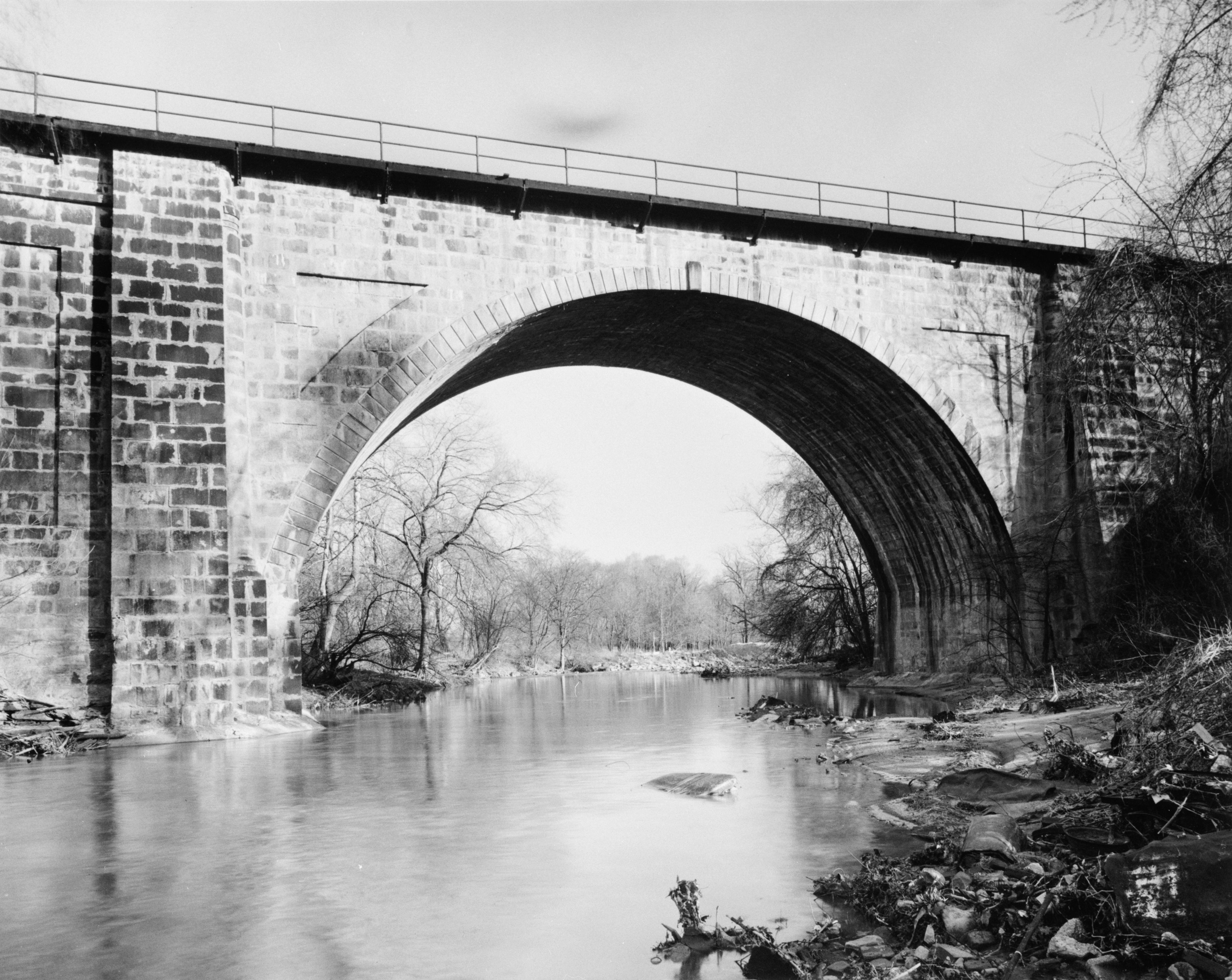
- Carrollton Viaduct over the Gwynns Falls stream in southwest Baltimore, first bridge built 1828–1829 for the Baltimore and Ohio Railroad, founded 1827. Pictured in 1971
- Coordinates: 39°16′31″N 76°39′18″W
- Carries: Railroad
- Crosses: Gwynns Falls
- Locale: Baltimore, Maryland
- Owner: CSX Transportation

Characteristics
- Design: Arch bridge
- Material: Granite
- Total length: 312 feet (95 m)
- Height: 65 feet (20 m)
- Longest span: 80 feet (24 m)
- Clearance below: 51 feet 9 inches (15.8 m)

History
- Construction start: 1828
- Opened: 1829
- Carrollton Viaduct
- U.S. National Register of Historic Places
- U.S. National Historic Landmark
- Location within Baltimore
- Location: Gwynn's Falls near Carroll Park, Baltimore, Maryland
- Coordinates: 39°16′31.5″N 76°39′17.6″W
- Built: 1829
- Architect: James Lloyd; Caspar Wever
- NRHP reference No.: 71001032

Significant dates
- Added to NRHP: November 11, 1971
- Designated NHL: November 11, 1971

Location
- Interactive map of Carrollton Viaduct

The Carrollton Viaduct, spans the Gwynns Falls stream near Carroll Park in southwest Baltimore, Maryland, USA. It is the first stone masonry bridge for railroad use in the United States and was built for the Baltimore and Ohio Railroad, founded in 1827. Construction began in 1828 and was completed in 1829. It remains the oldest such bridge still in service in the United States.

The bridge is named in honor of Charles Carroll of Carrollton (1737–1832), of Maryland, known for being the last surviving signer of the Declaration of Independence, the only Roman Catholic in the Second Continental Congress (1775–1781), and wealthiest man in the Thirteen Colonies of the time of the American Revolutionary War (1775–1783).

In 1971, the Carrollton Viaduct was designated a National Historic Landmark and listed on the National Register of Historic Places. It was designated a National Historic Civil Engineering Landmark by the American Society of Civil Engineers in 1982 and is now owned and operated by CSX Transportation.

== Description ==
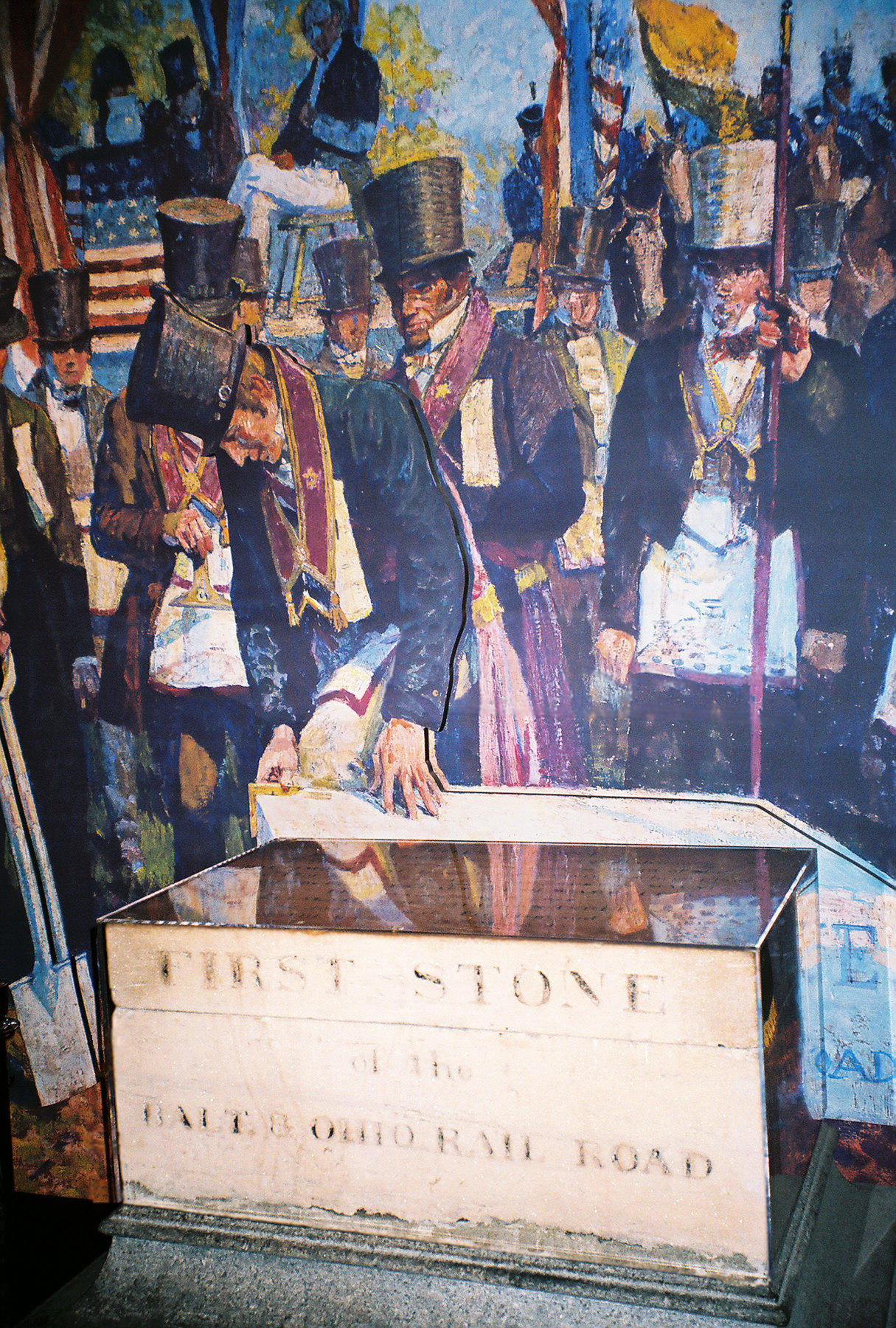
Laying of the cornerstone of the B&O.

The bridge is currently one of the world's oldest railroad bridges still in use for rail traffic, carrying loads far greater than originally envisioned. It was named after Charles Carroll of Carrollton (1737–1832), the last living signer of the Declaration of Independence and a director of the Baltimore and Ohio Railroad, who laid the cornerstone on July 4, 1828. As he laid the first stone he said, "I consider this among the most important acts of my life, second only to my signing the Declaration of Independence." Builder Caspar Wever and designer James Lloyd completed the structure for the railroad in November 1829, at an officially listed cost of $58,106.73 (equal to $1,756,821 today). The actual cost of the construction may have been as high as $100,000.

The bridge, 312 feet (95 m) in length, rises from its foundations about 65 feet (20 m). It is 51 feet 9 inches (15.8 m) above Gwynns Falls. It consists of a full-centered arch with a clear span length of 80 feet (24 m) over the stream, and a space for two railroad tracks on its deck. To provide an underpass for a wagon road, an arched passageway, 16 feet (5 m) in width, was built through one of the masonry-walled approaches. Originally planned as one arch of 40 feet (12 m) chord, the dimensions were enlarged to quiet the concern of the proprietor of the mills located immediately above the bridge site, who feared that 40 feet would be insufficient if the stream was flooded. The heavy granite blocks which form the arches and exterior walls were procured from Ellicott's Mills and Port Deposit. A temporary wooden framework supporting the central span held 1,500 tons (1,360 tonnes) of this stone during construction. A white cornerstone at one end of the bridge bears the inscription "James Lloyd of Maryland, Builder A.D. 1829."

Andrew Jackson, the first President of the United States to ride on a railroad train, crossed the bridge on a trip between Ellicott's Mills and Baltimore on June 6, 1833. The Carrollton Viaduct has provided continual service to the Baltimore and Ohio Railroad and its modern corporate successor, CSX Transportation.

The viaduct was designated a National Historic Landmark on November 11, 1971 and was administratively listed on the National Register of Historic Places the same day.

In 1982 the viaduct was designated a National Historic Civil Engineering Landmark by the American Society of Civil Engineers.

== See also ==
- Baltimore Terminal Subdivision
- List of bridges documented by the Historic American Engineering Record in Maryland
- List of bridges on the National Register of Historic Places in Maryland
- List of National Historic Landmarks in Maryland
- National Register of Historic Places listings in South and Southeast Baltimore
- Skerne Bridge (World's oldest railroad bridge still in use for rail traffic)
