= Kefauver Place =

- U.S. National Register of Historic Places
- Location within Maryland Location within the United States
- Location: 20515 Park Hall Rd., Rohrersville, Maryland
- Coordinates: 39°27′1″N 77°39′14″W
- Area: 21 acres (8.5 ha)
- Architectural style: Federal
- NRHP reference No.: 05000908
- Added to NRHP: August 26, 2005

Kefauver Place is a historic farm complex located at Rohrersville, Washington County, Maryland, United States. It includes a log cabin built about 1820; a log barn of about 1830 with later-19th-century additions; a 19th-century timber-framed corn crib; a two-story brick house constructed around 1880; an early-20th-century masonry root cellar; and a frame summer kitchen, hog pen, chicken house, and garage all dating from about 1930. Also on the property are two fieldstone spring enclosures. It is located on a 21-acre (85,000 m^{2}) property.

Kefauver Place was listed on the National Register of Historic Places in 2005.
