= Baltimore Choral Arts Society =

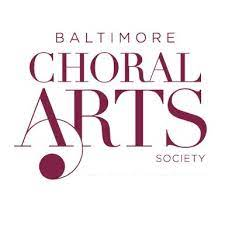
Logo

The Baltimore Choral Arts Society is a music organization in Baltimore, Maryland that manages a full orchestra, a chorus and a chamber chorus.

== Social media ==
- Official website
- Baltimore Choral Arts on Facebook
