= Gwynns Falls =

Stream located in Maryland

Coordinates: 39°16′42″N 76°39′40″W

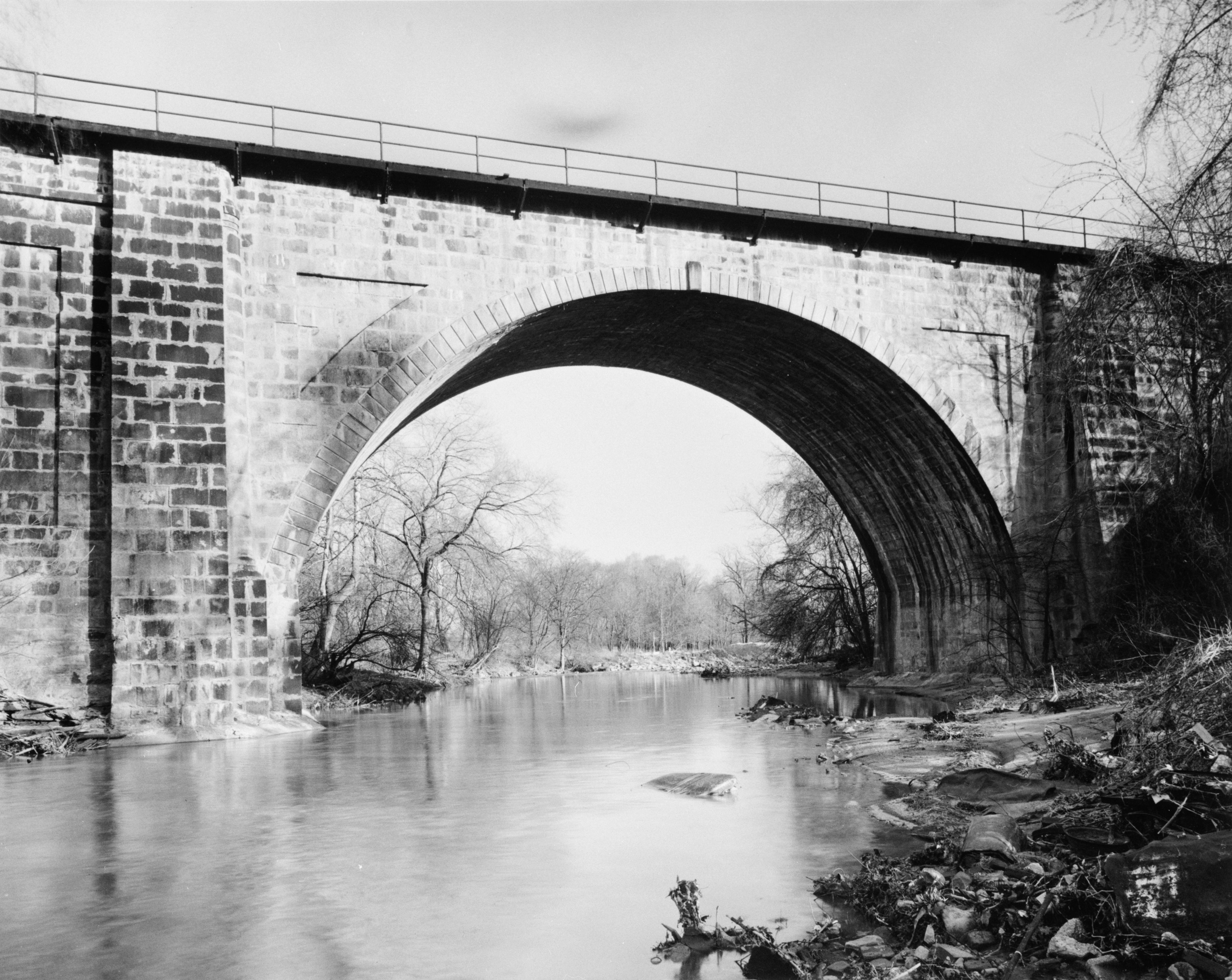
Gwynn Falls flowing under the Carrollton Viaduct

Gwynns Falls is a 24.9-mile-long (40.1 km) stream located in Baltimore County and Baltimore City, Maryland. Its headwaters are located in Reisterstown in Baltimore County, and the stream flows southeast, entering the city of Baltimore and emptying into the Middle Branch of the Patapsco River. The Patapsco drains into the Chesapeake Bay. The watershed area of Gwynns Falls covers 66 square miles (170 km^{2}), with 133 miles (214 km) of streams.

The stream was named for Richard Gwinn, who opened a trading post along it in 1669. Gwynns Falls does not actually have a waterfall, but its rough, rocky nature caused John Smith to comment on how the stream tumbled over "felles". This confusing local practice of using "falls" in the name of rocky streams was also applied to Baltimore's Jones Falls and Gunpowder Falls, which do not have waterfalls.

During periods of high water conditions the stream can be whitewater kayaked, with the most challenging section running from the dam in Dickeyville to the Washington Boulevard bridge crossing. This section is entirely within the city limits of Baltimore and runs under the historic Carrollton Viaduct. An unusual feature of the run is a point near U.S. Route 40 where a city water pipe main crosses about a foot above the water level; kayaking normally requires a portage around the pipe crossing.

== See also ==
- List of Maryland rivers
- Dickeyville Historic District
- Gwynns Falls Leakin Park
