= Rohrersville Cornet Band =

Maryland cornet band

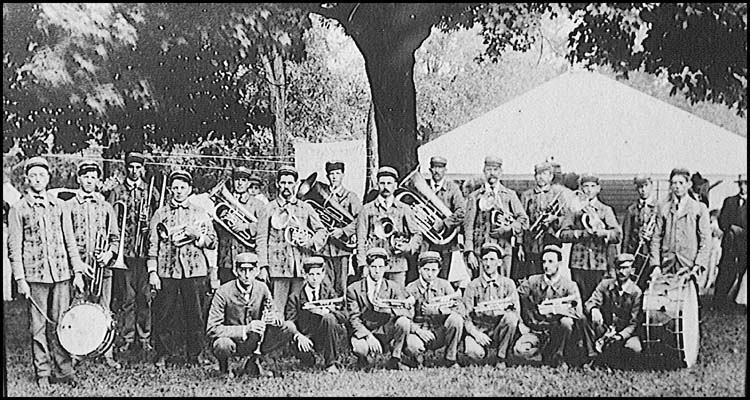
The Rohrersville Cornet Band is the oldest community band in continuous service in the state

The Rohrersville Cornet Band, part of Maryland's cornet band heritage, claims to be the oldest continually-performing community band in the state, having been founded in 1837; it now performs in a dedicated music hall in Rohrersville, Maryland.
