= Brownsville, Maryland =

- Census-designated place
- Location of Brownsville in Maryland
- Coordinates: 39°22′32″N 77°39′52″W
- Country: United States
- State: Maryland
- County: Washington

Area
  - Total: 0.28 sq mi (0.73 km^{2})
  - Land: 0.28 sq mi (0.73 km^{2})
  - Water: 0 sq mi (0.00 km^{2})
- Elevation: 568 ft (173 m)

Population (2020)
  - Total: 102
  - Density: 360.3/sq mi (139.12/km^{2})
- Time zone: UTC−5 (Eastern (EST))
  - Summer (DST): UTC−4 (EDT)
- ZIP code: 21715
- Area codes: 301, 240
- FIPS code: 24-24043
- GNIS feature ID: 2583591

Brownsville (also Banjotown) is an unincorporated community and census-designated place in Washington County, Maryland, United States, near Gapland in an area known as Pleasant Valley. Its population was 89 as of the 2010 census.

== History ==
Tobias Brown, son of Rudolph Brown, was one of the first settlers of Washington County, and owned a tract of farmland extending from Gapland, south to the future location of Brownsville. John Brown, son of Tobias, and his son Cornelius established a tannery in the swamp land at the head of a small tributary to Israel Creek, and built a home on the east side of the valley overlooking the tannery. The town was named for the family. The first post office in Brownsville was established January 28, 1833, with John H. Beall as postmaster. He was succeeded on February 3, 1836, by John Brown, who was born near Brownsville, December 20, 1790, served as a soldier in the War of 1812 and saw action at the Battle of North Point. After the war, in 1824, he built the first homestead in what is now Brownsville, of timbers pre-cut in Hagerstown, and brought to the site by wagon, using hand-made bricks to fill in between the timber framing, and covered by weatherboard cut by hand from South Mountain trees. John Brown served as postmaster until 1863, when he was succeeded by his son, Cornelius, who (with a break in 1886–89) served until February 1894. Cornelius's son, George T. Brown, was appointed to the post in February 1898 and held it for over 40 years.

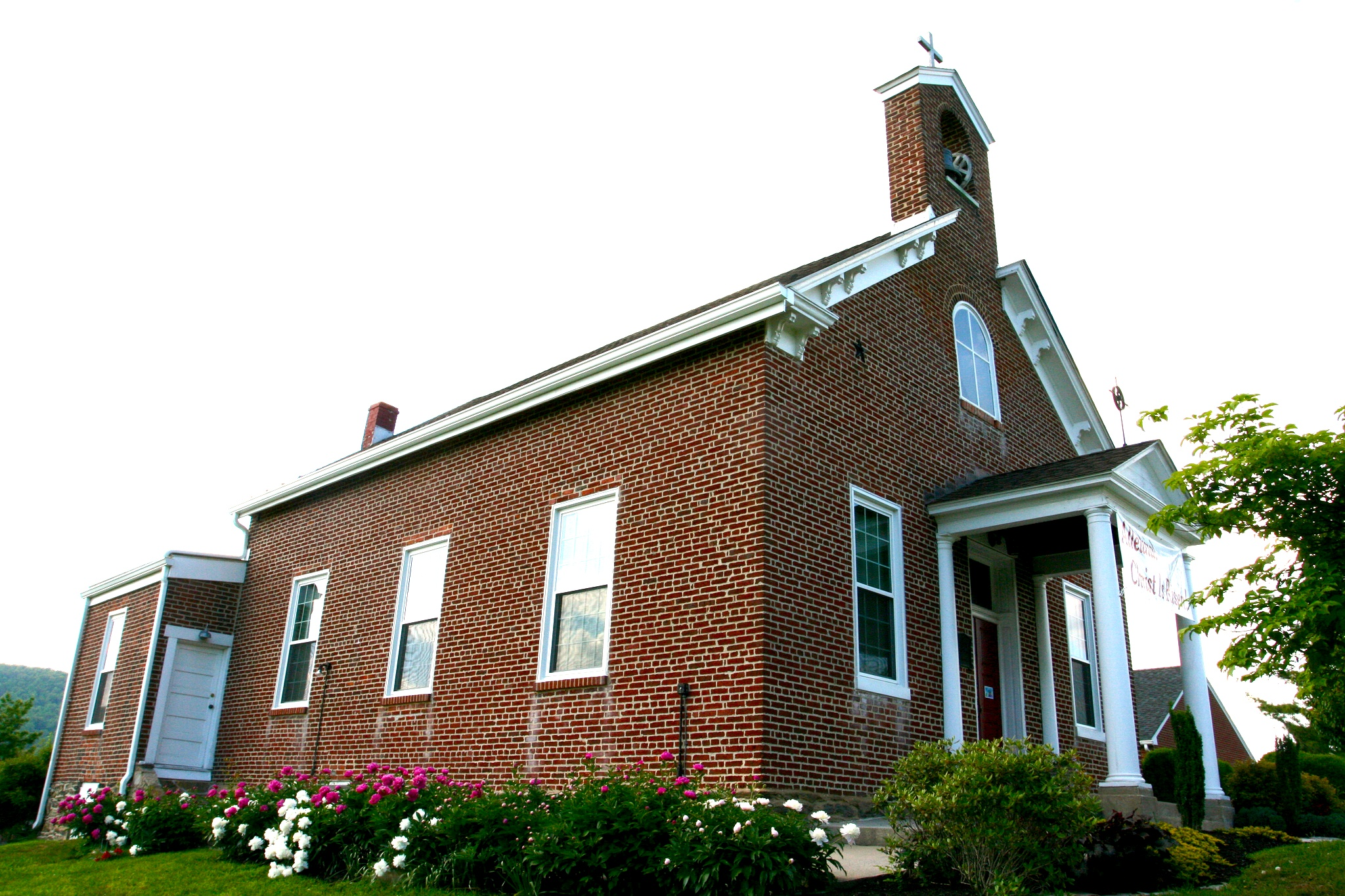
St. Luke's Episcopal Church

Two churches were founded in Brownsville. The Church of the Brethren was founded by Rudolph Brown in the years following the close of the Revolutionary War. A meetinghouse was erected in the village in 1852 and served the congregation until the building of their present church along MD 67 in 1960. Two additional congregations were founded from the Brownsville Church: West Brownsville at Yarrowsburg (1907–60) and South Brownsville at Garretts Mill (1914–60). Both of these congregations were re-joined to the Brownsville Church in 1960. St. Luke's Episcopal Church was organized August 21, 1837 as a chapel within St. Mark's Parish. The brick church was erected in 1839 and continues to serve the congregation today. During the Civil War, the church was used as a field hospital following the Battle of Antietam. Afterwards, it was burned by the Union Army to prevent Confederates from using the structure given its proximity to the border line at the Potomac River. The church was restored in 1869.

== Demographics ==
Historical population
Census	Pop.	Note	%±
2020	102		—
U.S. Decennial Census
