= Weverton, Maryland =

Unincorporated community in Maryland, U.S.

Coordinates: 39°19′58″N 77°40′54″W

Weverton is an unincorporated community hamlet located in the southern tip of Washington County, Maryland, United States, near the north shore of the Potomac River. Its population is about 500. Weverton is located at the intersection of MD Route 67 and U.S. Route 340. The nearest incorporated communities are Harpers Ferry, West Virginia (1.5 miles (2.4 km) to the west) and Brunswick ( 2.7 miles (4.3 km) to the east). Weverton's approximate elevation is 410 feet (120 m) above sea level.

Weverton Cliffs, at the southern end of South Mountain where that ridge is interrupted by the Potomac River, are a landmark on the Appalachian Trail; they sit nearly at the halfway point of the trail and are well-known to through hikers.

Weverton is the northwestern end of CSX Transportation's Metropolitan Subdivision, a 79-mile rail line that runs to Washington, D.C.

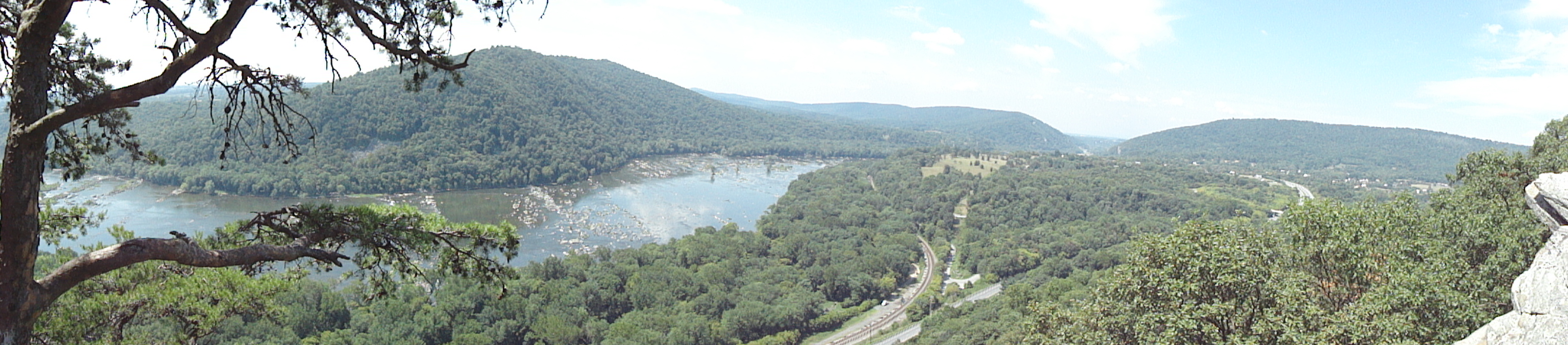
Panoramic view of the Potomac River taken from Weverton Cliffs looking west/southwest

== History ==
Founded in the 1820s, Weverton was a speculative venture intended to be a mill town to use the waterpower of the Potomac and transportation provided by the Chesapeake and Ohio Canal. The community was the creation of Caspar Wever, a chief construction engineer for the Baltimore and Ohio Railroad and a specialist in masonry arch bridges, some of which are still in use. Later on, speculative land sales collapsed and floods washed out a file-making factory and other businesses.

Several houses in the area predate the Civil War. During the war, several skimishes took place in the area and various forces passes through, including units involved in the Battle of South Mountain and the Battle of Antietam.

The community that remains has little connection with the original site of Weverton, which now lies partly under the CSX Transportation right-of-way and partly under the present right-of-way of U.S. Route 340. Weverton had a post office until 1951, when it was removed and consolidated with the Knoxville post office in adjacent Frederick County.

== Geology ==
A USDA soil series, called the Weverton Series, describes a soil typical of ridges in the upper Blue Ridge Mountains, comprising flaggy loams and a topsoil of hardwood detritus.
