= Maryland Public Secondary Schools Athletic Association =

US athletic association

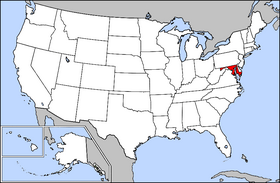
- Abbreviation: MPSSAA
- Formation: 1946; 80 years ago
- Type: Volunteer; NPO
- Legal status: Association
- Headquarters: Nancy Grassmick Building, Maryland State Department of Education, 200 West Baltimore Street; Baltimore, Maryland 21201
- Region served: Maryland
- Members: 200 public high schools
- Executive Director: Edward F. Sparks
- Affiliations: National Federation of State High School Associations
- Website: mpssaa.org

The Maryland Public Secondary Schools Athletic Association (MPSSAA) is the organization that oversees interscholastic athletics for public high schools in the U.S. state of Maryland. Founded in 1946, the association operates under the authority of the Maryland State Department of Education and Maryland's 24 local public school systems.

The MPSSAA currently consists of 200 member public high schools and administers state championship competition in sports throughout the fall, winter and spring seasons. For administrative and tournament purposes, the association divides the state into nine geographic districts.

The association was founded in 1946 as Maryland developed a statewide structure for public-school interscholastic athletics. Its constitution was formally adopted on April 21, 1951. Since its establishment, the organization has continued to oversee athletic regulations, classifications and state championship tournaments for Maryland public secondary schools.

Baltimore City's public high schools became part of the MPSSAA in 1993 after withdrawing from the Maryland Scholastic Association, the longtime athletic organization that had included both Baltimore-area public and private schools.

== Sponsored sports ==
The MPSSAA sponsors state championship competition in 26 sports.

=== Fall ===
- Cross country (boys and girls)
- Field hockey (girls)
- Football (boys)
- Girls' flag football
- Golf
- Soccer (boys and girls)
- Volleyball (girls)

=== Winter ===
- Basketball (boys and girls)
- Indoor track and field (boys and girls)
- Swimming and diving (boys and girls)
- Wrestling

=== Spring ===
- Baseball (boys)
- Lacrosse (boys and girls)
- Softball (girls)
- Tennis (boys and girls)
- Track and field (boys and girls)

== Football ==
The MPSSAA has conducted a state championship tournament in football since 1974. From 1974 through 1987, the state tournament used the classifications Class AA, A, B and C. Beginning in 1988, the classifications were renamed Class 4A, 3A, 2A and 1A, respectively, with Class 4A representing the largest schools and Class 1A the smallest.

The structure of the football postseason has changed several times. From 1974 through 1984, the tournament consisted of state semifinals and championship games. State quarterfinals were added in 1985 and remained part of the tournament through 2002. Beginning in 2003, the postseason was reorganized around regional competition. The playoff format was expanded again in 2021 as part of the move to six football classifications.

The football state tournament currently consists of six classifications: Class 4A, 4A/3A, 3A, 2A, 2A/1A and 1A.

=== State tournament format ===
Each of the six football classifications is divided into four regions: East, North, South and West. At the conclusion of the regular season, eight teams from each region qualify for the postseason according to the MPSSAA point system. Two rounds of regional play reduce each region to two remaining teams.

The two remaining teams from each region advance to the state quarterfinals, producing an eight-team statewide field in each classification. The quarterfinalists are reseeded from No. 1 through No. 8 based on the regular-season point system. The winners advance to the state semifinals and championship game.

=== State champions ===
From 1974 through 1987, the MPSSAA football championships were contested in Classes AA, A, B and C.

Year	Class AA	Class A	Class B	Class C
1974	Parkdale	Friendly	Howard	Valley
1975	Arundel	Fort Hill	Paint Branch	Joppatowne
1976	Churchill	Largo	Seneca Valley	Smithsburg
1977	Churchill	Seneca Valley	Kennedy	Valley
1978	Annapolis	Friendly	Allegany	Havre de Grace
1979	Springbrook	Seneca Valley	Cambridge-South Dorchester	Smithsburg
1980	Springbrook	Seneca Valley	Allegany	Snow Hill
1981	Springbrook	Richard Montgomery	Damascus	Havre de Grace
1982	Oxon Hill	Thomas Johnson	James M. Bennett	Snow Hill
1983	Friendly	McDonough	Allegany	James M. Bennett
1984	Randallstown	Kennedy	Magruder	Smithsburg
1985	Springbrook	McDonough	Wilde Lake	James M. Bennett
1986	Gaithersburg	Magruder	Lackey	Havre de Grace
1987	Seneca Valley	Laurel	Walkersville	Milford Mill

From 1988 through 2019, the state championships were contested in Classes 4A, 3A, 2A and 1A. No MPSSAA football championships were held in 2020.

Year	Class 4A	Class 3A	Class 2A	Class 1A
1988	Springbrook	DuVal	Allegany	Smithsburg
1989	Springbrook	Linganore	Allegany	Kent County
1990	Randallstown	McDonough	Wilde Lake	Kent County
1991	Quince Orchard	Linganore	Allegany	Wilde Lake
1992	Gaithersburg	Seneca Valley	Damascus	Wilde Lake
1993	Watkins Mill	Seneca Valley	Damascus	Boonsboro
1994	North County	Seneca Valley	Dunbar	Smithsburg
1995	Sherwood	Dunbar	Linganore	Cambridge-South Dorchester
1996	Sherwood	Damascus	Wheaton	Cambridge-South Dorchester
1997	Seneca Valley	Wilde Lake	Fort Hill	Hereford
1998	Seneca Valley	Friendly	Urbana	Oakland Mills
1999	Eleanor Roosevelt	Seneca Valley	Urbana	Forestville
2000	Gaithersburg	Calvert	Urbana	Elkton
2001	Bowie	Urbana	Hereford	Allegany
2002	Parkdale	Seneca Valley	Hereford	Bohemia Manor
2003	Damascus	Linganore	Aberdeen	Joppatowne
2004	Suitland	Northwest	Potomac	Dunbar
2005	Damascus	Gwynn Park	Potomac	Allegany
2006	Suitland	Friendly	Edmondson	Dunbar
2007	Quince Orchard	Damascus	River Hill	Dunbar
2008	Sherwood	Westlake	River Hill	Dunbar
2009	Old Mill	Linganore	Eastern Technical	Catoctin
2010	Urbana	Wilde Lake	McDonough	Dunbar
2011	Old Mill	River Hill	Middletown	Dunbar
2012	Dr. Henry A. Wise Jr.	River Hill	Middletown	Dunbar
2013	Northwest	Franklin	Middletown	Fort Hill
2014	Northwest	Franklin	Frederick Douglass	Fort Hill
2015	Dr. Henry A. Wise Jr.	Damascus	Patuxent	Fort Hill
2016	Dr. Henry A. Wise Jr.	Damascus	Walkersville	Fort Hill
2017	Dr. Henry A. Wise Jr.	Linganore	Damascus	Dunbar
2018	Quince Orchard	Franklin	Oakdale	Fort Hill
2019	Dr. Henry A. Wise Jr.	Damascus	Middletown	Catoctin
2020	No championship held			

Beginning in 2021, the MPSSAA expanded the football tournament to six classifications: 4A, 4A/3A, 3A, 2A, 2A/1A and 1A.

Year	Class 4A	Class 4A/3A	Class 3A	Class 2A	Class 2A/1A	Class 1A
2021	Quince Orchard	Mergenthaler Vo-Tech	Northern-Calvert	Frederick Douglass	Dunbar	Fort Hill
2022	Quince Orchard	North Point	Damascus	Milford Mill Academy	Dunbar	Fort Hill
2023	Dr. Henry A. Wise Jr.	Mergenthaler Vo-Tech	Oakdale	Stephen Decatur High School	Dunbar	Fort Hill
2024	Quince Orchard	North Point	Arundel	Stephen Decatur High School	Patuxent High School	Fort Hill
2025	Quince Orchard	Mergenthaler Vo-Tech	Linganore	Huntingtown	Dunbar	Patuxent High School

=== Championships by school ===
The following table lists MPSSAA football state championships won by school since the state tournament began in 1974.

School	Championships	Championship years
Dunbar	14	1994, 1995, 2004, 2006, 2007, 2008, 2010, 2011, 2012, 2017, 2021, 2022, 2023, 2025
Damascus High School	12	1981, 1992, 1993, 1996, 2003, 2005, 2007, 2015, 2016, 2017, 2019, 2022
Seneca Valley	12	1976, 1977, 1979, 1980, 1987, 1992, 1993, 1994, 1997, 1998, 1999, 2002
Fort Hill High School	11	1975, 1997, 2013, 2014, 2015, 2016, 2018, 2021, 2022, 2023, 2024
Allegany High School	8	1978, 1980, 1983, 1988, 1989, 1991, 2001, 2005
Linganore High School	7	1989, 1991, 1995, 2003, 2009, 2017, 2025
Quince Orchard High School	7	1991, 2007, 2018, 2021, 2022, 2024, 2025
Springbrook High School	6	1979, 1980, 1981, 1985, 1988, 1989
Wilde Lake High School	6	1985, 1990, 1991, 1992, 1997, 2010
Dr. Henry A. Wise Jr.	6	2012, 2015, 2016, 2017, 2019, 2023
Friendly High School	5	1974, 1978, 1983, 1998, 2006
Smithsburg High School	5	1976, 1979, 1984, 1988, 1994
Urbana	5	1998, 1999, 2000, 2001, 2010
McDonough	4	1983, 1985, 1990, 2010
Middletown	4	2011, 2012, 2013, 2019
River Hill High School	4	2007, 2008, 2011, 2012
Cambridge-South Dorchester High School	3	1979, 1995, 1996
Franklin	3	2013, 2014, 2018
Gaithersburg High School	3	1986, 1992, 2000
Havre de Grace High School	3	1978, 1981, 1986
Hereford	3	1997, 2001, 2002
James M. Bennett High School	3	1982, 1983, 1985
Mergenthaler Vo-Tech	3	2021, 2023, 2025
Northwest	3	2004, 2013, 2014
Patuxent High School	3	2015, 2024, 2025
Sherwood	3	1995, 1996, 2008

Schools with two or one championships are included in the year-by-year championship tables above.

== Member high schools ==
MPSSAA member schools are organized into nine geographic districts for administrative and postseason purposes. Schools compete through a combination of multi-jurisdiction athletic conferences and leagues administered by individual local school systems.

=== Classifications ===
The MPSSAA divides member schools into classifications to promote competitive balance in state championship competition. Classifications are primarily based on actual enrollment in grades 9 through 11, with enrollment figures submitted by each local school system. Schools are generally divided as equally as possible among four classifications, with Class 1A consisting of the smallest schools and Class 4A the largest.

Classification and regional alignment may vary by sport. The MPSSAA adopts sport-specific classification and regional alignments for two-year cycles. The current alignment cycle covers the 2025–2027 academic years.

Football differs from the standard four-class format and currently conducts state championship competition in six classifications: 1A, 2A/1A, 2A, 3A, 4A/3A and 4A.

=== District alignment ===
For administrative purposes, the MPSSAA divides Maryland into nine geographic districts.

- District 1 – Allegany, Carroll, Frederick, Garrett, and Washington counties
- District 2 – Montgomery County
- District 3 – Prince George's County
- District 4 – Calvert, Charles, and St. Mary's counties
- District 5 – Anne Arundel and Howard counties
- District 6 – Baltimore County
- District 7 – Cecil and Harford counties
- District 8 – Caroline, Dorchester, Kent, Queen Anne's, Somerset, Talbot, Wicomico, and Worcester counties
- District 9 – Baltimore City

=== Conferences and leagues ===
MPSSAA member schools compete in a combination of multi-jurisdiction athletic conferences and leagues organized by individual local school systems. Several conferences include schools from multiple Maryland counties, while larger jurisdictions operate county or city athletic leagues.

==== Appalachian Mountain Athletic Conference ====
Allegany County

- Allegany High School
- Fort Hill High School
- Mountain Ridge High School

Garrett County

- Northern Garrett High School
- Southern Garrett High School

==== Bayside Conference ====
Caroline County

- Colonel Richardson High School
- North Caroline High School

Dorchester County

- Cambridge-South Dorchester High School
- North Dorchester High School

Kent County

- Kent County High School

Queen Anne's County

- Kent Island High School
- Queen Anne's County High School

Somerset County

- Crisfield High School
- Washington High School

Talbot County

- Easton High School
- St. Michaels High School

Wicomico County

- James M. Bennett High School
- Mardela Middle and High School
- Parkside High School
- Wicomico High School

Worcester County

- Pocomoke High School
- Snow Hill High School
- Stephen Decatur High School

==== Central Maryland Conference ====
The Central Maryland Conference (CMC) includes public high schools from Frederick and Washington counties. The conference was formed in 2015, replacing the former Monocacy Valley Athletic League. Washington County schools subsequently joined the conference, with Clear Spring becoming a full conference member in most sports in 2023.

Beginning with the 2027–28 school year, Carroll County Public Schools are scheduled to join the Central Maryland Conference.

Antietam Division

- Boonsboro High School
- Catoctin High School
- Clear Spring High School
- Smithsburg High School

Gambrill Division

- Brunswick High School
- Middletown High School
- Walkersville High School
- Williamsport High School

Potomac Division

- Linganore High School
- North Hagerstown High School
- Oakdale High School
- South Hagerstown High School

Spires Division

- Frederick High School
- Governor Thomas Johnson High School
- Tuscarora High School
- Urbana High School

==== Southern Maryland Athletic Conference ====
Calvert County

- Calvert High School
- Huntingtown High School
- Northern High School
- Patuxent High School

Charles County

- Henry E. Lackey High School
- La Plata High School
- Maurice J. McDonough High School
- North Point High School
- St. Charles High School
- Thomas Stone High School
- Westlake High School

St. Mary's County

- Chopticon High School
- Great Mills High School
- Leonardtown High School

==== Upper Chesapeake Bay Athletic Conference ====
The Upper Chesapeake Bay Athletic Conference (UCBAC) consists of public high schools in Cecil and Harford counties. The conference is divided into three divisions: Conowingo, Hatem and Tydings.

Conowingo Division

- Bohemia Manor High School
- Elkton High School
- North East High School
- Perryville High School
- Rising Sun High School

Hatem Division

- C. Milton Wright High School
- Edgewood High School
- Harford Technical High School
- Havre de Grace High School
- North Harford High School

Tydings Division

- Aberdeen High School
- Bel Air High School
- Fallston High School
- Joppatowne High School
- Patterson Mill High School

=== Local school system leagues ===
==== Anne Arundel County League ====
- Annapolis High School
- Arundel High School
- Broadneck High School
- Chesapeake High School
- Chesapeake Science Point
- Crofton High School
- Glen Burnie High School
- Meade High School
- North County High School
- Northeast High School
- Old Mill High School
- Severn Run High School
- Severna Park High School
- South River High School
- Southern High School

==== Baltimore City League ====
- Academy for College and Career Exploration
- Augusta Fells Savage Institute of Visual Arts
- Baltimore City College
- Baltimore Leadership School for Young Women
- Baltimore Polytechnic Institute
- Benjamin Franklin High School at Masonville Cove
- Carver Vocational-Technical High School
- City Neighbors High School
- ConneXions: A Community Based Arts School
- Coppin Academy
- Digital Harbor High School
- Edmondson-Westside High School
- Forest Park High School
- Frederick Douglass High School
- Green Street Academy
- Lake Clifton
- Mergenthaler Vocational-Technical High School
- National Academy Foundation
- Patterson High School
- Paul Laurence Dunbar High School
- REACH! Partnership School
- Reginald F. Lewis High School
- Renaissance Academy
- The SEED School of Maryland
- Vivien T. Thomas Medical Arts Academy
- Western High School

==== Baltimore County League ====
- Carver Center for Arts and Technology
- Catonsville High School
- Chesapeake High School
- Dulaney High School
- Dundalk High School
- Eastern Technical High School
- Franklin High School
- Hereford High School
- Kenwood High School
- Lansdowne High School
- Loch Raven High School
- Milford Mill Academy
- New Town High School
- Overlea High School
- Owings Mills High School
- Parkville High School
- Patapsco High School and Center for the Arts
- Perry Hall High School
- Pikesville High School
- Randallstown High School
- Sparrows Point High School
- Towson High School
- Western School of Technology
- Woodlawn High School

==== Howard County League ====
- Atholton High School
- Centennial High School
- Glenelg High School
- Guilford Park High School
- Hammond High School
- Howard High School
- Long Reach High School
- Marriotts Ridge High School
- Mount Hebron High School
- Oakland Mills High School
- Reservoir High School
- River Hill High School
- Wilde Lake High School

==== Montgomery County League ====
- Bethesda-Chevy Chase High School
- Montgomery Blair High School
- James Hubert Blake High School
- Winston Churchill High School
- Clarksburg High School
- Damascus High School
- Albert Einstein High School
- Gaithersburg High School
- Walter Johnson High School
- John F. Kennedy High School
- Col. Zadok Magruder High School
- Richard Montgomery High School
- Northwest High School
- Northwood High School
- Paint Branch High School
- Poolesville High School
- Quince Orchard High School
- Rockville High School
- Seneca Valley High School
- Sherwood High School
- Springbrook High School
- Watkins Mill High School
- Wheaton High School
- Walt Whitman High School
- Thomas Sprigg Wootton High School

==== Prince George's County League ====
- Bladensburg High School
- Bowie High School
- Central High School
- Charles Herbert Flowers High School
- Crossland High School
- Dr. Henry A. Wise Jr. High School
- DuVal High School
- Eleanor Roosevelt High School
- Fairmont Heights High School
- Frederick Douglass High School
- Friendly High School
- Gwynn Park High School
- High Point High School
- International High School at Langley Park
- International High School at Largo
- Largo High School
- Laurel High School
- Northwestern High School
- Oxon Hill High School
- Parkdale High School
- Potomac High School
- Suitland High School
- Surrattsville High School

== See also ==
- Maryland Interscholastic Athletic Association — a boys' sports conference for private high schools generally located in the Baltimore metropolitan area
- Interscholastic Athletic Association of Maryland — an association of schools that organizes the female athletic programs in the Baltimore metropolitan area
- Washington Catholic Athletic Conference — an association of Catholic schools in the Washington, D.C. metropolitan area, which also includes schools in Maryland and Virginia
