= Maryland Route 66 =

State highway in Washington County, Maryland, US

Maryland Route 66
- Maryland Route 66 highlighted in red

Route information
- Maintained by MDSHA and Town of Smithsburg
- Length: 12.84 mi (20.66 km)
- Existed: 1927–present

Major junctions
- South end: US 40 Alt. in Boonsboro
- US 40 in Beaver Creek; I-70 in Beaver Creek; MD 64 in Cavetown
- North end: MD 64 near Smithsburg

Location
- Country: United States
- State: Maryland
- Counties: Washington

Highway system
- Maryland highway system; Interstate; US; State; Scenic Byways
← MD 65	→ MD 67

Maryland Route 66 (MD 66) is a state highway in the U.S. state of Maryland. Known for most of its length as Mapleville Road, the state highway runs 12.84 miles (20.66 km) from U.S. Route 40 Alternate (US 40 Alternate) in Boonsboro north to MD 64 near Smithsburg. MD 66 parallels the western flank of South Mountain in eastern Washington County, connecting Boonsboro and Smithsburg with Interstate 70 (I-70) and US 40. MD 66 was constructed in the late 1920s and early 1930s from Boonsboro to Cavetown. The state highway was extended north through Smithsburg after MD 64 bypassed the town in the late 1950s.

== Route description ==
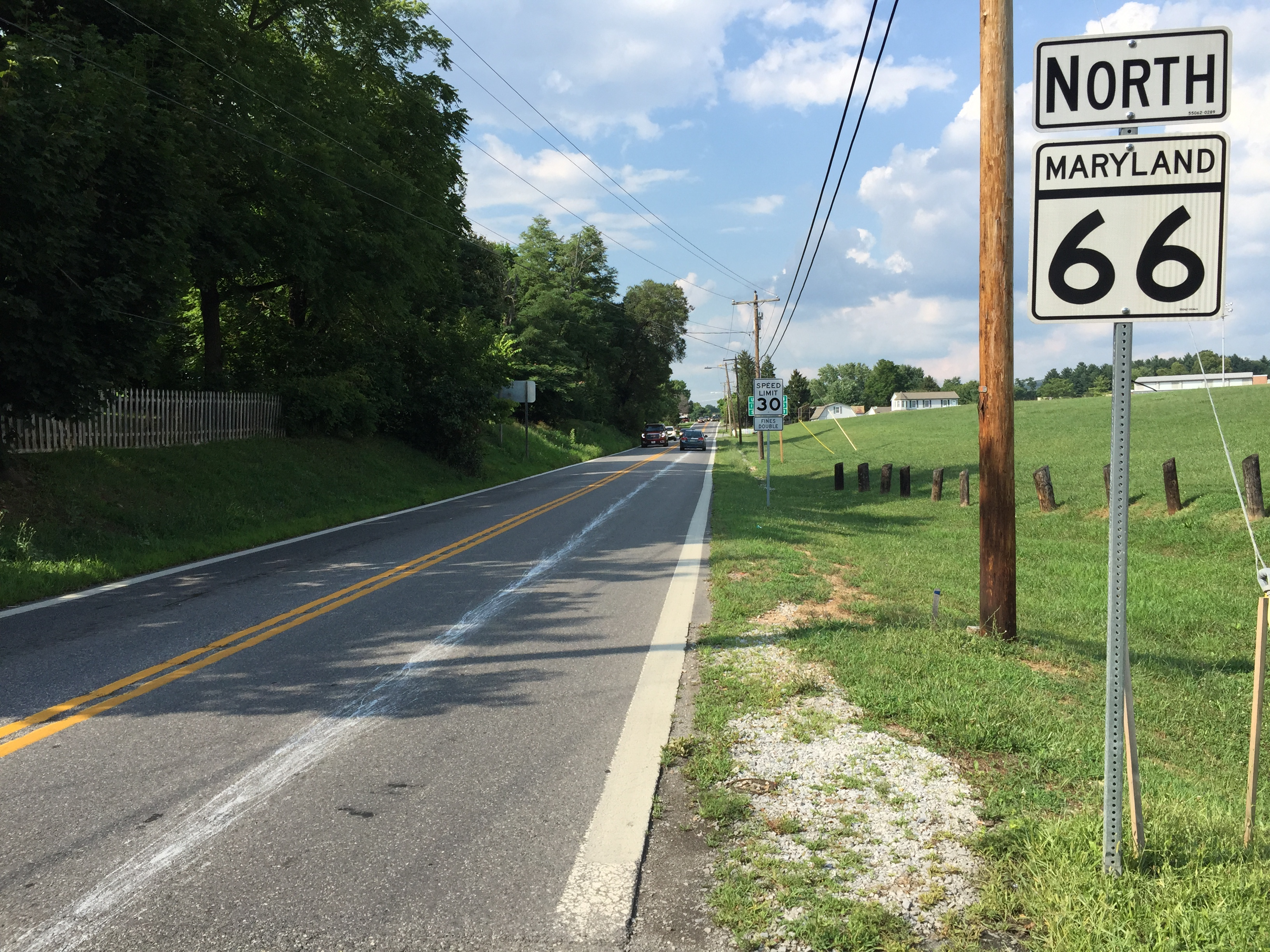
View north along MD 66 in Boonsboro

MD 66 begins at an intersection with US 40 Alternate (Main Street) near the Bowman House in Boonsboro. The state highway heads northeast as two-lane undivided Maple Avenue, passing west of Boonsboro High School before leaving the town. MD 66 continues north as Mapleville Road, passing through farmland and the villages of Mapleville and San Mar. The state highway continues north through the unincorporated town of Beaver Creek, where the highway intersects both US 40 (National Pike) and Beaver Creek Road at oblique angles at Wagner's Crossroads. MD 66 passes by Beaver Creek Country Club and crosses Blackrock Creek before the highway temporarily expands to a four-lane divided highway through its diamond interchange with I-70 (Eisenhower Memorial Highway). A park and ride lot is southeast of the road past this interchange.

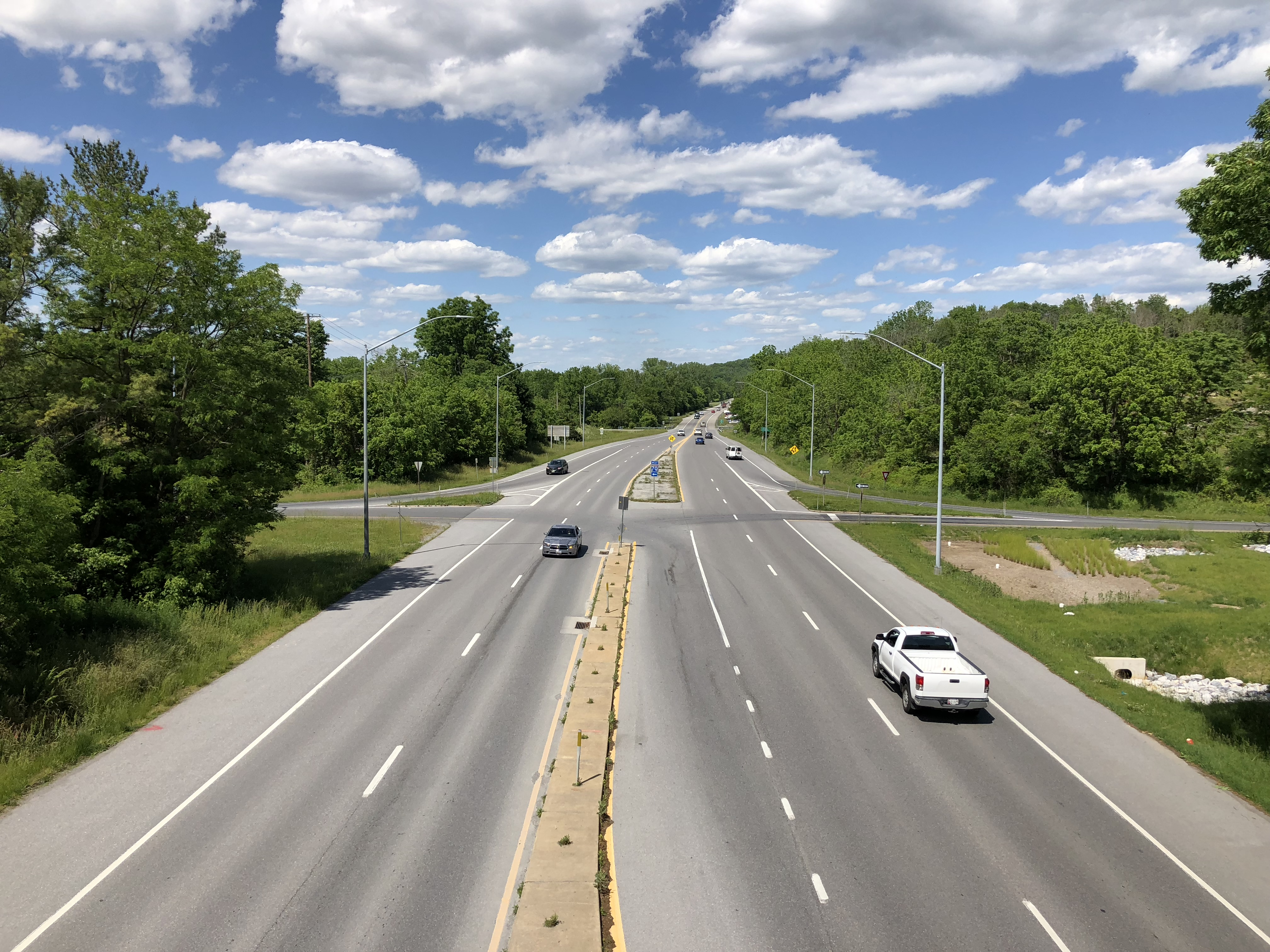
View north along MD 66 from I-70 in Beaver Creek

MD 66 continues northeast through a mix of farmland and forest, passing between a pair of quarries before reaching the roundabout at which the highway meets Mount Aetna Road in the community of Mount Aetna, which is home to the Highland View Academy. The state highway crosses Beaver Creek and passes to the west of Jugtown and between the historic homes The Maples and The Willows. After intersecting MD 64 (Smithsburg Pike), MD 66 passes through Cavetown, where the highway intersects Old Georgetown Road and Cavetown Church Road, which are the old alignments of MD 64 and MD 77, respectively. The state highway crosses Beaver Creek again and crosses CSX's Hanover Subdivision railroad line at-grade at a rakish angle before entering the town of Smithsburg, where MD 66 is municipally-maintained. MD 66 heads northeast through the town as Water Street. Shortly after intersecting Main Street, MD 66 turns north onto Pennsylvania Avenue. At the northern town limit, state maintenance resumes and the highway's name changes to Bradbury Avenue. MD 66 continues north through a mix of farms and residences to its northern terminus at MD 64 (Smithsburg Pike) north of Smithsburg.

== History ==
The first sections of modern MD 66 to be paved were constructed as part of MD 64. Bradbury Avenue north of Smithsburg was paved in 1916. The remainder of MD 64 was completed in 1923. The remainder of MD 66 was paved starting from Boonsboro in 1925. By 1927, the highway was paved north to Beaver Creek. In 1928, MD 66 was extended north to Mount Aetna. The state highway was completed to Chewsville Road in 1929. The final segment of MD 66 south of Cavetown was completed in 1933. Following the completion of MD 64's bypass of Cavetown and Smithsburg in 1958, MD 66 was extended north through Smithsburg over MD 64's old alignment. MD 66 was expanded to a four-lane divided highway at I-70 concurrent with the construction of the highway's interchange with I-70 in 1968. The roundabout at the intersection with Mount Aetna Road was constructed in 2002.

== Junction list ==
The entire route is in Washington County.

Location	mi	km	Destinations	Notes
Boonsboro	0.00	0.00	US 40 Alt. (Main Street) – Funkstown, Middletown	Southern terminus
Beaver Creek	4.25	6.84	US 40 (National Pike) – Hagerstown, Myersville	
Beaver Creek	5.33	8.58	I-70 (Eisenhower Memorial Highway) – Hagerstown, Frederick	I-70 Exit 35
Cavetown	10.32	16.61	MD 64 (Smithsburg Pike) – Chewsville, Hagerstown	
Smithsburg	12.84	20.66	MD 64 (Smithsburg Pike) – Ringgold, Waynesboro	Northern terminus
1.000 mi = 1.609 km; 1.000 km = 0.621 mi
