= Greenway Avenue Stadium =

Athletics stadium in Cumberland, Maryland

Coordinates: 39°38′33″N 78°44′54″W

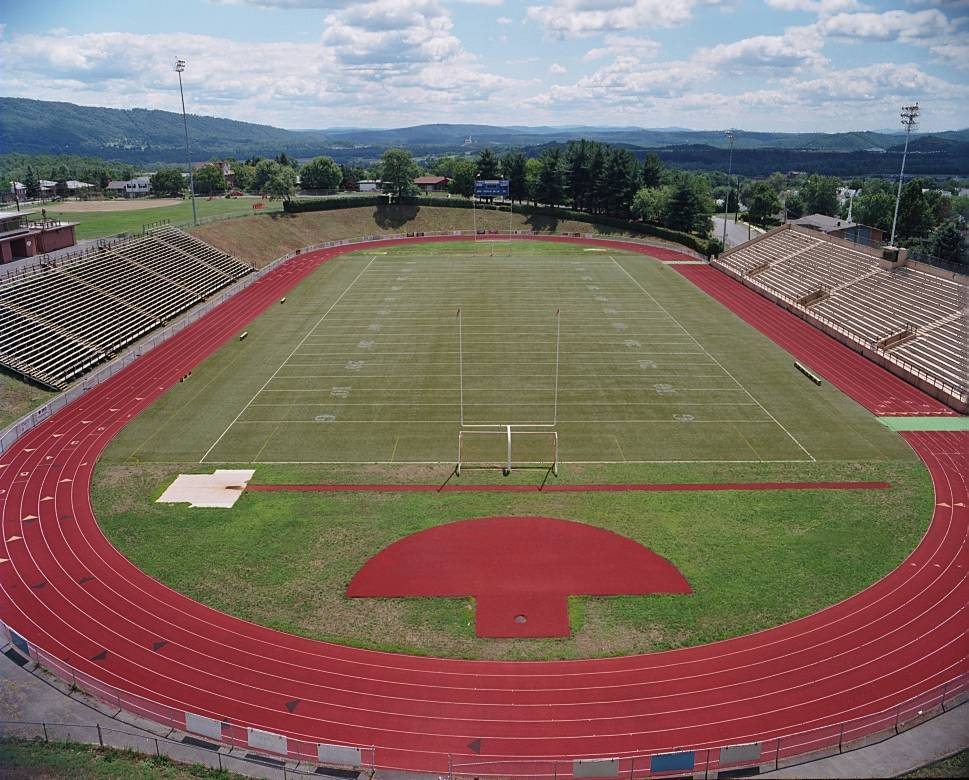
Greenway Avenue Stadium in Cumberland, Maryland, in May 2007

Greenway Avenue Stadium, located in Cumberland, Maryland serves as the primary athletics stadium for Allegany County, Maryland, United States.

== History ==
=== 20th century ===
Originally named Fort Hill Stadium it was constructed in the 1930s by the Public Works Administration as part of president Franklin D. Roosevelt's New Deal. The field first opened for play in the fall of 1937 and was called Fort Hill Stadium. The name was changed in 1987 to Greenway Avenue Stadium, named after the street where it resides. The facility is shared by both Allegany High School and Fort Hill High School. The stadium seats 6,054 with a total capacity of approximately 15,000.

Prior to 1998 the field was natural grass. In 1998, the field was upgraded to an all weather prescription turf with the anticipation of hosting scrimmages by the Washington Redskins who held summer training camp at Frostburg State University.

=== 21st century ===
The prescription turf was again replaced for the 2008 football season and again replaced for the 2019 season.

In February 2022, Allegany County Commissioners awarded $5 million to support the renovation of Greenway Avenue Stadium. Projects included in the package are replacement of the visitor's side bleachers and adding a new running track. The money will come from the fund balance for the project, with the county adding a pledge of $1.5 million from the American Rescue Plan Act.
