= Mapleville, Maryland =

Unincorporated community in Maryland, United States

- Unincorporated community
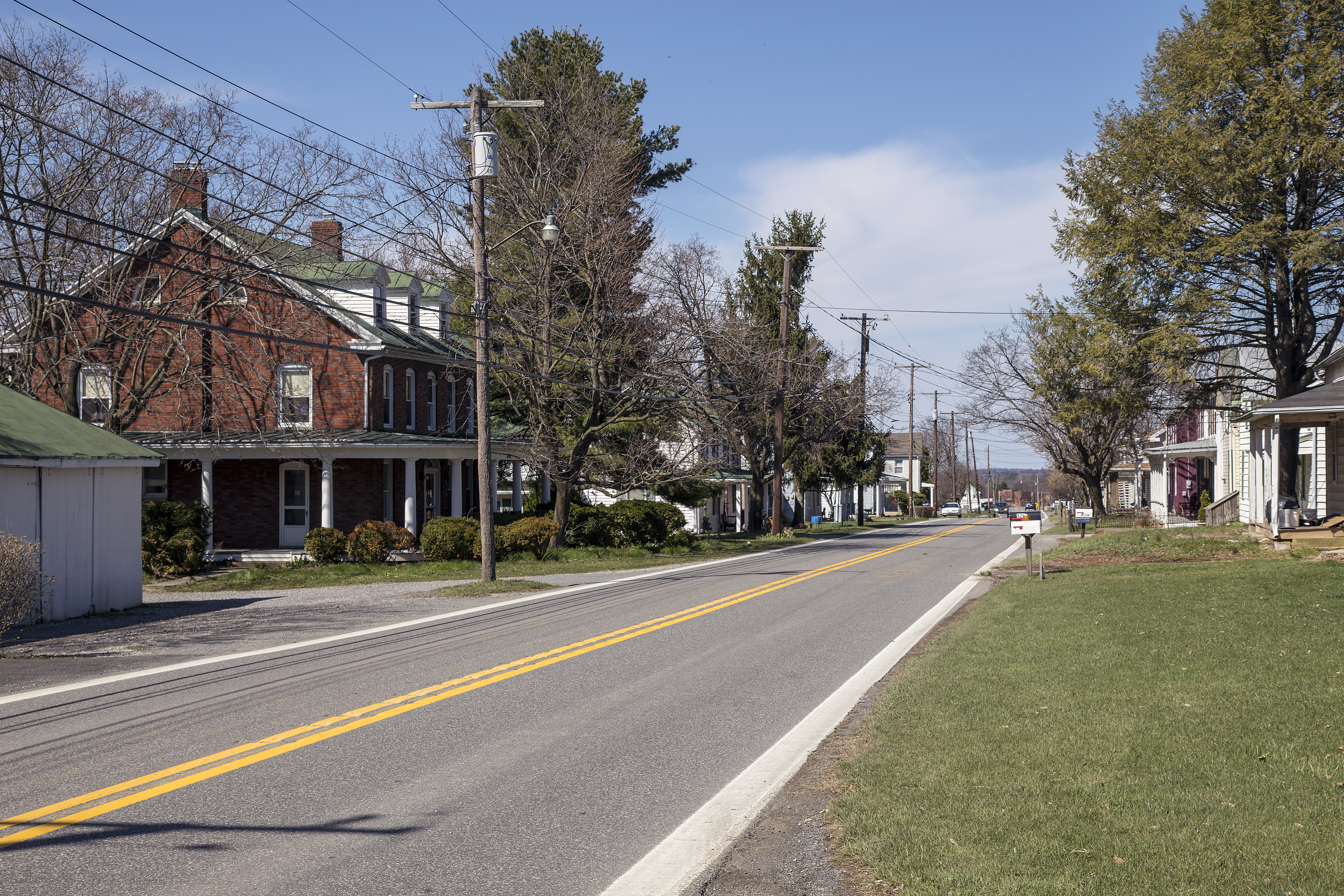
- Boonsboro Pike, Mapleville

- Location within Maryland Location within the United States
- Coordinates: 39°32′09″N 77°38′46″W
- Country: United States
- State: Maryland
- County: Washington

Area
  - Total: 0.40 sq mi (1.04 km^{2})
  - Land: 0.40 sq mi (1.04 km^{2})
  - Water: 0 sq mi (0.00 km^{2})
- Elevation: 650 ft (200 m)

Population (2020)
  - Total: 243
  - Density: 602.3/sq mi (232.55/km^{2})
- Time zone: UTC−5 (Eastern (EST))
  - Summer (DST): UTC−4 (EDT)
- ZIP code: 21713
- Area codes: 301, 240
- GNIS feature ID: 2583652

Mapleville is an unincorporated community and census-designated place in eastern Washington County, Maryland, United States. Its population was 243 as of the 2020 census. It is officially a part of the Hagerstown Metropolitan Area.

Mapleville lies along MD Route 66, known locally as the Mapleville Road, north of Boonsboro and just south of the community of San Mar. Route 66 links the towns of Boonsboro and Smithsburg, and provides local residents with access to nearby U.S. Route 40 and Interstate 70, making the main road along which the community is settled well-traveled. Short Hill, a lesser arm of the Blue Ridge's South Mountain, lies directly to the east of Mapleville; Greenbrier State Park & Lake are located between the hill and the range's principal ridge.

== Geography ==
According to the U.S. Census Bureau, the community has an area of 0.403 square miles (1.04 km^{2}), all land.

== Demographics ==
Historical population
Census	Pop.	Note	%±
2020	243		—
U.S. Decennial Census
