= Dahmar Wartts-Smiles =

American hurdler

Medal record

Men's athletics

Representing United States

Atlantic 10 Track and Field Championships
Gold medal – first place	2011 North Carolina	110 Hurdles
Gold medal – first place	2010 Massachusetts	110 Hurdles
Silver medal – second place	2010 Massachusetts	400 Hurdles
Silver medal – second place	2009 North Carolina	400 Hurdles

MPSSAA 3A Outdoor Track and Field Championships
Gold medal – first place	2008 Maryland	110 high hurdles
Silver medal – second place	2008 Maryland	4x200m Relay
Bronze medal – third place	2008 Maryland	300IH

Penn Relays Championship of America
Bronze medal – third place	2008 Philadelphia	4x400m Relay

National Scholastic Indoor Championships
Silver medal – second place	2008 New York	4x400m Relay

MPSSAA 3A Indoor Track and Field Championships
Silver medal – second place	2008 Maryland	500m
Silver medal – second place	2008 Maryland	4x400m Relay
Bronze medal – third place	2008 Maryland	4x800m Relay

Maryland 3A Central Regional Indoor Championships
Gold medal – first place	2008 Maryland	55mh
Gold medal – first place	2008 Maryland	500m
Gold medal – first place	2008 Maryland	4x800m Relay
Gold medal – first place	2008 Maryland	4x400m Relay

Anne Arundel County Indoor Championships
Gold medal – first place	2008 Maryland	55mh
Gold medal – first place	2008 Maryland	4x800m Relay
Gold medal – first place	2008 Maryland	4x400m Relay

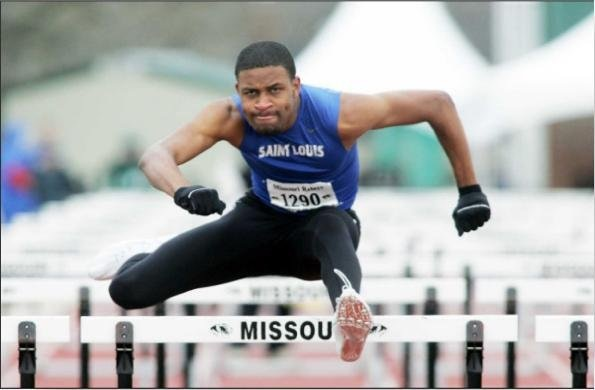
Smiles competing at the University of Missouri

Dahmar Maurice Smiles (born January 3, 1990, in St. Paul, Minnesota) is an American track and field athlete who specializes in the hurdles.

== High school ==
He received 3 medals in the 2008 MPSSAA 3A Outdoor Track and Field championships and was the 110 high hurdle champion running 14.24 tying the #10 All-Time record. He also earned 3 medals at the 2008 MPSSAA 3A Indoor Track and Field championships and helped lead the mustangs to 3 consecutive team state championship titles. He was also a member of the US# 3 2008 high school indoor 4 × 400 m relay team from Meade Senior High School in Fort Meade, MD that placed 2nd at the National Scholastic Indoor Championships making him an NSIC All-American. He was also a member of the same 4 × 400 m relay team that placed 3rd in the 2008 Championship of America at the Penn Relays.

== College ==
Smiles ran for Saint Louis University. In his freshmen year he was named Atlantic 10 Track and Field Rookie of the Week a total of 4 times.

At the 2009 Atlantic 10 Track and Field Championships held in Charlotte, N.C. at the Irwin Bell Track and Field Center on the Charlotte campus he finished second in the 400-meter hurdles with a school-record (SLU) time and PR of 53.12. He also finished fifth in the 110-meter hurdles with a time of 14.72. He advanced to the finals of the event after registering a school-record time (SLU) of 14.65 in the prelims. These performances qualified Smiles to run in the 2009 USA Junior Outdoor Championships making him the first Billiken to qualify in more than one event.

At the 2010 Atlantic 10 Conference Outdoor Track and Field Championships in Amherst, Mass, Smiles claimed the first conference title of his career in the 110-meter hurdles, posting a school-record time of 14.02, becoming the first male student-athlete to earn a conference title. He also finished second in the 400-meter hurdles at the A-10 meet, becoming the first Billiken to ever claim two All-Conference honors. Smiles along with teammate Brittany Cloudy helped the women's and men's squads to ninth-place showings, the Billikens' best finish since the program's inception.

In 2011, Smiles repeated as the Atlantic 10 Conference champion in the 110m hurdles at the Outdoor Track and Field Championships.

Smiles is a two-time Atlantic 10 Conference champion in the 110-meter hurdles, winning the title in 2010 and 2011. He also owns four runner-up finishes in A-10 Championships competition, placing second in the 110-meter hurdles in 2012, in the 400-meter hurdles in 2009 and 2010, and indoors in the 55-meter hurdles in 2011. Smiles qualified for NCAA Championships first-round competition three times; he moved on to the NCAA Championships quarterfinal round in 2010 and 2011, making him the only athlete in Billiken track and field history to advance twice. In 2009, he became the only Saint Louis track and field athlete ever to qualify in two events (110-meter hurdles, 400-meter hurdles) at the USATF U20 Outdoor Championships. Smiles holds SLU records in the 110-meter hurdles (14.02) and 60-meter hurdles (8.01).

== Honors ==
Smiles was inducted into the Saint Louis Billiken Hall of Fame in 2022.

=== References ===
- "Cloudy, Smiles Win Conference Titles". Sports. Saint Louis University. Archived from the original on July 28, 2011.
- "Billikens Break 12 School Records at A-10 Track and Field Championships". Sports. Saint Louis University. Archived from the original on July 16, 2011.
- "2008 HS Indoor Rankings". MileSplit.
- "Dahmar Smiles bio". MileSplit. Archived from the original on December 10, 2008.
- "New Balance Collegiate Invitational". Dyestat.
- Little, Carl (May 25, 2008). "A Final Run". Washington Post.
- "First Team All-Metro". Baltimore Sun. Archived from the original on October 11, 2008.
- "Meade Wins State Title". Baltimore Sun.
- "All-State Hurdlers". RunningMaryland. Archived from the original on June 7, 2008.
- "Justin Murdock and his Meade teammates blow out a 3:16.6 1600 Relay time in Orlando". RunningMaryland. Archived from the original on June 10, 2008.
