= Emily Bishop (disambiguation) =

Emily Bishop is a fictional character from the British ITV soap opera Coronation Street.

Emily Bishop may also refer to:

- Emily Clayton Bishop (1883–1912), American sculptor
- Emily M. Bishop (1858–1916), American Delsartean lecturer, instructor, author
