= Smithsburg High School =

High school in Smithsburg, Maryland

Location
- Smithsburg, Maryland; United States; 39°39′35″N 77°34′31″W

Information
- Type: Public secondary
- Established: 1965
- Principal: Rachel Kane-Kirkpatrick
- Grades: 9–12
- Enrollment: 790
- Colors: Purple and Gold
- Mascot: Leopard
- Rival: Boonsboro High School
- Website: shs.wcpsmd.com

Smithsburg High School was constructed in 1965 on 66 North Main Street in the town of Smithsburg, Maryland, United States. The school is part of the Washington County Public Schools system. It shares a campus with Smithsburg Middle School and, across the street, Smithsburg Elementary School.

== Academic recognition ==
Smithsburg High School was named in U.S. News & World Report's annual listing of the Best High Schools in the United States, earning a Silver Award for test scores consistently above state and national averages. The school was also awarded the title of Blue Ribbon School in 2015 for its overall academic success.

== Notable alumni ==
- Emily Clayton Bishop — sculptor whose work can be seen on display at the Smithsonian American Art Museum
- Jim Schlossnagle — head baseball coach, University of Texas
- Arizona Zervas — rapper, known for his song “Roxanne”
- Kathy J. Warden — CEO of Northrop Grumman
- William J. Wivell — Maryland State Delegate
- Dustin Davidson - musician, bassist for Grammy nominated metal band August Burns Red
