= The Maples (Smithsburg, Maryland) =

Historic house in Maryland, United States

- U.S. National Register of Historic Places
- Location within Maryland Location within the United States
- Location: miles (3.2 km) southwest of Smithsburg on Maryland Route 66, Smithsburg, Maryland
- Coordinates: 39°37′26.7″N 77°36′31.3″W
- Area: 126.1 acres (51.0 ha)
- Built: 1790
- NRHP reference No.: 75000927
- Added to NRHP: February 24, 1975

The Maples is a historic home located at Smithsburg, Washington County, Maryland, United States. It is a two-story, six-bay stone and log dwelling trimmed in black and white. The house features a rather elaborate neoclassical cornice with dentils matching the entrance frontispiece and extending along the entire length of the house. The stone section postdates the log structure and was erected between 1790 and 1810.

It was listed on the National Register of Historic Places in 1975.
