= Erika Thimey =

German dancer and dance educator (1910–2006)

- Erika Thimey, from a 1941 American newspaper.
- Born: 1910; Itzehoe
- Died: September 20, 2006 (aged 95–96); Hagerstown, Maryland
- Occupations: Dancer, dance educator
- Years active: 1930s–1990s
- Known for: Modern dance, liturgical dance

Erika Thimey (1910 – September 20, 2006) was a German dancer and dance educator, based for most of her career in Washington, D.C.

== Early life ==
Thimey was born in Itzehoe, Germany in 1901. She trained as a dancer in Berlin, and in Dresden with Mary Wigman and Hanya Holm.

== Career ==
Thimey performed one season with an opera in Dessau, before she moved to the United States in 1932. In 1936, she danced the lead role of Undine in a large summer spectacle involving over 100 dancers and a live orchestra, celebrating the fountains in Chicago parks. She was dance director at the North Shore Conservatory in Chicago, before she moved to Boston in 1938, to teach and dance with Austrian dancer Jan Veen. She performed with the Boston Pops Orchestra, and toured the United States with Veen.

Beginning during her Chicago years, Thimey was known for her works in liturgical dance, and was an active member of the Sacred Dance Guild of America. "She regards sacred dancing simply as a modernization of the age-old pageantry of the church," explained a Chicago newspaper in 1941.

Thimey was a dance teacher and choreographer in the Washington, D.C. area for most of her career. She was dance instructor at King-Smith Studio School. She opened her own school, Dance Theatre Studios, in 1944, with classes for adults and children. Her students performed as the Washington Dance Theatre. She also taught modern dance at Howard University, and at various schools, camps, and community organizations. Among her notable students were Paul Sanasardo and Susan Rethorst.

She was a co-founder of the Modern Dance Council of Washington in 1953. She retired from teaching in 1979. There was a retrospective concert of her works in 1980, at an art gallery on Capitol Hill.

== Personal life and legacy ==
Thimey retired to Smithsburg, Maryland in 1979, and lived in a converted church with her sister, Hertha Woltersdorf. The sisters offered their unusual home for performance and exhibit space, and Thimey worked with local churches on liturgical works until 2001. She died at a nursing home in Hagerstown, Maryland, in 2006, aged 96 years.

Thimey's papers, including films, videotapes, and sound recordings, are in the Historical Society of Washington, D.C. There is a 1980 interview with Thimey on video in the Jerome Robbins Dance Division of the New York Public Library. There is also a 1985 interview with Thimey (audio only) in the United States Holocaust Memorial Museum. and some correspondence in the Pola Nirenska collection at the Library of Congress.

The Erika Thimey Dance and Theatre Company, co-founded by James E. Mayo, continues to perform in the Washington area. There is an Erika Thimey Scholarship in Dance at the University of Maryland.
