= Kathy Warden =

American business executive

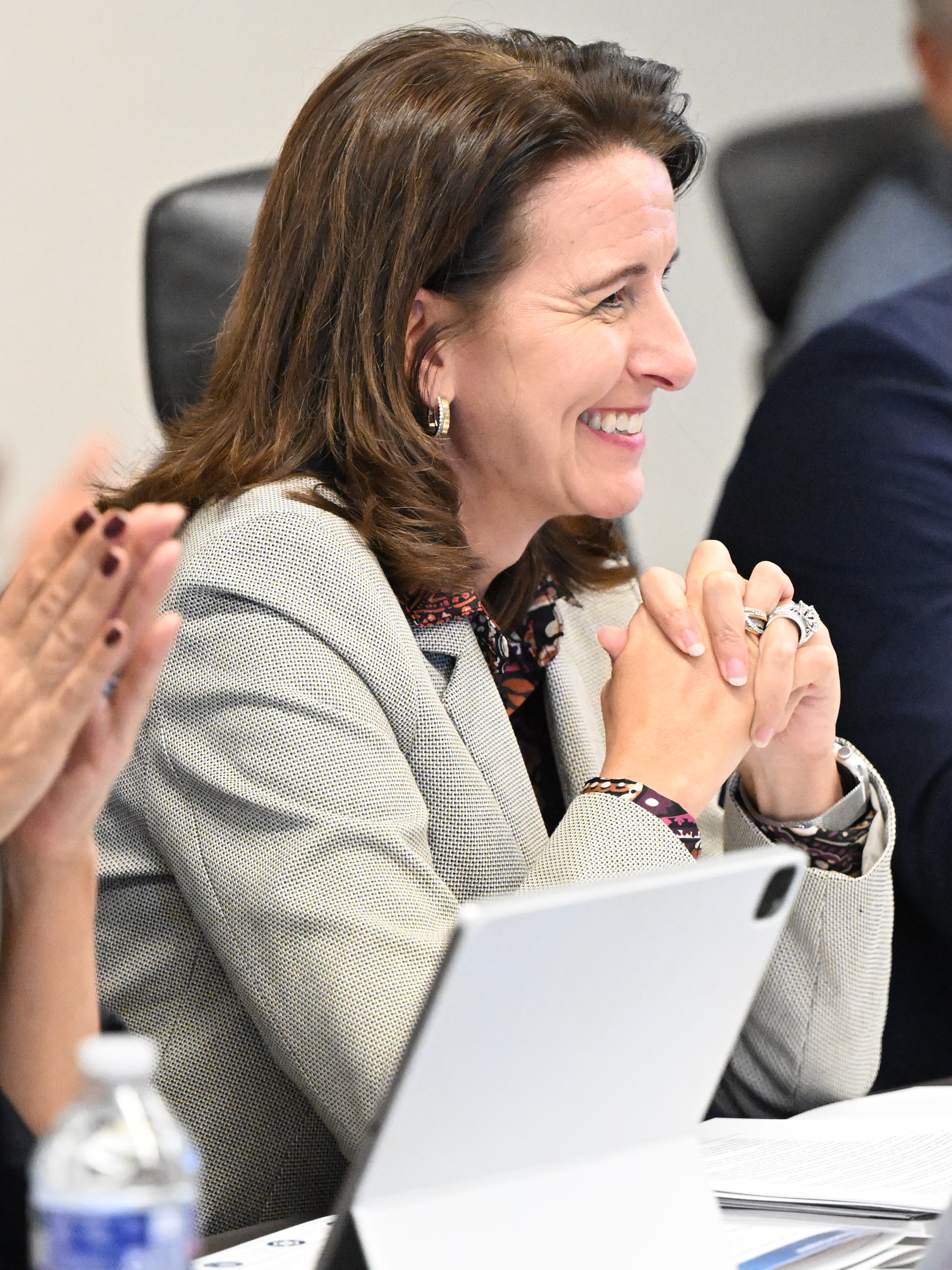
- Warden in 2024
- Born: 1970 or 1971 (age 55–56)
- Education: James Madison University (BA); George Washington University (MBA)
- Title: Chair, President and CEO of Northrop Grumman

Kathy J. Warden (born 1970/71) is an American business executive who has been chief executive officer (CEO) and president of Northrop Grumman since 2019.

== Early life ==
Warden grew up in Smithsburg, Maryland, and graduated from Smithsburg High School. She then earned a bachelor's degree at James Madison University in 1992, and an MBA at George Washington University in 1999.

== Career ==
Warden started her career with General Electric, working there for nearly a decade. She later held executive roles at Veridian Corporation and General Dynamics. Warden was also a principal in a venture capital firm, where she helped companies improve their business models and electronic publishing services. Warden is a cybersecurity and information technology expert.

Warden joined Northrop Grumman in 2008 as vice president and general manager of the company's cybersecurity business. In 2015, while president of Northrop Grumman Information Systems, she was included in Federal Computer Week's "Federal 100" list; the magazine credited her for increasing Northrop Grumman's participation in the CyberPatriot program and creation of the Advanced Cyber Technology Center, and for overseeing $1.5 billion in contracts for the 2014 fiscal year. Warden began her tenure as president of the Mission Systems sector in January 2016, when the company merged its Information Systems and Electronics Systems sectors. She became president and COO of Northrop Grumman in January 2018, and her tenure as CEO started on January 1, 2019.

Warden has been credited with leading the integration of Orbital ATK, later Northrop Grumman Innovation Systems. She joined Northrop Grumman's board of directors in July 2018 and became Chair in August 2019.

=== Board membership and advisory roles ===
Warden is a member of The Business Council. In 2016, she had a position on the board of the Wolf Trap National Park for the Performing Arts. She was also on the Federal Reserve Bank of Richmond board from 2018 to 2020. She also worked with the Aspen Institute's computer security strategy group.

Warden was on the Clinton administration's Internet Advisory Council. She joined James Madison University's board of visitors in October 2018. Previously, Warden was on the board of the university's College of Business, starting in 2016.

Warden was sanctioned by Russia in April 2022 along with 28 other American nationals. In May 2024, she was sanctioned by China due to arms sales to Taiwan.

Warden accepted the 2022 Collier Trophy on the company's behalf for the launch of the James Webb Space Telescope.

Warden joined the board of Merck & Co. in 2020. In 2019, she joined the board of the nonprofit Catalyst, becoming its chair in 2024. She is also on the board of the Greater Washington Partnership and became its chair in January 2024. She is on the executive committee for the Aerospace Industries Association and previously was its board chair.

Warden was appointed to the National Space Council's users' advisory group in May 2020. She was selected for another term in December 2022. In April 2024, the U.S. Department of Homeland Security named her to its new Artificial Intelligence Safety and Security Board.

== Recognition ==
Year	Organization	Award	Result	Ref.
2017	Washingtonian	Most powerful women in Washington, D.C.	Listed	
2018	James Madison University's Beta Gamma Sigma chapter	Business Achievement Award	Won	
2018	Fortune	Most Powerful Women	#22	
2019	Fortune	Most Powerful Women	#13	
2020	Fortune	Most Powerful Women	#20	
2021	Fortune	Most Powerful Women	#23	
2022	Columbia Business School	Deming Cup for Operational Excellence	Won	
2022	Forbes	World's 100 Most Powerful Women	#38	
2022	Fortune	Most Powerful Women	#22	
2023	Forbes	World's 100 Most Powerful Women	#38	
2023	Fortune	Most Powerful Women	#20	
2023	Washingtonian	Most powerful women in Washington, D.C.	Listed	
2024	Forbes	World's 100 Most Powerful Women	#36	
2024	Fortune	Most Powerful Women	#25	
2025	Fortune	Most Powerful Women	#68	
