= Queen Anne's County Public Schools =

Maryland school district

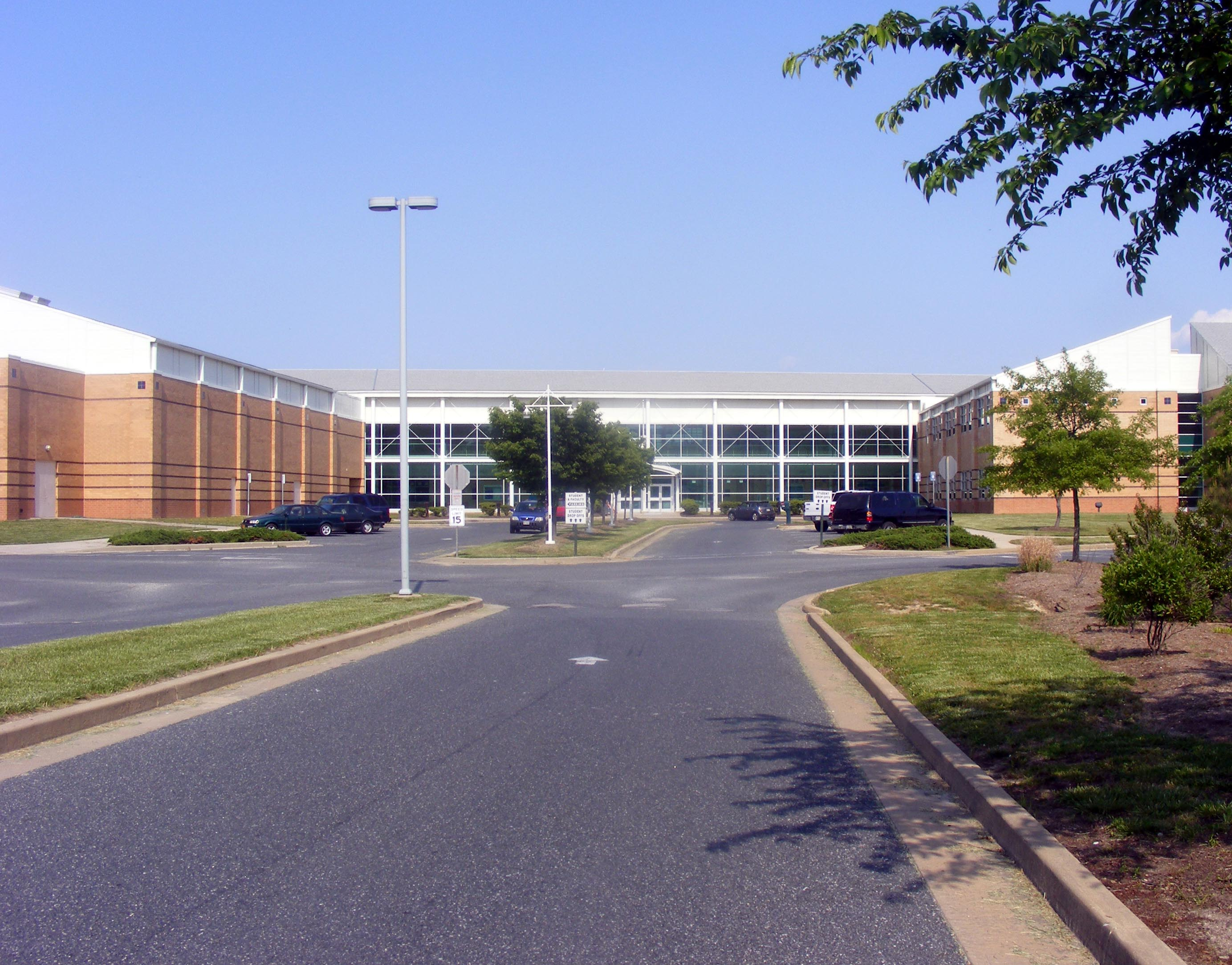
Kent Island High School

Queen Anne's County Public Schools is a school district on the Eastern Shore of Maryland. All schools are accredited by the Middle States Association of Colleges and Schools.

== High schools ==
- Kent Island, Stevensville
- Queen Anne's County, Centreville

== Middle schools ==
- Centreville, Centreville
- Matapeake, Stevensville
- Stevensville, Stevensville
- Sudlersville, Sudlersville

== Elementary schools ==
- Bayside, Stevensville
- Centreville, Centreville
- Church Hill, Church Hill
- Grasonville, Grasonville
- Kennard, Centreville
- Kent Island, Stevensville
- Matapeake, Stevensville
- Sudlersville, Sudlersville
