= Fort Hill High School =

Public high school in Maryland, USA

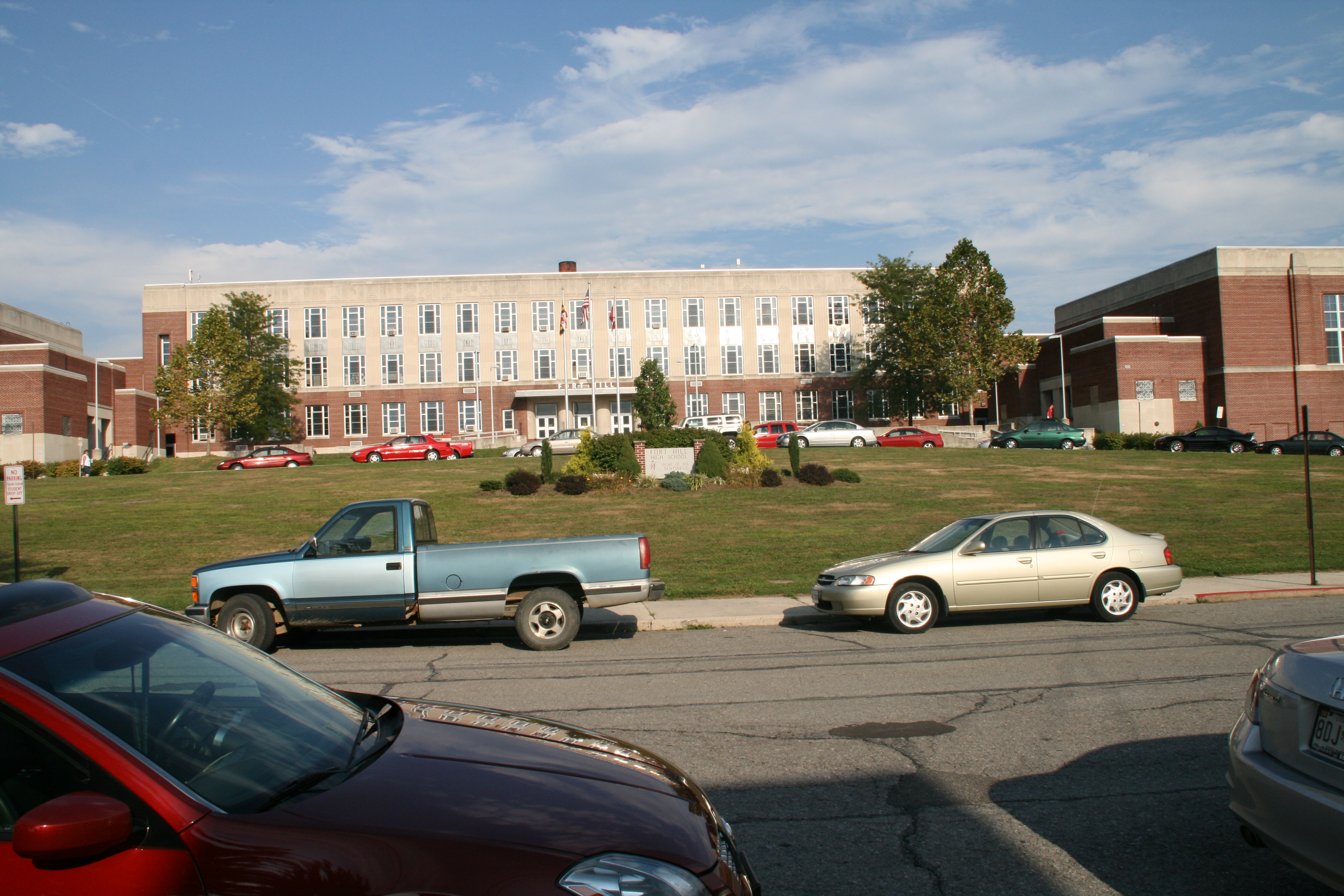

Location
- 500 Greeway Avenue; Cumberland, Maryland 21502; United States; 39°38′39″N 78°44′55″W

Information
- School type: Public high school
- Motto: Deeds, not words
- Established: 1936
- School board: Allegany County Board of Education
- School district: Allegany County Public Schools
- Oversight: Maryland State Department of Education
- Superintendent: Jeffrey S. Blank
- Principal: Candy Canan
- Grades: 9-12
- Enrollment: 780 (2016)
- Campus: Suburban
- Colors: Red and white
- Athletics conference: AMAC
- Mascot: Sentinels
- Feeder schools: Washington Middle School
- Website: www.forthillhs.com

Fort Hill High School is a four-year public high school in Cumberland, Maryland, United States, serving 780 students in grades 9 through 12. Fort Hill is part of Allegany County Public Schools.

== History ==
Fort Hill High School was one of three local New Deal projects. Fort Hill High school was a Public Works Administration project. Nearby Constitution Park and Greeway Avenue Stadium were Works Progress Administration projects

New Deal funding relating to Fort Hill was initiated in November 1934 and September 1935, when the PWA committed federal funds not to exceed $230,000. The project was labeled PWA Docket #7323.

When Fort Hill opened, it had 1763 students and 88 teachers. Heisey was the first principal.

== Athletics ==
=== State championships ===
Boys Cross Country:

- Class 2A 1995, 1997

Football:

- Class 3A 1975 (undefeated)
- Class 2A 1997 (undefeated)
- Class 1A 2013 (undefeated), 2014 (undefeated), 2015, 2016 (undefeated), 2018 (undefeated), 2021 (undefeated), 2022, 2023 (undefeated), 2024

Volleyball:

- Class 1A 2013

=== Football ===
The school has fielded a team since 1936, playing 925 total games (726 wins, 182 losses, 17 ties), producing an all-time winning percentage of 79% as of 2021.

- Fort Hill has won 11 state football championships since the inception of the Maryland Public Secondary Schools Athletic Association state playoffs in 1974. By decade:
  - 1975 (3A)
  - 1997 (2A)
  - 2013 (1A), 2014 (1A), 2015 (1A), 2016 (1A), 2018 (1A)
  - 2021 (1A), 2022 (1A), 2023 (1A), 2024 (1A).
- Fort Hill has a Maryland state record of most undefeated regular seasons at 21:
  - 40s-60s: 1948, 1950, 1957, 1958, 1963,
  - 70s-90s: 1973, 1975, 1977, 1990, 1994, 1995, 1997
  - 2000-2020: 2000, 2009, 2011, 2013, 2014, 2016, 2018
  - Since 2021: 2021, 2023.
- Fort Hill has a Maryland state record of most undefeated seasons overall at 14:
  - 40s-60s: 1948, 1950, 1957, 1958, 1963
  - 70s-90s: 1973, 1975, 1997
  - 2000s: 2013, 2014, 2016, 2018, 2021, 2023.

=== Facilities ===
The school gymnasium is used for league basketball.

Greenway Avenue Stadium, located at the school, was constructed in the 1930s by the Public Works Administration as part of President Roosevelt's New Deal and was built for the high school as Fort Hill Stadium. The stadium, since renamed as Greenway Avenue stadium and shared with Allegany High School, is considered to be an historic landmark. A $7 million renovation project to update and expand the 70-year-old facility has been completed.

== Notable alumni ==
- Rebeca Arthur, actress
- James Deetz, archeologist
- Ty Johnson (American football), running back
- Mark Manges, quarterback
- Steve Trimble, NFL free safety (Denver Broncos 1981–1983, Chicago Bears 1987)
