= Mount Aetna, Maryland =

- CDP
- Location of Mount Aetna, Maryland
- Coordinates: 39°36′02″N 77°37′12″W
- Country: United States
- State: Maryland
- County: Washington

Area
  - Total: 1.41 sq mi (3.66 km^{2})
  - Land: 1.41 sq mi (3.66 km^{2})
  - Water: 0 sq mi (0.00 km^{2})
- Elevation: 591 ft (180 m)

Population (2020)
  - Total: 580
  - Density: 410.5/sq mi (158.51/km^{2})
- Time zone: UTC−5 (Eastern (EST))
  - Summer (DST): UTC−4 (EDT)
- FIPS code: 24-53750
- GNIS feature ID: 2389509

Mount Aetna is a census-designated place (CDP) in Washington County, Maryland, United States. The population was 838 at the 2000 census.

== Geography ==
According to the United States Census Bureau, the CDP has a total area of 3.9 square miles (10 km^{2}), all land.

The community is situated at the western base of South Mountain at elevations between 500 and 700 feet; the landscape here is principally underlain by the Tomstown Dolomite, and the neighboring area is home to at least four known solutional caves, one of which—Mount Aetna Cave—was open briefly for commercial tours in the 1930s. This region is drained by Mount Aetna Creek, which has at least three headwaters in the neighboring mountain, and is a tributary of Beaver Creek.

== Demographics ==
Historical population
Census	Pop.	Note	%±
1990	3,608		—
2000	838		−76.8%
2020	580		—

As of the census of 2000, there were 838 people, 286 households, and 233 families residing in the CDP. The population density was 215.5 inhabitants per square mile (83.2/km^{2}). There were 292 housing units at an average density of 75.1 per square mile (29.0/km^{2}). The racial makeup of the CDP was 95.94% White, 1.07% African American, 0.36% Native American, 1.55% Asian, 0.84% from other races, and 0.24% from two or more races. Hispanic or Latino of any race were 2.39% of the population.

There were 286 households, out of which 35.3% had children under the age of 18 living with them, 73.4% were married couples living together, 4.5% had a female householder with no husband present, and 18.5% were non-families. 12.2% of all households were made up of individuals, and 4.5% had someone living alone who was 65 years of age or older. The average household size was 2.88 and the average family size was 3.13.

In the CDP, the population was spread out, with 27.7% under the age of 18, 6.4% from 18 to 24, 30.0% from 25 to 44, 27.7% from 45 to 64, and 8.2% who were 65 years of age or older. The median age was 38 years. For every 100 females, there were 102.4 males. For every 100 females age 18 and over, there were 95.5 males.

The median income for a household in the CDP was $48,523, and the median income for a family was $52,344. Males had a median income of $40,750 versus $31,250 for females. The per capita income for the CDP was $21,435. About 3.0% of families and 4.0% of the population were below the poverty line, including none of those under the age of eighteen or sixty-five or over.

== Community ==
The area is traditionally defined as lying along the road of the same name, between MD Route 66 and Crystal Falls Road. Mount Aetna is home to a Seventh-day Adventist community; a Seventh-day Adventist private elementary/middle school, Mt. Aetna Adventist School; as well as the Seventh-day Adventist private high school, Highland View Academy, founded in 1949. There is also a volunteer fire company, as well as the SDA-run Mt. Aetna Retreat Center.
