= Mark Manges =

American football player (1956–2023)

No. 18
- Position: Quarterback

Personal information
- Born: January 10, 1956; Cumberland, Maryland, U.S.
- Died: September 22, 2023 (aged 67); Cumberland, Maryland, U.S.
- Listed height: 6 ft 2 in (1.88 m)
- Listed weight: 210 lb (95 kg)

Career information
- High school: Fort Hill (Cumberland)
- College: Maryland
- NFL draft: 1978: 4th round, 105th overall pick

Career history
- Los Angeles Rams (1978)*; St. Louis Cardinals (1978); Hamilton Tiger-Cats (1979); Philadelphia Eagles (1980)*
- * Offseason or practice squad member only

Awards and highlights
- First-team All-ACC (1976); Second-team All-American (1976)
- Stats at Pro Football Reference

Mark Roy Manges (/ˈmæŋəs/ MANG-əs; January 10, 1956 – September 22, 2023) was an American professional football player who was a quarterback in the National Football League (NFL) and Canadian Football League (CFL). He played college football for the Maryland Terrapins. Manges played in the NFL for the St. Louis Cardinals and in the CFL for the Hamilton Tiger-Cats.

== College career ==
After playing high school football at Fort Hill High School, Manges played college football for the Maryland Terrapins (1974–1977), appearing on the cover of Sports Illustrated's October 1976 issue. He was also named to the All-ACC first-team.

At the beginning of his senior year (1977), he was a Heisman Trophy contender. Manges broke his hand in the third game of the season.

== Professional career ==
Manges was selected in the fourth round of the 1978 NFL draft by the Los Angeles Rams with the 105th overall pick. He played in one game in the NFL with the St. Louis Cardinals. Manges also played one game with the Hamilton Tiger-Cats of the CFL in 1979.

== Personal life and death ==
Manges was a member of the Allegany County of Maryland Greenway Avenue Stadium Capital Improvement Fund (where he ran the meetings), and was an executive board member of the Dapper Dan. He also served as a member of the board of directors for the Fort Hill High School Scholarship Fund.

Every Friday night during Fort Hill football games Mark Manges could be heard serving as a commentator on radio broadcasts of Fort Hill football games for WTBO.

He died at his home on September 22, 2023, at the age of 67.
