= Beatrice Fenton =

American sculptor (1887–1983)

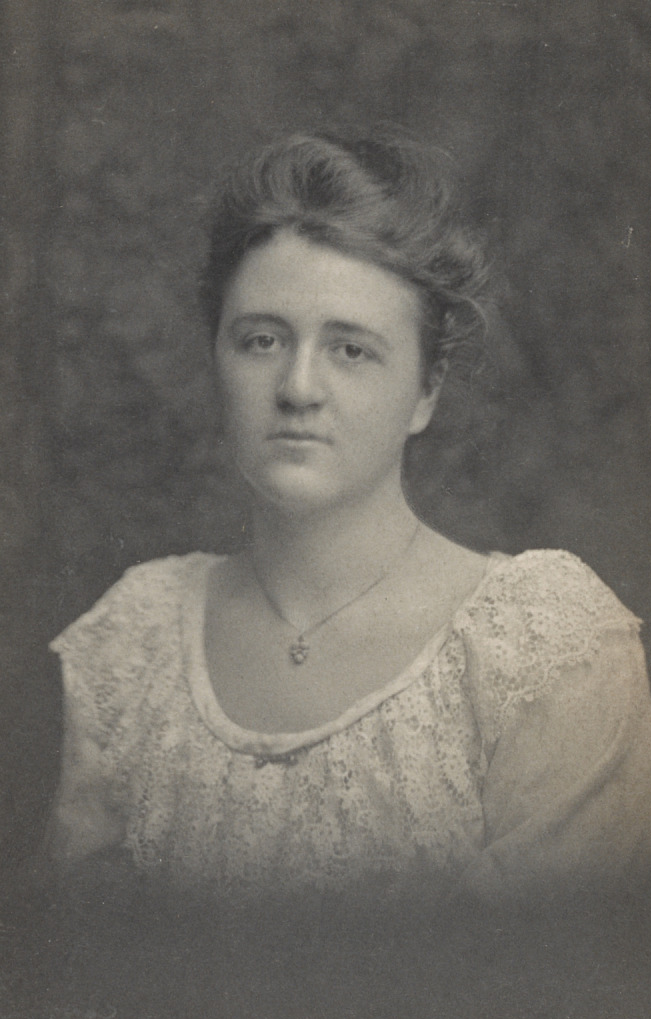
- Beatrice Fenton, c.1910
- Born: July 12, 1887; Philadelphia, Pennsylvania, U.S.
- Died: February 11, 1983 (aged 95); Philadelphia, Pennsylvania, U.S.
- Resting place: West Laurel Hill Cemetery, Bala Cynwyd, Pennsylvania, U.S.
- Education: Pennsylvania Museum and School of Industrial Art; Pennsylvania Academy of the Fine Arts
- Employer: Moore Institute of Art
- Partner: Marjorie D. Martinet

Beatrice Fenton (July 12, 1887 – February 11, 1983) was an American sculptor and a member of the Philadelphia Ten and the Plastic Club. She won the George D. Widener Memorial gold medal in 1922, and awards for her work at the Pan-Pacific Exposition of San Francisco in 1919, the Sesquicentennial Exposition in 1926, and the Art Club of Philadelphia in 1929.

She exhibited at major venues including the National Sculpture Society in 1929, the art competitions at the 1932 Summer Olympics, the National Association of Women Painters and Sculptors in 1936, the 1939 New York World's Fair, the Art Institute of Chicago, the National Academy of Design, and the Philadelphia Museum of Art in 1976. She taught sculpture at Moore College of Art and Design in Philadelphia from 1942 to 1953.

== Early life and education ==
Fenton was born on July 12, 1887, in Philadelphia, Pennsylvania, to Thomas Hanover and Lizzie Spear (née Remak) Fenton. Inspired by the painter Rosa Bonheur, she wanted to become an animalier and began drawing animals at the Philadelphia Zoo. Her father, an art patron and head of the Art Club of Philadelphia, was impressed with the drawings and showed them to a family friend, Thomas Eakins. Eakins found the drawings “too flat” and suggested that she “get some clay and mold it.” Fenton enrolled in a sculpture class taught by Alexander Stirling Calder in 1903, and her future direction was set. From 1904 to 1912 she attended the Pennsylvania Museum and School of Industrial Art and the Pennsylvania Academy of the Fine Arts where she studied with Charles Grafly.

== Career ==
Works by Fenton were shown at the annual exhibition of the Pennsylvania Academy of the Fine Arts most years from 1911 to 1964. She won the George D. Widener Memorial Gold Medal in 1922 for Seaweed Fountain. She received awards for her work at the Pan-Pacific Exposition of San Francisco in 1919, the Sesquicentennial Exposition in 1926, and the Art Club of Philadelphia in 1929. She exhibited at the art competitions at the 1932 Summer Olympics, the National Association of Women Painters and Sculptors in 1936, the 1939 New York World's Fair, the Art Institute of Chicago, the National Academy of Design, and the Philadelphia Museum of Art in 1976.

She was a member of the Philadelphia Ten and The Plastic Club groups of women painters and sculptors. Several of her pieces can be viewed in public places in Philadelphia including the Evelyn Taylor Price Memorial Sundial in Rittenhouse Square and Pan with Sundial on the campus of the University of Pennsylvania.

She was a member of the National Sculpture Society, and her Nereid Fountain was featured in the exhibition of 1929. A cast of Seaweed Fountain has been in the Brookgreen Gardens collection since 1934.

Fenton succeeded Samuel Murray as instructor in sculpture at the Moore College of Art and Design in Philadelphia, and taught there from 1942 to 1953.

She created four statues at the entrance gate to Children's Hospital of Philadelphia modeled from boys and girls chosen during a picnic. One of the statues of the girls became known as "Mary CHOP" and is still used in the institution's logo.

In 1974, two of her 500 pound bronze fish sculptures were stolen from their mounts beside the Seaweed Girl fountain displayed in the Lemon Hill pond in Philadelphia. The fish were never recovered and were believed to have been melted down for the value of the metal. Out of concern that the Seaweed Girl sculpture would be targeted next, it was moved inside the greenhouse of the Fairmount Park Horticultural Center.

She died in Philadelphia in 1983 and was interred at West Laurel Hill Cemetery in Bala Cynwyd, Pennsylvania.

== Personal life ==
She was lifelong friends with sculptor Emily Clayton Bishop and art educator Marjorie Martinet. Fenton had a romantic relationship with Martinet that lasted more than fifty years.

== Gallery ==
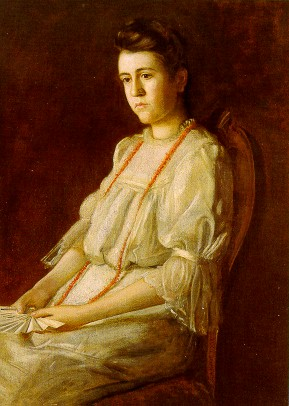
The Coral Necklace: Portrait of Beatrice Fenton (1904), by Thomas Eakins, Butler Institute of American Art, Youngstown, Ohio.

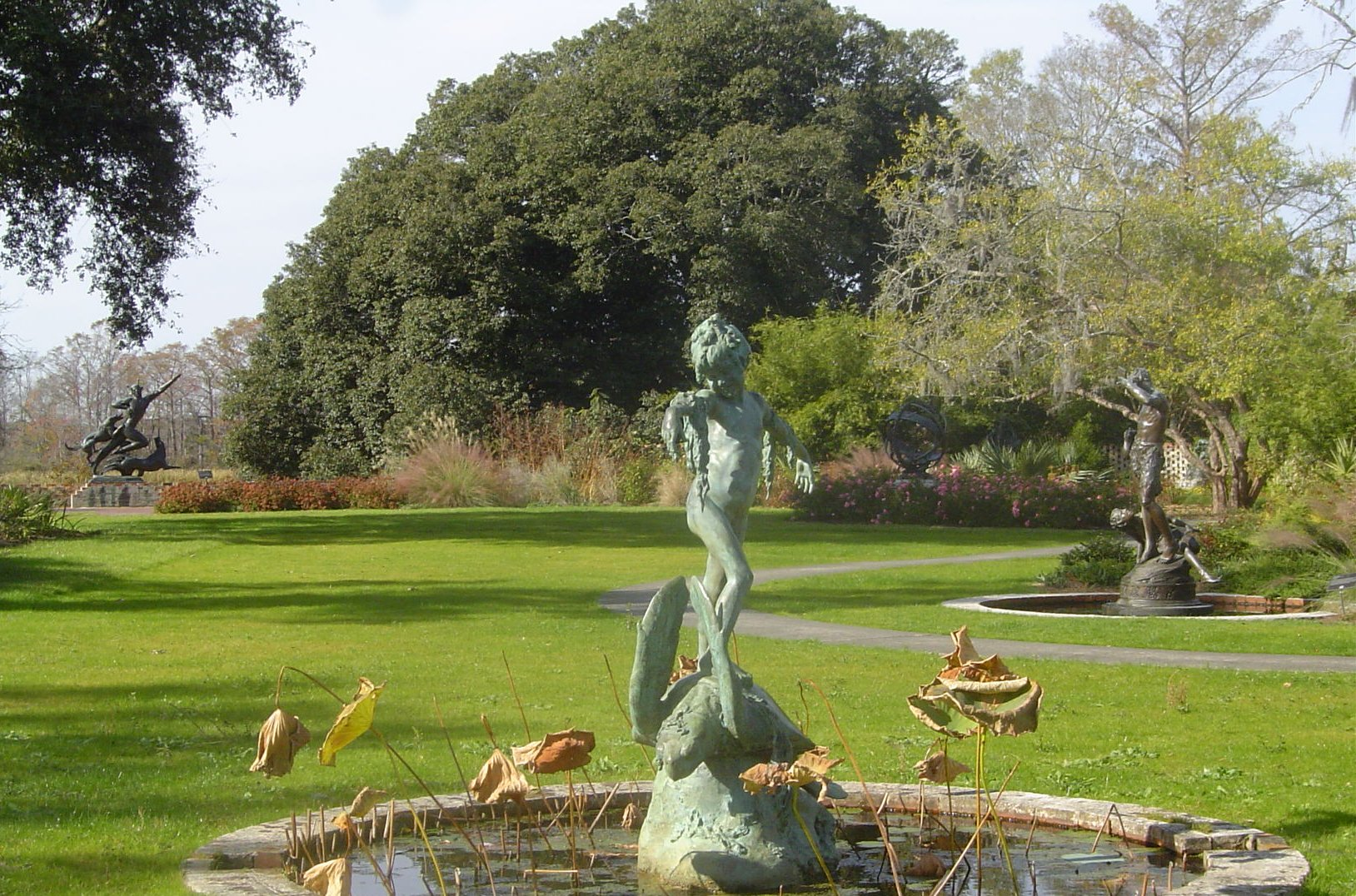
Seaweed Fountain (1920–22), Brookgreen Gardens, Murrell's Inlet, South Carolina.

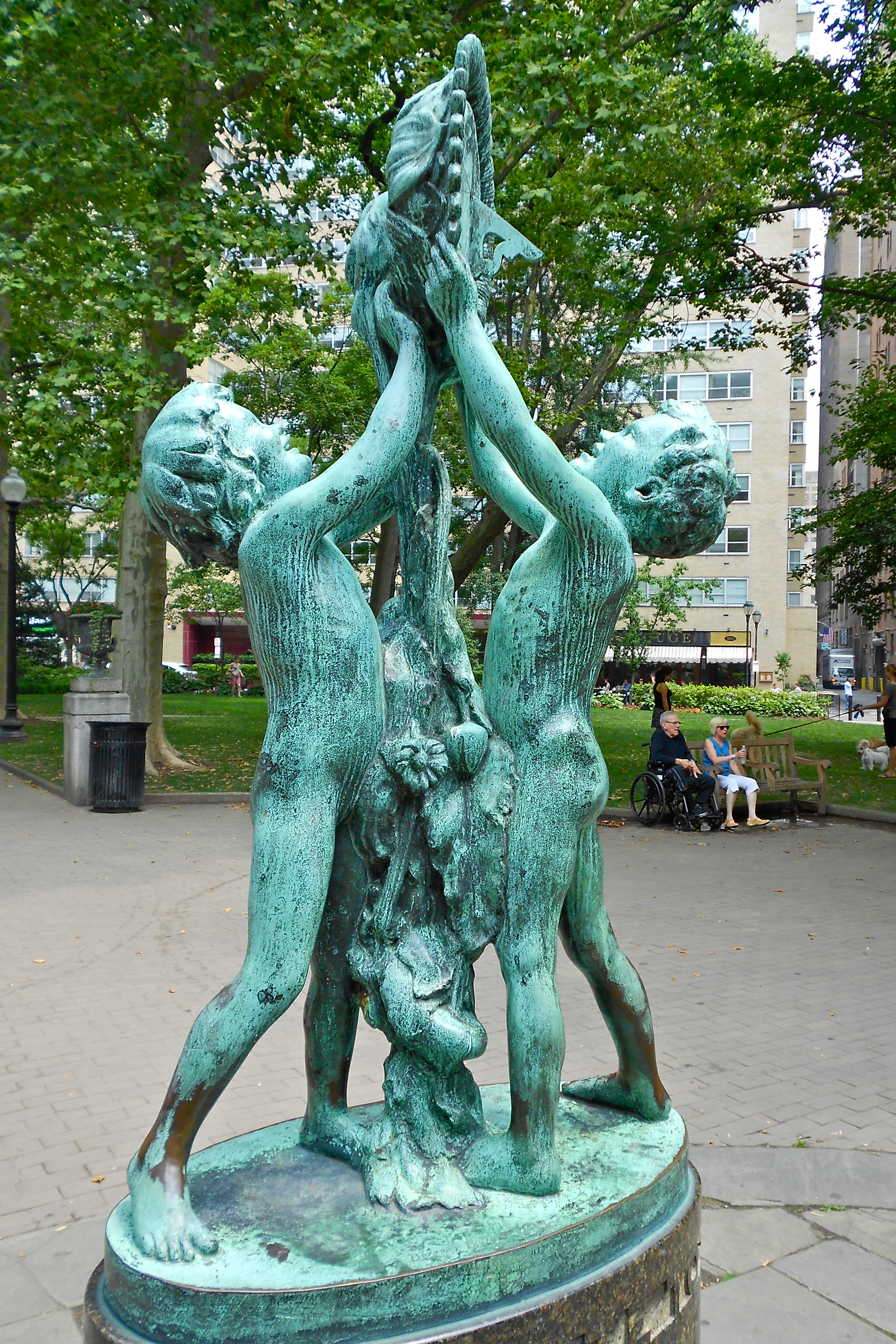
Evelyn Taylor Price Memorial Sundial (1947), Rittenhouse Square, Philadelphia
