= Kent Island High School =

Coordinates: 38.9909°N 76.3094°W

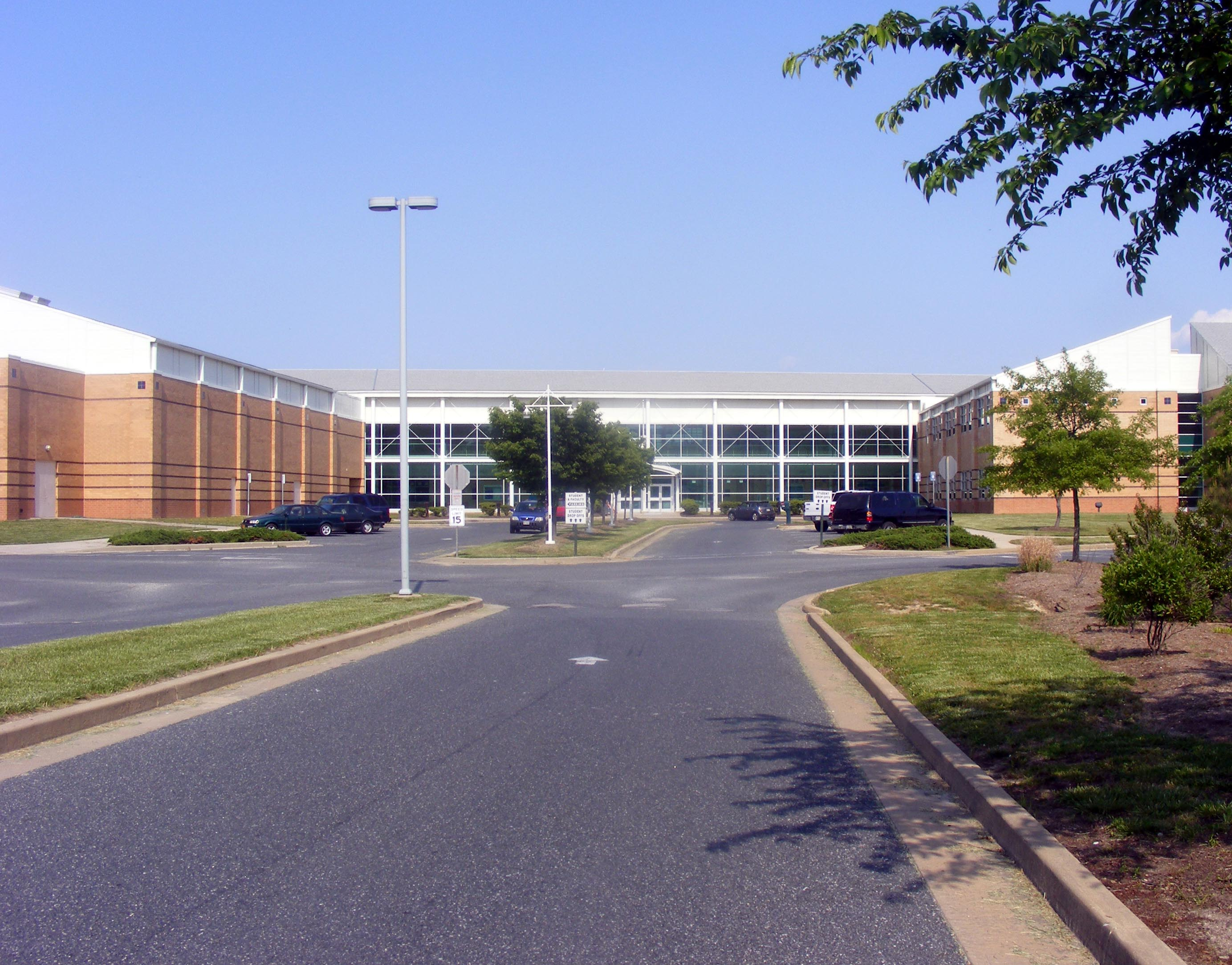
- 900 Love Point Road; Stevensville, Maryland 21666; United States

Information
- Type: Public
- Motto: A collaborative community of learners
- Established: 1998; 28 years ago
- School district: Queen Anne's County Public Schools
- Principal: Dan Harding
- Campus: Suburban
- Colors: Blue and silver
- Mascot: Buccaneers
- Yearbook: Fore & Aft
- Website: https://www.qacps.org/kihs/

Kent Island High School (KIHS) is a public high school in Stevensville, Maryland, United States that first opened in 1998 to accommodate the growing population of Queen Anne's County. The school takes its name from Kent Island, the location of the school (and the entire census-designated place of Stevensville).

The school is often seen as the successor to Stevensville High School, which closed in 1966, and was renovated and reopened as Stevensville Middle School. The two schools have similar school colors and mascots (SHS's colors and mascot were blue and gold and the Pirates, compared to navy blue and silver and the Buccaneers of KIHS). Between 1966 and 1998, residents of Kent Island attended Queen Anne's County High School.

Kent Island High School serves grades 9-12. Kent Island High School's sports teams are members of the Bayside conference and 2A East region in Maryland.

== History ==
A fire broke out in a boys' bathroom at Kent Island High School on 26 September 2012. Nearly twenty-five volunteer firefighters, of the Kent Island Volunteer Fire Department, responded to the blaze; a police investigation valued damages to approximately $5,000.

In May 2018, the men's junior varsity lacrosse team season was canceled due to a video of hazing that included team members rubbing their genitals and buttocks into another teammate's face. Five players on the team were changed for the incident.

There was a bomb threat in 2018 and another in 2019, though no bombs were ever found. A 14 year old male was charged for the 2019 bomb threat.

The Kent Island High School basketball team was reported to have used racial slurs during a game against Parkside High School in December of 2021. In 2022, parents from another county took a photo at a KIHS track meet showing "a stuffed monkey tied upside down next to a black history month poster." On February 24th, 2023, Parkside High School forfeited a game with Kent Island High School due to allegations of racial slurs being used by the KIHS team and fans. Queen Anne's County Public Schools could not verify the use of slurs. At the game, a Parkside High School player team punched a member of the Kent Island team. James Jones, Convener of the Caucus of African-American Leaders on the Eastern Shore, said "this is not the first, or the second, third or fourth time that these kinds of incidents have happened [from Kent Island High School]."

== Athletics ==
- Fall sports
  - Cheerleading
  - Cross Country
  - Dance
  - Field Hockey
  - Football
  - Golf
  - Marching Band
  - Mountain Biking
  - Sailing
  - Soccer (men's and women's)
  - Volleyball
- Winter sports
  - Basketball (men's and women's)
  - Ice Hockey
  - Indoor Track
  - Swimming
  - Wrestling
- Spring sports
  - Baseball
  - Corollary tennis
  - Lacrosse (men's and women's)
  - Sailing
  - Softball
  - Tennis
  - Track and Field
