= Queen Anne's County High School =

Coordinates: 39.0377°N 76.0507°W

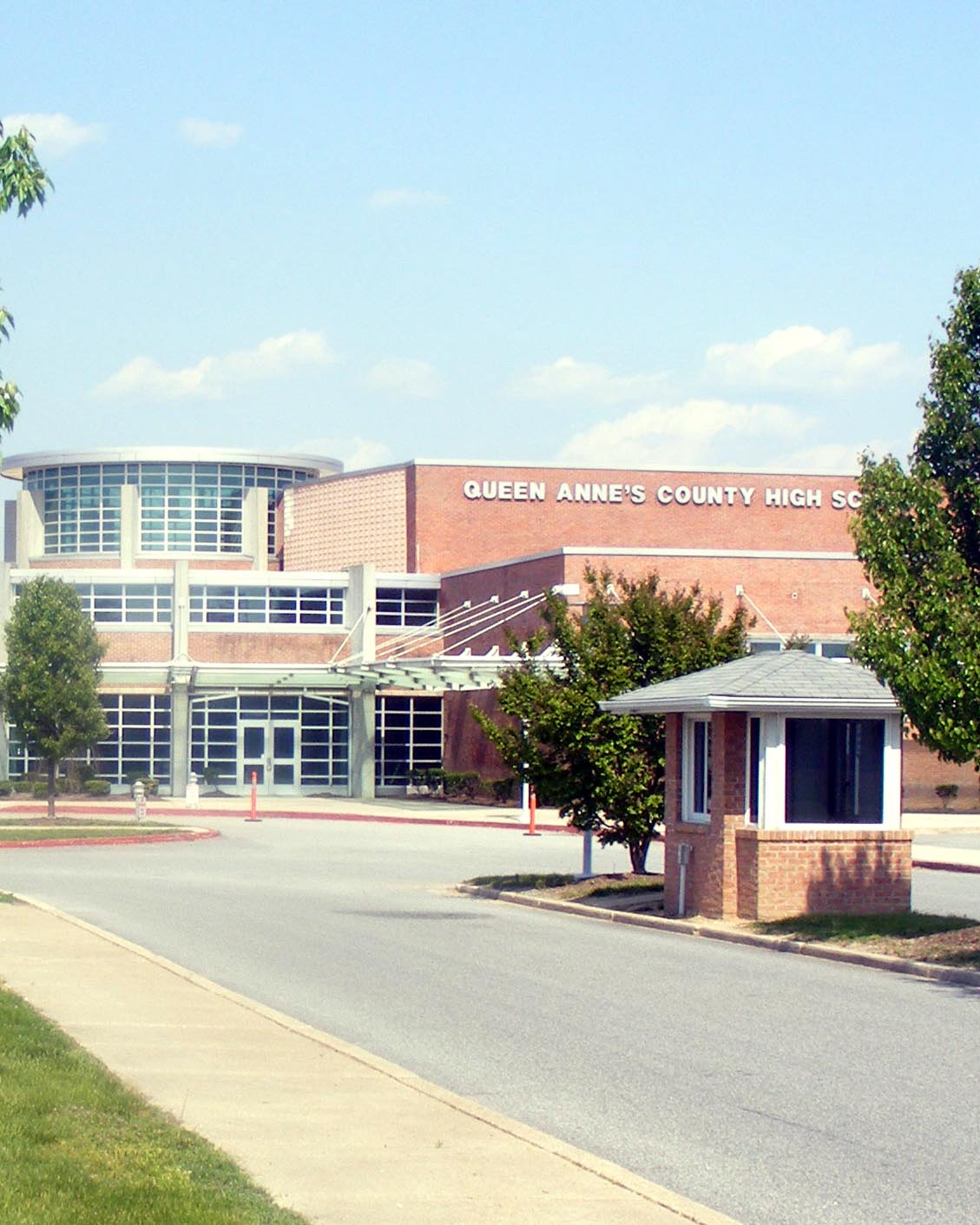

Location
- 125 Ruthsburg Road; Queen Anne's County, Maryland; Centreville, MD, Maryland 21617; United States

Information
- Type: Public high school
- Opened: 1966; 60 years ago
- School district: Queen Anne's County Public Schools
- Superintendent: Matthew Kibbler
- NCES School ID: 240054001195
- Dean: Kristin Hurlock
- Principal: Lou Sheppard
- Teaching staff: 79 (on an FTE basis)
- Grades: 9–12
- Enrollment: 1,223 (2024-2025)
- Campus: Rural
- Colors: Green and Gold
- Slogan: "Pride Of The Eastern Shore"
- Athletics conference: 2A
- Mascot: Lion
- Nickname: QA
- Rival: Kent Island High School
- Newspaper: “Pride Post”
- Yearbook: "The Pride"
- Website: Queen Anne's County HS website

Queen Anne's County High School (QACHS) is a four-year public high school in Centreville, Queen Anne's County, Maryland, United States. It is one of two public high schools in Queen Anne's County along with Kent Island High School.

== Overview ==
The school is located on the Eastern Shore of Maryland in the town of Centreville, MD. The school is on Maryland Route 304, south of Maryland Route 305, east of Maryland Route 213, and west of U.S. Route 301. The current building was built in 1966.

The school was created with the desegregation of the school system in 1966, twelve years after Brown vs. Board of Education was ruled. The high school for African Americans, the Kennard School, was closed and turned into the present Kennard Elementary School. The three White schools - Centreville High School, Sudlersville High School, and Stevensville High School - were closed and turned into middle schools.

The current principal is Mr. Lou Sheppard.

== Students ==
Student population

Year	Pop.	±%
1993	1,529	—
1994	1,519	−0.7%
1995	1,533	+0.9%
1996	1,590	+3.7%
1997	1,636	+2.9%
1998	1,728	+5.6%
1999	1,108	−35.9%
2000	959	−13.4%
2001	935	−2.5%

Year	Pop.	±%
2002	912	−2.5%
2003	1,021	+12.0%
2004	1,060	+3.8%
2005	1,094	+3.2%
2006	1,175	+7.4%
2007	1,225	+4.3%
2008	1,199	−2.1%
2009	1,240	+3.4%

== Sports ==
State Champions

- 2024 - Women’s Soccer
- 2021 - Women’s Lacrosse
- 2010 - Boys' Lacrosse
- 2009 - Swimming
- 1978 - Baseball

State Finalist

- Boys' Swimming- 2014
- Boys' Track & Field- 1985, 2012
- Girls' Lacrosse- 2012, 2024
- Boys' Ballet- 2010
- Boys' Soccer- 2012
- Ice Hockey (Co-Opp)- 2012
- Boys' Lacrosse- 2009
- Football- 2009
- Girls' Soccer- 2003

State Semi-Finalist

- Girls' Lacrosse- 2007, 09, 10, 13, 14
- Field Hockey- 2011, 2023, 2024
- Boys' Lacrosse-1999, 2011
- Girls' Lacrosse-2011
- Football-2004, 08, 10
- Boys' Soccer- 1974, 1975, 2005, 06, 2023
- Girls' Soccer- 2004
- Boys' Lacrosse-1999, 2000
- Unisex Badminton-1966

State Quarter-Finalist

- Football- 1985, 1999

Bayside Champions

- soccer -1996

== See also ==
- List of high schools in Maryland
- Queen Anne's County Public Schools

== References and notes ==
http://qacps.schoolwires.net/qhs, https://web.archive.org/web/20140512144253/http://qacps.schoolwires.net/Domain/123
