= Emily Clayton Bishop =

American sculptor (1883–1912)

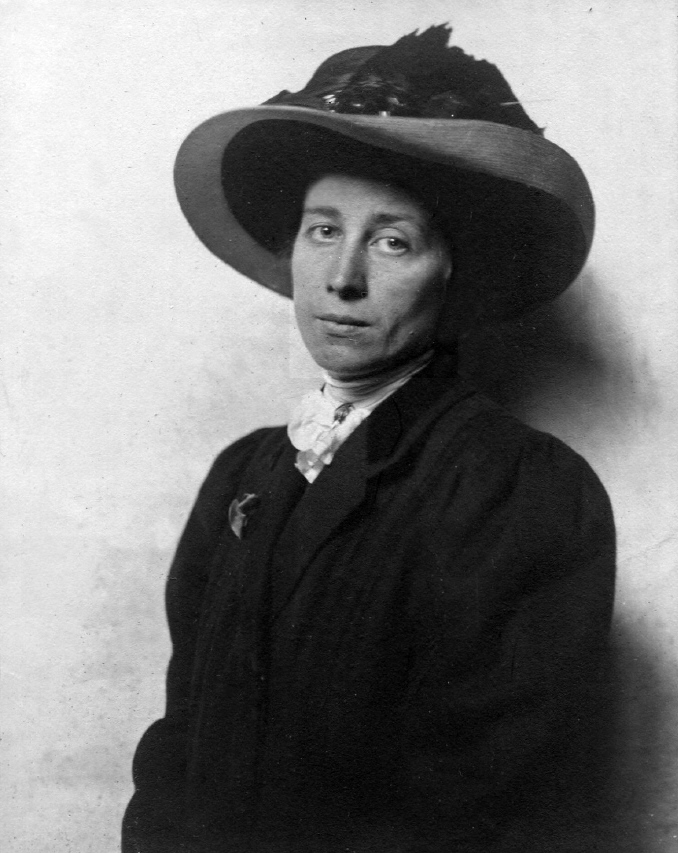
- Emily Clayton Bishop
- Born: April 23, 1883; Cavetown, Maryland, U.S.
- Died: March 1, 1912 (aged 28); Smithsburg, Maryland, U.S.
- Known for: Bronze sculpture

Emily Clayton Bishop (April 23, 1883 – March 1, 1912) was an American prize-winning sculptor. Although she died at a young age, her works in bronze and plaster are found in museum collections such as the Smithsonian American Art Museum and in shows such as Modern Women at PAFA (2013). Her childhood home, the Emily Clayton Bishop house, is a Maryland State historic site. The home sold in 2019 for $115,000.

== Early life ==
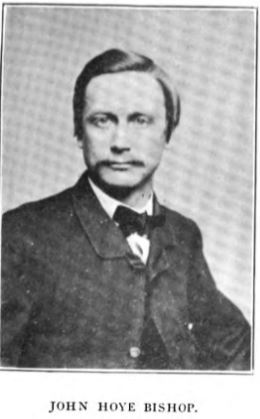
John Hoye Bishop

Emily Louise Clayton Bishop was born to John Hoye Bishop and Alice (Besore) Bishop on April 23, 1883, in Cavetown, Maryland. John Bishop was civil engineer and the family was prominent in the community. As of 1888, Alice B. Bishop purchased the deed of 66 South Main Street, Smithsburg, for $1650. The house, now known as the Emily Clayton Bishop house, is now a Maryland State historic site.

== Education ==
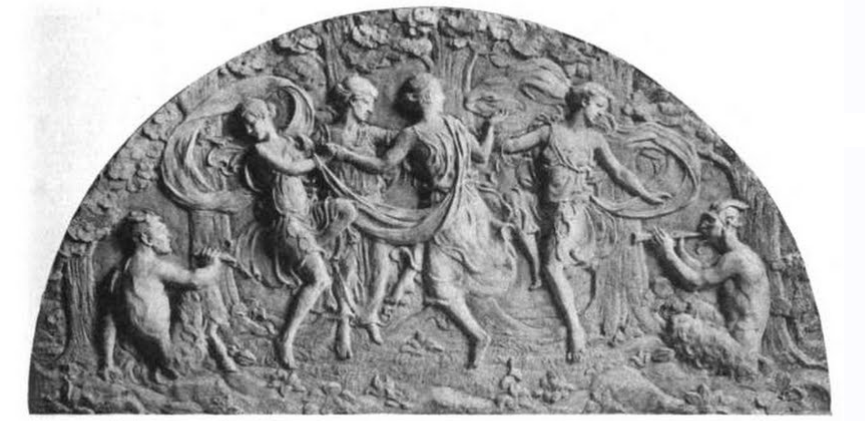
"Dance of Youth in the Spring" by Emily Clayton Bishop, 1917

Emily Clayton Bishop attended public schools before going to St. Mary's Female Seminary, in St. Mary's City, Maryland. She graduated in 1890. She then attended the Maryland Institute of Art and Design in Baltimore, Maryland from 1901 to 1904. In addition Johns Hopkins University awarded her a teacher's certificate in Art Interpretation and criticism in 1903. She received a scholarship to attend the Pennsylvania Academy of the Fine Arts (PAFA) in Philadelphia. There she studied from 1904 to 1909 with William Merritt Chase. She was regarded as one of PAFA's most promising students, receiving the Packard Prize (1904), the George B. McClellan Anatomy Prize (1905), Honorable Mention in the Edmund Stewardson Competition (1906, 1907, 1910), and the Composition Prize for Sculpture. During this time, she became a friend of Beatrice Fenton and Marjorie Martinet.

She was one of an "exuberant coterie of women artists" who convinced sculpture instructor Charles Grafly to add portrait and composition classes to the sculpture program.

Bishop was able to travel and study in England, Holland, Italy, and Greece with the support of the Cresson Traveling Scholarship (1907–1908). She was able to study in Paris with Rodin.

She graduated from the Academy and established a studio in Philadelphia. Her works appeared in exhibitions at the Pennsylvania Academy (1907, 1910, 1911, 1912), the Chicago Art Institute, and the Baltimore Exhibition of the National Sculpture Society.

== Death ==
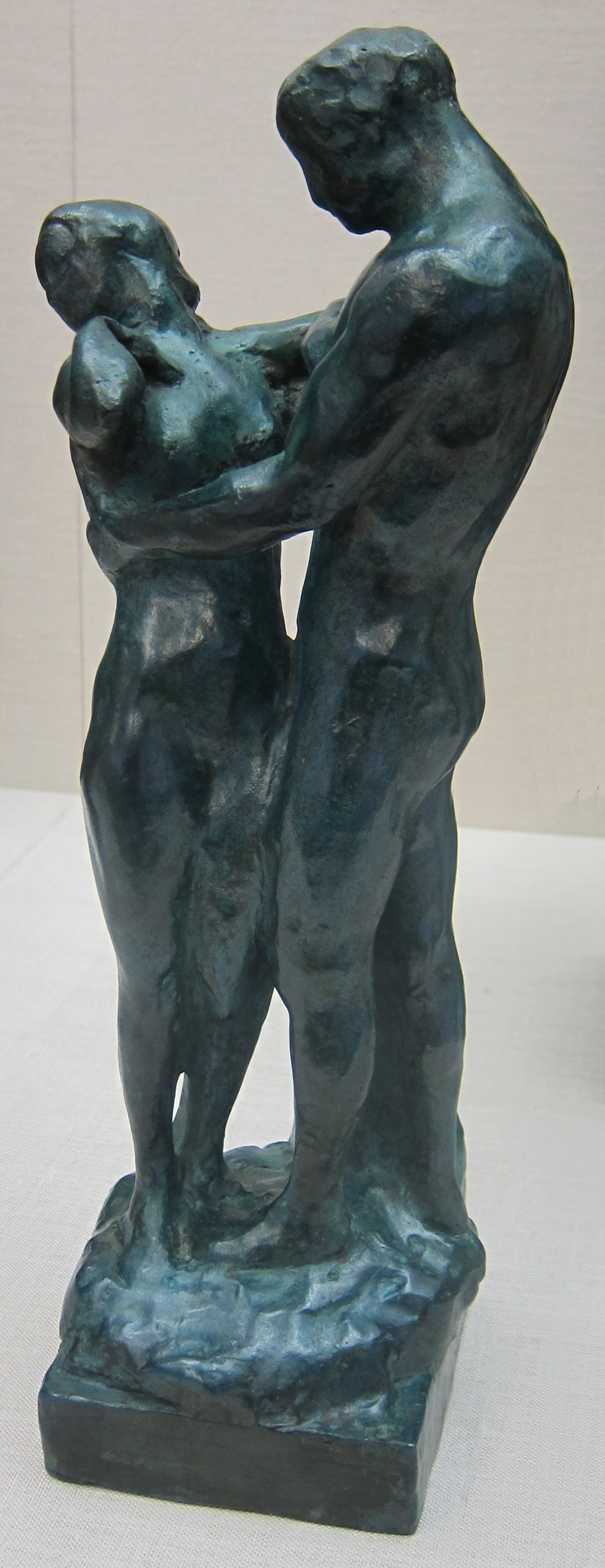
Classicism and the Renaissance by Emily Clayton Bishop, 1907

Bishop died Friday, March 1, 1912 and was buried in Smithsburg Cemetery, Smithsburg, Maryland. Her cause of death was given in her obituary as "heart disease", but it has been suggested that she died of tuberculosis.

Her obituary appeared in The New York Times, where she was referred to as "one of the most promising of America's younger sculptors." At the time of her death, the Philadelphia Academy of Music was installing memorial tablet that Bishop had completed in honor of the director of the Orpheus Club. Three more of her works were on display at PAFA's annual exhibition: "Woman Knitting", "Portrate of Browning", and "John".

After her death, the Pennsylvania Academy held a memorial exhibit of twenty of her bronze sculptures. Sixteen of her works were shown in San Francisco, California at the 1915 Panama–Pacific International Exposition. She was included in a show of fifty leading women sculptors at The Plastic Club in Philadelphia in 1917, where her bas-relief "Dance of Youth in the Spring" was displayed.

Her friend sculptor Beatrice Fenton donated a collection of Bishop's works to the Philadelphia Museum of Art and National Museum of American Art.

Her works are in museum collections in the United States, including the Smithsonian American Art Museum in Washington, D.C. The Smithsburg Historical Society in Smithsburg, Maryland holds a substantial collection of her works. In 1983 a centennial exhibition of her work was held at the Washington County Museum of Fine Arts. Her friend and fellow artist Beatrice Fenton preserved many of Bishop's papers and works. A retrospective exhibit of 62 pieces of Bishop's work was held at the Renfrew Museum in Waynesboro, Pennsylvania in 2010. Bishop was included in PAFA's exhibition "Modern Women at PAFA: From Cassatt to O'Keeffe" in 2013. The Washington County Museum of Fine Arts includes at least four works by Bishop in its collection.
