= Allegany High School =

Location
- 900 Seton Drive; Cumberland, Maryland 21502; United States; 39°39′19″N 78°47′43″W

Information
- Other name: Alco
- Former name: Allegany County High School
- Type: Public high school
- Established: 1887
- School board: Allegany County Board of Education
- School district: Allegany County Public Schools
- Oversight: Maryland State Department of Education
- Superintendent: Dr. Michael J. Martirano
- Principal: Scott Bauer
- Faculty: 43.3 (on an FTE basis)
- Grades: 9–12
- Enrollment: 671 (as of 2014-15)
- Student to teacher ratio: 15.5:1
- Colors: Blue and white
- Mascot: Camper
- Nickname: Campers
- Feeder schools: Braddock Middle School
- Website: acps.ss5.sharpschool.com/our_schools/allegany_high_school

Allegany High School is a public high school in Cumberland, Maryland, United States. It is part of Allegany County Public Schools. Allegany High School was built as Allegany County High School in 1887, hence it is often referred to as 'Alco'.

As of the 2014–2015 school year, the school had an enrollment of 671 students and 43.3 classroom teachers (on an FTE basis), for a student–teacher ratio of 15.5:1. There were 252 students (37.6% of enrollment) eligible for free lunch and 30 (4.5% of students) eligible for reduced-cost lunch. Students were 93% white, 5% African-American and 2% Asian. Allegany High School's most historic and well-known rivalry is with Fort Hill High School, a long-standing and passionate football rivalry that began in 1936.

== History ==
Allegany High School was initially a secondary education school held in the Maryland Avenue Schoolhouse. The school had many different locations including the building on Greene Street, which was used as a combined middle/high school until the spring of 1926.

The old Allegany High located on Sedgwick Street that served the area for 93 years was demolished May 2022. Construction of the Sedgwick Street school started in 1925 with the doors opening in 1926.

In the fall of 2018 the doors of the brand new Allegany High School located at 900 Seton Drive on the site of the former Sacred Heart Hospital on Haystack Mountain were opened. The new school cost $51 million.

The “Camper” mascot is a source of much confusion. The most widely accepted theory is that Civil War General Lew Wallace and his men began calling the site "Campobello" that during their time here. The word Campobello is derived from Latin, meaning "camp of war".

== Athletics ==
=== State championships ===
Girls' cross country:

- 2A Individual 3.0 miles 1991
- 1A 1997, 1998
- 1A Individual 3.0 miles 1998, 1999, 2005, 2006, 2007

Boys' cross country:

- Class A Individual 2.5 miles 1969
- Class A 1970
- 2A 1993
- 2A Individual 3.0 miles 1995, 1996
- 1A Individual 3.0 miles 2002, 2010

Football:

- Class B 1978, 1980, 1983
- 2A 1988, 1989, 1991
- 1A 2001
- 1AW 2005

Girls' basketball:

- Mildred Haney Murray Sportsmanship Award 1999
- 1A 2000

Boys' basketball:

- Pre-MPSSAA 1927, 1930, 1931, 1932, 1933, 1934, 1936, 1937
- Class A 1947, 1950, 1954, 1963
- Class AA 1964
- Class B 1993
- Jack Willard Sportsmanship Award 1993

Baseball:

- 2A 1989, 1990, 1A 2025

Softball:

- 1A 1999, 2010, 2022, 2024

== Extracurricular activities ==
The 'Alco White' mock trial team is one of the many organizations in the school. In the 2005–2006 season, the team won the circuit and the regional championships, advancing to the Maryland state Mock Trial Final Four competition in April 2006. The 2006–2007 team lost in the finals to Severn School. The 2007–08 team advanced to the semi-finals, but were defeated by Severna Park. The 2008-2009 team won the Maryland State Mock Trial Championship, the program's first state title after making it to the final four in the previous three competitions.

The Allegany marching band was under the direction of Larry T. Jackson, and is a part of the Tournament of Bands circuit, which covers Pennsylvania, New Jersey, Maryland, Delaware, West Virginia, and Virginia. The band had a chapter championships winning streak of 17 years and has finished in the top 10 at the Atlantic Coast Championships for the past 19 seasons. The team finished in second place in 2015 ("For Whom the Bell Tolls" with a 97.15) and third place finalists in 2016 ("Across the Divide" with a 95.65). They won the Atlantic Coast Championships in November 2021 with "Gravity", a clean sweep - Best Music, Best Percussion, Best Visual and Best Auxiliary - a sweet send-off to Jackson's retirement at the end of the school year. The Marching Band repeated the feat in 2022, 2023, and 2024 under the direction of Kenneth Pfromm.

The school also sponsors indoor color guard and indoor percussion groups. The Allegany Visual Ensemble was the 2011 Winter Guard International Pittsburgh Regional Scholastic Regional A Champions.

== Notable alumni ==
- Mark Baker - actor
- Rod Breedlove - NFL player
- Earle Bruce - former Ohio State head football coach
- Eddie Deezen – actor
- Jim Gaffney - NFL player
- Frances Hughes Glendening (1969) – former First Lady of Maryland
- Aaron Laffey – Major League Baseball pitcher
- William H. Macy – actor
- Tommy Mont - educator, university administrator, college football coach, and National Football League (NFL) player

== See also ==
- List of high schools in Maryland
