= Boonsboro High School =

Location
- 10 Campus Avenue; Boonsboro, Maryland 21713; United States
- 39°30′58″N 77°39′6″W

Information
- Type: Public secondary
- Established: 1958
- NCES School ID: 240066001256
- Principal: Michael Kuhaneck
- Teaching staff: 50.80 (on an FTE basis)
- Grades: 9–12
- Enrollment: 838 (2024–25)
- Student to teacher ratio: 16.50
- Colors: Blue, Orange and White
- Mascot: Warrior
- Accreditation: Blue Ribbon 2013
- Website: bhs.wcpsmd.com

Boonsboro High School (BHS) is a public high school (grades 9 to 12) in Boonsboro, Washington County, Maryland, United States.

== Facilities ==
The present school building was created in 1958 and renovated in 1975 and 2006. The 1975–76 renovation changed the school from a campus of four buildings situated on a hill to one larger building that combined three of the four original buildings, plus the expanded shop building. The school's central feature is a ramp that leads from the varsity gym up to the cafeteria. The school stands at 140,486 square feet (13,051.6 m^{2}) and enrolls approximately 902 students.

In sports, the school rivals Smithsburg High School and Williamsport High School in Washington County.

== Academic recognition ==
Boonsboro High School was named in U.S. News & World Report's annual listing of the Best High Schools in the United States, earning a Silver Award for test scores consistently above state and national averages.

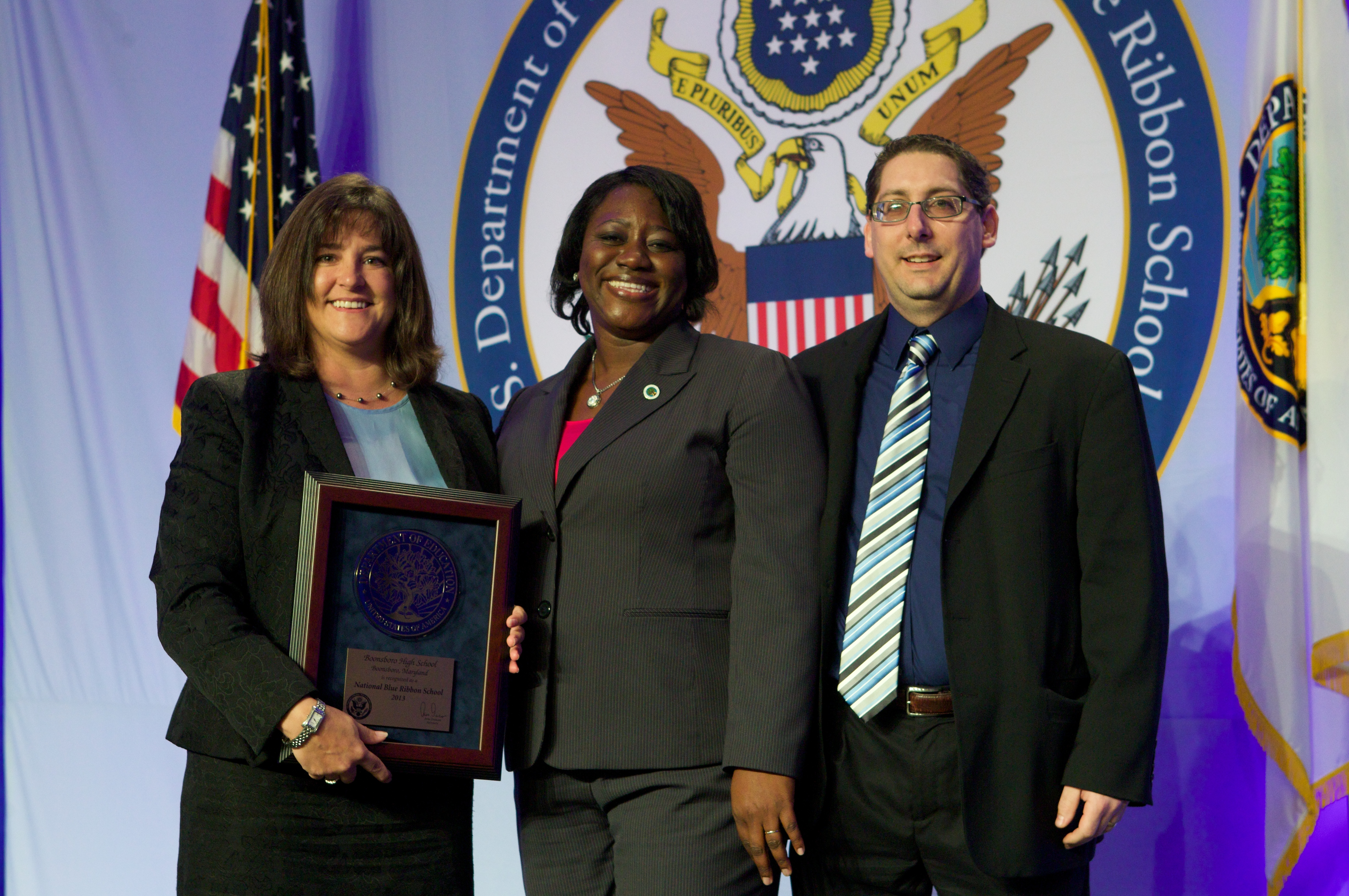
2013 National Blue Ribbon Schools winner

In 2013, Boonsboro was named as one of two high schools by the Maryland State Department of Education as a "Blue Ribbon School."

Additionally, the Boonsboro Warrior Academic Team has dominated the Washington County Academic Tournament since the tournament's inception, undefeated from 2018-2022 and with a total of 13 wins since Coach Tracy Salka took over the team in 2004 until her retirement in 2022.

== Notable alumni ==
- Garrett Stephenson — former MLB player (St. Louis Cardinals)
