= Smithsburg, Maryland =

- Town
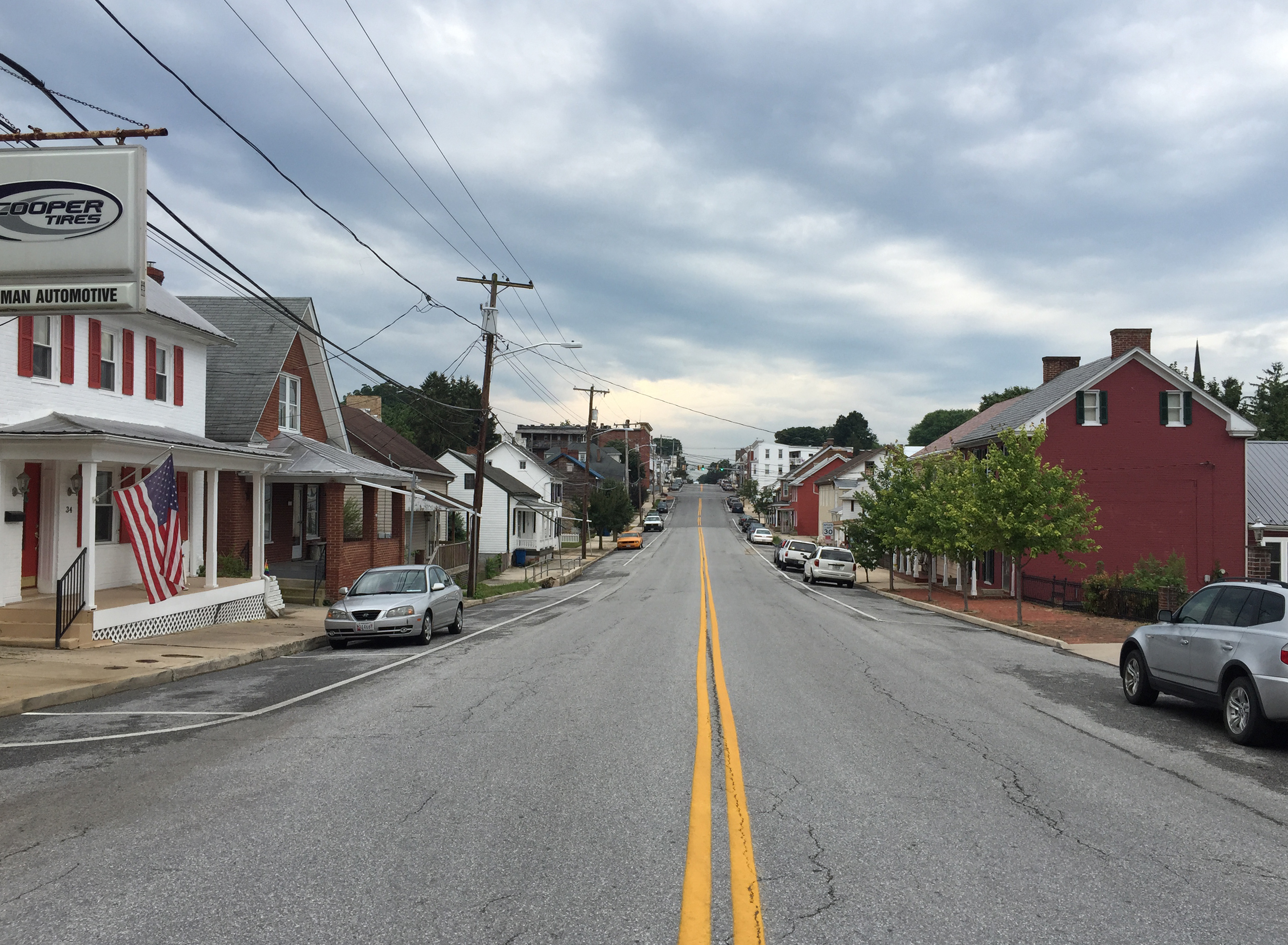

- Flag Seal

- Location of Smithsburg, Maryland
- Coordinates: 39°39′21″N 77°34′30″W
- Country: United States
- State: Maryland
- County: Washington
- Established: 1812
- Incorporated: 1841

Area
  - Total: 1.17 sq mi (3.02 km^{2})
  - Land: 1.16 sq mi (3.00 km^{2})
  - Water: 0.0077 sq mi (0.02 km^{2})
- Elevation: 742 ft (226 m)

Population (2020)
  - Total: 2,977
  - Density: 2,571/sq mi (992.5/km^{2})
- Time zone: UTC-5 (Eastern (EST))
  - Summer (DST): UTC-4 (EDT)
- ZIP code: 21783
- Area codes: 301, 240
- FIPS code: 24-72900
- GNIS feature ID: 2391415
- Website: www.townofsmithsburg.org

Smithsburg is a town in Washington County, Maryland, United States. The population was 2,977 at the 2020 census. Smithsburg is close to the former Fort Ritchie army base and just west of the presidential retreat Camp David.

== History ==
Smithsburg, Maryland, was founded in 1812 by Christopher "Stuffle" Smith. He purchased a plot of land formerly known as "part of Shadrack's Lot." The community's development was directly influenced by factors such as migration paths, the arrival of the railroad, and advances in agricultural technology. By 1923, much of the existing village had been erected. Smithsburg was incorporated in 1846.

Smithsburg acted as a hospital town during the American Civil War in 1862, treating wounded soldiers from nearby battles at South Mountain and Antietam. On July 5, 1863, Confederate General James Stuart and Union General Kilpatrick exchanged artillery fire over Smithsburg. A cannon ball from this exchange can be found lodged in the wall of a building on Water Street. Kilpatrick continued the advance to Boonsboro, Maryland after the engagement on July 6.

An incident involving slaves in May 1845 proved to be violent for the people of Smithsburg. Twelve runaway slaves from Leesburg, Virginia had been seeking their way to freedom in the North when a man who considered himself to be a professional slave catcher, who had only supposed the group to be runaways, noticed the party making their way past his home at three o’clock in the morning. Beckoning the town constable and six other men to apprehend the runaways, the supposed leader exclaimed, "Now, boys, G-d d--n you, fight!" Armed with pistols and tomahawks, the Virginia runaways had the upper hand as the rural Smithsburg men only exhibited clubs and sticks for protection. A skirmish took place which badly wounded some of the Smithsburg men: "Constable Flora was twice knocked down, Price had his arm nearly severed and the bone broken, by a blow from a tomahawk he also had a pistol snapped in his face, which unfortunately failed to go off...Shank was several times felled to the earth, and the whole party more or less injured." Despite their efforts, only four slaves were captured—two by the Smithsburg troop and two more in an adjoining town, Leitersburg—yet the bulk of the runaways presumably were successful in their audacious escape into Pennsylvania.

During the Gettysburg Campaign, on the afternoon of July 5, 1863, Federal cavalry defended Smithsburg from an attack led by General J.E.B. Stuart and Confederate cavalry during their retreat from the Battle of Gettysburg.

President Lyndon Johnson, his wife Lady Bird Johnson, and their daughter Lynda Bird Johnson, visited St. Ann's Episcopal Church in Smithsburg on Easter Sunday, March 26, 1967. During his term, Johnson visited Smithsburg many times due to its close proximity to Camp David. In 1963, President and First Lady Johnson were on their way from Camp David to a Church in Hagerstown, Maryland. Along their route was a junkyard known as "Elwoods Auto Exchange" which the first lady felt "ruined the beautiful landscape". She requested the driver pull the limousine onto the shoulder of the road. She then marched up the dirt road to the main office and proceeded to give Elwoods Grimm "a piece of her mind regarding the unsightliness of the wrecking yard." Two years following this occurrence the Highway Beautification Act was passed by Congress. The Auto Exchange is still in operation and is now hidden by a line of pine trees which blocks its view from the main highway. While there is no documentation of Lady Bird's rant, several documents are available through the Lyndon Baines Johnson Library and Museum which show her acknowledgements of the unsightliness of the Auto Exchange.

On June 9, 2022, three people were killed and a fourth was wounded in a mass shooting that occurred at Columbia Machine, Inc., previously known as Bikle Manufacturing. Shortly after, a state trooper was wounded as well by a suspect during an exchange of gunfire. The suspect was then arrested and subsequently charged, and he was later indicted for murder, attempted murder and using a firearm during a violent crime in July 2022.

The CEO of Northrop Grumman, an award winner of the Collier Trophy, the highest recognition possible for aeronautics or astronautics in America, grew up in Smithsburg.

== Geography ==
According to the United States Census Bureau, the town has a total area of 1.06 square miles (2.75 km^{2}), of which 1.05 square miles (2.72 km^{2}) is land and 0.01 square miles (0.03 km^{2}) is water. The only body of water that is within the limits of Smithsburg is the now inactive Smithsburg reservoir.

Smithsburg is characterized by rolling hills and open space. The town is well known for its farming community, including apple orchards and dairy farms.

=== Climate ===
Due to Smithsburg's location between the Appalachian Mountains and the Chesapeake Bay watershed, its climate is considered mild to moderate. The area has warm, humid summers and winters with temperatures hovering around freezing point.

== Transportation ==
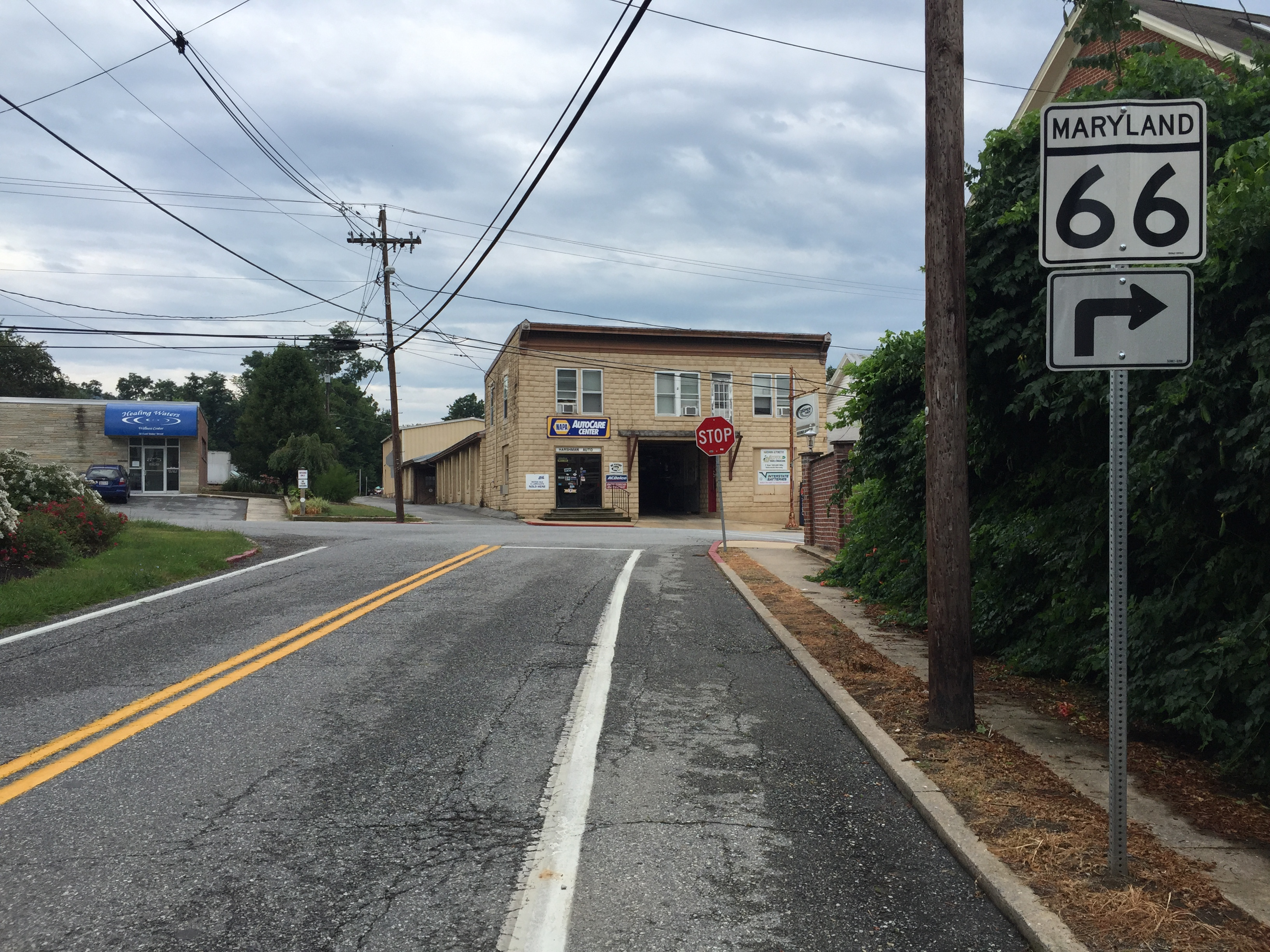
MD 66 entering central Smithsburg

The main method of travel to and from Smithsburg is by road. Maryland Route 66 is the only highway directly serving the town, following the old alignment of Maryland Route 64 through the middle of town. MD 66 connects with MD 64 just outside of the town limits on both the north and south ends, while Maryland Route 77 terminates at MD 64 just southeast of the town limits. Interstate 70 is accessible via MD 66, while Hagerstown can be reached via MD 64 and Thurmont via MD 77 to Thurmont.

== Demographics ==
Historical population
Census	Pop.	Note	%±
1850	366		—
1860	475		29.8%
1870	459		−3.4%
1880	433		−5.7%
1890	487		12.5%
1900	462		−5.1%
1910	481		4.1%
1920	586		21.8%
1930	598		2.0%
1940	619		3.5%
1950	641		3.6%
1960	586		−8.6%
1970	671		14.5%
1980	833		24.1%
1990	1,221		46.6%
2000	2,146		75.8%
2010	2,975		38.6%
2020	2,977		0.1%
U.S. Decennial Census

=== 2020 census ===
As of the 2020 census, Smithsburg had a population of 2,977. The median age was 36.1 years. 27.6% of residents were under the age of 18 and 11.0% of residents were 65 years of age or older. For every 100 females there were 91.2 males, and for every 100 females age 18 and over there were 90.3 males age 18 and over.

100.0% of residents lived in urban areas, while 0.0% lived in rural areas.

There were 1,051 households in Smithsburg, of which 43.6% had children under the age of 18 living in them. Of all households, 57.3% were married-couple households, 12.8% were households with a male householder and no spouse or partner present, and 24.3% were households with a female householder and no spouse or partner present. About 19.2% of all households were made up of individuals and 9.4% had someone living alone who was 65 years of age or older.

There were 1,103 housing units, of which 4.7% were vacant. The homeowner vacancy rate was 1.7% and the rental vacancy rate was 2.9%.

Racial composition as of the 2020 census
Race	Number	Percent
White	2,551	85.7%
Black or African American	111	3.7%
American Indian and Alaska Native	21	0.7%
Asian	39	1.3%
Native Hawaiian and Other Pacific Islander	0	0.0%
Some other race	50	1.7%
Two or more races	205	6.9%
Hispanic or Latino (of any race)	194	6.5%

=== 2010 census ===
As of the census of 2010, there were 2,975 people, 1,012 households, and 791 families living in the town. The population density was 2,833.3 inhabitants per square mile (1,093.9/km^{2}). There were 1,082 housing units at an average density of 1,030.5 per square mile (397.9/km^{2}). The racial makeup of the town was 91.7% White, 4.2% African American, 0.2% Native American, 1.0% Asian, 0.8% from other races, and 2.0% from two or more races. Hispanic or Latino of any race were 4.0% of the population.

There were 1,012 households, of which 49.8% had children under the age of 18 living with them, 59.8% were married couples living together, 13.9% had a female householder with no husband present, 4.4% had a male householder with no wife present, and 21.8% were non-families. 18.6% of all households were made up of individuals, and 6.7% had someone living alone who was 65 years of age or older. The average household size was 2.94 and the average family size was 3.35.

The median age in the town was 32.9 years. 32.6% of residents were under the age of 18; 8.2% were between the ages of 18 and 24; 29.1% were from 25 to 44; 22.8% were from 45 to 64; and 7.5% were 65 years of age or older. The gender makeup of the town was 47.9% male and 52.1% female.

=== 2000 census ===
As of the census of 2000, there were 2,146 people, 728 households, and 561 families living in the town. The population density was 2,352.5 inhabitants per square mile (908.3/km^{2}). There were 763 housing units at an average density of 836.4 per square mile (322.9/km^{2}). The racial makeup of the town was 95.25% White, 2.33% African American, 0.37% Native American, 0.65% Asian, 0.05% Pacific Islander, 0.75% from other races, and 0.61% from two or more races. Hispanic or Latino of any race were 2.28% of the population.

There were 728 households, out of which 52.9% had children under the age of 18 living with them, 60.3% were married couples living together, 13.2% had a female householder with no husband present, and 22.9% were non-families. 18.8% of all households were made up of individuals, and 6.9% had someone living alone who was 65 years of age or older. The average household size was 2.95 and the average family size was 3.40.

In the town, the population was spread out, with 35.8% under the age of 18, 6.8% from 18 to 24, 36.2% from 25 to 44, 14.9% from 45 to 64, and 6.4% who were 65 years of age or older. The median age was 31 years. For every 100 females, there were 92.5 males. For every 100 females age 18 and over, there were 91.1 males.

The median income for a household in the town was $50,795, and the median income for a family was $58,958. Males had a median income of $41,700 versus $26,207 for females. The per capita income for the town was $18,373. About 6.8% of families and 7.7% of the population were below the poverty line, including 8.5% of those under age 18 and 14.7% of those age 65 or over.

== Education ==
Smithsburg has three schools: Smithsburg High School (one of seven in Washington County Public Schools), Smithsburg Middle School, and Smithsburg Elementary School. Smithsburg High School currently enrolls 902 students. The 116,260-square-foot (10,801 m^{2}) school was built in 1965. Old Forge Elementary School, located just over a mile outside the town limits, feeds into Smithsburg Middle School.

== Events ==
Smithsburg hosts the annual Steam and Craft Show in September, Smithsburg Hometown Christmas in December, Smithsburg Days in June, and the Smithsburg Community Volunteer Fire Company Carnival every final week of June.

== Notable people ==
- Jeremiah S. Besore (1812–1888), state delegate
- Jessica Fitzwater (born 1983), county executive of Frederick County
- Jim Schlossnagle (born 1970), baseball player and college baseball coach
- Erika Thimey (1910–2006), dancer and educator
- Kathy Warden (born 1970s), CEO and president of Northrop Grumman
