= Fairview Outdoor School =

Claud E. Kitchens Outdoor School at Fairview

Location
- 12808 Draper Road; Clear Spring, Maryland 21722; United States
- Coordinates: 39°39′50″N 77°56′30″W

Information
- School type: Outdoor learning facility
- Opened: 1979
- School district: Washington County Public Schools
- Superintendent: Dr. Clayton Wilcox
- Head teacher: Timothy Abe
- Grades: K–12
- Classes offered: Environmental science and literacy, STEM
- Campus type: Rural
- Website: Official school website WCPS school profile

Claud E. Kitchens Outdoor School at Fairview, formerly known as Fairview Outdoor School and Fairview Outdoor Education Center, is a public school located between Clear Spring and Hancock in western Washington County, Maryland, United States. The school was built in 1979 and serves students in the Washington County Public Schools system as a facility to promote environmental awareness.

The school was renamed as of 9 December 2008 to honor the late former Washington County Public Schools superintendent Claud E. Kitchens, who oversaw the construction of the facility.
