= Wilson School (Clear Spring, Maryland) =

- U.S. National Register of Historic Places
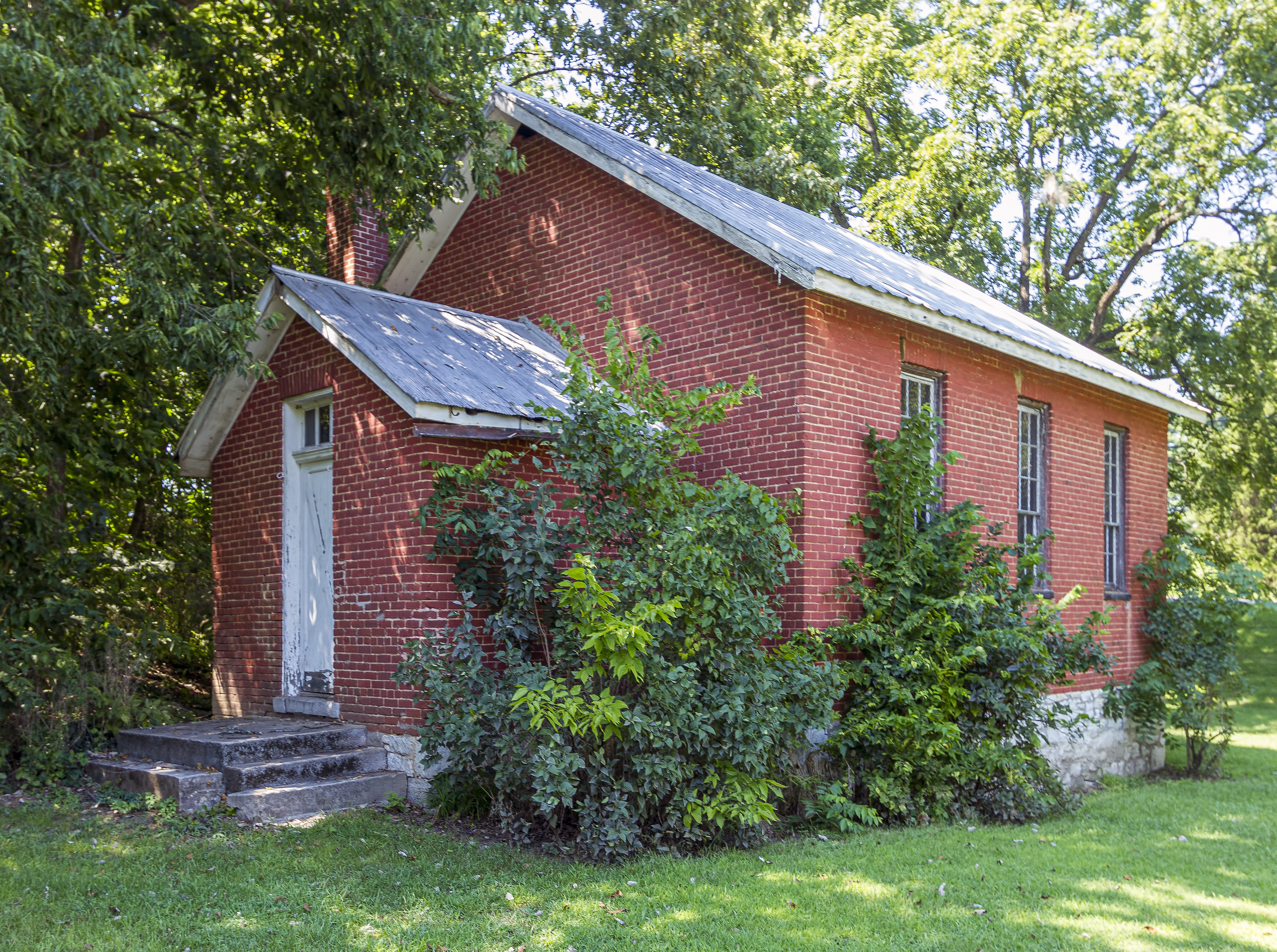

- Location within Maryland Location within the United States
- Location: Rufus Wilson Rd., Clear Spring, Maryland
- Coordinates: 39°39′23″N 77°51′11″W
- Area: 0.5 acres (0.20 ha)
- Built: 1860
- Architectural style: Greek Revival
- NRHP reference No.: 98001293
- Added to NRHP: October 30, 1998

Wilson School is a historic one room school building at Clear Spring, Washington County, Maryland, United States. It is a rectangular brick building, one room wide and three bays deep above a random rubble limestone foundation, built by merchant Rufus Wilson, 1859–1860. The school is representative of a vernacular interpretation of the Greek Revival style. It was incorporated into the county's public education system in the 1890s and remained in use until it closed in 1950, the last operating one-room school in Washington County.

The Wilson School was listed on the National Register of Historic Places in 1998.
