= Washington County Technical High School =

Coordinates: 39°36′51.5″N 77°44′7.7″W

Boyd J. Michael III Technical High School
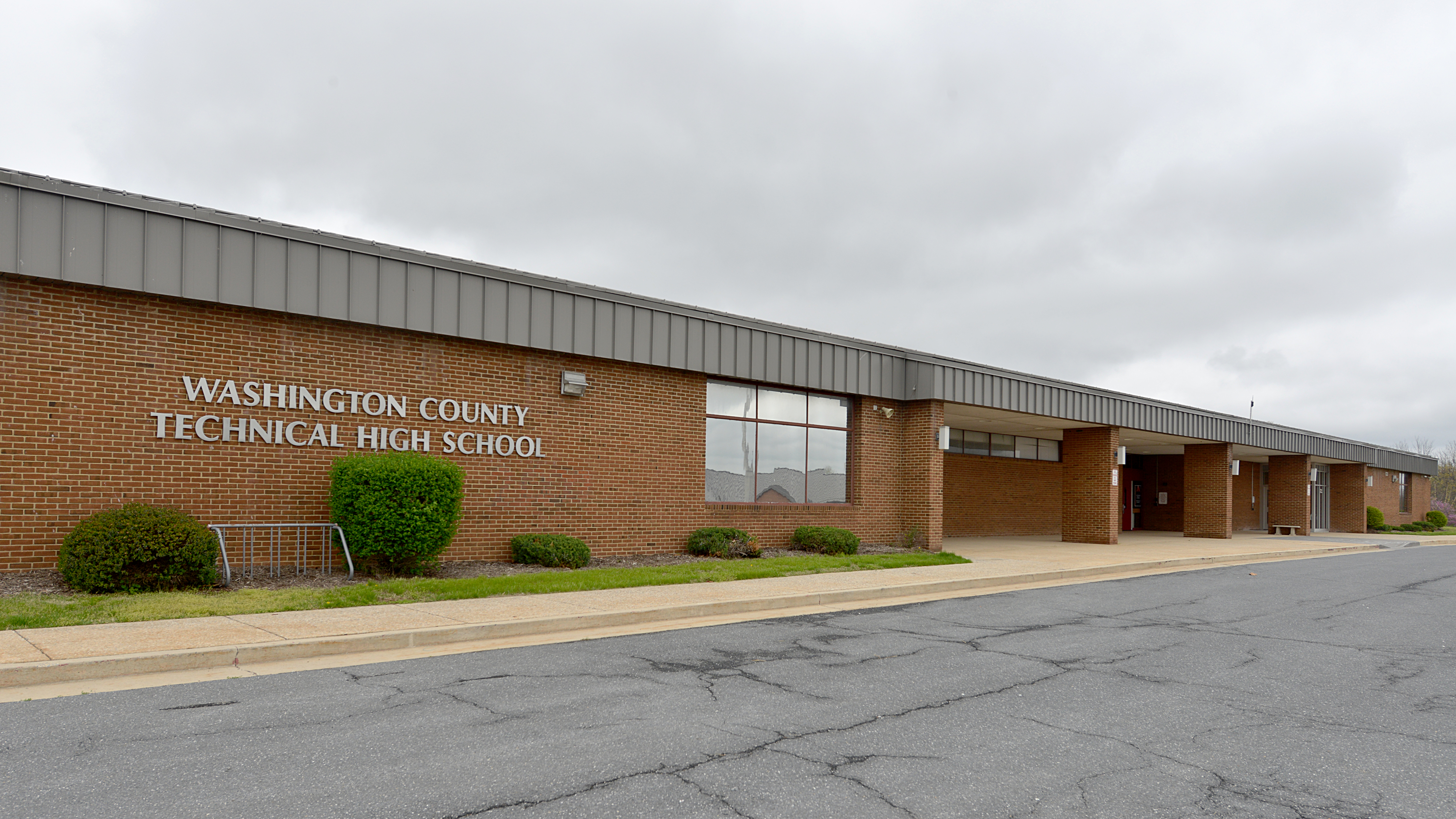
- 50 West Oak Ridge Drive; Hagerstown, Maryland 21740; United States

Information
- Other name: WCTHS
- Principal: Robert Stike
- Grades: 11–12
- Enrollment: 596 (2018–19)
- Website: tech.wcpsmd.com

Boyd J. Michael III Technical High School is a public school offering technology-related and general classes for students in 11th and 12th grades. The school building is located on a tract of land with several schools including South Hagerstown High School. This area lies near the southern city limits of Hagerstown, Washington County, Maryland, United States. The school opened in 1972 and is part of the Washington County Public Schools system. Its principal is Robert Stike.

Boyd J. Michael III Technical High School has 17 different career and technology programs for students to choose from. Each instructional program offers a current, relevant, industry-based curriculum.

Boyd J. Michael III Technical High School also offers a wide variety of academic classes.

Offsite from the main building, there is an alternate building called the Public Service Academy. That building serves as the school for the Criminal Justice Program, Homeland Security Program, and the Fire & Rescue Academy Program

The facility also houses Washington County's Evening High School which serves adults looking to earn a high school diploma. The school is a public high school located just inside the southern city limits of Hagerstown, Maryland, United States. The school is housed within a facility that also contains Washington County Technical High School. Evening High serves adult students who wish to complete their high school courses in order to receive high school diplomas. The school is part of Washington County Public Schools system.
