= Washington County Public Schools =

School district for Washington County, Maryland

Coordinates: 39°37′37″N 77°42′50″W

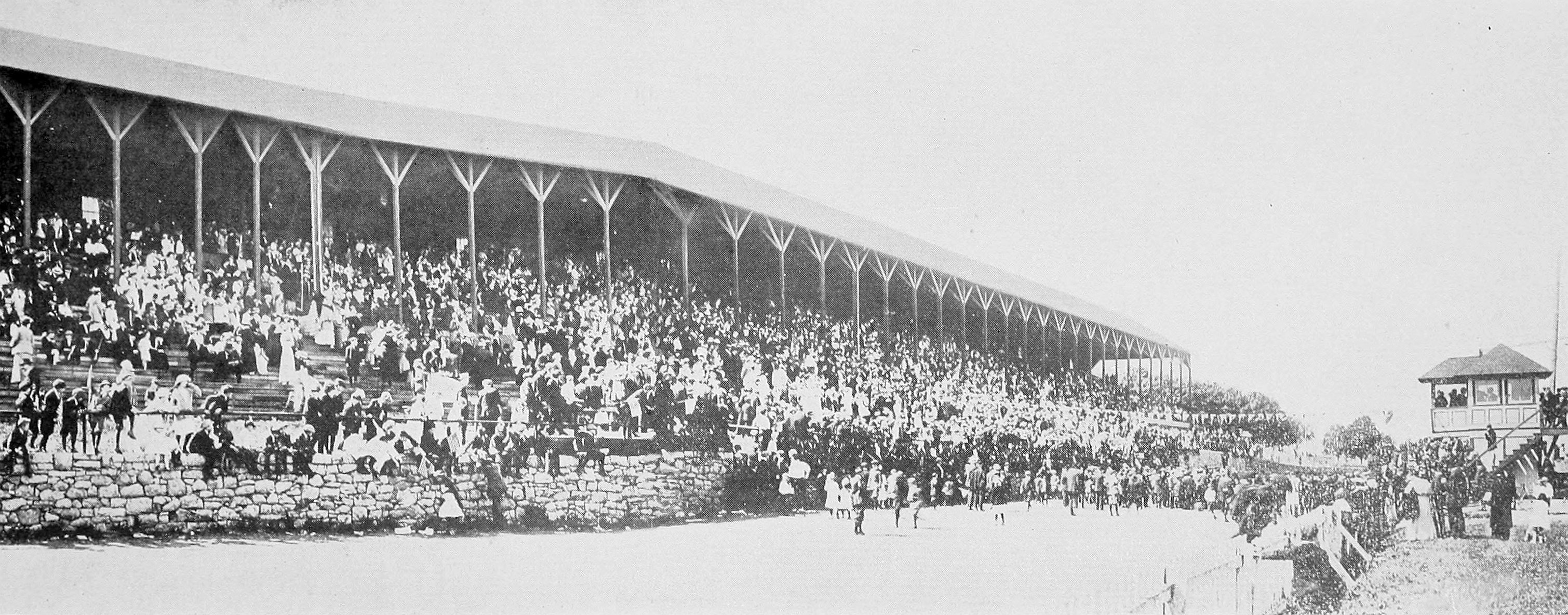
Washington County Public Schools track and field championships, 1916

Washington County Public Schools (WCPS) is a U.S. school system run for the residents of Washington County, Maryland. The central offices of WCPS are collectively known as the Washington County Board of Education, which is located on 10435 Downsville Pike in Hagerstown. The elected body responsible for budgeting consists of April Zentmeyer (President), Michael Guessford (Vice-President), Linda Murray, Victoria Beachley, Darrell Evans, Ashley McCusker, and Charles Burkett. On 1 July 2022, David T. Sovine began serving as superintendent of Washington County Public Schools.

== History ==
In 1956, the Washington County Public School system launched an experimental education program where students would receive lessons on a closed-circuit television network. The program was piloted in the city of Hagerstown's two high schools and six elementary schools. By 1958, the program had extended to all the schools in Washington County.

Educators have been represented by the Washington County Teachers Association, an affiliate of the Maryland State Education Association, since 1921.

Gary Willow became the superintendent in 2026.

== High schools ==
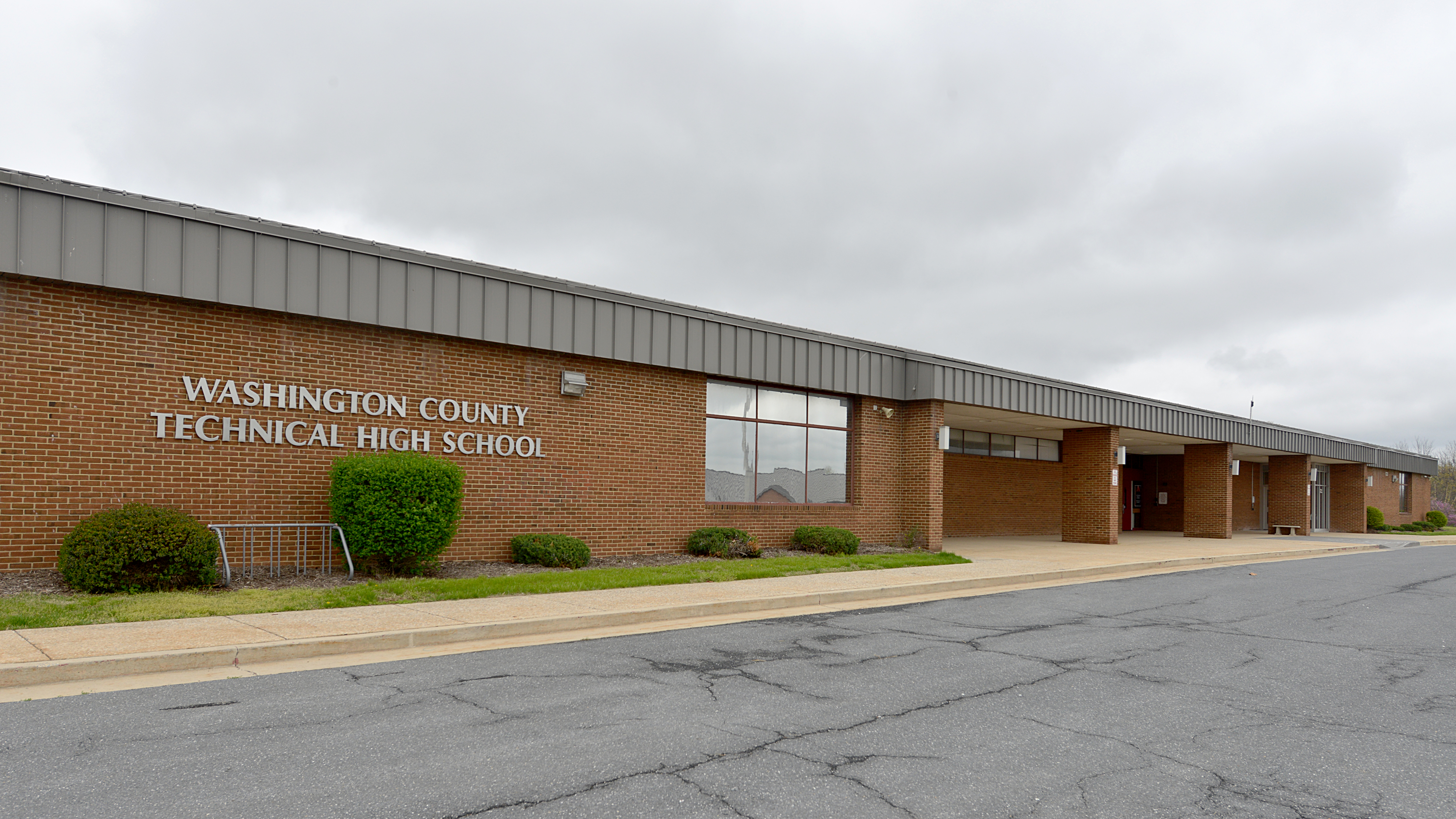
Washington County Technical High School in Hagerstown, Maryland

- Antietam Academy, Hagerstown
- Barbara Ingram School for the Arts, Hagerstown (magnet school)
- Boonsboro High School, Boonsboro
- Clear Spring High School, Clear Spring
- Evening High School, Hagerstown
- Hancock Middle-Senior High School, Hancock
- North Hagerstown High School, Hagerstown
- Smithsburg High School, Smithsburg
- South Hagerstown High School, Hagerstown
- Washington County Technical High School, Hagerstown
- Williamsport High School, Williamsport

== Middle schools ==
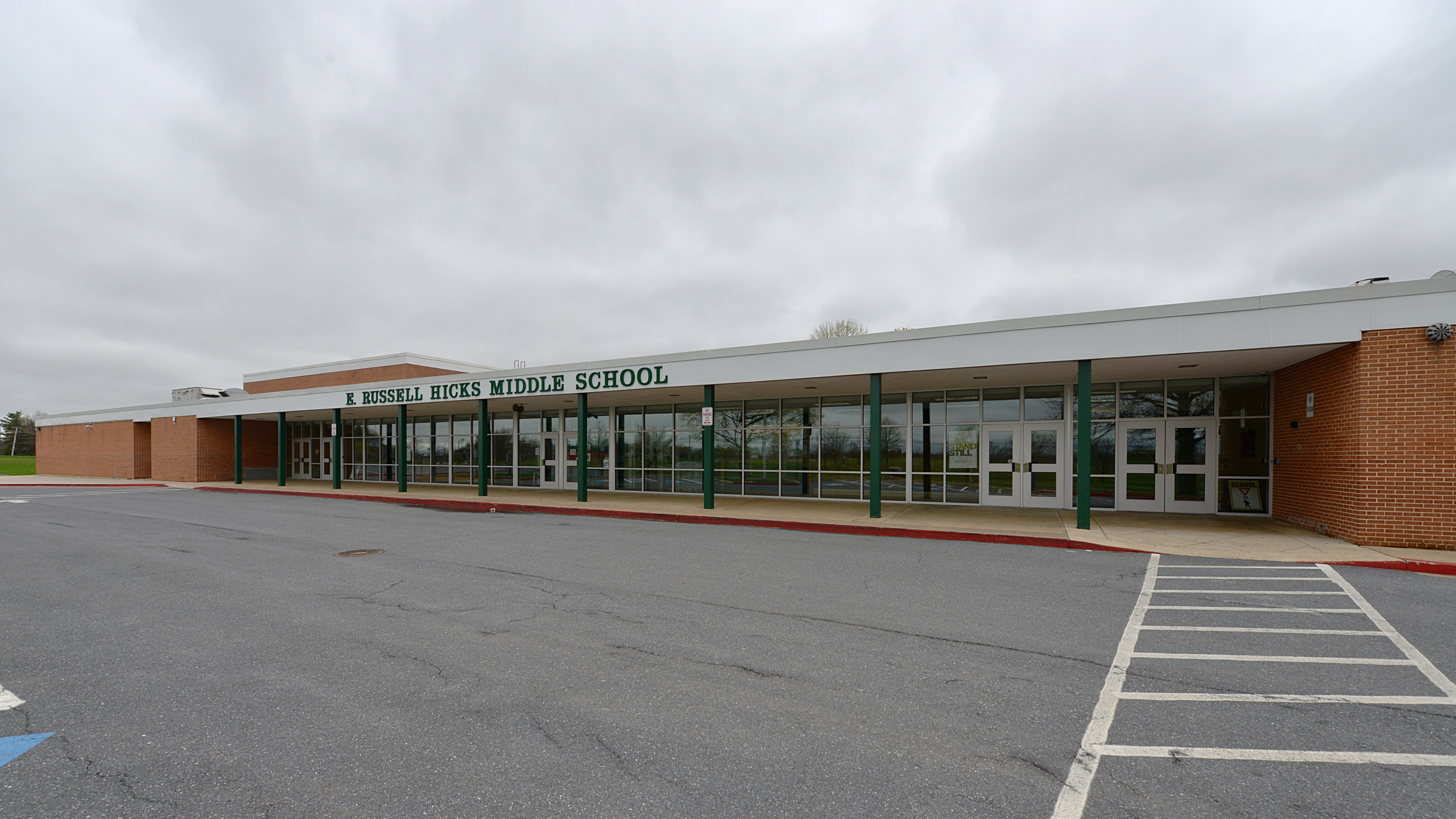
E. Russell Hicks Middle School in Hagerstown, Maryland

- Boonsboro Middle School, Boonsboro (magnet school)
- Clear Spring Middle School, Clear Spring
- E. Russell Hicks Middle School, Hagerstown (magnet school)
- Northern Middle School, Hagerstown (International Baccalaureate World School, Magnet School)
- Smithsburg Middle School, Smithsburg
- Springfield Middle School, Williamsport (magnet school)
- Western Heights Middle School, Hagerstown

== Elementary schools ==
- Bester Elementary School, Hagerstown
- Boonsboro Elementary School, Boonsboro (magnet school)
- Cascade Elementary School, Cascade
- Clear Spring Elementary School, Clear Spring
- Conococheague Elementary School, Hagerstown (Closed Down)
- Eastern Elementary School, Hagerstown
- Emma K. Doub School for Integrated Arts & Technology, Hagerstown (magnet school)
- Fountain Rock Elementary School, Hagerstown
- Fountaindale Elementary School, Hagerstown (magnet school)
- Funkstown School for Early Childhood Education, Hagerstown
- Greenbrier Elementary School, Boonsboro
- Hancock Elementary School, Hancock
- Hickory Elementary School, Williamsport
- Jonathan Hager Elementary School, Hagerstown
- Lincolnshire Elementary School, Hagerstown
- Maugansville Elementary School, Maugansville
- Old Forge Elementary School, Hagerstown
- Pangborn Elementary School, Hagerstown
- Paramount Elementary School, Hagerstown
- Pleasant Valley Elementary School, Knoxville
- Potomac Heights Elementary School, Hagerstown
- Rockland Woods Elementary School, Hagerstown
- Salem Avenue Elementary School, Hagerstown
- Sharpsburg Elementary School, Sharpsburg
- Smithsburg Elementary School, Smithsburg
- Williamsport Elementary School, Williamsport (magnet school)
- Winter Street Elementary School, Hagerstown (Closed)

== Other schools ==
- Claud Kitchens Outdoor School at Fairview, Clear Spring (camping trip mostly used for 5th grade)
- Marshall Street School, Hagerstown
- Robinwood Early Childhood Center, Hagerstown
- Washington County Job Development Program at Marshall Street School, Hagerstown

== See also ==
- List of high schools in Maryland
- Washington County Closed-Circuit Educational Television Project
