= Joseph Fiery House =

Historic house in Maryland, United States

- U.S. National Register of Historic Places
- Location within Maryland Location within the United States
- Location: 15107 Hicksville Road, Clear Spring, Maryland
- Coordinates: 39°42′7.5″N 77°50′48.6″W
- Area: 3 acres (1.2 ha)
- Built: 1760
- Architectural style: Germanic central-chimney
- NRHP reference No.: 02001588
- Added to NRHP: December 27, 2002

The Joseph Fiery House is a historic home located at Clear Spring, Washington County, Maryland, United States. It is a two-story, three-bay limestone Germanic central-chimney house, probably dating from the 1760s or 1770s, with a 1 1/2-story log addition. The house stands on a 3.01-acre (12,200 m^{2}) tract with a small cluster of outbuildings. An unusual feature of the house is the absence of any openings at all on the rear elevation. Also on the property is a limestone Swisser-style barn.

The Joseph Fiery House was listed on the National Register of Historic Places in 2002.
