= Antietam Academy =

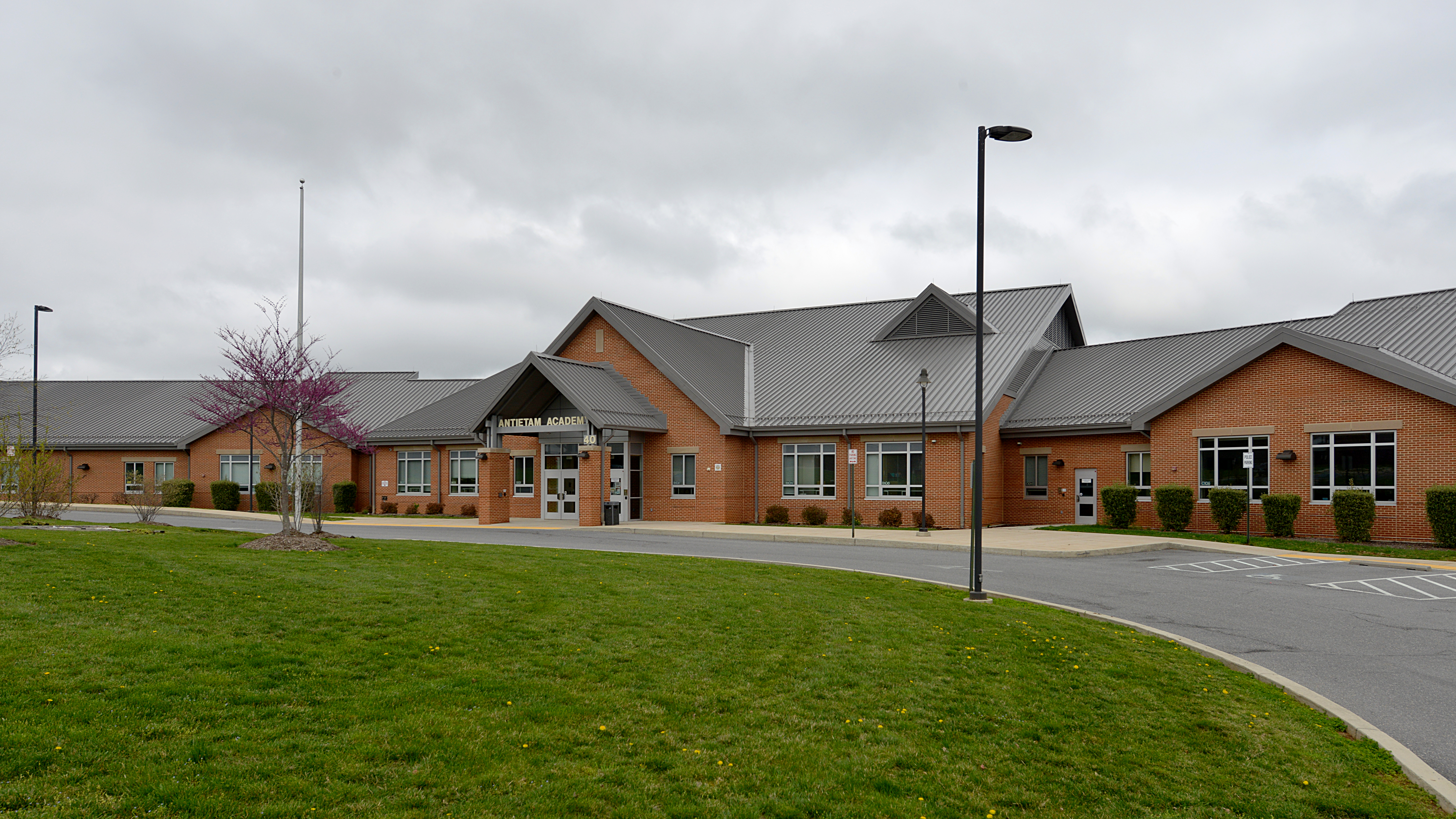

Location
- 40 West Oak Ridge Drive; Hagerstown, MD 21740; United States
- Coordinates: 39°36′52.7″N 77°44′5.8″W

Information
- Type: Public Middle School / High School
- Established: 2011
- School district: WCPS
- Assistant Principal, HS: Frank English
- Grades: 6–12
- Campus type: Suburban
- Website: Official website

Antietam Academy is a public high school and middle school in Hagerstown, Washington County, Maryland, United States. The school consists of an alternative program specializing in behavioral as well as academic disciplines for students in grades 6–12. It was formally renamed in 2003 after being known as the Alternative Center since its introduction in 1977. Up until 2011, its middle school and high school components were housed in two different locations, both in Hagerstown, Maryland. In January 2011, its new facility was opened in Hagerstown that is now home to both levels. After its opening the building, on 40 West Oak Ridge Drive, has become home to other educational programs, including Evening High School and a summer school program. The High School Assistant Principal is Frank English. The school is part of the Washington County Public Schools system. The High School Day is 8:45 to 3:30 and Middle School is 8:30 to 3:00.
