= Hancock Middle-Senior High School =

Public school in Maryland, United States

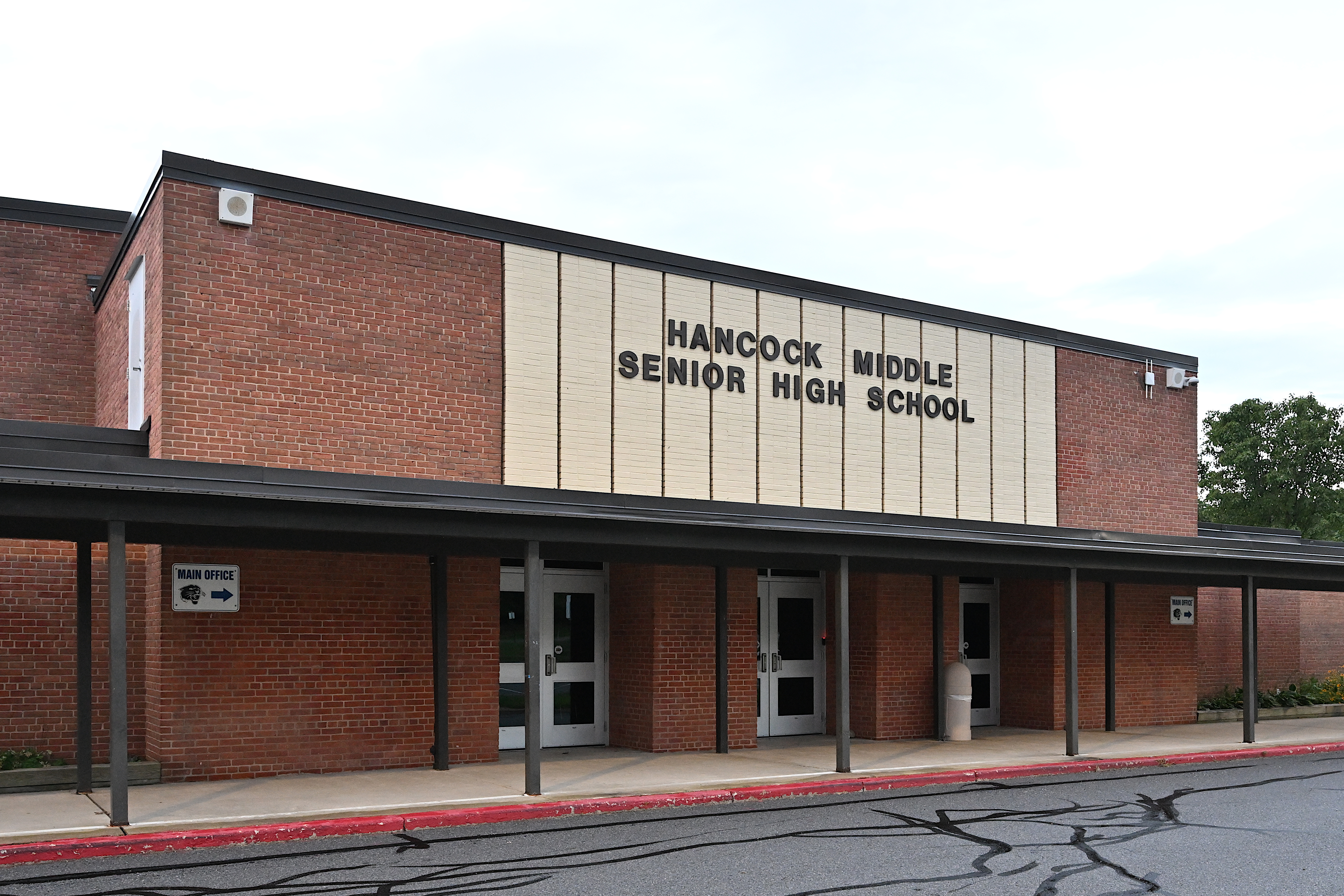

Location
- 289 W Main St; Hancock, Maryland 21750; United States; 39°41′50″N 78°11′48″W

Information
- Type: Public
- Established: 1956
- School district: Washington County Public Schools
- NCES District ID: 2400660
- CEEB code: 210625
- NCES School ID: 240066001270
- Principal: Jennifer Ruppenthal
- Grades: 6–12
- Enrollment: 262 (2016)
- Colors: Blue and White
- Sports: Volleyball, Football, Basketball, Baseball, Softball, and Bocce
- Mascot: Panther
- Website: hmshs.wcpsmd.com

Hancock Middle-Senior High School, also known as Hancock High, is a public middle/high school (grades 6 to 12) in Hancock, Washington County, Maryland, United States. Its principal is Jenny Ruppenthal. It enrolls 262 students as of 2016 and School Day is 8:30 to 3:30.

== Academic recognition ==
Hancock Middle-Senior High School was recently named in U.S. News & World Report's annual listing of the Best High Schools in the United States earning a Bronze Award for test scores consistently above state and national averages.

== Sports ==
Hancock Middle-Senior High School has 7 varsity athletic teams, they are:

=== Fall sports ===
- Football
- Volleyball

=== Winter sports ===
- Boys Basketball
- Girls Basketball
- Indoor Track

=== Spring sports ===
- Baseball
- Outdoor Track
- Softball

In 1933, the boys soccer team won the state championship; however, the school no longer has a boys soccer team.
