= Barbara Ingram School for the Arts =

Location
- 7 S. Potomac St; Hagerstown, MD 21740; United States; 39°38′30.1″N 77°43′14.9″W

Information
- School type: Magnet high school
- Opened: 2009
- Founder: Dr. Elizabeth M. Morgan
- School district: Washington County Public Schools
- Superintendent: Dr. Boyd Michael
- Principal: Doctor Chilcutt (I'm really sorry I don't know his first name please delete this right here if you can find his first name.)
- Grades: 9-12
- Enrollment: 300 (October 2017)
- Website: Official site

Barbara Ingram School for the Arts is a magnet high school that opened its doors for gifted art students in August 2009. Currently there are ten different majors: Theatre, Musical Theatre, Technical Theatre, Vocal Music, Instrumental Music, Dance, Creative Writing, Visual Arts, Computer Game Design and Animation, and Digital Communications. The Literary Arts program was added at the start of the 2011-2012 school year. The CGDA and Digital Communications were moved over from Washington County Technical High in the 2020-2021 year as they were no longer able to support the classes to the student class size needed. The school building is located adjacent to the Maryland Theatre in the arts and entertainment district of downtown Hagerstown, Washington County, Maryland, United States. Despite being a public school, applications and auditions are part of a process needed in order to be accepted and then enrolled. Barbara Ingram School is also unique in that it will accept students not only from all of Washington County but also from proximate Maryland counties and areas in nearby Pennsylvania and West Virginia. Rob Hovermale is the current principal. There are no sports teams originating from the school.

BISFA is named after the late Barbara Ingram, a Hagerstown native and former public school art teacher.

== Performances and exhibitions ==
=== All-school musicals ===
==== 2009–2010 ====
The first all-school musical was Thoroughly Modern Millie and received rave reviews.

==== 2010–2011 ====
The all-school musical The Phantom of the Opera was performed during the 2010 to 2011 school year. Barbara Ingram School for the Arts was one of the first high schools to perform this musical. Not only was the performance well received, it is also considered a milestone in the revival of downtown Hagerstown.

==== 2011–2012 ====
The 2012 all school musical was Disney's Beauty and The Beast and ran for two weekends at the Maryland Theatre.

==== 2012–2013 ====
The 2013 Barbara Ingram was Legally Blonde and received some of the highest praise for acting. It was the final musical for the first full graduating class.

==== 2013–2014 ====
In August 2013, Barbara Ingram announced that its fifth all-school musical will be the classic The Wizard of Oz. It was performed in April 2014.

==== 2014–2015 ====
In April 2015, Shrek the Musical was performed by students from all departments.

==== 2015–2016 ====
In April 2016, Barbara Ingram performed "The little Mermaid" as their 7th all school musical.

==== 2016–2017 ====
In April 2017, Barbara Ingram presented "Seussical" at the Maryland Theater as their 8th musical.

==== 2017–2018 ====
In April 2018, Barbara Ingram presented “Hairspray” at the Maryland Theater as their 9th musical.

==== 2018–2019 ====
In April 2019, Barbara Ingram presented "Mamma Mia!" at the Maryland Theater as their 10th musical.

==== 2019–2020 ====
While in preparation for "The Addams Family" set for April 2020, the onset of the SARS-CoV-2 Pandemic had inevitably caused production to halt and was never performed.

==== 2021–2022 ====
In April 2022, Barbara Ingram presented "Something Rotten" at the Maryland Theater as their 11th musical.

==== 2022–2023 ====
In April 2023, Barbara Ingram presented "SpongeBob SquarePants" at the Maryland Theater as their 12th musical.

==== 2023-2024 ====
In April 2024, Barbara Ingram presented "The Addams Family" at the Maryland Theatre as their 13th musical.

2024-2025

In April 2025, Barbara Ingram presented "Once Upon a Mattress" at the Maryland Theatre as their 14th musical.

2025-2026

In April 2026, Barbara Ingram presented "Hadestown: Teen Edition" at the Maryland Theatre as their 15th musical.

=== Additional performances ===
In the summer of 2010 thirty-seven vocalists traveled to New York City to perform in Eric Whitacre's Paradise Lost: Shadows and Wings at Carnegie Hall. The dance department has also traveled to perform at the Orange Bowl. In 2010, the choral ensemble had the opportunity to sing as the backup choir for Todd Rundgren's fall tour. The Barbara Ingram Music Theatre Ensemble, the "Phantasmics", performed at Downtown Disney in Orlando Florida in the summer of 2011 and in Disney and Universal theme parks in 2012. There are many performances year-round at the school, including the yearly Holiday Spectacular, in which all disciplines participate. Performances have occurred in The Maryland Theatre, in the downstairs "Black Box" of the main building, and at other locations around the community.

== Mascot ==
The Barbara Ingram school mascot is 'The Phantom,' alluding to the alleged ghost that haunts the lower level of the building and the adjacent Maryland Theater; the mascot is also a reference to their production of "The Phantom of the Opera" in 2011. The school colors are purple, black and silver.
