= Wilson-Conococheague, Maryland =

- CDP
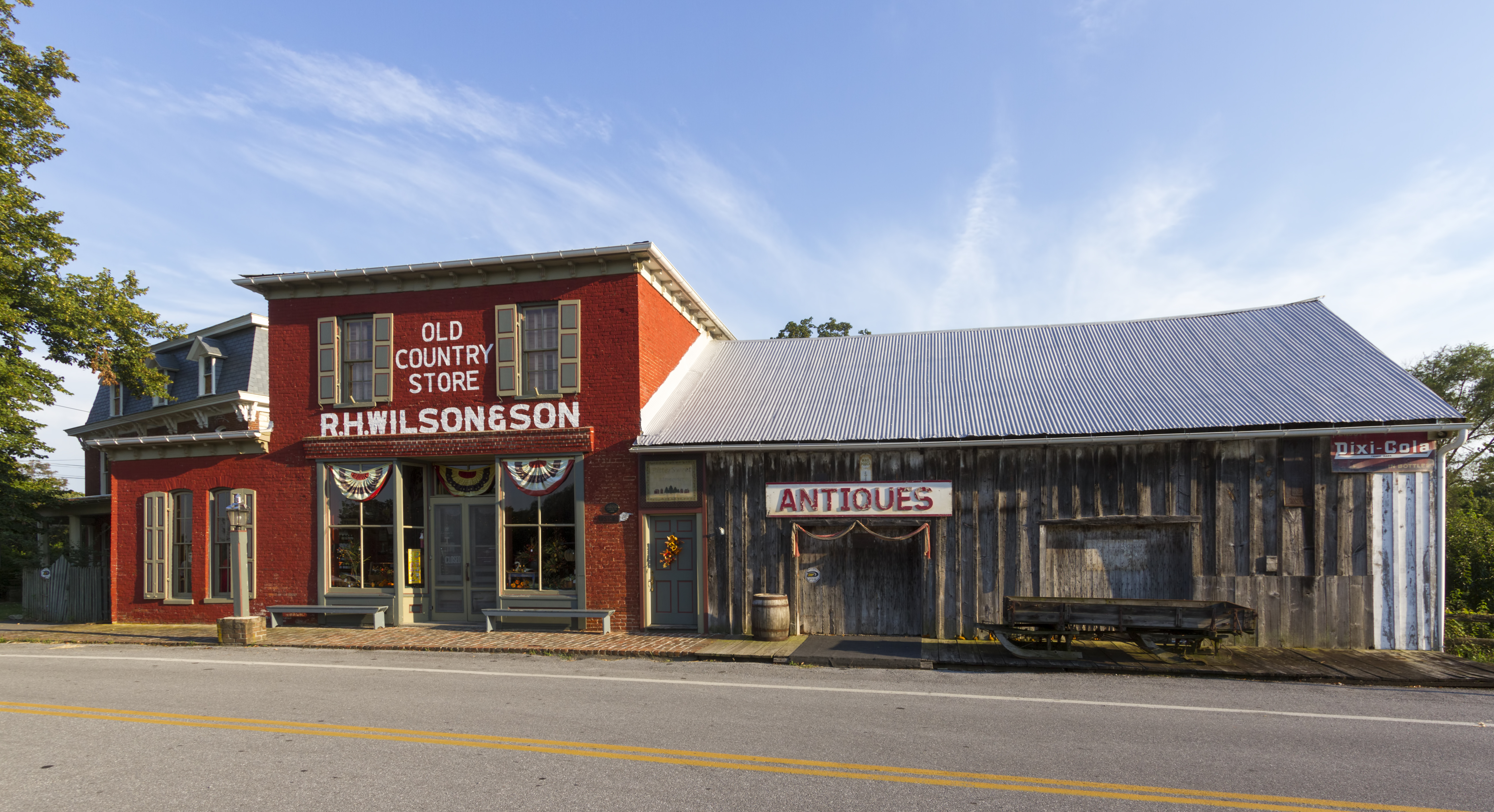
- Rufus Wilson Complex in the community

- Location of Wilson-Conococheague, Maryland
- Coordinates: 39°39′11″N 77°49′50″W
- Country: United States
- State: Maryland
- County: Washington

Area
  - Total: 4.85 sq mi (12.55 km^{2})
  - Land: 4.72 sq mi (12.22 km^{2})
  - Water: 0.12 sq mi (0.32 km^{2})
- Elevation: 440 ft (130 m)

Population (2020)
  - Total: 2,262
  - Density: 479.4/sq mi (185.09/km^{2})
- Time zone: UTC−5 (Eastern (EST))
  - Summer (DST): UTC−4 (EDT)
- FIPS code: 24-85395
- GNIS feature ID: 2390522

Wilson-Conococheague is a census-designated place (CDP) in Washington County, Maryland, United States. The population was 2,262 at the 2020 census.

== Geography ==
According to the United States Census Bureau, the CDP has a total area of 5.00 square miles (12.9 km^{2}), of which 4.90 square miles (12.7 km^{2}) is land and 0.10 square miles (0.26 km^{2}) is water.

== Demographics ==
Historical population
Census	Pop.	Note	%±
2020	2,262		—
U.S. Decennial Census

=== 2020 census ===
As of the 2020 census, Wilson-Conococheague had a population of 2,262. The median age was 43.4 years. 21.5% of residents were under the age of 18 and 17.6% of residents were 65 years of age or older. For every 100 females there were 110.0 males, and for every 100 females age 18 and over there were 107.2 males age 18 and over.

52.0% of residents lived in urban areas, while 48.0% lived in rural areas.

There were 868 households in Wilson-Conococheague, of which 30.8% had children under the age of 18 living in them. Of all households, 49.1% were married-couple households, 17.1% were households with a male householder and no spouse or partner present, and 26.7% were households with a female householder and no spouse or partner present. About 24.3% of all households were made up of individuals and 13.8% had someone living alone who was 65 years of age or older.

There were 927 housing units, of which 6.4% were vacant. The homeowner vacancy rate was 1.4% and the rental vacancy rate was 2.9%.

Racial composition as of the 2020 census
Race	Number	Percent
White	1,925	85.1%
Black or African American	64	2.8%
American Indian and Alaska Native	13	0.6%
Asian	10	0.4%
Native Hawaiian and Other Pacific Islander	1	0.0%
Some other race	72	3.2%
Two or more races	177	7.8%
Hispanic or Latino (of any race)	160	7.1%

=== 2000 census ===
As of the 2000 census, there were 1,885 people, 718 households and 549 families living in the CDP. The population density was 387.3 per square mile (149.5/km^{2}). There were 752 housing units at an average density of 154.5 per square mile (59.7/km^{2}). The racial make-up of the CDP was 97.82% White, 1.06% African American, 0.05% Native American, 0.42% Asian, 0.21% from other races and 0.42% from two or more races. Hispanic or Latino of any race were 0.58% of the population.

There were 718 households, of which 35.9% had children under the age of 18 living with them, 63.0% were married couples living together, 9.5% had a female householder with no husband present and 23.5% were non-families. 18.4% of all households were made up of individuals and 8.6% had someone living alone who was 65 years of age or older. The average household size was 2.63 and the average family size was 2.98.

25.9% of the population were under the age of 18, 6.0% from 18 to 24, 32.6% from 25 to 44, 22.9% from 45 to 64 and 12.6% were 65 years of age or older. The median age was 36 years. For every 100 females, there were 97.6 males. For every 100 females age 18 and over, there were 93.8 males.

The median household income was $38,389 and the median family income was $39,256. Males had a median income of $31,505 and females $21,250. The per capita income was $15,951. About 5.6% of families and 7.4% of the population were below the poverty line, including 2.9% of those under age 18 and 15.6% of those age 65 or over.
