= Rufus Wilson Complex =

Historic house in Maryland, United States

- U.S. National Register of Historic Places
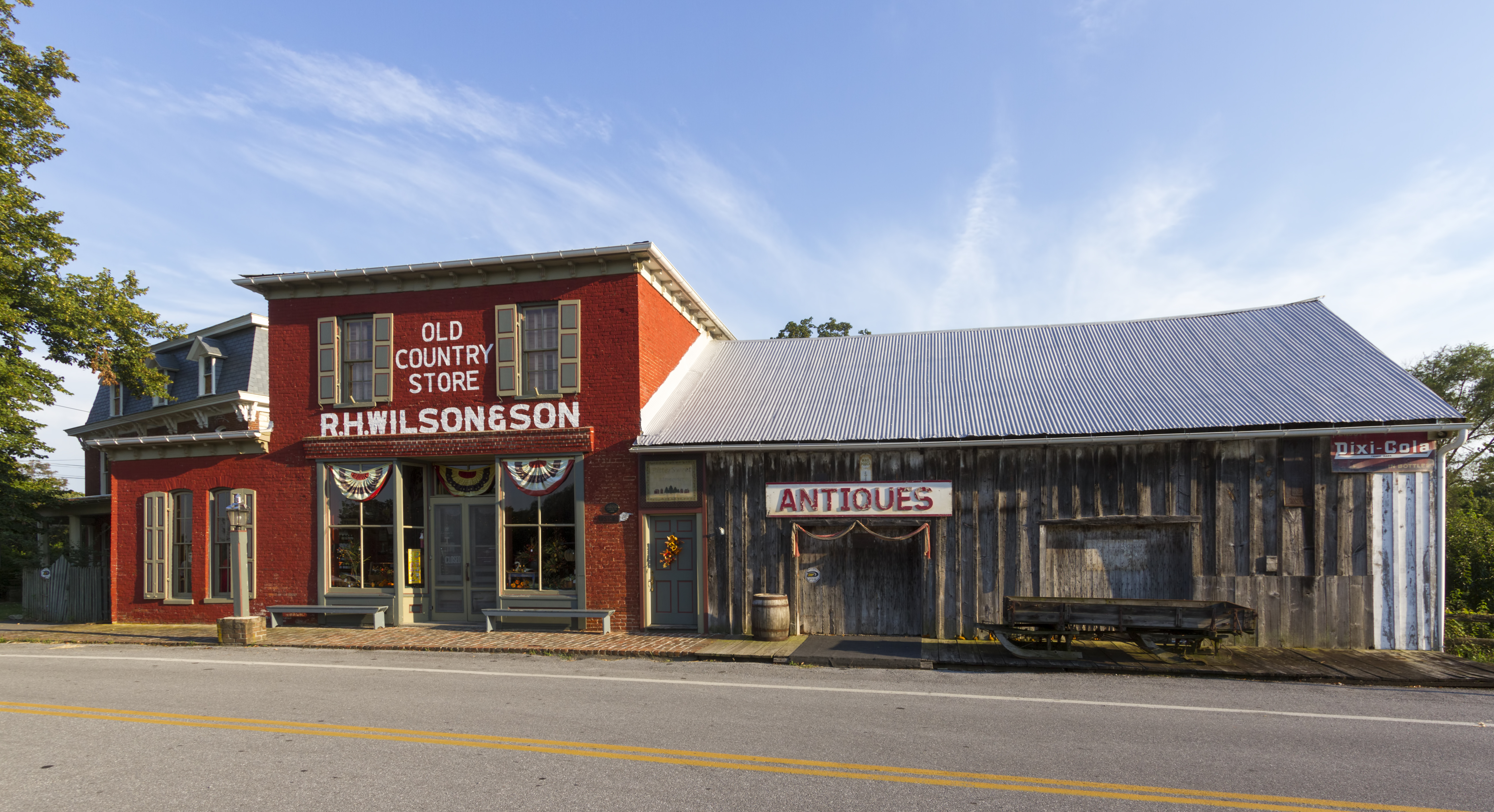

- Location within Maryland Location within the United States
- Location: 14293 Rufus Wilson Rd., Clear Spring, Maryland
- Coordinates: 39°39′22″N 77°51′6″W
- Area: 3.1 acres (1.3 ha)
- Built: 1850
- Architectural style: Second Empire
- NRHP reference No.: 96001416
- Added to NRHP: December 6, 1996

Rufus Wilson Complex is a group of historic buildings located at Clear Spring, Washington County, Maryland, United States. The property includes a complex of mid-late 19th-century buildings which create the center of a small rural settlement named Conococheague located on the National Road. The main house is a large brick dwelling with a mansard roof. This house incorporates a 2 1/2-story limestone dwelling built about 1850 by Rufus Wilson, which was enlarged to its present Second Empire style in the last quarter of the 19th century. Adjacent to the house is a brick post office and store, built about 1880 by Wilson, with an attached feed room of frame construction with weatherboard siding. A carriage house built about 1882 is located immediately behind the store and a bank barn and grazing area are located at the rear of these buildings. Also on the property is a small frame corn crib.

It was listed on the National Register of Historic Places in 1996.
