= Appletown, Maryland =

Unincorporated community in Maryland, United States

- Unincorporated community
- Location within Maryland
- Coordinates: 39°28′50″N 77°38′51″W
- Country: United States
- State: Maryland
- County: Washington
- Elevation: 581 ft (177 m)
- Time zone: UTC−5 (Eastern (EST))
  - Summer (DST): UTC−4 (EDT)
- Area codes: 301 & 240
- GNIS feature ID: 588522

Appletown is an unincorporated community in Washington County, Maryland, United States. Appletown is located along Maryland Route 67, 1.8 miles (2.9 km) south of Boonsboro.
