= Plumb Grove =

Historic house in Maryland, United States

- U.S. National Register of Historic Places
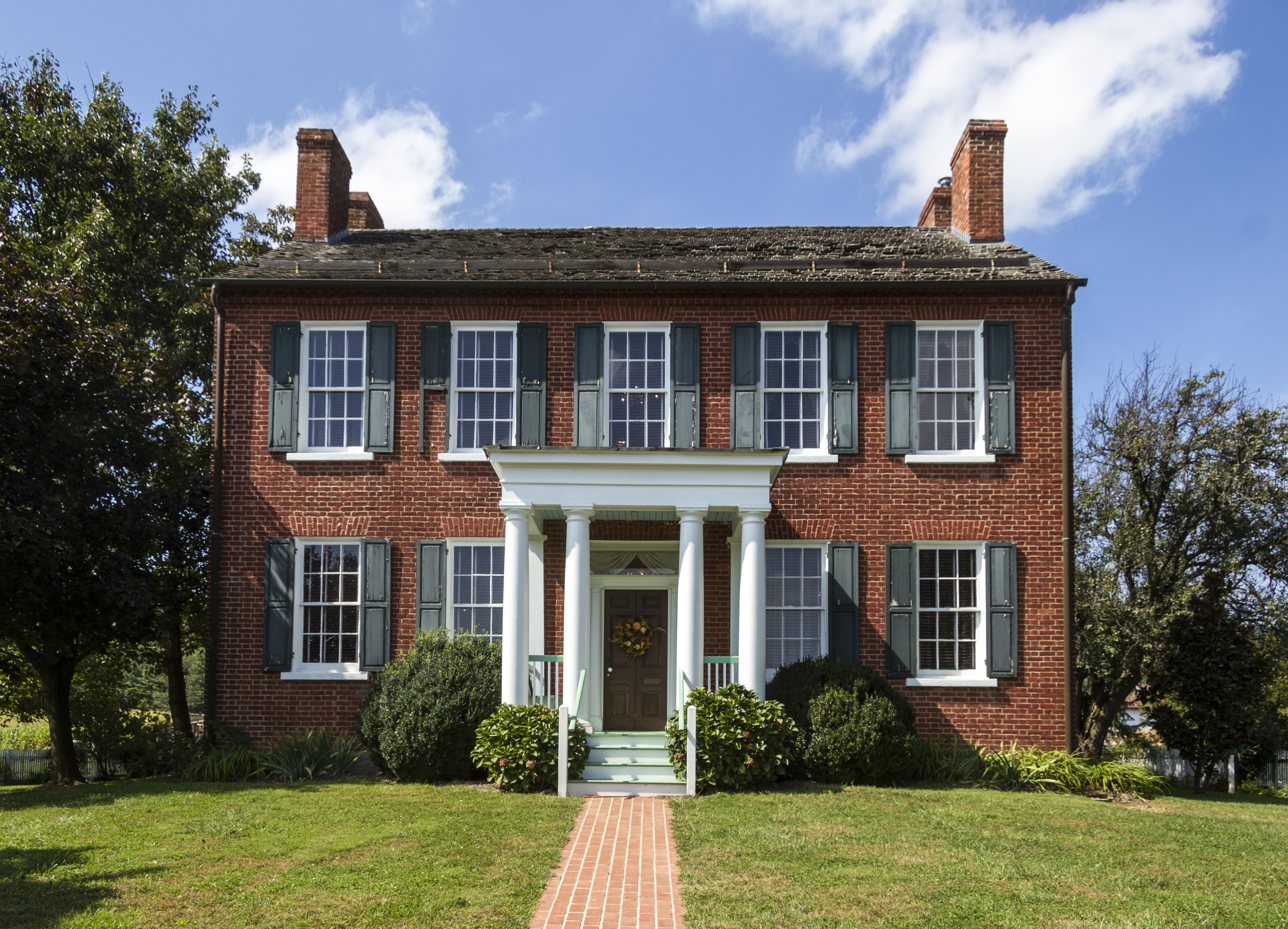

- Location within Maryland Location within the United States
- Nearest city: Clear Spring, Maryland
- Coordinates: 39°39′7″N 77°48′53″W
- Built: 1832
- NRHP reference No.: 11000882
- Added to NRHP: December 7, 2011

Plumb Grove, also known as the Nesbitt-Warner House, is a historic house and farm near Clear Spring, Maryland. The house was built about 1832 in the Federal style on a property called "Nesbitt's Inheritance." The lands and house remained in the Nesbitt family until 1893, when they were sold to Rosa E. Warner. The Warner family occupied the house until 1967, when the property was purchased by the Washington County Board of Education as the site for Clear Spring Middle and High Schools.

Plumb Grove was placed on the National Register of Historic Places on December 7, 2011. It is owned by the Clear Spring District Historical Association. It has been restored and is open to the public.
