= Washington County Closed-Circuit Educational Television Project =

Closed-circuit television network in aiding elementary school teaching

Washington County Closed-Circuit Educational Television Project demonstrated

The Washington County Closed-Circuit Educational Television Project was the first closed-circuit television network in aiding elementary school teaching by the use of television. The project took place in Washington County, Maryland, and started in September 1956.

== History ==
The person in charge of the project was William M. Brish, who was the Superintendent of Schools for Washington County. The motivation for the project was that the county school system did not have enough teachers with sufficient training. Two large institutions, the Ford Foundation's Fund for the Advancement of Education and the Electronic Industries Association, sponsored the project and gave almost $1,500,000 (equivalent to $16,000,000 in 2024) during the course of the project. This included $200,000 per year given by the Fund and the donation of $300,000 worth of equipment from a number of manufacturers via the Association. The project was distinct from other early efforts at educational television that relied upon broadcast stations.

The project had national visibility; The Austin American newspaper in Texas referred to it as a "pioneering" effort. Several reports on the project, during and after its duration, were prepared for the Society of Motion Picture and Television Engineers and presented in that society's journals and at its conferences.

The first year of the project saw eight elementary schools, with some 6,000 students, using the television system. Then during the second year, seven more were added. From its first year in use, Brish considered the project a success; however, he emphasized that it was not a replacement of traditional methods, telling a teachers' conference that "Television is not a teaching process. It does not replace the teacher or the book."

The project that had started in 1956 progressed to provide simultaneous telecasting to some 19,000 elementary students in the 45 county schools by 1962. As described by a member of the Board of Education of Washington County as part of a series on education television published in 1962 by the Bangor Daily News in Maine (where a debate on the merits of educational television was taking place), the television production facilities that the county used were the equal of those possessed by many commercial television stations.

There were about twenty-five school lessons broadcast daily through the private closed-circuit network. A large variety of subjects were taught over television, from remedial reading and arithmetic to art and music to advanced mathematics, biology, and chemistry. The teachers who gave the presentations in the television studio were drawn from the full set of classroom teachers in the county, and they coordinated instruction with what would be going on in the classroom.

== Equipment ==
The initial system served eight elementary schools with 6,000 total students. There were forty-five public schools in Washington County altogether, and by the time the project concluded in 1961, all of them were connected to the closed-circuit system. The people who ran the technical aspects of the telecasts and operated the television cameras were generally students from local junior colleges.

== Demise ==
Use of educational television continued on even after the initial six-year period of the project was concluded. Subsequently, the county changed its way of doing audiovisual education, by switching from a closed-circuit cable system to the use of video tape recordings that would be shown in every participating school.

== Bibliography ==
- Kane, Joseph Nathan (1997). Famous First Facts (Fifth ed.). New York: The H.W. Wilson Company. ISBN 0-8242-0930-3.
- Saettler, Paul (1990). The Evolution of American Educational Technology. Englewood, Colorado: Libraries Unlimited. ISBN 0-87287-613-6.
- Schramm, Wilbur (1989). "Audiovisual Education". In Barnouw, Erik (ed.). International Encyclopedia of Communications. Vol. 1. New York: Oxford University Press. pp. 153–155. OCLC 632496016.
