= Clear Spring, Maryland =

- Town
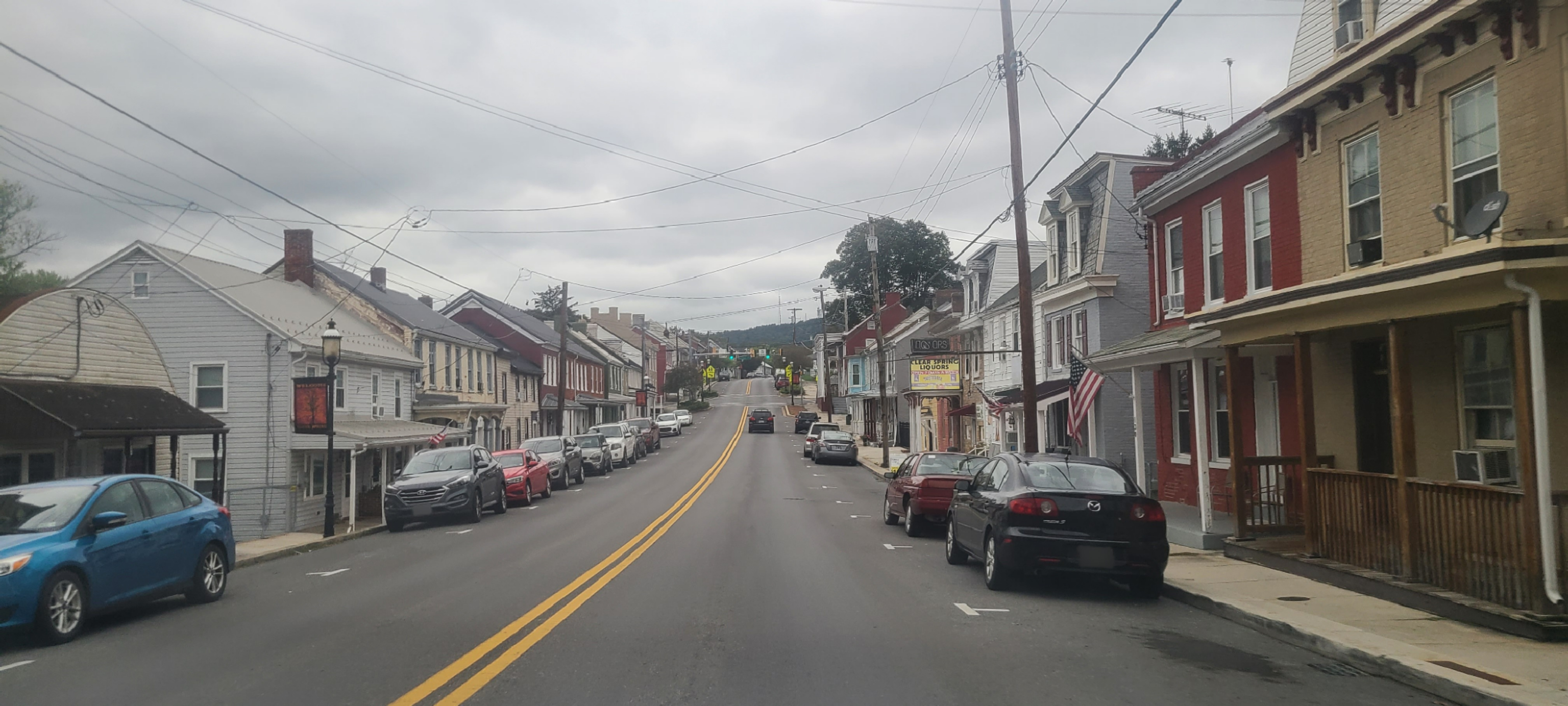
- Cumberland Street looking west in Clear Spring in 2023

- Seal

- Location of Clear Spring, Maryland
- Coordinates: 39°39′22″N 77°55′49″W
- Country: United States
- State: Maryland
- County: Washington
- Incorporated: 1836

Area
  - Total: 0.12 sq mi (0.30 km^{2})
  - Land: 0.12 sq mi (0.30 km^{2})
  - Water: 0 sq mi (0.00 km^{2})
- Elevation: 545 ft (166 m)

Population (2020)
  - Total: 372
  - Density: 3,238.5/sq mi (1,250.41/km^{2})
- Time zone: UTC-5 (Eastern (EST))
  - Summer (DST): UTC-4 (EDT)
- ZIP code: 21722
- Area codes: 301, 240
- FIPS code: 24-17600
- GNIS feature ID: 2390800
- Website: www.clearspringmd.gov

Clear Spring is a town in Washington County, Maryland, United States. As of the 2020 census, Clear Spring had a population of 372.

== History ==
The Joseph Fiery House, Wilson School, Rufus Wilson Complex, and Plumb Grove are listed on the National Register of Historic Places. Added to this, George Washington was once in Clear Spring.

== Geography ==
According to the United States Census Bureau, the town has a total area of 0.11 square miles (0.28 km^{2}), all land.

The town is situated at the eastern base of Fairview Mountain. The area is underlain by Conococheague limestone. The spring after which the town is named is the only local source of ground water, from which the local run, Tom's Run, receives its volume.

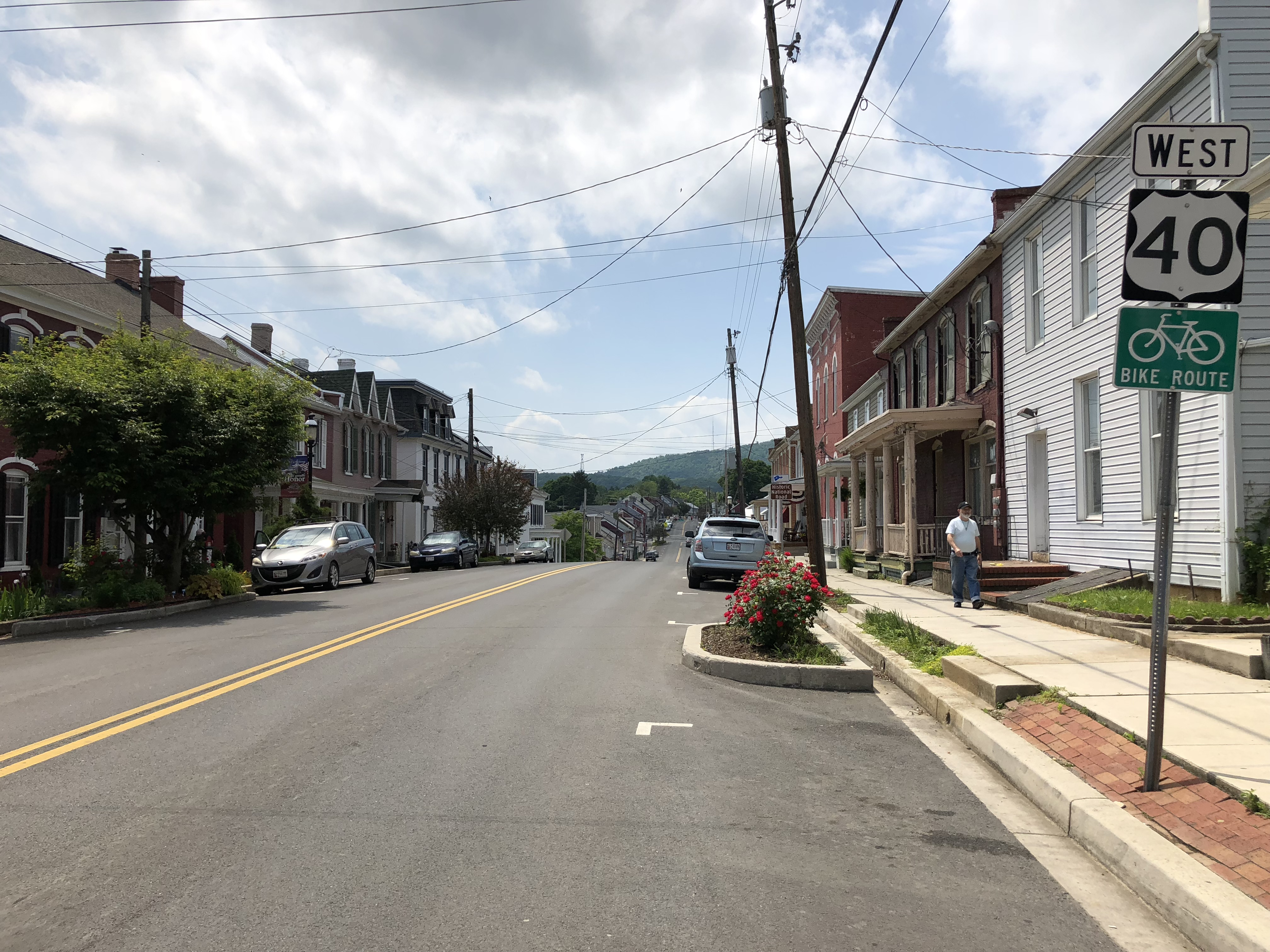
US 40 westbound through central Clear Spring

== Transportation ==
The primary means of travel to and from Clear Spring are by road. U.S. Route 40 is the main highway directly serving the town, serving as the town's main street. US 40 continues westward towards Hancock and eastward to Hagerstown. Maryland Route 68 is the other state highway serving the town. MD 68 reaches its western terminus at US 40 in Clear Spring, and heads eastward towards Williamsport. MD 68 also has an interchange with Interstate 70, the primary long-distance highway serving the region around Clear Spring, just south of the town limits. I-70 heads east to Baltimore and west to the southern suburbs of Pittsburgh.

== Demographics ==
Historical population
Census	Pop.	Note	%±
1870	702		—
1880	721		2.7%
1900	474		—
1910	521		9.9%
1920	538		3.3%
1930	539		0.2%
1940	500		−7.2%
1950	558		11.6%
1960	488		−12.5%
1970	499		2.3%
1980	477		−4.4%
1990	415		−13.0%
2000	455		9.6%
2010	358		−21.3%
2020	372		3.9%
U.S. Decennial Census

=== 2010 census ===
As of the census of 2010, there were 358 people, 157 households, and 88 families living in the town. The population density was 3,254.5 inhabitants per square mile (1,256.6/km^{2}). There were 189 housing units at an average density of 1,718.2 per square mile (663.4/km^{2}). The racial makeup of the town was 98.3% White, 0.3% African American, 0.3% Native American, 0.3% Asian, and 0.8% from two or more races. Hispanic or Latino of any race were 0.6% of the population.

There were 157 households, of which 30.6% had children under the age of 18 living with them, 34.4% were married couples living together, 16.6% had a female householder with no husband present, 5.1% had a male householder with no wife present, and 43.9% were non-families. 37.6% of all households were made up of individuals, and 13.3% had someone living alone who was 65 years of age or older. The average household size was 2.28 and the average family size was 3.02.

The median age in the town was 42.3 years. 19.8% of residents were under the age of 18; 10.1% were between the ages of 18 and 24; 26.9% were from 25 to 44; 27.9% were from 45 to 64; and 15.4% were 65 years of age or older. The gender makeup of the town was 48.0% male and 52.0% female.

=== 2000 census ===
As of the census of 2000, there were 455 people, 195 households, and 124 families living in the town. The population density was 4,214.2 inhabitants per square mile (1,627.1/km^{2}). There were 210 housing units at an average density of 1,945.0 per square mile (751.0/km^{2}). The racial makeup of the town was 98.02% White, 0.88% Asian, and 1.10% from two or more races.

There were 195 households, out of which 32.3% had children under the age of 18 living with them, 44.6% were married couples living together, 14.4% had a female householder with no husband present, and 36.4% were non-families. 28.2% of all households were made up of individuals, and 12.8% had someone living alone who was 65 years of age or older. The average household size was 2.33 and the average family size was 2.85.

In the town, the population was spread out, with 25.7% under the age of 18, 9.0% from 18 to 24, 32.3% from 25 to 44, 18.7% from 45 to 64, and 14.3% who were 65 years of age or older. The median age was 33 years. For every 100 females, there were 97.0 males. For every 100 females age 18 and over, there were 91.0 males.

The median income for a household in the town was $38,056, and the median income for a family was $38,750. Males had a median income of $32,411 versus $24,688 for females. The per capita income for the town was $17,774. About 9.1% of families and 12.6% of the population were below the poverty line, including 23.4% of those under age 18 and 1.4% of those age 65 or over.

== Education ==
Clear Spring is the home of Clear Spring High School with a student population of 415, which hosts the home field of the Blazers. Clear Spring High School houses Washington County Public Schools' Academy of Agricultural and Environmental Science, a program available to any student enrolled in Washington County Public Schools regardless of their home district.
