= South Hagerstown High School =

Coordinates: 39°37′14″N 77°43′57″W

- 1101 South Potomac Street; Hagerstown, MD 21740; United States

Information
- Motto: "Fama Semper Vivat" (Latin for May her fame forever live)
- Opened: 1956
- School district: Washington County Public Schools
- Principal: Amanda Mulledy
- Grades: 9–12
- Enrollment: 1,487 (2022–23)
- Campus size: 167,000 sq. ft.
- Campus type: Urban
- Colors: Kelly Green and White
- Team name: Rebels
- Website: shhs.wcpsmd.com

South Hagerstown High School is located at 1101 South Potomac Street, in Hagerstown, Maryland, United States. The current principal is Rodney Gayman. The 164,000 square-foot school is part of the Washington County Public Schools system and has an official capacity of 1,240.

== Background ==
South Hagerstown High School opened its doors in the fall of 1956. The many buildings of South High were planned by Washington, D.C. architects McLeod & Ferrara, and they were built by Norman S. Early and Son of Hagerstown. The architectural design of the school won first place in a national competition that year. The school was dedicated to the service of youth and the community.

The South Hagerstown Indoor Percussion won the 2015 KIDA (Keystone Indoor Drill Association) Championship. This is the 5th time in 33 years and is the first win since 2000.

== Organizations ==
- Student Government Association
- National Honor Society
- Academic Team
- Best Buddies
- PTSA
- Environmental Club
- Robotics Club
- Link Crew
- Spanish National Honor Society
- French Club
- Indoor and Outdoor Color Guard
- Marching Band
- Concert Band
- Anime Club
- Media Club
- Yearbook

== Sports ==
South Hagerstown High School sports teams have won 4 state championships. They have won two in baseball (1996 and 2003), one in basketball (1974), and one in boys outdoor track and field (2018).

== Robotics Team ==
The South Hagerstown High School Robotics team began the 2012–2013 school year. It is one of the largest teams in the nation and the school hosts several competitions each year. The Rebel Robotics team has qualified for the worlds competition in 7 of 8 years since the 2015-2016 season (only not qualifying in the 2018-2019 season). During the 2017–2018 season, one of the teams was ranked 19th in the world at one point. During the 2022–2023 season, several teams qualified for worlds, with one team (9080S – "Rebellious Misfits") winning the states competition; the first South High team to do so.

== Notable alumni ==
- Robert A. McKee, former Maryland politician, House of Delegates (District 2A)
- Christopher B. Shank, former Maryland state senator (District 2)
- Justin Warner, chef
- Lucas and Marcus Dobre, identical twin YouTube stars originally gaining fame from the 6-second video app, Vine
