= Washington County, Maryland =

County in Maryland, United States

- County
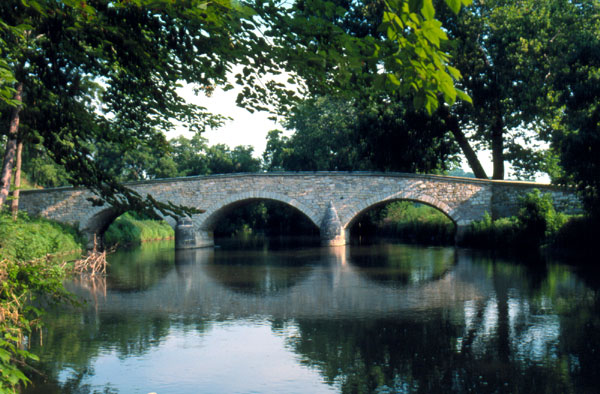
- Burnside's Bridge in Washington County, site of heavy combat during the Battle of Antietam

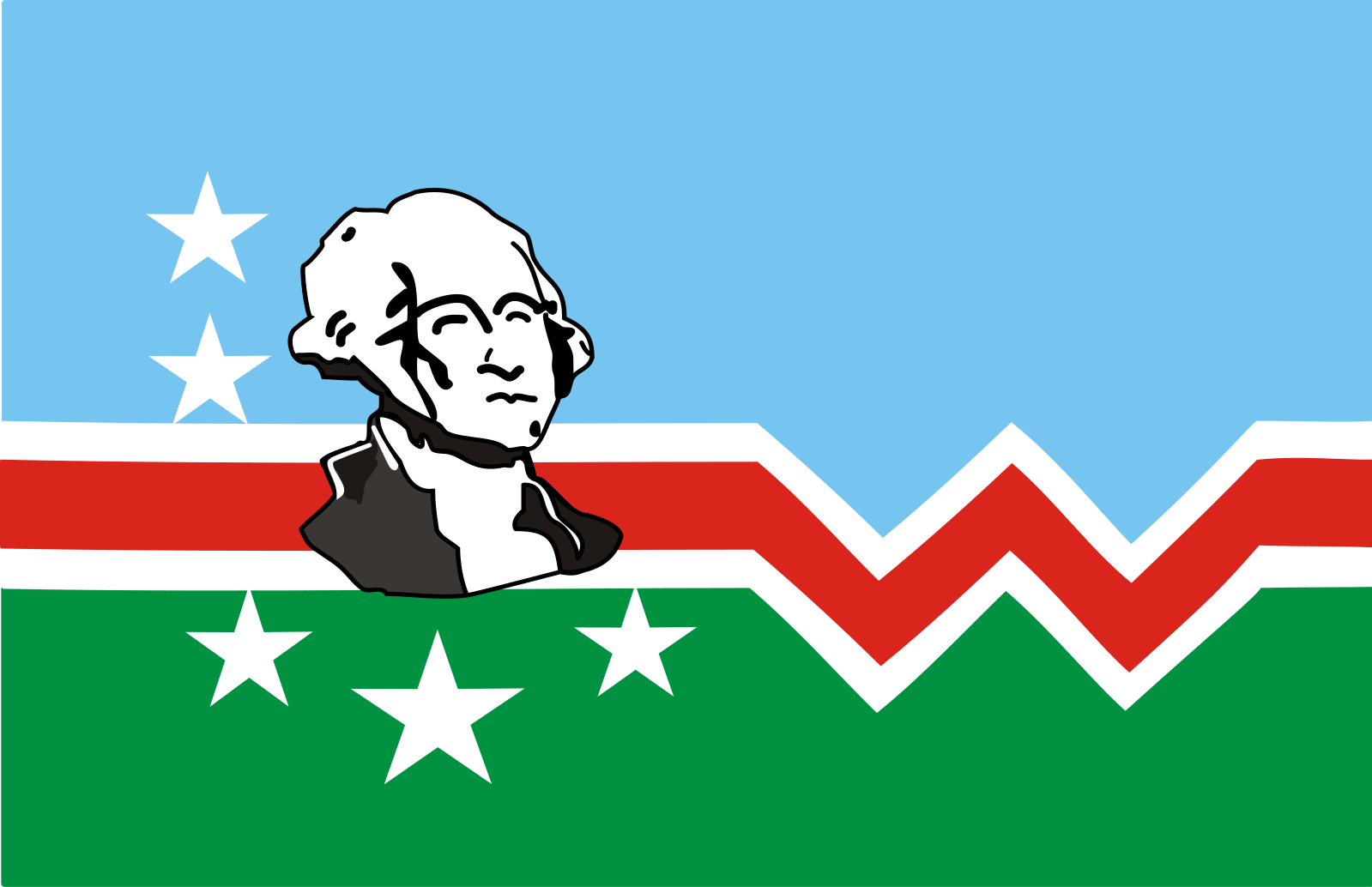
- Flag Seal

- Location within the U.S. state of Maryland
- Coordinates: 39°36′N 77°49′W
- Country: United States
- State: Maryland
- Founded: September 6, 1776
- Named for: George Washington
- Seat: Hagerstown
- Largest city: Hagerstown

Area
  - Total: 467 sq mi (1,210 km^{2})
  - Land: 458 sq mi (1,190 km^{2})
  - Water: 9.6 sq mi (25 km^{2}) 2.0%

Population (2020)
  - Total: 154,705
  - Estimate (2025): 157,731 ▲
  - Density: 338/sq mi (130/km^{2})
- Time zone: UTC−5 (Eastern)
  - Summer (DST): UTC−4 (EDT)
- Congressional district: 6th
- Website: www.washco-md.net

Washington County is located in the U.S. state of Maryland. The population was 154,705 as of the 2020 census. Its county seat and largest city is Hagerstown. The county is part of the Western Maryland region of the state.

Washington County was the first county in the United States to be named for the Revolutionary War general (and later President) George Washington. Washington County is one of three Maryland counties recognized by the Appalachian Regional Commission as being part of Appalachia. The county borders southern Pennsylvania to the north, Northern Virginia to the south, and the Martinsburg Panhandle of West Virginia to the south and west. Washington County is included in the Hagerstown metropolitan area, which is also included in the Washington metropolitan area.

== History ==
For thousands of years, Native Americans inhabited the lands that would later form Washington County. Archaeological evidence suggests that an Iroquoian people known as the Susquehannock occupied this region around 1600. In the early 17th century, England began to settle lands on the Chesapeake Bay to the east of present-day Washington County. Contact between the Susquehannock and these English settlers was limited until English merchant William Claiborne from Virginia began trading with the Susquehannock in the 1630s.

In 1634, England established the Province of Maryland as an English colony with their founding of St. Mary's City to the southeast of present-day Washington County. English-Susquehannock relations then began to deteriorate, as Maryland formed an alliance with the Piscataway people, who were the frequent target of Susquehannock raids. The founding of the province also disrupted their trade alliance with Claiborne as he refused to acknowledge Maryland's authority. In 1641, the Governor of Maryland declared the Susquehannock "enemies of the province", and Susquehannock raids on Maryland and the Piscataway continued intermittently until 1652.

=== Acquisition by Maryland ===
In the winter of 1652, the Susquehannock were attacked by the Mohawk, and although the attack was repulsed, it led to the Susquehannock negotiating the Articles of Peace and Friendship with Maryland. The Susquehannock relinquished their claim to territory on either side of the Chesapeake Bay and reestablished their earlier trading relationship with the English. In 1696, the province incorporated its western portions (including its claims to present-day Washington County) into Prince George's County. In 1707, Maryland became a British colony as the result of the union of the Kingdoms of England and Scotland.

In the 1730s, European settlers arrived in present-day Washington County, and in 1748, Frederick County, which then included Washington County, separated from Prince George's County. During the French and Indian War, Marylanders constructed Fort Frederick in 1756. Later, Maryland was one of the colonies that revolted to form the Thirteen Colonies during the American Revolutionary War in 1775. On September 6, 1776, Maryland formed Washington County from a part of Frederick County. It was the first county in the United States named after George Washington. The State of Maryland ratified the United States Constitution and officially joined the United States in 1788. In 1789, part of Washington County was divided to form Allegany County, which itself was later divided in 1872 to form Garrett County.

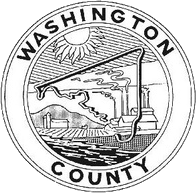
The Washington County seal from 1950 to 1988; de facto as it was never officially adopted.

Washington County has over 30 historical sites and is home to 3 National Parks, 7 State Parks, 14 County Parks, and numerous City and Town Parks. A number of properties in the county are listed on the National Register of Historic Places. The county's history includes riots during the Whiskey Rebellion, several Civil War battles including the Battle of Antietam, the site where the abolitionist John Brown planned his raid on Harpers Ferry, and the location of railroads that facilitated westward expansion of the United States.

== Geography ==
According to the U.S. Census Bureau, the county has a total area of 467 square miles (1,210 km^{2}), of which 458 square miles (1,190 km^{2}) is land and 9.6 square miles (25 km^{2}) (2.0%) is water.

Washington County is located in the Appalachian Mountains, stretching from the Ridge-and-Valley Country in the west to South Mountain in the east, which is an extension of the Blue Ridge. Much of the county lies in the broad Hagerstown Valley between these two zones; the valley is part of the Great Appalachian Valley that continues southward into Virginia and West Virginia as the Shenandoah Valley and northward into Pennsylvania as the Cumberland Valley.

The county is bordered to the north by the Mason–Dixon line with Pennsylvania, to the south by the Potomac River and the states of Virginia and West Virginia, to the west by Sideling Hill Creek and Allegany County, Maryland, and to the east by Frederick County and South Mountain.

=== Adjacent counties ===
- Fulton County, Pennsylvania (northwest)
- Franklin County, Pennsylvania (north)
- Frederick County (east)
- Loudoun County, Virginia (southeast)
- Jefferson County, West Virginia (south)
- Berkeley County, West Virginia (south)
- Morgan County, West Virginia (southwest)
- Allegany County (west)

=== Major highways ===
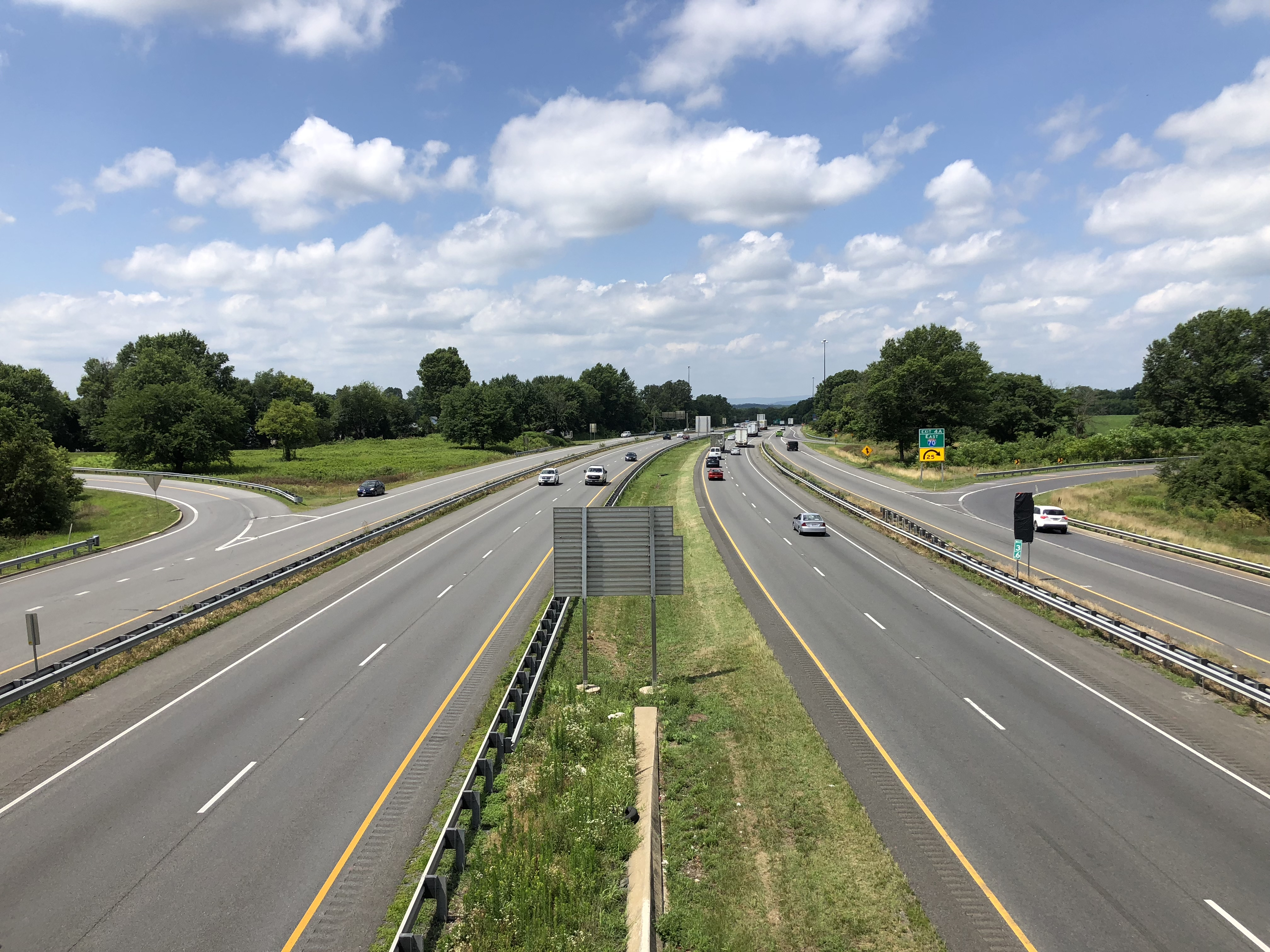
View south along I-81 from I-70 in Washington County

- Interstate 68
- Interstate 70
- Interstate 81
- U.S. Route 11
- U.S. Route 40
- U.S. Route 40 Alternate
- US 40 Scenic
- U.S. Route 340
- U.S. Route 522
- Maryland Route 34
- Maryland Route 56
- Maryland Route 57
- Maryland Route 58
- Maryland Route 60
- Maryland Route 62
- Maryland Route 63
- Maryland Route 64
- Maryland Route 65
- Maryland Route 66
- Maryland Route 67
- Maryland Route 68
- Maryland Route 77
- Maryland Route 144
- Maryland Route 180
- Maryland Route 418
- Maryland Route 491
- Maryland Route 494
- Maryland Route 550
- Maryland Route 615
- Maryland Route 632

== Demographics ==
Historical population
Census	Pop.	Note	%±
1790	15,822		—
1800	18,650		17.9%
1810	18,730		0.4%
1820	23,075		23.2%
1830	25,268		9.5%
1840	28,850		14.2%
1850	30,848		6.9%
1860	31,417		1.8%
1870	34,712		10.5%
1880	38,561		11.1%
1890	39,782		3.2%
1900	45,133		13.5%
1910	49,617		9.9%
1920	59,694		20.3%
1930	65,882		10.4%
1940	68,838		4.5%
1950	78,886		14.6%
1960	91,219		15.6%
1970	103,829		13.8%
1980	113,086		8.9%
1990	121,393		7.3%
2000	131,923		8.7%
2010	147,430		11.8%
2020	154,705		4.9%
2025 (est.)	157,731	▲	2.0%
U.S. Decennial Census; 1790-1960 1900-1990; 1990-2000 2010–2018

=== Racial and ethnic composition ===
Washington County, Maryland – Racial and ethnic composition Note: the US Census treats Hispanic/Latino as an ethnic category. This table excludes Latinos from the racial categories and assigns them to a separate category. Hispanics/Latinos may be of any race.
Race / Ethnicity (NH = Non-Hispanic)	Pop 1980	Pop 1990	Pop 2000	Pop 2010	Pop 2020	% 1980	% 1990	% 2000	% 2010	% 2020
White alone (NH)	107,067	112,325	117,518	122,748	115,223	94.68%	92.53%	89.08%	83.26%	74.48%
Black or African American alone (NH)	4,718	7,124	10,150	13,836	17,241	4.17%	5.87%	7.69%	9.38%	11.14%
Native American or Alaska Native alone (NH)	103	216	223	244	253	0.09%	0.18%	0.17%	0.17%	0.16%
Asian alone (NH)	426	772	1,043	2,042	3,083	0.38%	0.64%	0.79%	1.39%	1.99%
Native Hawaiian or Pacific Islander alone (NH)	x	x	52	61	63	x	x	0.04%	0.04%	0.04%
Other race alone (NH)	107	51	150	201	731	0.09%	0.04%	0.11%	0.14%	0.47%
Mixed race or Multiracial (NH)	x	x	1,217	3,194	7,822	x	x	0.92%	2.17%	5.06%
Hispanic or Latino (any race)	665	905	1,570	5,104	10,289	0.59%	0.75%	1.19%	3.46%	6.65%
Total	113,086	121,393	131,923	147,430	154,705	100.00%	100.00%	100.00%	100.00%	100.00%

=== 2020 census ===
As of the 2020 census, the county had a population of 154,705. The median age was 41.0 years. 21.7% of residents were under the age of 18 and 18.1% of residents were 65 years of age or older. For every 100 females there were 101.6 males, and for every 100 females age 18 and over there were 101.4 males age 18 and over. 67.8% of residents lived in urban areas, while 32.2% lived in rural areas.

The racial makeup of the county was 75.9% White, 11.4% Black or African American, 0.3% American Indian and Alaska Native, 2.0% Asian, 0.1% Native Hawaiian and Pacific Islander, 3.0% from some other race, and 7.3% from two or more races. Hispanic or Latino residents of any race comprised 6.7% of the population.

There were 58,640 households in the county, of which 30.0% had children under the age of 18 living with them and 27.1% had a female householder with no spouse or partner present. About 27.7% of all households were made up of individuals and 12.7% had someone living alone who was 65 years of age or older.

There were 63,790 housing units, of which 8.1% were vacant. Among occupied housing units, 64.3% were owner-occupied and 35.7% were renter-occupied. The homeowner vacancy rate was 1.7% and the rental vacancy rate was 7.8%.

=== 2010 census ===
As of the 2010 United States census, there were 147,430 people, 55,687 households, and 37,506 families residing in the county. The population density was 322.1 inhabitants per square mile (124.4/km^{2}). There were 60,814 housing units at an average density of 132.8 per square mile (51.3/km^{2}). The racial makeup of the county was 85.1% white, 9.6% black or African American, 1.4% Asian, 0.2% American Indian, 1.1% from other races, and 2.6% from two or more races. Those of Hispanic or Latino origin made up 3.5% of the population. In terms of ancestry, 31.7% were German, 14.1% were Irish, 9.8% were English, 8.5% were American, and 5.1% were Italian.

Of the 55,687 households, 32.4% had children under the age of 18 living with them, 50.6% were married couples living together, 12.0% had a female householder with no husband present, 32.6% were non-families, and 26.6% of all households were made up of individuals. The average household size was 2.50 and the average family size was 3.01. The median age was 39.7 years.

The median income for a household in the county was $52,994 and the median income for a family was $65,811. Males had a median income of $47,622 versus $34,225 for females. The per capita income for the county was $26,588. About 7.7% of families and 10.4% of the population were below the poverty line, including 14.1% of those under age 18 and 8.8% of those age 65 or over.

=== 2000 census ===
As of the census of 2010, there were 147,430 people, 49,726 households, and 34,112 families residing in the county. The population density was 315 inhabitants per square mile (122/km^{2}). There were 52,972 housing units at an average density of 116 per square mile (45/km^{2}). The racial makeup of the county was 89.71% White or Caucasian, 7.77% Black or African American, 0.18% Native American, 0.80% Asian, 0.04% Pacific Islander, 0.46% from other races, and 1.04% from two or more races. 1.19% of the population were Hispanic or Latino of any race, 32.1% identified as being of German ancestry, 21.4% American, 8.8% Irish, and 8.4% English ancestry.

There were 49,726 households, out of which 31.30% had children under the age of 18 living with them, 54.00% were married couples living together, 10.70% had a female householder with no husband present, and 31.40% were non-families. 26.00% of all households were made up of individuals, and 11.10% had someone living alone who was 65 years of age or older. The average household size was 2.46 and the average family size was 2.96.

In the county, the population was spread out, with 23.40% under the age of 18, 8.10% from 18 to 24, 31.30% from 25 to 44, 23.00% from 45 to 64, and 14.20% who were 65 years of age or older. The median age was 37 years. For every 100 females, there were 104.50 males. For every 100 females age 18 and over, there were 104.00 males.

== Communities ==
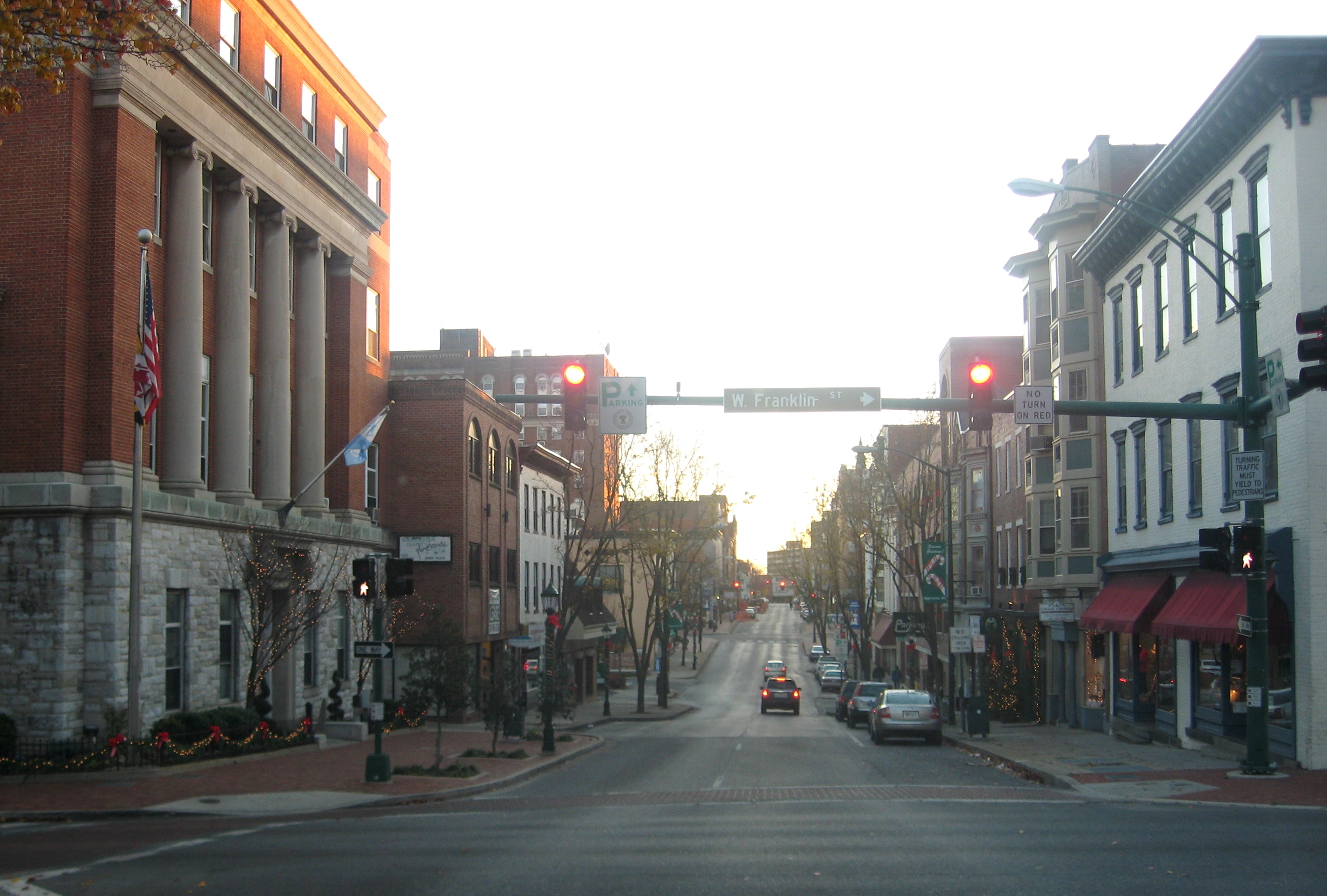
Hagerstown

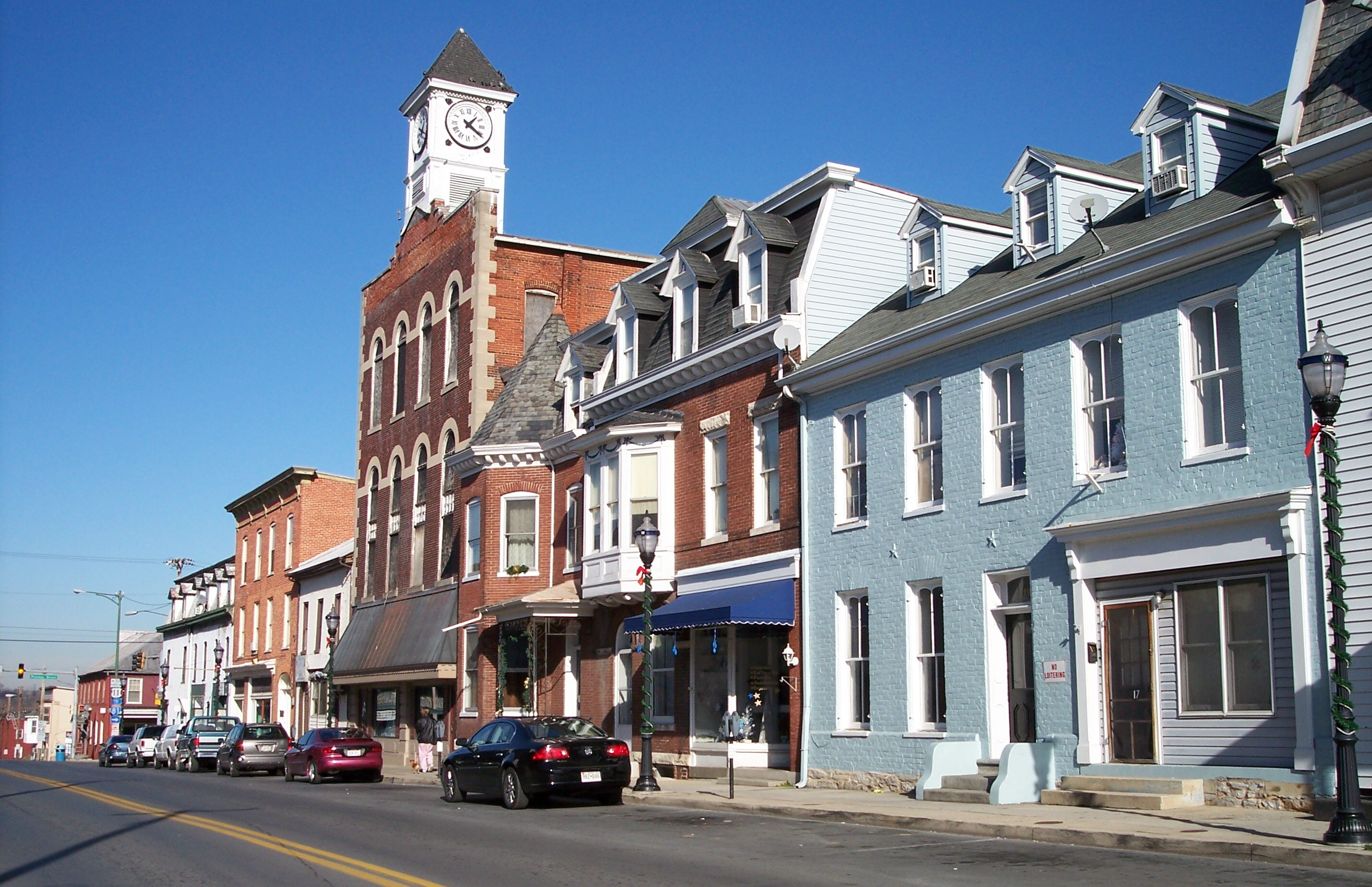
Williamsport

=== City ===
- Hagerstown (county seat)

=== Towns ===
- Boonsboro
- Clear Spring
- Funkstown
- Hancock
- Keedysville
- Sharpsburg
- Smithsburg
- Williamsport

=== Census-designated places ===
The Census Bureau recognizes the following census-designated places in the county:

- Antietam
- Bagtown
- Bakersville
- Beaver Creek
- Big Pool
- Big Spring
- Breathedsville
- Brownsville
- Cavetown
- Cearfoss
- Charlton
- Chewsville
- Dargan
- Downsville
- Eakles Mill
- Edgemont
- Ernstville
- Fairplay
- Fairview
- Fort Ritchie
- Fountainhead-Orchard Hills
- Gapland
- Garretts Mill
- Greensburg
- Halfway
- Highfield-Cascade
- Indian Springs
- Jugtown
- Kemps Mill
- Leitersburg
- Mapleville
- Maugansville
- Mercersville
- Middleburg
- Mount Aetna
- Mount Briar
- Mount Lena
- Paramount-Long Meadow
- Pecktonville
- Pinesburg
- Pondsville
- Reid
- Ringgold
- Robinwood
- Rohrersville
- Saint James
- San Mar
- Sandy Hook
- Tilghmanton
- Trego-Rohrersville Station
- Wilson-Conococheague
- Yarrowsburg

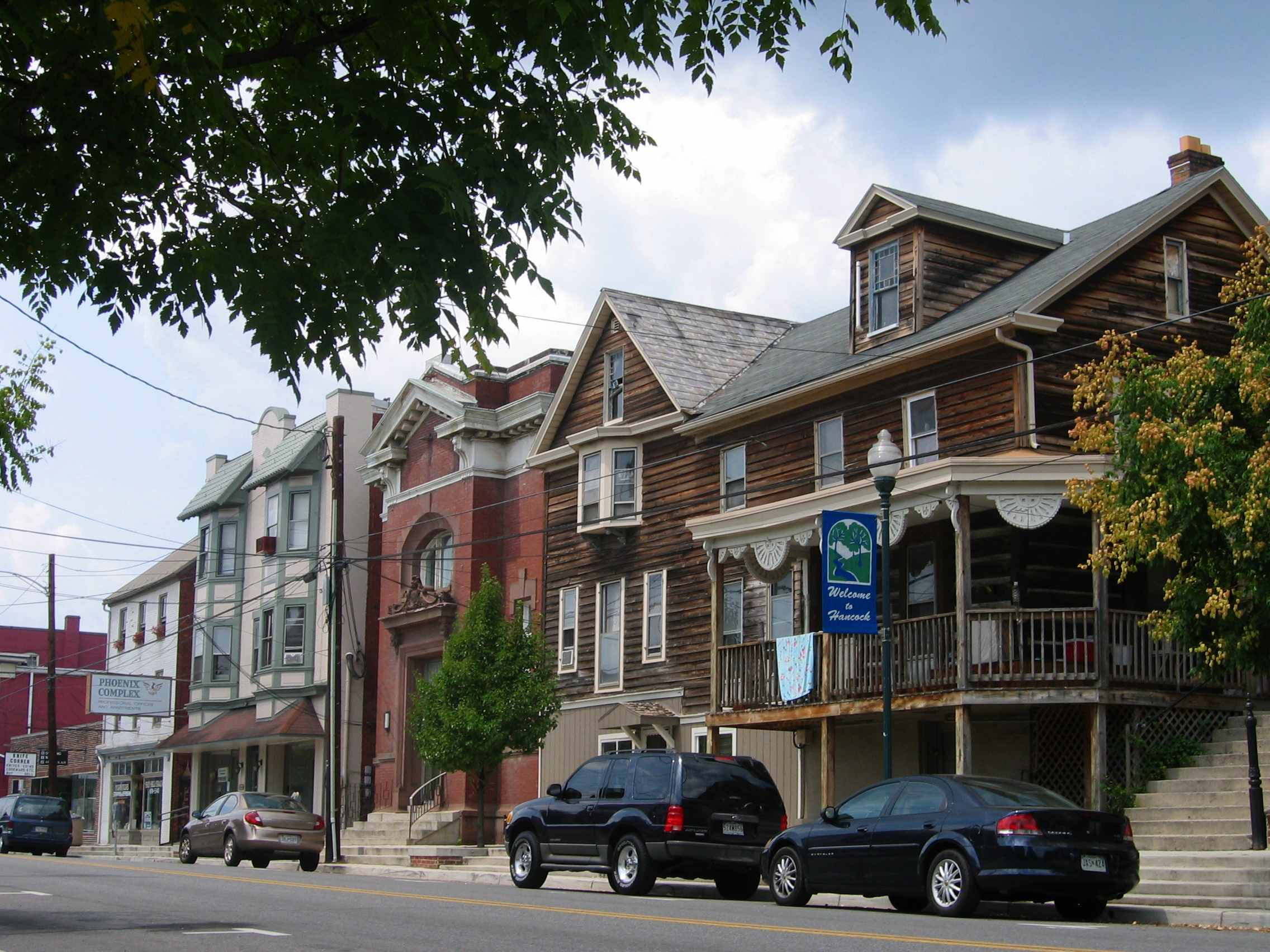
Hancock

=== Unincorporated communities ===
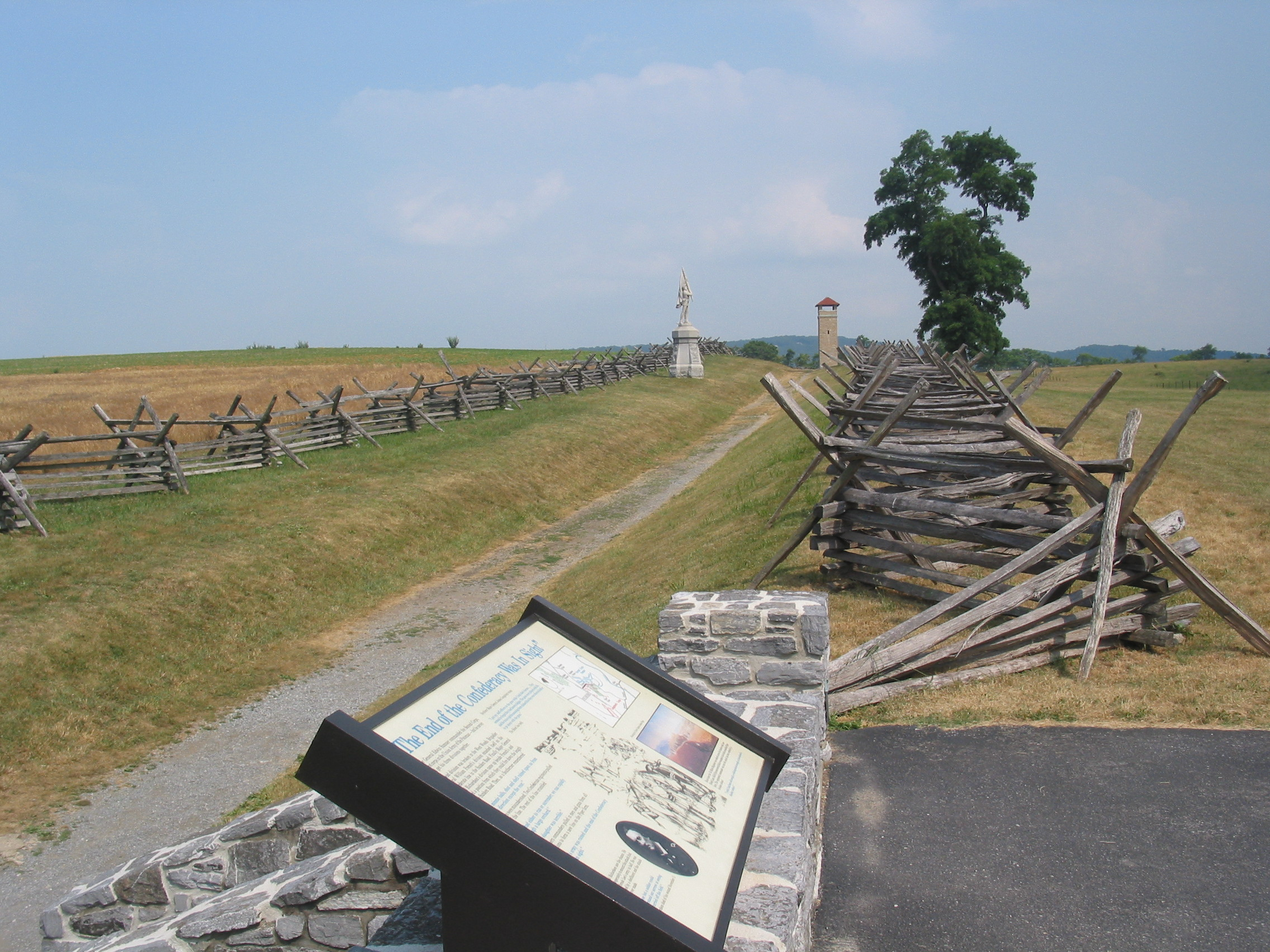
Sharpsburg

- Appletown
- Benevola
- Broadfording
- Burtner
- Huyett
- Pen Mar
- Samples Manor
- Spielman
- Trego
- Van Lear
- Weverton
- Woodmont
- Zittlestown

== Politics and government ==
=== Federal representation ===
The county is located within Maryland's 6th congressional district. The representative of the district currently is April McClain Delaney (D).

Like most of Appalachia, German-influenced and Unionist Western Maryland, Washington County is solidly Republican. The last Democrat to carry Washington County at a Presidential level was Lyndon Johnson during his 1964 landslide win over Barry Goldwater, although between 1888 and 1940 the county was a consistent bellwether for all Presidential elections.

=== Voter registration ===
Voter registration and party enrollment as of June 2025
Republican	45,519	44.19%
Democratic	30,603	29.71%
Unaffiliated	24,959	24.23%
Other parties	1,681	1.63%
Total	102,997	100%

United States presidential election results for Washington County, Maryland
Year	Republican		Democratic		Third party(ies)	
Year	No.	%	No.	%	No.	%
1892	4,373	47.16%	4,667	50.33%	233	2.51%
1896	5,428	53.57%	4,382	43.24%	323	3.19%
1900	5,475	52.05%	4,862	46.22%	182	1.73%
1904	4,581	51.86%	4,064	46.01%	188	2.13%
1908	4,650	49.59%	4,518	48.18%	209	2.23%
1912	1,907	19.99%	4,589	48.10%	3,044	31.91%
1916	5,093	45.88%	5,642	50.83%	365	3.29%
1920	8,757	54.75%	6,852	42.84%	386	2.41%
1924	7,460	54.21%	4,620	33.57%	1,682	12.22%
1928	12,404	67.78%	5,816	31.78%	81	0.44%
1932	8,929	43.50%	11,370	55.39%	228	1.11%
1936	10,619	42.96%	14,050	56.84%	49	0.20%
1940	11,054	43.76%	14,125	55.91%	83	0.33%
1944	12,227	51.83%	11,365	48.17%	0	0.00%
1948	11,887	52.53%	10,588	46.79%	155	0.68%
1952	17,653	58.08%	12,657	41.64%	84	0.28%
1956	19,455	62.72%	11,562	37.28%	0	0.00%
1960	17,828	53.28%	15,632	46.72%	0	0.00%
1964	12,756	39.11%	19,858	60.89%	0	0.00%
1968	16,050	47.13%	11,266	33.08%	6,737	19.78%
1972	24,234	69.27%	10,039	28.70%	712	2.04%
1976	20,194	55.95%	15,902	44.05%	0	0.00%
1980	22,901	58.60%	14,118	36.12%	2,064	5.28%
1984	27,118	66.68%	13,329	32.78%	219	0.54%
1988	25,912	63.76%	14,408	35.45%	318	0.78%
1992	21,977	47.56%	16,495	35.70%	7,736	16.74%
1996	21,434	50.86%	16,481	39.11%	4,227	10.03%
2000	27,948	58.88%	18,221	38.38%	1,301	2.74%
2004	36,917	63.76%	20,387	35.21%	600	1.04%
2008	34,169	55.47%	26,245	42.61%	1,186	1.93%
2012	36,074	57.48%	25,042	39.90%	1,639	2.61%
2016	40,998	62.13%	21,129	32.02%	3,864	5.86%
2020	40,224	59.35%	26,044	38.42%	1,511	2.23%
2024	44,054	60.07%	27,260	37.17%	2,018	2.75%

=== State representation ===
Washington County is represented by two senators in the Maryland State Senate. Member Mike McKay (R), serves the 1st district in Maryland and Paul D. Corderman (R), serves in the 2nd district. The county also is represented in Maryland General Assembly's other primary division, the Maryland House of Delegates. Delegates who stand for Washington County include: Terry Baker (R) for District 1C, William Valentine (R) and William J. Wivell (R) for District 2A and Matthew Schindler (D) for District 2B.

=== County government ===
Washington County's "leader" is known as the County Administrator. Currently, Michelle Gordon serves as the County Administrator. However, Washington County's County Commissioners exercise executive powers as they exist in the government of the county.

The County Commissioners in Washington County comprise the traditional form of county government in Maryland. Current members include: John Barr (President) (R), Jeffrey A. Cline (Vice President) (R), Randall Wagner (R), Derek Harvey (R), and Randy Leatherman (R).

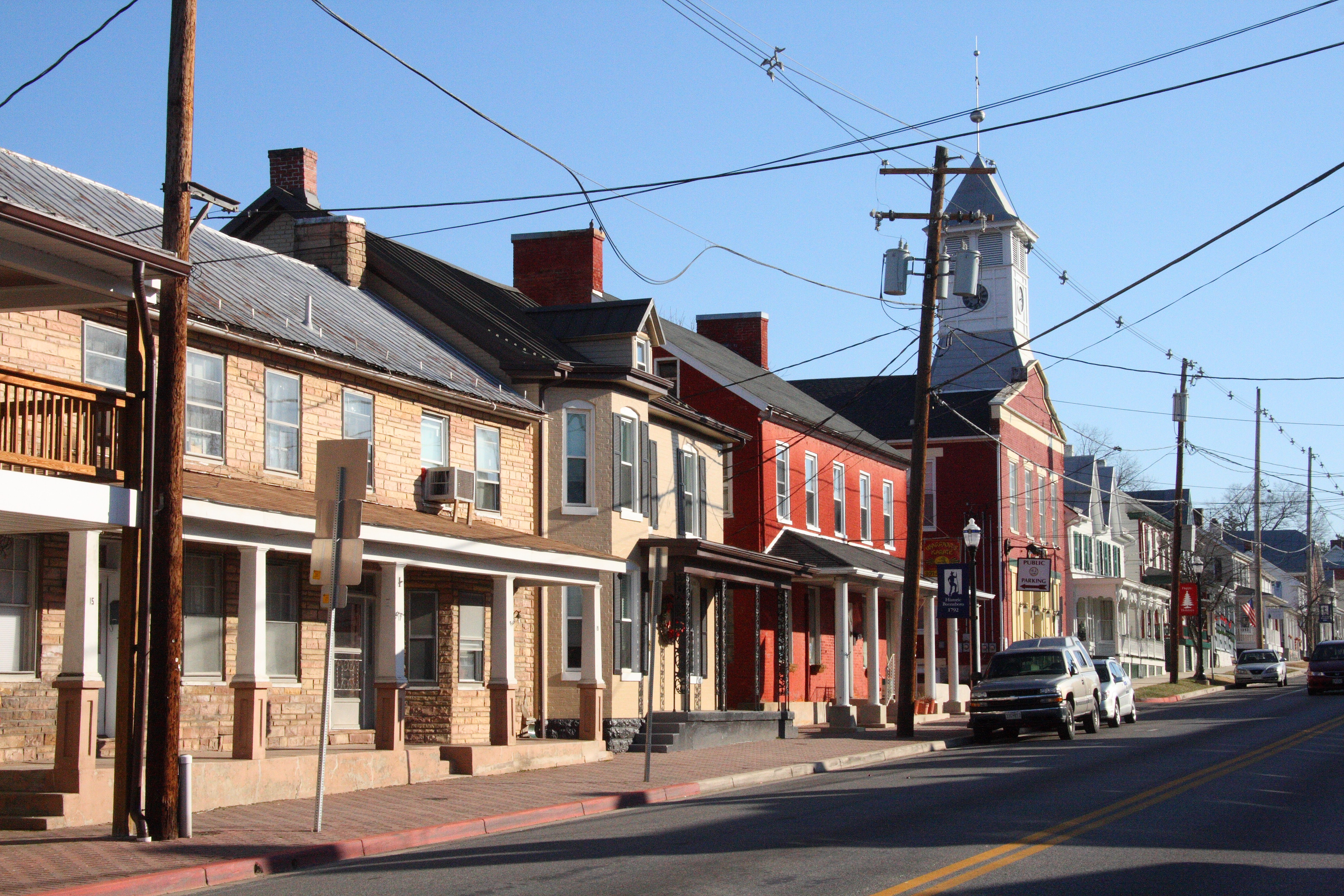
Boonsboro

== Economy ==
In 2000, the median income for a household in the county was $40,617, and the median income for a family was $48,962. Males had a median income of $34,917 versus $24,524 for females. The per capita income for the county was $20,062. About 7.00% of families and 9.50% of the population were below the poverty line, including 12.30% of those under age 18 and 9.50% of those age 65 or over.

According to the Maryland Department of Business and Economic Development, the following were the major employers in the county (excluding post offices, state government, and local governments, but including public institutions of higher education):

Employer	Employees (Nov. 2014)
Meritus Health	2,730
Citi	2,700
First Data	2,322
Volvo Group	1,350
The Bowman Group	718
FedEx Ground	648
Staples Inc.	597
Hagerstown Community College	594
Merkle Response Management Group	545
Arc of Washington County	500
Direct Mail Processors	500
Walmart/Sam's Club	500
Sierra Nevada Corp.	486
Giant Food Stores/ Martin's Food Markets	420
Weis Markets	400
Brook Lane Health Services	395
Lehigh Phoenix	360
A.C.&T	350
Susquehanna Bancshares	345
Dot Foods	312
JLG Industries	300
Home Depot	296
Lowe's	276
Thompson's Gas & Electric Service	275
United Parcel Service (UPS)	274
CertainTeed	250
Darden Restaurants	250
Sheetz	250
Tractor Supply	250
Homewood Retirement Centers	249
NMS Healthcare of Hagerstown	240
Horizon Goodwill Industries	229
C. William Hetzer	225
FedEx Freight	225

Washington County is top in the state for commercial production of fruits, tree nuts, and berries.

== Parks and recreation ==
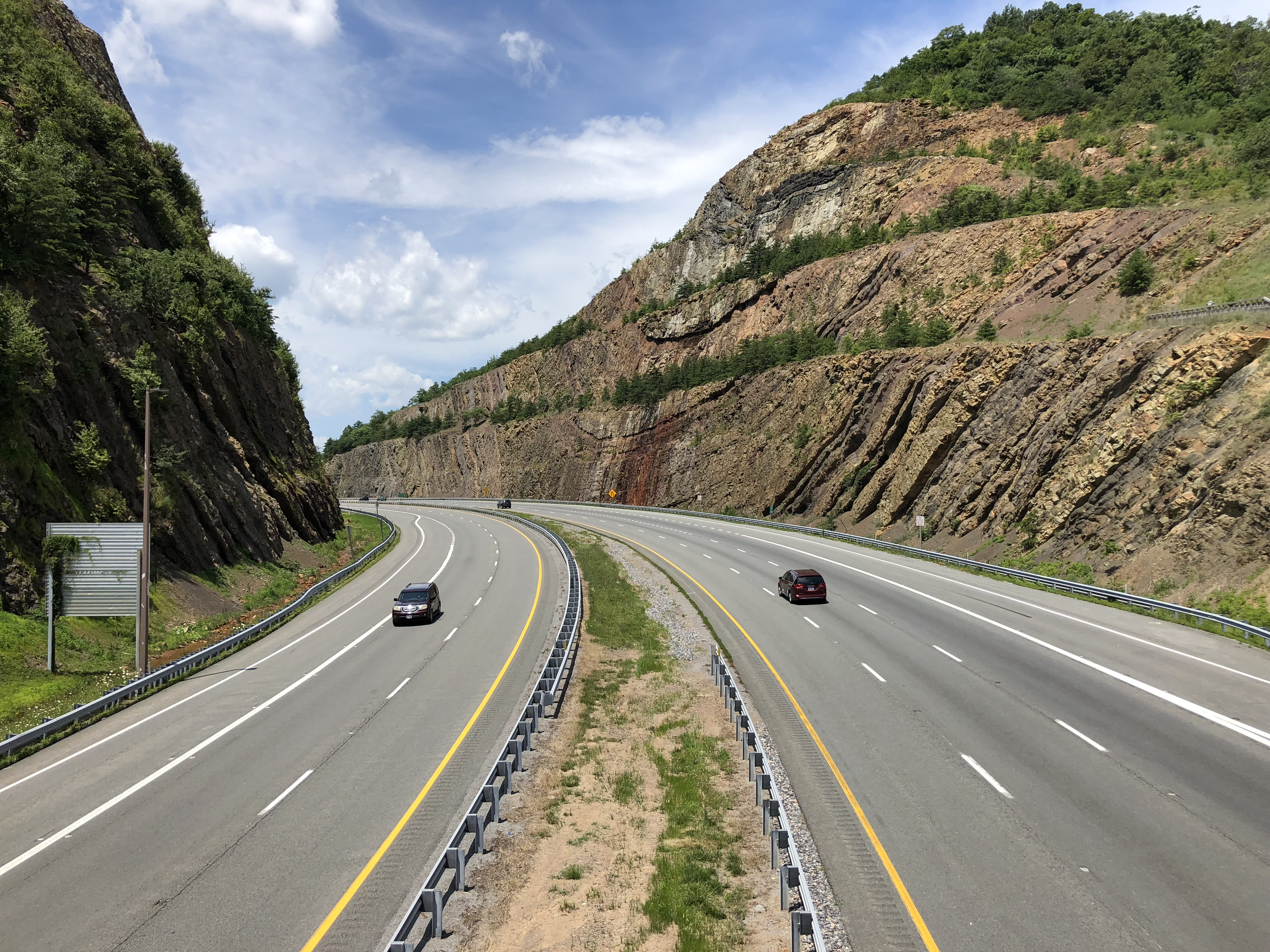
Sideling Hill man-made mountain pass on I-68/U.S. 40 near Hancock

=== National parks ===
- Antietam National Battlefield
- Appalachian National Scenic Trail
- Chesapeake and Ohio Canal National Historical Park
- Harpers Ferry National Historical Park

=== State parks ===
- Fort Frederick State Park
- Fort Tonoloway State Park
- Gathland State Park
- Greenbrier State Park
- South Mountain State Park
- Washington Monument State Park

=== Museums, historic sites, and other points of interest ===
- Bowman House, Boonsboro
- Crystal Grottoes, the only show caves in Maryland.
- Discovery Station, Hagerstown
- Hager House, Hagerstown
- Hagerstown Roundhouse Museum, Hagerstown
- Price-Miller House, Hagerstown
- Sideling Hill, man-made mountain pass on Interstate 68/U.S. Route 40 roughly 5 miles (8.0 km) west of Hancock shows off 100 million years+ of rock formation with Information Center and walkways on the premises.
- Springfield Farm, Williamsport
- Stoney Creek Farm, Boonsboro
- Washington County Museum of Fine Arts, Hagerstown
- Washington County Rural Heritage Museum, Boonsboro

== Education ==
Washington County Public Schools administers public schools in the county. See Washington County Public Schools – School Directory for a detailed listing of elementary, middle, high, and other schools.

=== High schools ===
Public high schools

- Antietam Academy, Hagerstown
- Barbara Ingram School for the Arts, Hagerstown
- Boonsboro High School, Boonsboro
- Clear Spring High School, Clear Spring
- Evening High School, Hagerstown
- Hancock High School, Hancock
- North Hagerstown High School, Hagerstown
- Smithsburg High School, Smithsburg
- South Hagerstown High School, Hagerstown
- Washington County Technical High School, Hagerstown
- Williamsport High School, Williamsport

Private high schools

- Broadfording Academy, Hagerstown
- Emmanuel Christian School, Hagerstown
- Gateway Academy, Williamsport
- Grace Academy, Hagerstown
- Heritage Academy, Hagerstown
- Highland View Academy, Hagerstown
- St. James School, Saint James
- St. Maria Goretti High School, Hagerstown
- Truth Christian Academy, Hagerstown

=== Colleges and universities ===
- Antietam Bible College, Biblical Seminary, and Graduate School
- Hagerstown Community College, two-year public community college
- Kaplan College (formerly Hagerstown Business College)
- Mount Saint Mary's University, Hagerstown Campus, offers Master of Business Administration (MBA) program.
- University System of Maryland at Hagerstown, branch of the University System of Maryland; offers various associate's, bachelor's, and master's degree programs in connection with other state colleges and universities in Maryland.

== Notable residents and natives ==
- See People from Washington County.

== See also ==
- National Register of Historic Places listings in Washington County, Maryland
- Washington County Closed-Circuit Educational Television Project
