= Maryland Route 68 =

State highway in Washington County, Maryland, US

Maryland Route 68
- Maryland Route 68 highlighted in red

Route information
- Maintained by MDSHA and Town of Williamsport
- Length: 18.50 mi (29.77 km)
- Existed: 1927–present
- Tourist routes: Chesapeake and Ohio Canal Scenic Byway; Historic National Road Scenic Byway

Major junctions
- West end: US 40 in Clear Spring
- I-70 in Clear Spring; MD 56 near Pinesburg; MD 63 in Williamsport; US 11 in Williamsport; I-81 in Williamsport; MD 632 near St. James; MD 65 at Lappans
- East end: US 40 Alt. in Boonsboro

Location
- Country: United States
- State: Maryland
- Counties: Washington

Highway system
- Maryland highway system; Interstate; US; State; Scenic Byways
← I-68	→ I-70

Maryland Route 68 (MD 68) is a state highway in the U.S. state of Maryland. The state highway runs 18.50 miles (29.77 km) from U.S. Route 40 (US 40) in Clear Spring east to US 40 Alternate in Boonsboro. MD 68 crosses central Washington County to the south of Hagerstown, connecting Clear Spring and Boonsboro with Williamsport, where the highway runs concurrently with MD 63. A small segment of MD 68 west of Boonsboro was constructed around 1920, using as part of the route two early 19th-century stone bridges. The remainder of the highway between Boonsboro and Williamsport was constructed in the second half of the 1920s. MD 68 was extended west from Williamsport to Clear Spring in the mid-1950s. The state highway was relocated south of Williamsport for the construction of Interstate 81 (I-81) in the mid-1960s. Since the early 1990s, I-68 has also existed in Washington County; signs on I-70 aim to avoid confusion between I-68 and MD 68.

== Route description ==
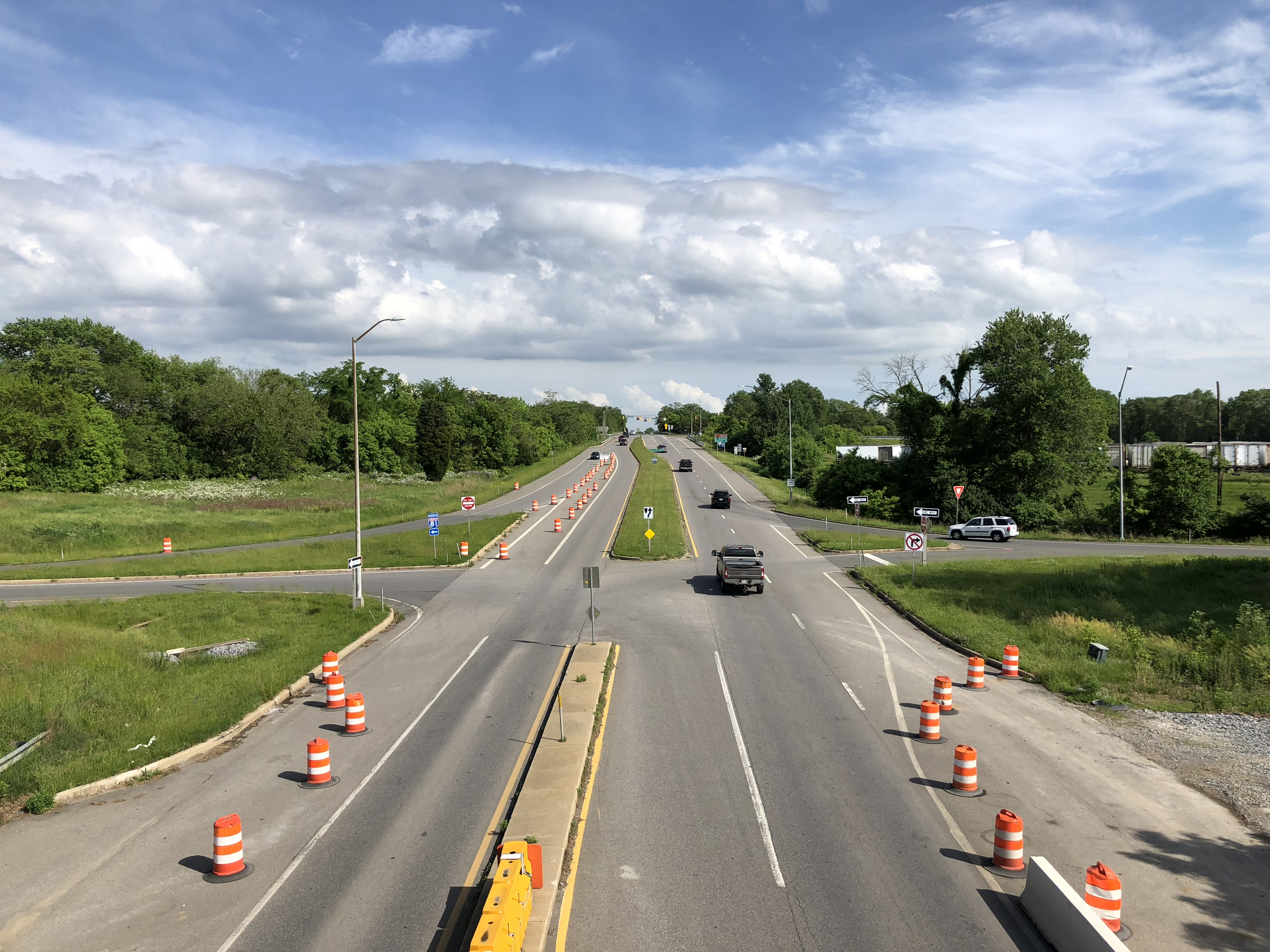
View south alond MD 63 and west along MD 68 at I-81 near Williamsport

MD 68 begins at an intersection with US 40 (Cumberland Street) in the town of Clear Spring. The state highway heads south as four-lane undivided Mill Street through a commercial area. MD 68's name changes to Clear Spring Road after leaving the town limits. The state highway meets I-70 (Eisenhower Memorial Highway) at a diamond interchange, then heads southeast through farmland as a two-lane undivided road, where the highway crosses Little Conococheague Creek. MD 68 intersects the eastern end of MD 56 (Big Pool Road) shortly before passing through the village of Pinesburg. The state highway intersects CSX's Lurgan Subdivision rail line at-grade and passes between industrial properties, then crosses Conococheague Creek and enters the town of Williamsport. MD 68 is municipally maintained within the town, where the highway follows Conococheague Street south through an intersection with US 11 (Potomac Street). At this intersection, MD 63 joins MD 68 in a concurrency to continue through the Williamsport Historic District. The two highways leave the town limits at their diamond interchange with I-81 (Maryland Veterans Memorial Highway), through which the roadway temporarily expands to a four-lane divided highway. A park and ride lot is located within the northwest quadrant of this interchange.

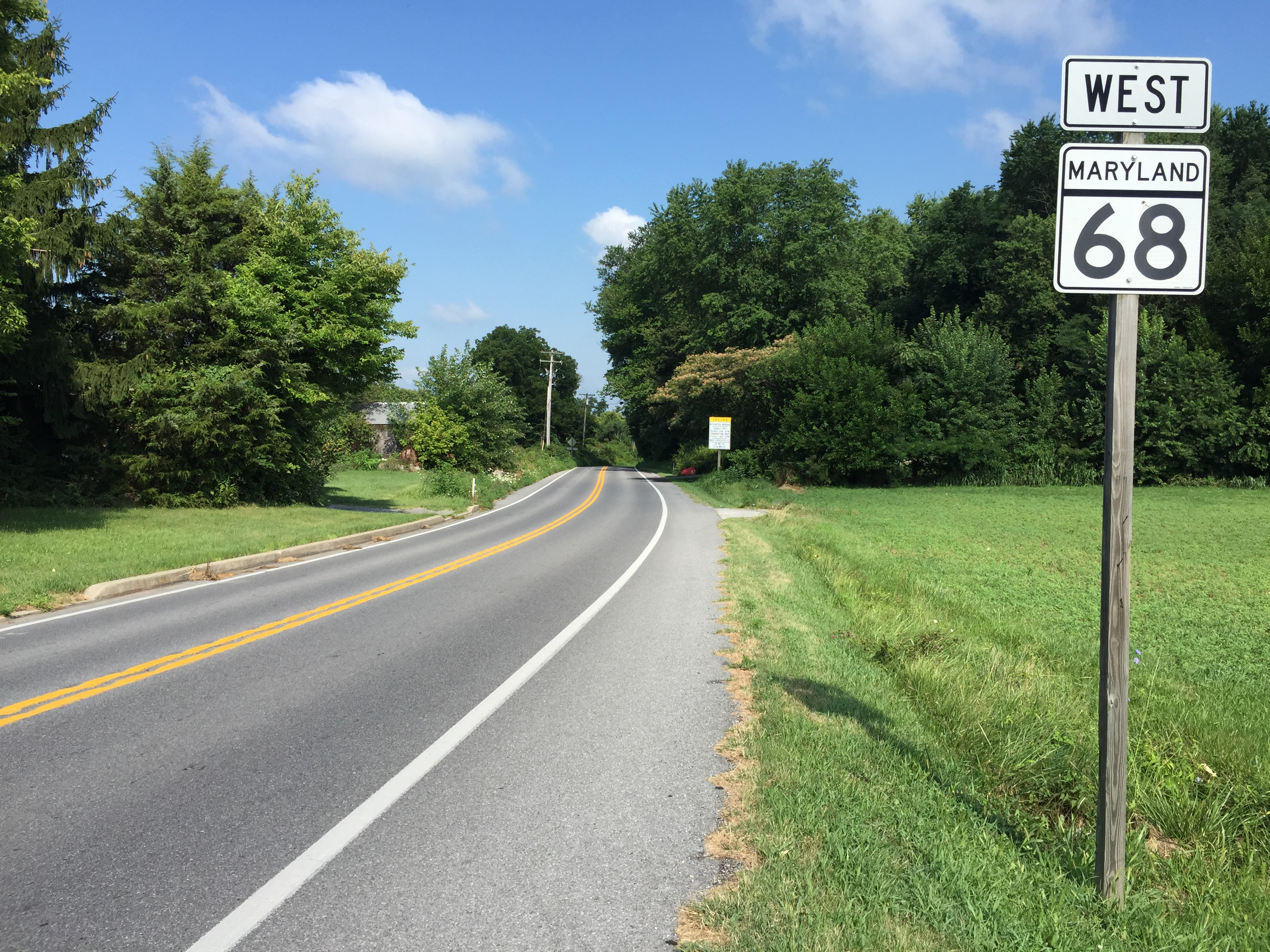
MD 68 westbound at Mill Point Road in Millpoint

MD 68's name changes to Lappans Road south of Williamsport. MD 63 (Spielman Road) splits south from MD 68 at the same intersection as Governor Lane Boulevard, which serves an industrial park. MD 68 crosses over a Winchester and Western Railroad line and curves to the east, then resumes heading southeast after intersecting the eastern end of Kendle Road. The state highway heads southeast through farmland and intersects MD 632 (Downsville Pike). The road crosses Norfolk Southern Railway's Hagerstown District at-grade and crosses St. James Run in the hamlet of St. James. MD 68 intersects MD 65 (Sharpsburg Pike) in the hamlet of Lappans, where the highway passes north of St. Mark's Episcopal Church. The state highway passes through the hamlet of Brethedsville and passes Devils Backbone County Park as the highway follows Antietam Creek for a short distance. MD 68 crosses over the creek on a narrow stone bridge, then makes a sharp turn to the south to continue following the forested valley of the creek. The state highway crosses over Beaver Creek on a one-lane stone bridge before leaving the creek valley. MD 68 continues southeast through farmland and the hamlet of Millpoint before reaching its eastern terminus at US 40 Alternate (Main Street) on the northern edge of the town of Boonsboro.

== History ==
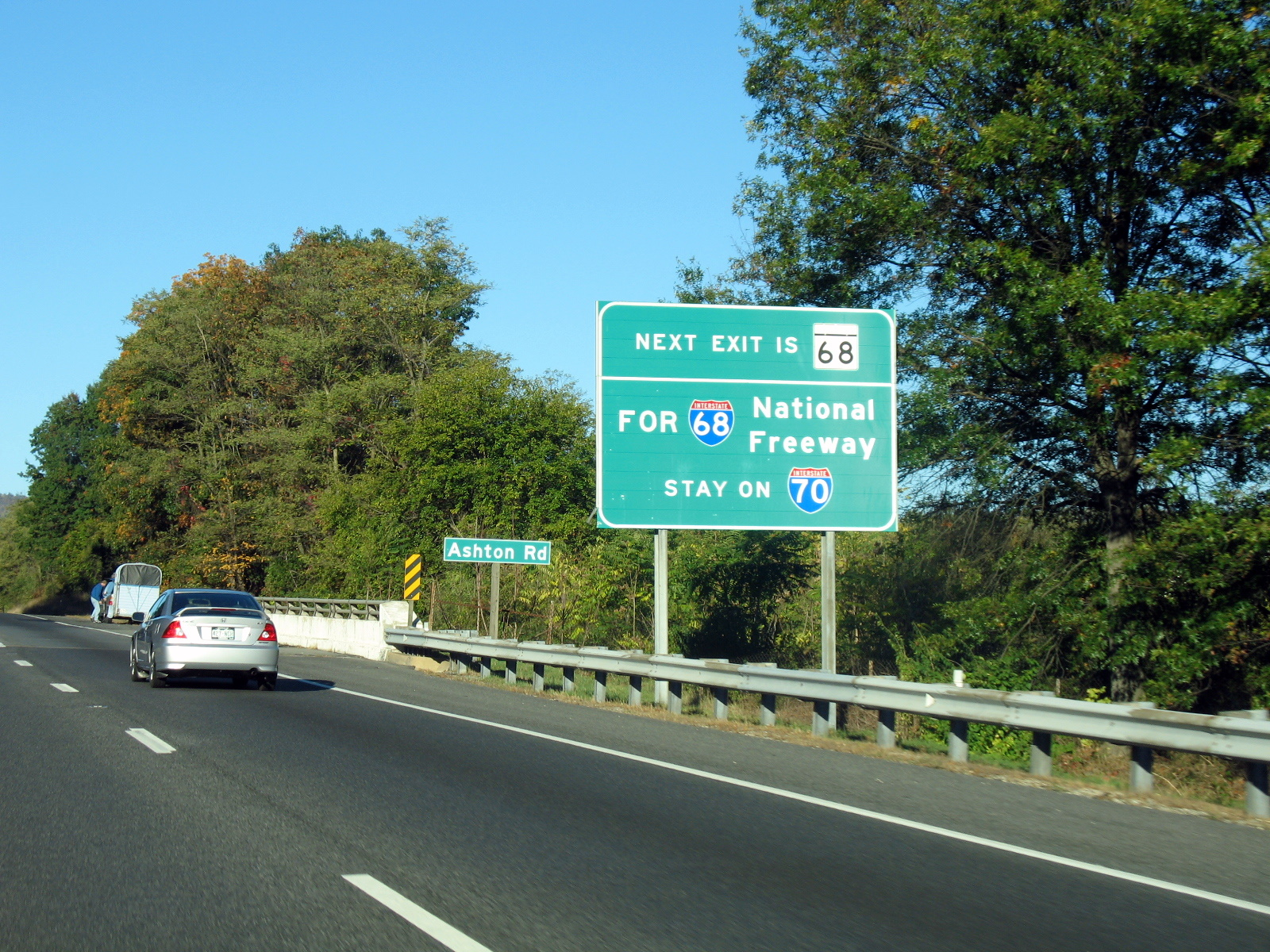
Disambiguation sign posted in advance of the MD 68 interchange on westbound I-70 near Clear Spring

The first section of MD 68, from Lappans to Millpoint near Boonsboro, was constructed in 1920. This segment made use of a pair of stone arch bridges over Antietam Creek and Beaver Creek constructed in 1833 and 1824, respectively. These bridges remain open to traffic as part of MD 68. MD 68 was extended east from Millpoint to Boonsboro in 1925. Construction of MD 68 from Williamsport to Lappans began in 1926, with a section complete from Williamsport to the Cumberland Valley Railroad (now Winchester and Western Railroad) by 1927. The last section of the Williamsport–Lappans Road was completed in 1930. The state highway's western terminus was originally US 11 in Williamsport, within which MD 68 followed Artizan Street south to Sunset Avenue at the southern town limit. Artizan Street continued south as MD 63 and MD 68 followed Sunset Avenue southeast toward Lappans. Clear Spring Road remained a county highway until MD 68 was extended west to Clear Spring in 1956.

MD 68 was relocated south of Williamsport, replacing Sunset Avenue and what is now Kendle Road, in 1965. The state highway was relocated for a grade separation of the Cumberland Valley Railroad and to tie into an interchange with I-81 and the south end of Conococheague Street. MD 63 joined MD 68 in a concurrency along Conococheague Street north to US 11. The new alignment of MD 68 and MD 63 was built as a four-lane divided highway around the interchange with I-81, which originally only contained ramps to and from the direction of West Virginia when the interchange opened with the completion of I-81 in 1966. That interchange was completed with ramps to and from Hagerstown between 1981 and 1989. Since the completion of I-68 in 1991, the Interstate and state-numbered highways with the same number have co-existed separated by 17 miles (27 km) on I-70. Multiple signs on westbound I-70 in advance of the Interstate's interchange with MD 68 advise motorists that I-68 and MD 68 are not the same highway and remind them to remain on I-70 to access I-68.

== Junction list ==
The entire route is in Washington County.

Location	mi	km	Destinations	Notes
Clear Spring	0.00	0.00	US 40 (Cumberland Street) / Mill Street north – Huyett, Indian Springs	Western terminus
Clear Spring	0.47	0.76	I-70 (Eisenhower Memorial Highway) – Hagerstown, Hancock	I-70 Exit 18
Pinesburg	2.74	4.41	MD 56 west (Big Pool Road) – Big Spring	Eastern terminus of MD 56
Williamsport	7.31	11.76	US 11 / MD 63 north (Potomac Street) – Hagerstown, Huyett, Martinsburg	West end of concurrency with MD 63
Williamsport	8.29	13.34	I-81 (Maryland Veterans Memorial Highway) – Harrisburg, Roanoke	I-81 Exit 1
Williamsport	8.52	13.71	MD 63 south (Spielman Road) – Downsville	East end of concurrency with MD 63
St. James	10.48	16.87	MD 632 (Downsville Pike) – Downsville, Hagerstown	
Lappans	13.35	21.48	MD 65 (Sharpsburg Pike) – Sharpsburg, Hagerstown	
Boonsboro	18.50	29.77	US 40 Alt. (Main Street) – Funkstown, Middletown	Eastern terminus
1.000 mi = 1.609 km; 1.000 km = 0.621 mi: Concurrency terminus
