= Maryland Route 65 =

State highway in Washington County, Maryland, US

Maryland Route 65
- Maryland Route 65 highlighted in red

Route information
- Maintained by MDSHA
- Length: 11.75 mi (18.91 km)
- Existed: 1927–present
- Tourist routes: Chesapeake and Ohio Canal Scenic Byway; Antietam Campaign Scenic Byway

Major junctions
- South end: MD 34 in Sharpsburg
- MD 63 in Fairplay; MD 68 in Lappans; I-70 in Hagerstown
- North end: Potomac Street in Hagerstown

Location
- Country: United States
- State: Maryland
- Counties: Washington

Highway system
- Maryland highway system; Interstate; US; State; Scenic Byways
← MD 64	→ MD 66

Maryland Route 65 (MD 65) is a state highway in the U.S. state of Maryland. Known for most of its length as Sharpsburg Pike, the state highway runs 11.75 miles (18.91 km) from MD 34 in Sharpsburg north to the southern end of Hagerstown, where the highway continues north as Potomac Street toward the downtown area. MD 65 connects central and southern Washington County and serves as the primary access point to Antietam National Battlefield. The state highway, which was originally laid out as a turnpike, was constructed in its modern form in the mid-1920s. MD 65 was rebuilt in the early 1950s and relocated through Antietam National Battlefield by the early 1980s.

== Route description ==
MD 65 begins at an intersection with MD 34 (Main Street) in the town of Sharpsburg. Church Street continues south toward Burnside's Bridge across Antietam Creek. MD 65 leaves Sharpsburg and heads north as two-lane undivided Sharpsburg Pike through Antietam National Battlefield, where the highway curves to the northwest and back north while the old alignment of MD 65, Dunker Church Road, continues straight to serve as the main entrance to the battlefield park. MD 65 continues north through farmland and scattered residences, passing west of the Washington County Agricultural Education Center, and reaches the village of Fairplay, where the state highway intersects MD 63 (Spielman Road). North of the intersection of MD 68 (Lappans Road) in Lappans, the state highway passes west of Maryland Correctional Institution - Hagerstown.

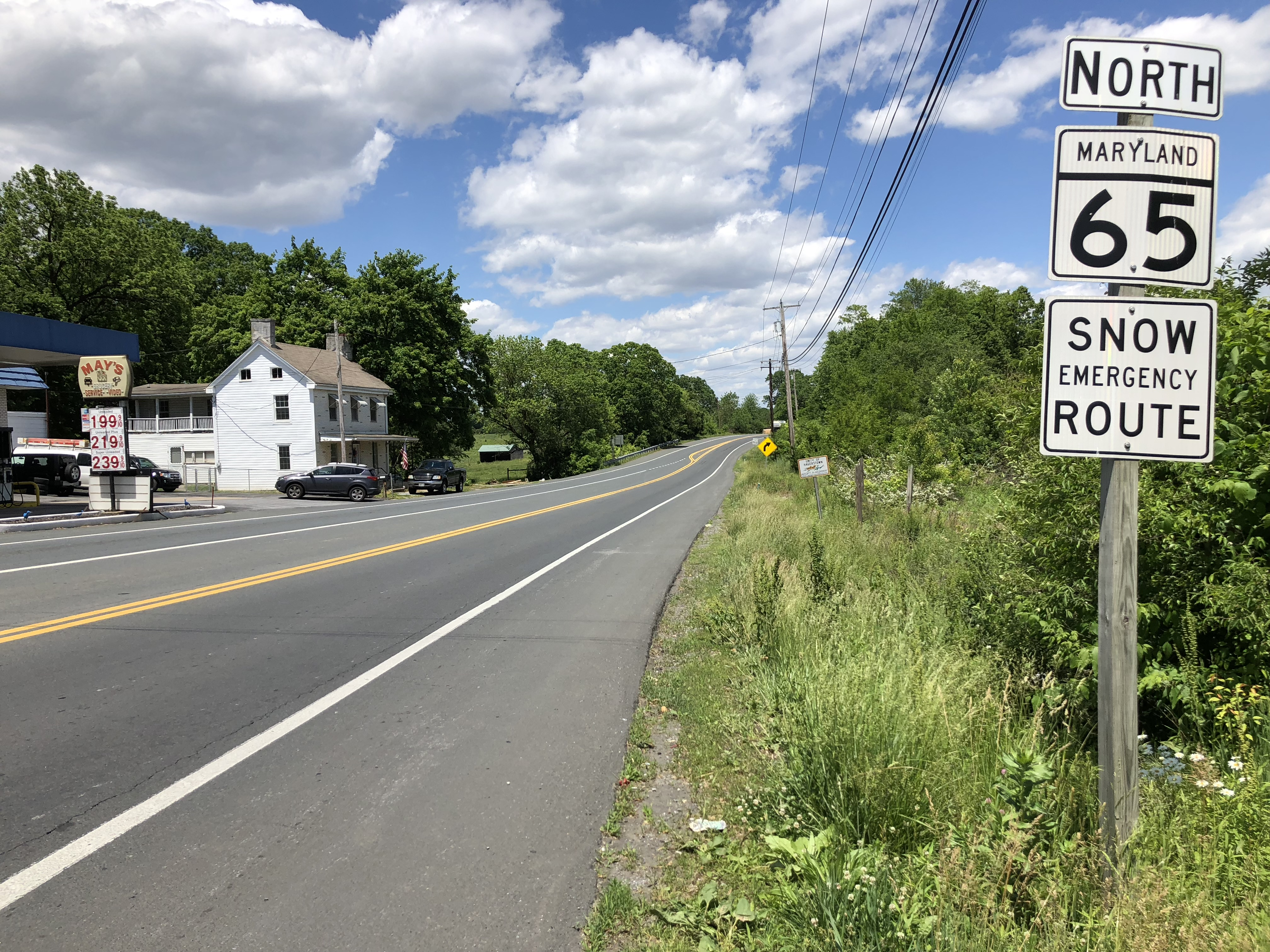
View north along MD 65 at MD 68 in Lappans

MD 65 passes between residential subdivisions in the community of St. James before reaching a partial cloverleaf interchange with Interstate 70 (I-70, Eisenhower Memorial Highway). A park and ride lot is located at the southeast quadrant of the interchange. The state highway temporarily expands to a four-lane divided highway through the interchange, south of which the state highway intersects Colonel Henry K. Douglas Drive, which is unsigned MD 65A. North of I-70, MD 65 passes east of the Hagerstown Premium Outlets. The state highway enters the city of Hagerstown just north of Oak Ridge Drive. MD 65 passes east of South Hagerstown High School before reaching its northern terminus at an arbitrary point adjacent to the high school's baseball field. The roadway continues north as Potomac Street, passing Rose Hill Cemetery, the Houses At 16-22 East Lee Street, and the Elliot-Bester House on its way toward downtown Hagerstown.

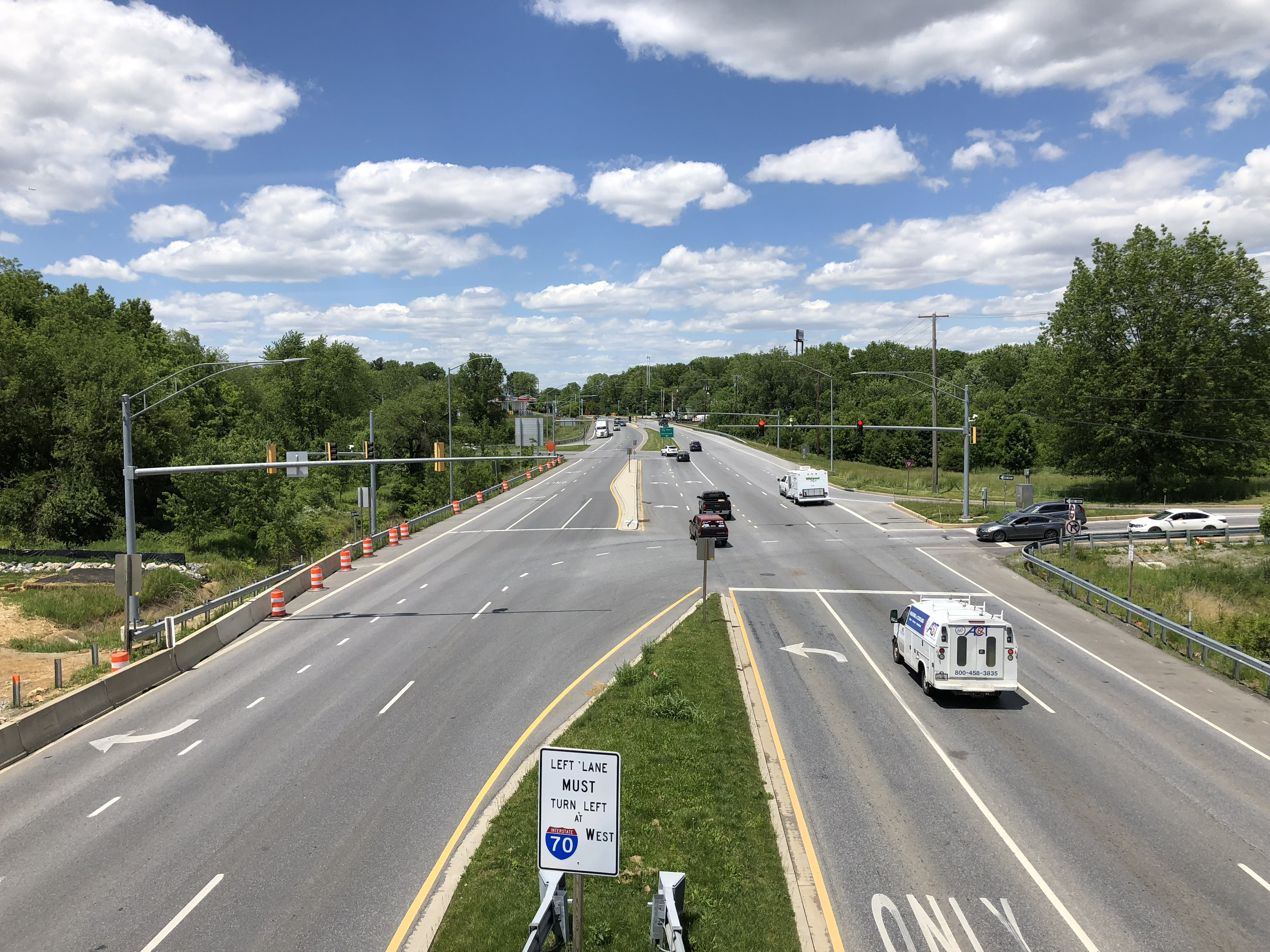
View north along MD 65 from I-70 in Hagerstown

MD 65 is a part of the National Highway System as a principal arterial from MD 63 at Fairplay north to its northern terminus in Hagerstown.

== History ==
The predecessor highway of MD 65 was the 19th century Hagerstown and Sharpsburg Turnpike. The first section of modern MD 65 was paved from Hagerstown to a point between Lappans and Fairplay around 1923. The remainder of the highway was completed south to Sharpsburg in 1926. MD 65 was extended south along Church Street and Burnside Bridge Road to Burnside's Bridge between 1930 and 1933. By 1961, MD 65's southern terminus was rolled back to MD 34. MD 65 was rebuilt and widened from Sharpsburg to Hagerstown in 1952 and 1953. MD 65's interchange with I-70 opened in 1968 when I-70 was completed from I-81 east to US 40. The interchange originally had two straight ramps on the north side of the interchange and two loop ramps on the south side; a straight ramp from eastbound I-70 to southbound MD 65 was added around 1995. MD 65 was placed on a new alignment through Antietam National Battlefield by 1981.

== Junction list ==
The entire route is in Washington County.

Location	mi	km	Destinations	Notes
Sharpsburg	0.00	0.00	MD 34 (Main Street) / Church Street south – Boonsboro, Shepherdstown	Southern terminus
Fairplay	5.72	9.21	MD 63 north (Spielman Road) – Downsville, Williamsport	Southern terminus of MD 63
Lappans	6.77	10.90	MD 68 (Lappans Road) – Boonsboro, Williamsport	
Hagerstown	10.55	16.98	I-70 (Eisenhower Memorial Highway) – Frederick, Hancock	Exit 29 (I-70)
Hagerstown	11.75	18.91	Potomac Street north	Northern terminus
1.000 mi = 1.609 km; 1.000 km = 0.621 mi

== Auxiliary route ==
MD 65A is the designation for Colonel Henry K. Douglas Drive, a 0.35-mile (0.56 km) spur west from MD 65 just south of I-70. The state highway provides access to the Maryland Motor Vehicle Administration's (MVA) Hagerstown center, a park and ride lot serving MTA Maryland commuter buses, the Maryland State Highway Administration's Hagerstown shop, and the Hagerstown barracks of the Maryland State Police. MD 65A is named for Henry Kyd Douglas, a staff officer to Stonewall Jackson in the Army of Northern Virginia who wrote the memoir I Rode With Stonewall. The highway was built concurrent with the construction of the new MVA service center in 1988 to provide a new connection between the police barracks and SHA shop and MD 65. The old access road was subsumed by the construction of a new ramp from eastbound I-70 to southbound MD 65 around 1995. The access road received the MD 65A designation in 2002.
