= Maryland Route 632 =

State highway in Maryland, United States

Maryland Route 632
- Downsville Pike
- Maryland Route 632 highlighted in red

Route information
- Maintained by MDSHA
- Length: 6.71 mi (10.80 km)
- Existed: 1938–present

Major junctions
- South end: MD 63 in Downsville
- MD 68 near St. James; I-70 in Halfway
- North end: Maryland Avenue in Hagerstown

Location
- Country: United States
- State: Maryland
- Counties: Washington

Highway system
- Maryland highway system; Interstate; US; State; Scenic Byways
← MD 631	→ MD 636

Maryland Route 632 (MD 632) is a state highway in the U.S. state of Maryland. Known as Downsville Pike, the state highway runs 6.71 miles (10.80 km) from MD 63 in Downsville north to Maryland Avenue in Hagerstown. MD 632 was constructed along the path of a former turnpike in the late 1930s. The state highway's interchange with Interstate 70 (I-70) opened in 1999.

== Route description ==
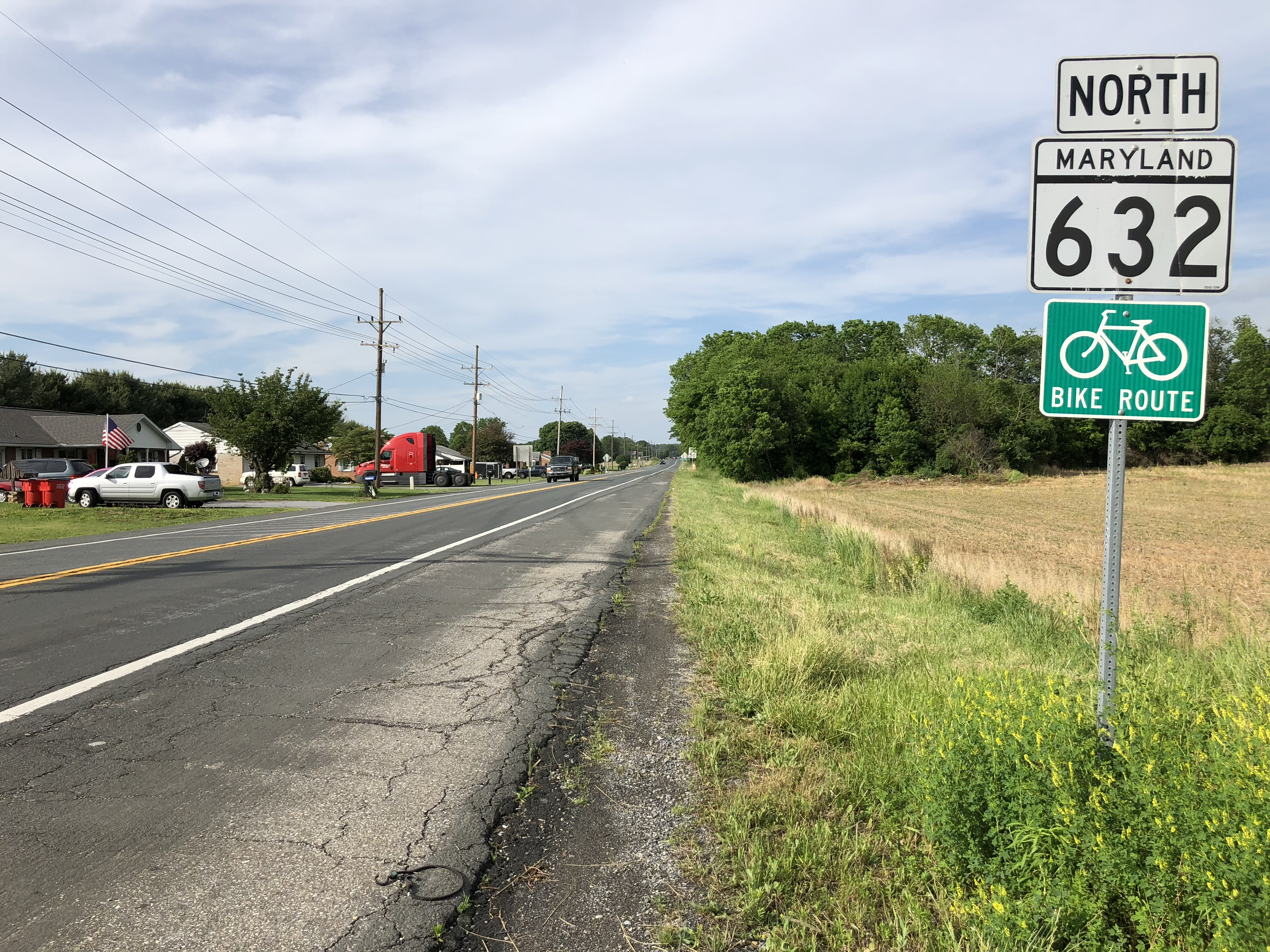
View north along MD 632 at MD 68 near St. James

MD 632 begins at an intersection with MD 63 (Spielman Road) in Downsville. The state highway northeast as a two-lane undivided road through farmland, in the midst of which the highway intersects MD 68 (Lappans Road). MD 632 begins to pass residential subdivisions and industrial properties ahead of its interchange with I-70 (Eisenhower Memorial Highway), through which the state highway is a four-lane divided highway. The intersection with the ramps to and from westbound I-70 is shared with Halfway Boulevard, which heads northwest toward U.S. Route 11 and I-81. A park and ride lot is located west of the road at the interchange just south of Halfway Boulevard and the I-70 westbound ramps. MD 632 reduces to two lanes again and passes through the southeastern part of Halfway before crossing over Norfolk Southern Railway's Hagerstown District line. The state highway turns north to intersect Oak Ridge Drive, enters the city of Hagerstown, and passes through a forested area before reaching its northern terminus at the intersection of Maryland Avenue and Downsville Road between South Hagerstown High School to the east and a pair of shopping centers to the west. The roadway continues north as Maryland Avenue toward downtown Hagerstown, while Downsville Pike heads northeast toward Potomac Street just north of MD 65's northern terminus.

== History ==
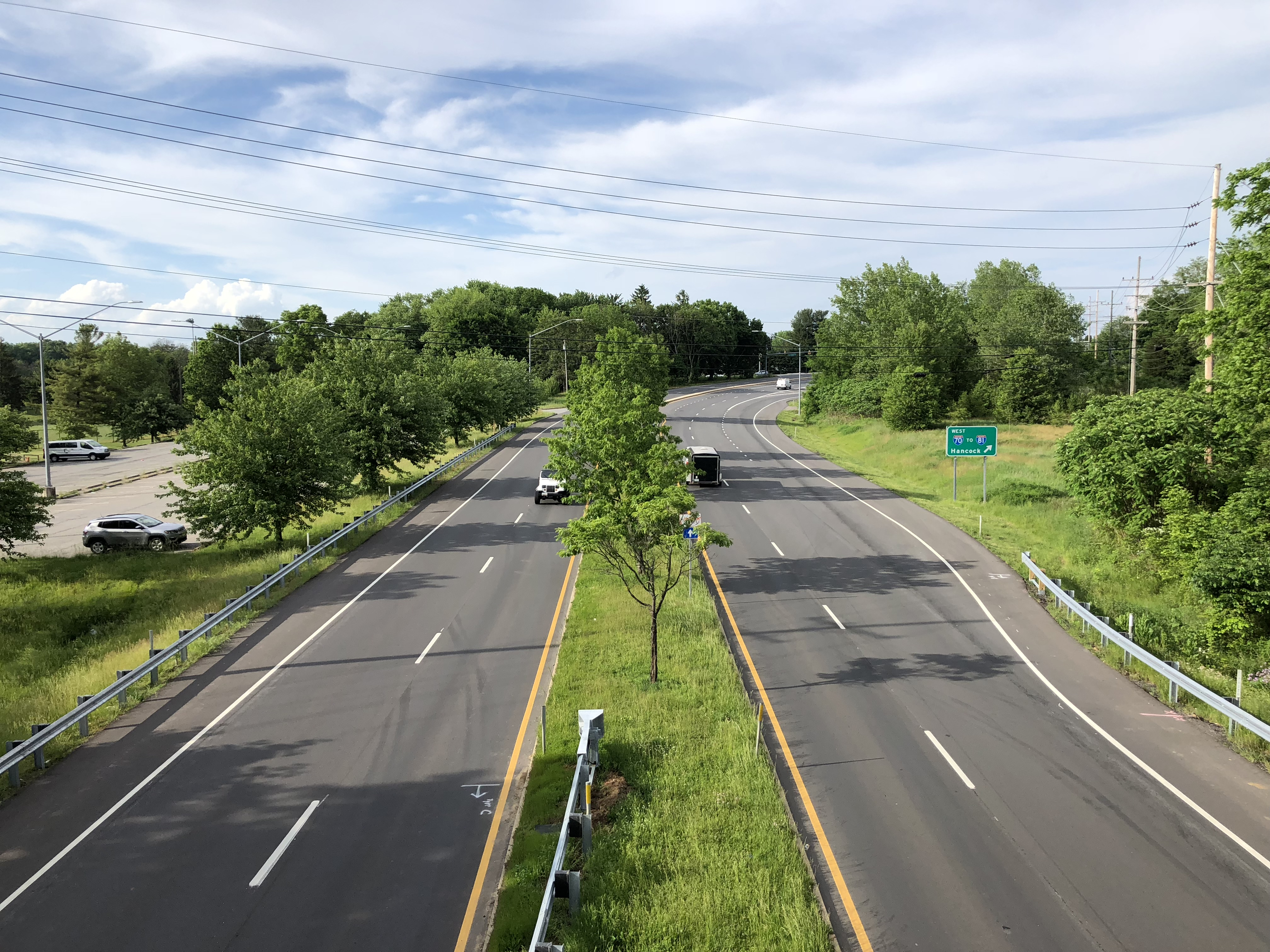
View north along MD 632 from I-70 in Halfway

The predecessor highway of MD 632 was the Downsville and Hagerstown Turnpike from Downsville to the Hagerstown and Sharpsburg Turnpike (now MD 65) in Hagerstown. MD 632 was designated and constructed as a modern highway between 1938 and 1940. The state highway was reconstructed around 1956. The portion of MD 632 around the I-70 overpass was expanded to a four-lane divided highway in 1968 despite no interchange being constructed at that time. The state highway was relocated in Halfway as part of the grade separation of the highway and the Norfolk Southern Railway line in 1978. MD 632's interchange with I-70 was constructed starting in February 1998 and was completed in September 1999.

== Junction list ==
The entire route is in Washington County.

Location	mi	km	Destinations	Notes
Downsville	0.00	0.00	MD 63 (Spielman Road) – Williamsport, Spielman	Southern terminus
St. James	2.24	3.60	MD 68 (Lappans Road) – Williamsport, Boonsboro	
Halfway	4.92	7.92	I-70 (Eisenhower Memorial Highway) – Hancock, Frederick	Exit 28 (I-70)
Hagerstown	6.71	10.80	Maryland Avenue north / Downsville Pike north	Northern terminus
1.000 mi = 1.609 km; 1.000 km = 0.621 mi
