= Lappans, Maryland =

Unincorporated community in Maryland, United States

- Unincorporated community
- Location within Maryland
- Coordinates: 39°33′13″N 77°44′14″W
- Country: United States
- State: Maryland
- County: Washington
- Elevation: 459 ft (140 m)
- Time zone: UTC-5 (Eastern (EST))
  - Summer (DST): UTC-4 (EDT)
- Area codes: 301 & 240
- GNIS feature ID: 590637

Lappans is an unincorporated community in Washington County, Maryland, United States. Lappans is located at the junction of Maryland routes 65 and 68, 6.2 miles (10.0 km) south of Hagerstown. It is the location of St. Mark's Episcopal Church.
