= Downsville =

Downsville is the name of several communities in the United States, including:

- Downsville, Louisiana, a community in Union and Lincoln parishes
- Downsville, Maryland, a community in Washington County
- Downsville, New York, a community in the town of Colchester
- Downsville, Texas, a community in McLennan County
- Downsville, Wisconsin, a community in Dunn County
