= Interstate 70 in Maryland =

Section of Interstate Highway in Maryland

Interstate 70
- I-70 highlighted in red

Route information
- Maintained by MDSHA
- Length: 91.85 mi (147.82 km)
- Existed: 1962–present
- Tourist routes: Historic National Road; Chesapeake and Ohio Canal Scenic Byway
- NHS: Entire route

Major junctions
- West end: I-70 / US 522 at the Pennsylvania state line in Hancock
- I-68 / US 40 / US 522 in Hancock; I-81 near Hagerstown; US 15 / US 340 in Frederick; I-270 / US 40 in Frederick; US 40 near West Friendship; US 29 in Ellicott City
- East end: I-695 / MD 570 in Woodlawn

Location
- Country: United States
- State: Maryland
- Counties: Washington, Frederick, Carroll, Howard, Baltimore

Highway system
- Interstate Highway System; Main; Auxiliary; Suffixed; Business; Future; Maryland highway system; Interstate; US; State; Scenic Byways
← MD 68	→ MD 70
← MD 568	MD 570	→ MD 575

Interstate 70 (I-70) is a part of the Interstate Highway System that runs from Cove Fort, Utah, to Woodlawn just outside of Baltimore, Maryland. In Maryland, the Interstate Highway runs 91.85 miles (147.82 km) from the Pennsylvania state line in Hancock east to the Interstate's eastern terminus at its junction with I-695. I-70 is the primary east–west Interstate in Maryland; the Interstate Highway connects Baltimore—and Washington, D.C., via I-270—with Western Maryland. The Interstate serves Frederick and Hagerstown directly and provides access to Cumberland via its junction with I-68 at Hancock. I-70 runs concurrently with its predecessor highway, U.S. Route 40 (US 40), from Hancock to Indian Springs in Washington County and from Frederick to West Friendship in Howard County.

I-70's route from Frederick to West Friendship was constructed as a divided highway relocation of US 40 in the early to mid-1950s and a freeway bypass of Frederick in the late 1950s. The first section of the Interstate to be marked as I-70 was an upgrade of US 40 near Hancock in the early 1960s. The remainder of the Interstate highway in Maryland west of Frederick was built on a new alignment in the mid- to late 1960s. I-70 was constructed from West Friendship to its present terminus in Baltimore in the late 1960s. The highway from Bartonsville in Frederick County to West Friendship was upgraded to Interstate standards in the mid-1970s. The final non-limited access portion of I-70 between Frederick and Bartonsville was eliminated in the mid-1980s. The Interstate has been upgraded through Frederick in a series of projects that began in the late 1990s.

I-70 was intended to enter Baltimore as an east–west freeway that had been proposed since the 1940s. Around 1960, I-70 was planned passing through a pair of parks and several neighborhoods in West Baltimore to end at an interchange with I-95 and I-83 at the Inner Harbor in Downtown Baltimore. A subsequent proposal based on a review of the 1960 plan moved I-70 to a new alignment that triggered community opposition, which resulted in a new design process in the late 1960s. A new plan was introduced around 1970 that would have moved I-70's eastern terminus to Sowebo (South West Baltimore). Community opposition to the Interstate's planned route through the city parks, however, resulted in I-70 being removed from city plans in the early 1980s.

== Route description ==
I-70 has several official designations along its course through Maryland. The Interstate Highway is designated Eisenhower Memorial Highway from the Pennsylvania state line east to I-270 in Frederick. The highway received this designation from a 1973 act of Congress commemorating the route of the 1919 U.S. Army convoy from Washington, D.C., to San Francisco, California, in which President Dwight D. Eisenhower participated, an ordeal that served as one of his inspirations for the Interstate Highway System. All of I-70 in Frederick County was designated the Korean War Veterans Memorial Highway by the Maryland General Assembly in 2002. Large stone markers featuring reliefs of the Korean Peninsula were erected in the median of I-70 in Myersville and Mount Airy in 2004. Along its concurrency with US 40 from I-270 in Frederick to east of West Friendship, I-70 is known as Baltimore National Pike. The Interstate is unnamed from US 40 near West Friendship to its eastern terminus in Baltimore. Like all mainline Interstates, I-70 is a part of the National Highway System for its entire length.

=== Hancock to Hagerstown ===
Time-lapse video of a trip on the Hancock to Frederick segment of I-70 in 2017

I-70 enters Washington County concurrent with US 522 from Fulton County, Pennsylvania, north of the town of Hancock. Just south of the state line, the four-lane freeway has a full Y interchange with I-68 and US 40, which head west toward Cumberland as the National Freeway. US 40 begins to run concurrently with I-70 just as US 522 leaves I-70 at another full Y interchange through which I-70 curves to the east. US 522 heads south, providing access to downtown Hancock before crossing the Potomac River into West Virginia. I-70 heads east and gains a lane in each direction to climb a ridge that separates the interchanges from the valley of Tonoloway Creek. The third lane eastbound ends at the top of the ridge and the third lane westbound begins just west of the Interstate's partial interchange with Maryland Route 144 (MD 144; Main Street), which lacks a ramp from MD 144 to westbound I-70.

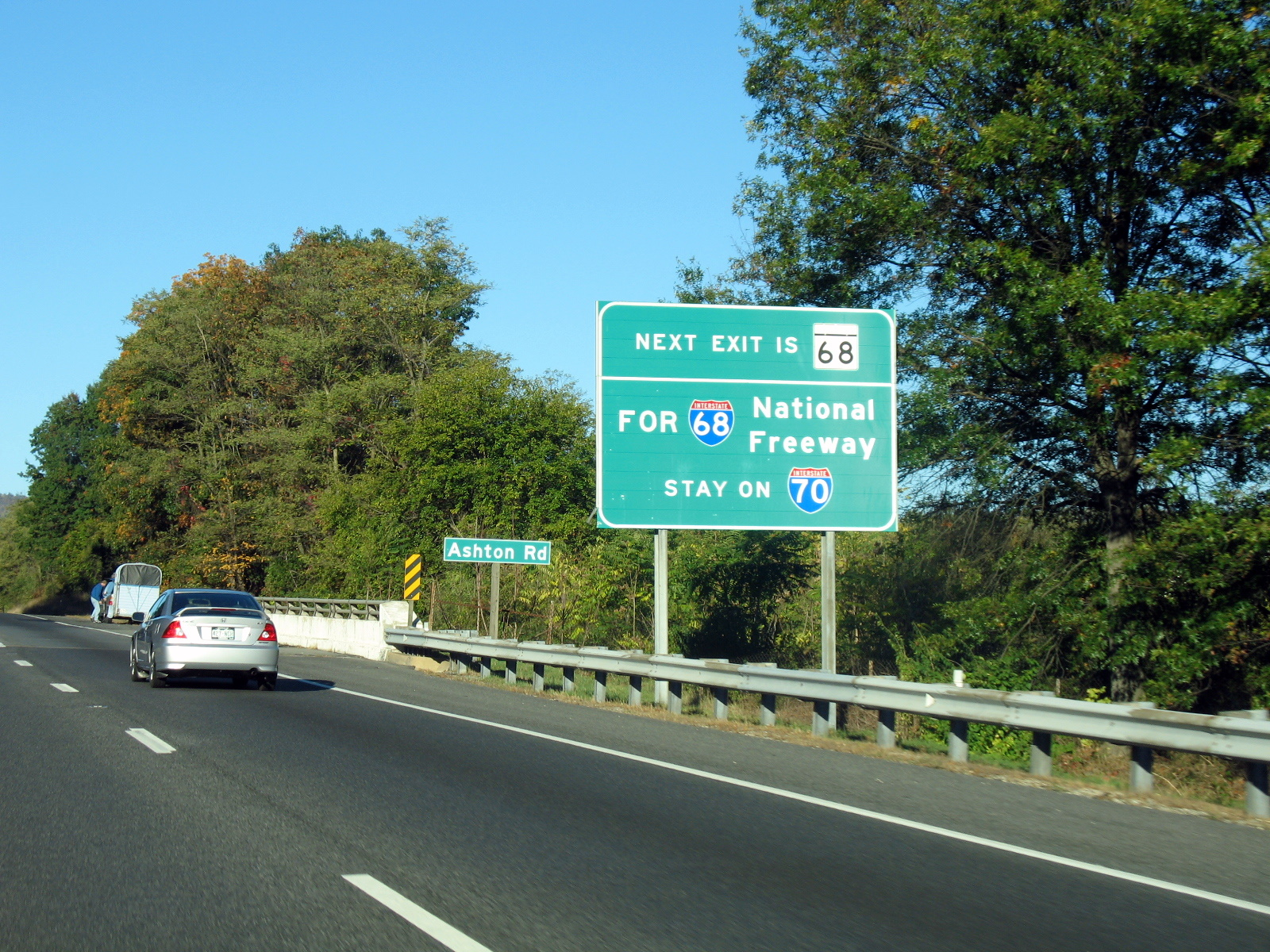
Disambiguation sign posted in advance of the MD 68 interchange on westbound I-70 near Clear Spring

East of MD 144, I-70 parallels the Western Maryland Rail Trail, Chesapeake and Ohio Canal, and Potomac River while heading east along a narrow corridor between the river and several north–south ridges. Within this corridor, the freeway has a pair of partial interchanges with MD 615 (Millstone Road). West of Indian Springs, the valley opens up, and US 40 leaves the Interstate at a partial interchange just west of Licking Creek. I-70 continues to parallel the canal and rail trail at a distance until its diamond interchange with MD 56 (Big Pool Road) at Big Pool, where the freeway curves away from the Potomac River and passes to the south of Stone Quarry Ridge and Boyd Mountain. Just south of Clear Spring, I-70 crosses Toms Run within its diamond interchange with MD 68 (Clear Spring Road). Signs on westbound I-70 prior to the MD 68 interchange remind motorists they should remain on I-70 to access I-68.

I-70 continues east through Hagerstown Valley, where the highway crosses over Little Conococheague, Meadow Brook, and Conococheague creeks before reaching a diamond interchange with MD 63 (Greencastle Pike) south of Huyett. As the Interstate approaches Hagerstown, it crosses a branch of Conococheague Creek and CSX Transportation's Lurgan Subdivision ahead of its cloverleaf interchange with I-81 (Maryland Veterans Memorial Highway). I-70 heads southeast through the interchange, which has collector/distributor lanes in both directions that separate the individual ramps from the main roadways of both Interstates. The freeway traverses US 11 (Virginia Avenue) and the Winchester and Western Railroad before it curves to the east again. The Interstate has partial cloverleaf interchanges with MD 632 (Downsville Pike) and MD 65 (Sharpsburg Pike) around a crossing of Norfolk Southern Railway's Hagerstown District rail line. I-70 crosses over Antietam Creek and US 40 Alternate (US 40 Alt., Boonsboro Pike) south of Funkstown.

=== Hagerstown to Mount Airy ===
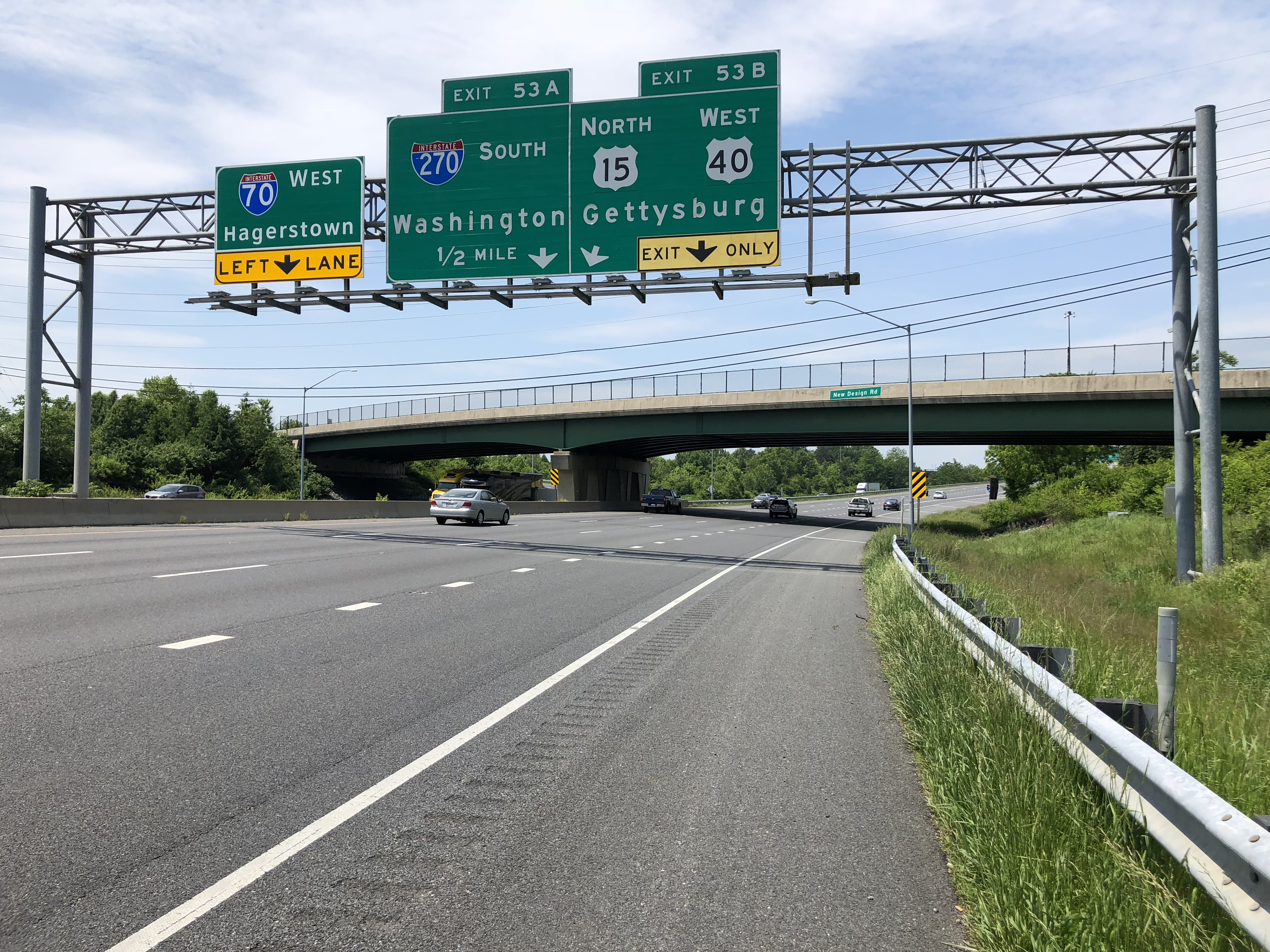
I-70/US 40 westbound approaching its junction with I-270 and US 15 near Frederick, where US 40 splits from I-70

I-70 meets US 40 (National Pike) at a cloverleaf interchange as the two highways leave the suburban area surrounding Hagerstown. The Interstate curves to the southeast and has a diamond interchange with MD 66 (Mapleville Road) near Beaver Creek. I-70 crosses Beaver and Black Rock creeks and gains an eastbound climbing lane as the highway ascends South Mountain and passes through Greenbrier State Park. At the top of the mountain, the Interstate passes under US 40 and the Appalachian Trail and enters Frederick County. I-70 has a pair of rest areas on the east side of the mountain, one per direction. The westbound rest area is where the DC snipers, John Allen Muhammad and Lee Boyd Malvo, were apprehended by police in October 2002.

I-70's eastbound climbing lane disappears and the Interstate has a westbound climbing lane from the top of the mountain southeast to a diamond interchange with MD 17 (Myersville Middletown Road) south of Myersville, where the freeway enters Middletown Valley. Within the valley, the Interstate crosses Catoctin and Little Catoctin creeks. I-70 gains an eastbound climbing lane as it climbs Braddock Mountain, on top of which the freeway passes under a concrete arch bridge carrying Ridge Road. Westbound I-70 has a climbing lane as the highway descends Braddock Mountain and has partial interchanges with US 40 (National Pike) and US 40 Alt. (Old National Pike). The first interchange is a pair of flyover ramps from eastbound I-70 to eastbound US 40 and from westbound US 40 to westbound I-70. The second interchange is a half diamond interchange with an exit ramp from westbound I-70 to US 40 Alt. and an entrance ramp to eastbound I-70.

After entering the Frederick Valley, I-70's speed limit drops from 70 to 65 mph (113 to 105 km/h). The Interstate passes under MD 180 (Jefferson Pike) and has a partial interchange with Jefferson National Pike, a freeway that carries US 15 and US 340; eastbound I-70 has ramps to both eastbound and westbound US 15/US 340, while westbound I-70 has only a flyover ramp to westbound Jefferson National Pike. Eastbound I-70 receives a ramp from MD 180 and Ballenger Creek Pike and crosses over the state highway before reaching a directional interchange with I-270 and US 40. I-270 heads south toward Washington, D.C., as the Eisenhower Memorial Highway, taking over the name from I-70, while US 40 (Frederick Freeway) exits to the north and joins I-70 in a concurrency. I-70 heads east as a six-lane freeway and meets MD 85 (Buckeystown Pike) at a single-point urban interchange (SPUI) south of downtown Frederick. MD 85 is used to access MD 355 (Urbana Pike). The Interstate reduces to four lanes before it crosses over the Frederick Branch of CSX Transportation's Old Main Line Subdivision. On the east side of Frederick, I-70 has a four-ramp partial cloverleaf interchange with South Street and a partial diamond interchange with MD 144 (Patrick Street).

I-70 heads east from the Frederick area as a six-lane freeway with a speed limit of 70 mph (110 km/h). The Interstate crosses over the Monocacy River and Long Spring Branch ahead of a partial interchange with MD 144 (Old National Pike), which includes ramps from westbound I-70 to westbound MD 144 and eastbound MD 144 to eastbound I-70. County-maintained Old National Pike parallels the north side of the Interstate east to Mount Airy via New Market, where I-70 has a diamond interchange with MD 75 (Green Valley Road). East of New Market, the freeway is also paralleled by the Old Main Line Subdivision as the highways and rail line follow the valley of Bush Creek to just west of Mount Airy. I-70 veers southeast for its partial cloverleaf interchange with MD 27 (Ridge Road) at the top of Parr's Ridge on the Frederick–Carroll county line.

=== Mount Airy to Woodlawn ===
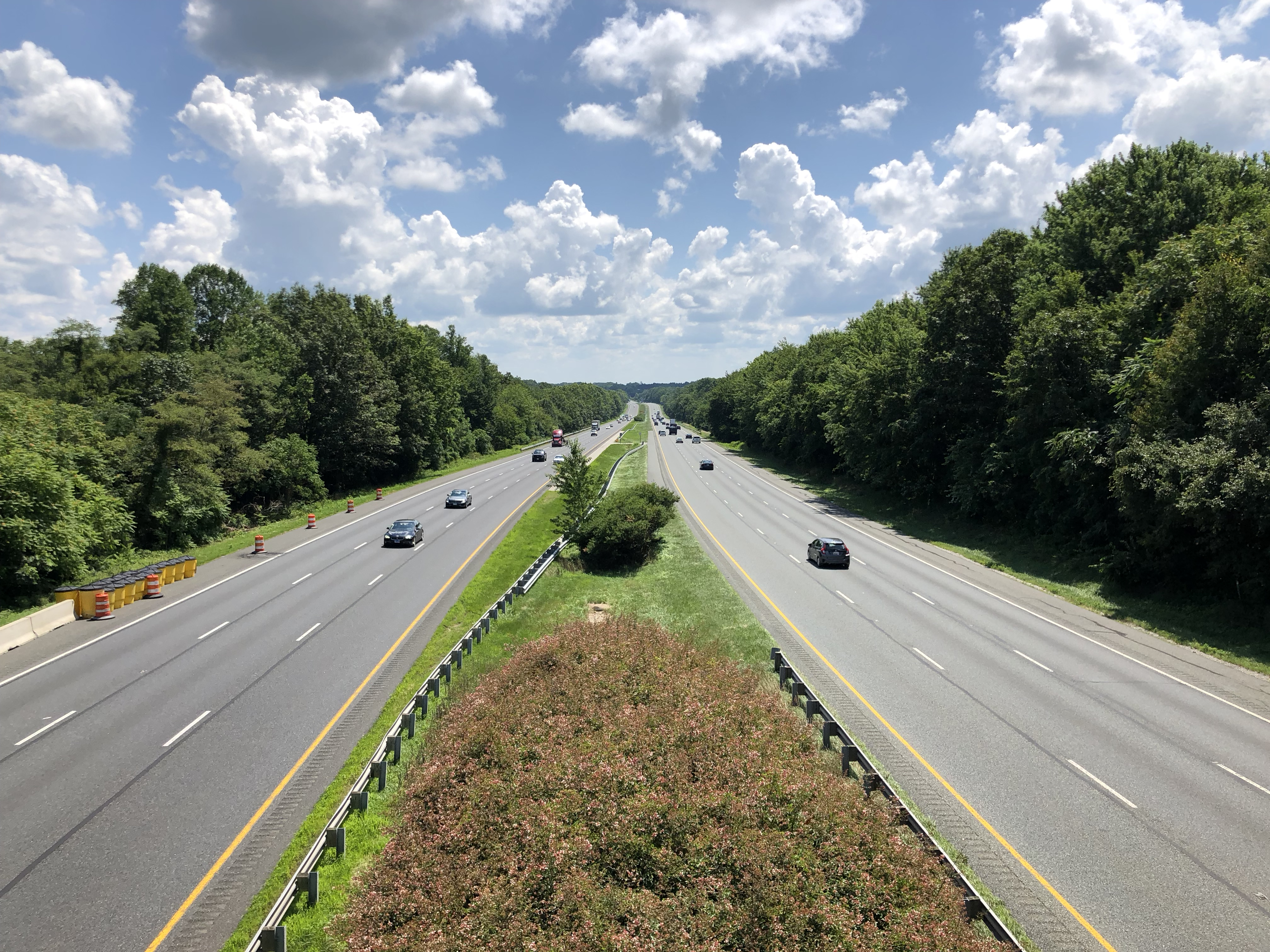
I-70/US 40 in western Howard County

I-70 is closely paralleled by MD 144 (Frederick Road) on its eastbound side as the freeway briefly passes through Carroll County. The Interstate enters Howard County when it traverses the South Branch of the Patapsco River near its headwaters. MD 144 leaves the vicinity of I-70, which meets MD 94 (Woodbine Road) at a diamond interchange in Lisbon and MD 97 (Roxbury Mills Road) at another diamond interchange near Cooksville. East of their diamond interchange with MD 32 (Sykesville Road), I-70 and US 40 split at a partial interchange. I-70 heads east as a four-lane freeway toward Baltimore while US 40 heads east as four-lane Baltimore National Pike to serve Ellicott City. Just east of the US 40 split, the Interstate has a partial interchange with Marriottsville Road that allows westbound I-70 to access US 40.

North of Ellicott City, I-70 has a cloverleaf interchange with US 29 (Columbia Pike) just south of the U.S. Route's northern terminus at MD 99 (Old Frederick Road) and Rogers Avenue, which heads south toward Ellicott City Historic District. The interchange includes a flyover ramp from westbound I-70 to southbound US 29. The Interstate continues east as a six-lane freeway through Patapsco Valley State Park, where the highway crosses the Patapsco River and the Old Main Line Subdivision again and enters Baltimore County. As the freeway approaches the suburb of Woodlawn, the speed limit decreases to 55 mph (89 km/h). The westbound direction has a mileage sign with approximate values for Columbus, Ohio; St. Louis, Missouri; Denver, Colorado; and the small town of Cove Fort, Utah, at the opposite end of I-70. This sign, which was intended as a test of Clearview typeface, was installed in 2004.

=== Woodlawn to Baltimore ===
Maryland Route 570
- Location: Woodlawn–Baltimore
- Length: 1.95 mi (3.14 km)
- Existed: 2014–present

I-70 officially ends at I-695. The 1.95-mile (3.14 km) extension beyond I-695 to the I-70 park-and-ride facility was formally dropped from the Interstate Highway System in August 2014 after approvals from the American Association of State Highway and Transportation Officials (AASHTO) and Federal Highway Administration (FHWA). This stub is now designated Maryland Route 570 (MD 570) but remains signed as I-70. West of the I-695 interchange, I-70 has an average traffic value of 94,221 vehicles. East of the interchange, MD 570 continues as a four-lane highway for local traffic that averages 25,300 vehicles per day. The highway's speed limit reduces to 40 mph (64 km/h) and then 25 mph (40 km/h) as it passes through its final interchange, a partial cloverleaf junction with MD 122 (Security Boulevard), which continues southeast into Baltimore as Cooks Lane. Just east of the MD 122 interchange, MD 570 enters the city of Baltimore and the freeway's median expands into a park-and-ride facility that is accessed at the highways's eastern terminus at a U-turn adjacent to Gwynns Falls/Leakin Park. Eastbound MD 570 traffic that wishes to access Cooks Lane has to make a U-turn at the terminus and exit from a westbound loop ramp. Westbound access to MD 570 is done via a single entrance ramp off Ingleside Avenue, which is considered part of the MD 122 interchange. The very short section of MD 570 in the city of Baltimore is maintained by the Baltimore City Department of Transportation instead of the Maryland State Highway Administration (MDSHA).

== History ==
Interstate 70N
- Location: Frederick–Baltimore
- Existed: 1966–1974

I-70 was planned to follow the US 40 corridor from Hancock east to Frederick, where the Interstate Highway designation split. I-70N would continue following US 40 east to Baltimore while I-70S would follow US 240 southeast toward Washington. In 1974, the suffixed designations were eliminated; I-70N became an eastward extension of I-70 while I-70S was designated I-270.

=== Baltimore National Pike and Frederick Freeway ===
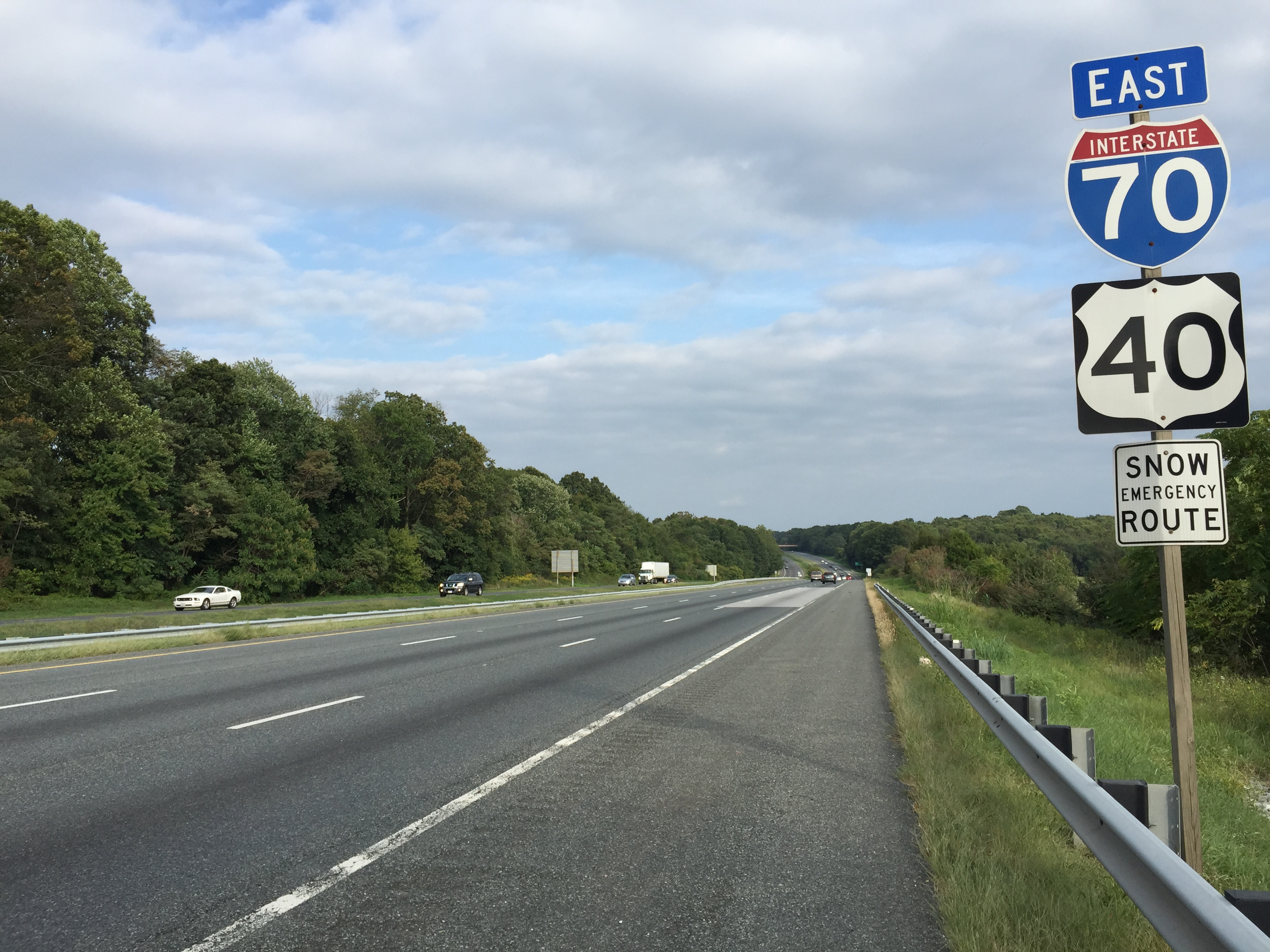
View east along I-70/US 40 (Baltimore National Pike) near Lisbon

The first section of I-70 in Maryland was constructed as Baltimore National Pike, a four-lane divided highway relocation and reconstruction of US 40 from the Pine Orchard community west of Ellicott City west to the east end of Patrick Street in Frederick. US 40 was constructed from Pine Orchard to MD 32 in West Friendship between 1949 and 1951. An overpass of MD 32 and two-way ramp connection between the two highways were constructed in 1951 and 1952. An overpass and connecting ramp were also constructed at MD 97, which was included in the portion of US 40 constructed from West Friendship to Morgan Station Road west of Cooksville between 1950 and 1952. The third section of Baltimore National Pike was built from Morgan Station Road into Carroll County just west of the Patapsco River in 1952 and 1953. The next section of relocated US 40, from west of the Patapsco River through the Ridgeville section of Mount Airy into Frederick County 0.5 miles (0.80 km) west of MD 27, broke ground in 1953 and was completed by 1955. An interchange with MD 27 in Ridgeville was constructed in 1953 and 1954.

The remainder of Baltimore National Pike from Ridgeville to the Monocacy River was constructed in four sections simultaneously starting in 1953. The first three sections were from 0.5 miles (0.80 km) west of the Carroll–Frederick county line to the highway's crossing of the Baltimore and Ohio Railroad's main line at a site called Plane No. 4, from there to New Market, and between New Market and Ijamsville Road in Bartonsville. The fourth section was constructed to closely parallel the existing alignment of US 40 from Ijamsville Road in Bartonsville to just east of the Monocacy River. All four sections opened as a divided highway with a macadam surface in 1955. The following year, Baltimore National Pike from Ridgeville to the Monocacy River was completed with an asphalt surface. The final section of Baltimore National Pike, from east of the Monocacy River to the east end of Patrick Street near modern exit 56, was expanded to a divided highway in 1953 with the exception of the Monocacy River crossing. Engineering work on a second bridge across the Monocacy River began in 1954. The new bridge, which would complement the existing bridge that had been constructed in 1944 to replace the historic Jug Bridge, opened in 1956, completing the Baltimore National Pike.

The western end of Baltimore National Pike was planned to tie into both Patrick Street and the eastern end of the Frederick Freeway, which would serve as a US 40 freeway bypass of downtown Frederick between its two interchanges with Patrick Street. Construction on the east–west US 40 portion of the Frederick Freeway began in 1954 and was completed by 1958. Old US 40 through downtown Frederick later became part of MD 144. The freeway's original interchanges along what is now I-70 included a partial interchange with Patrick Street east of Frederick, the present interchange at South Street, folded diamond interchanges at MD 355 and New Design Road, and a partial interchange with Washington National Pike (now I-270), where the Frederick Freeway curved north to cloverleaf interchanges with US 340 and the western end of Patrick Street. The north–south portion of the Frederick Freeway was completed in 1959 and became part of US 15. The Frederick Freeway was marked with exit numbers in 1963; the portion that is part of I-70 started from exit 1 at MD 144 east of Frederick and went to exit 4 at New Design Road.

=== Interstate construction and upgrades ===
The next section of US 40 and future I-70 to be upgraded was east of Hancock. US 40 was reconstructed as a divided highway from Tonoloway Creek at the eastern end of Hancock parallel to the Potomac River to the community of Millstone at what is now the southern terminus of MD 615 in 1961. This piece of highway became the first completed section of highway in Maryland to be marked as I-70 in 1962. In 1964, construction began on I-70 from the western end of the existing highway to the Pennsylvania state line. This project happened concurrently with the construction of what is now I-68 west from I-70 to MD 144 west of Hancock; both projects were completed in 1966. Construction of I-70 from Hancock to Frederick was fully underway in an eastward direction by 1965. The Interstate opened from MD 615 to MD 56 in 1965; from MD 56 to MD 68 in 1966; from MD 68 to I-81 in 1967; from I-81 to US 40 east of Hagerstown in 1968; and from US 40 to the Frederick Freeway in 1969. When the interchange between the Frederick Freeway and Washington National Pike was reconstructed to add I-70 toward Hagerstown in 1969, the freeway's interchange with New Design Road was removed. Exit numbers were added to I-70 from Hancock to Frederick in 1974.

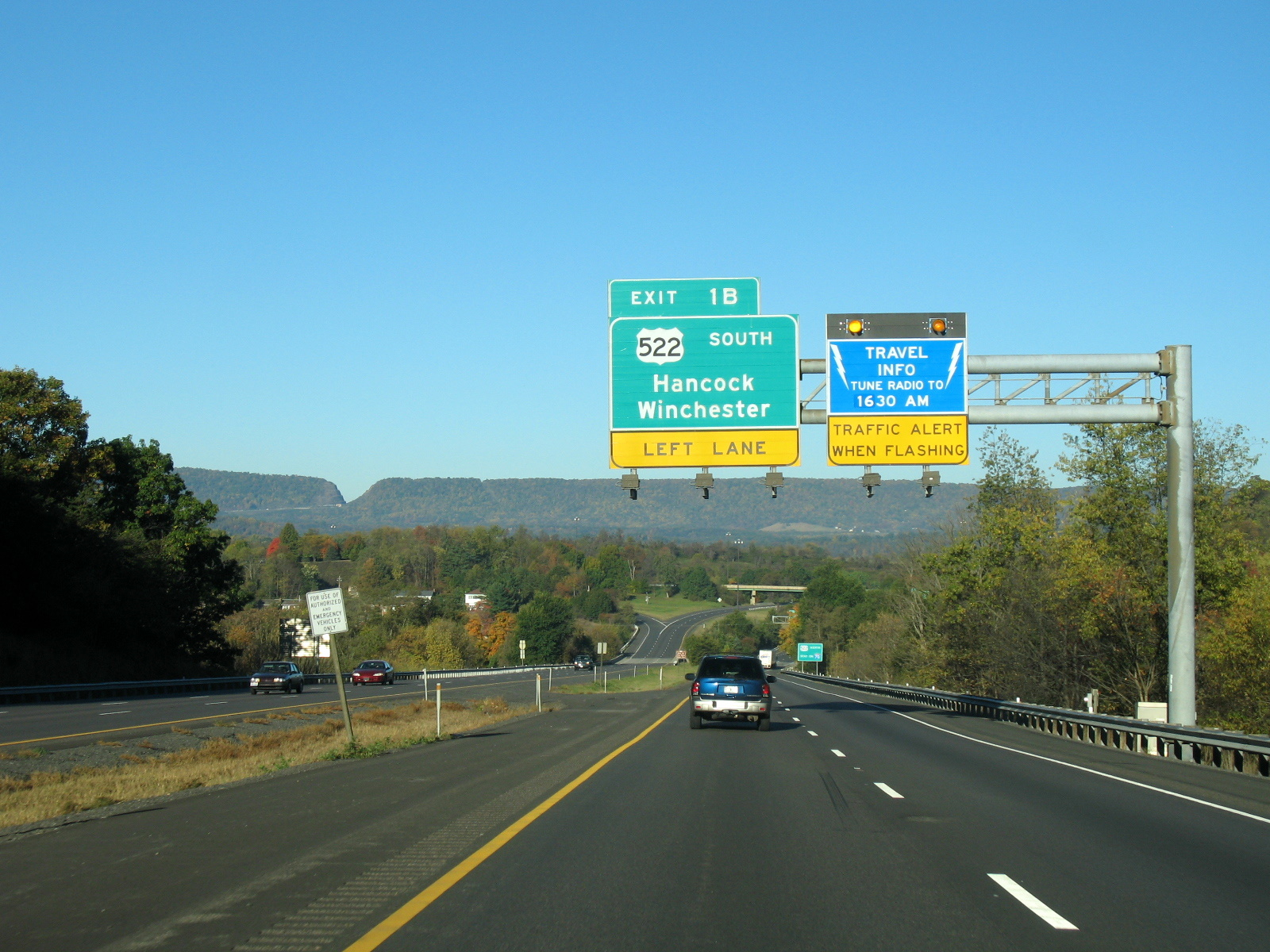
I-70 westbound in Hancock

I-70 was constructed on a new alignment from east of West Friendship to Baltimore. The Interstate opened in 1967 from US 29 to I-695, concurrent with US 29's northward extension from US 40 to MD 99. I-70 opened from US 40 in West Friendship to US 29 and from I-695 to Security Boulevard just west of the Baltimore city line in 1969. I-70 was upgraded to Interstate standards from Bartonsville to West Friendship around 1974. Diamond interchanges were constructed to replace at-grade intersections with MD 94 and MD 75; for the latter interchange, MD 75 was relocated east of New Market. The existing interchanges at MD 32 and MD 97 were converted from two-way connector ramps to diamond interchanges. I-70's interchange with MD 27 was expanded from a four-ramp partial cloverleaf to a six-ramp partial cloverleaf in 1977. Exit numbers were added east of Frederick in 1978; these exit numbers, however, were each 2 less than the present numbers, which were marked in 1983. I-70 was relocated away from the original alignment of US 40 between its junctions with MD 144 in Frederick and Bartonsville around 1987; the old highway became an eastern extension of MD 144. Outside of the reconstruction of the Interstate through Frederick beginning in the 1990s, there have been two interchanges revised or added, both near Hagerstown. A direct ramp was added from eastbound I-70 to southbound MD 65 in 1995; this interchange had four ramps, including two loop ramps with eastbound I-70, from at least 1968. I-70's interchange with MD 632 opened in 1999.

In Washington County, MDSHA reconstructed and widened I-70's bridges over Conococheague Creek starting in mid-2012. The reconstruction of the bridges was completed in July 2014.

In Frederick County, the partial interchange between I 70 and MD 144 in Bartonsville was reconfigured to a full interchange. An exit ramp from Meadow Road to westbound I-70 was completed in October 2019. MD 144 was reconfigured and widened to four lanes from Baltimore Road to just east of Meadow Road in August 2022, and an entry ramp was completed from eastbound I-70 to MD 144. Meadow Road was widened to four lanes from MD 144 to the intersection with westbound I-70 at the same time.

=== Reconstruction through Frederick ===
In 1984, MDSHA completed the I-70 Corridor Planning Study, which examined the 5.3-mile (8.5 km) segment of I-70 from the Mount Philip Road overpass between Braddock Mountain and Frederick to just east of MD 144 at the western end of the project underway to relocate the Interstate through Bartonsville. The study proposed a series of projects to upgrade I-70 through Frederick, much of which had been constructed as the Frederick Freeway in the late 1950s, to Interstate standards. The four-lane freeway was plagued with closely spaced interchanges with substandard acceleration and deceleration lanes and curve radiuses. Many of the interchanges were missing important movements between highways. For instance, travelers aiming to move from southbound US 15 to westbound I-70 needed to use US 40 through Frederick's heavily commercialized Golden Mile to join I-70 at exit 48.

The first project involved I-70's interchange with US 15 and US 340, which was constructed with two ramps, one from westbound I-70 to southbound US 15 and one from northbound US 15 to eastbound I-70, in 1969. In this project completed in 1997, two ramps were added from eastbound I-70 to both directions of US 15; a long ramp was added that started from northbound US 15 and eastbound US 40 at their interchange to provide access to westbound I-70; and a loop ramp from MD 180 and MD 351 (Ballenger Creek Pike) to eastbound I-70 between I-70's interchanges with US 15 and I-270. The second project filled in a pair of missing connections to the I-70/I-270 interchange last updated in 1969. Ramps were added from westbound I-70 to southbound I-270 and from northbound I-270 to eastbound I-70; in addition, New Design Road received a new bridge over I-70 and I-270. After the second project was completed in 2002, traffic between I-70 from the east and I-270 from the south no longer needed to use MD 355 and MD 85 to make the connections.

The third project was the replacement of I-70's interchange with MD 355, a four-ramp partial cloverleaf interchange constructed in 1956. In 2001, westbound I-70's ramps with MD 355 were closed and replaced with temporary ramps to and from Stadium Drive, which connected the freeway with the state highway. In 2005, as part of a related project, the MD 85/MD 355 intersection was reconstructed and MD 85 was extended to a temporary terminus east of MD 355 at a pair of ramps with eastbound I-70. Eastbound I-70's existing ramps at MD 355 were closed. As part of the project, East Street was extended south from downtown Frederick to I-70's SPUI with MD 85, which was completed in 2009. Once the new interchange opened, the temporary ramps between westbound I-70 and Stadium Drive were removed.

The fourth project to upgrade I-70 through Frederick, which will upgrade the interchanges at South Street and MD 144 built in 1956, began in late 2010. Eastbound I-70's ramps with Reichs Ford Road, which leads to South Street, will be reconstructed. The westbound ramps serving South Street will be removed. The missing movements on the eastern end of Frederick will be provided by reconstruction of westbound I-70's ramps with MD 144. A ramp from MD 144 to westbound I-70 will be added; both that ramp and the exit ramp from westbound I-70 will meet MD 144 at a roundabout. Once the interchanges are reconstructed, I-70 will be expanded to six lanes from east of MD 144 to I-270. The fifth and final project to upgrade I-70 through Frederick will expand I-70 to six lanes between Mount Philip Road and I-270.

== Future ==
In Howard County, as part of the upgrade of MD 32 to a freeway from MD 108 to I-70, the state highway's junction with I-70 will be reconstructed from a diamond interchange to a partial cloverleaf design that will allow free-flowing traffic from both directions of MD 32 onto I-70. In Howard County, a study is underway concerning improvements to the portion of I-70 between MD 32 and US 29; between the US 40 split and US 29, I-70 is only four lanes. The study will look at widening the Interstate to six or eight lanes as well as possible improvements on US 29 and Marriottsville Road at their respective interchanges with I-70. In Baltimore and Howard counties, a study is underway in consideration of widening I-70 between I-695 and US 29 to eight or possibly 10 lanes. This would require the reconstruction of the bridges over the Patapsco River in both directions in order to accommodate more lanes.

A proposal has been made to replace the interchange at I-695 with the goal of improving mobility and reducing congestion and delays. The interchange, built in the 1960s, currently handles significantly more traffic than it was originally designed for, resulting in frequent traffic congestion in the area. The proposal, named Triple Bridges, is currently in the planning phase, and is scheduled to start the design–build phase in 2027.

== Highway in Baltimore ==
=== Early freeway plans for Baltimore ===
Nine plans for a Baltimore city freeway system were put together by Baltimore city planners between 1942 and 1957. The most influential of these plans was portrayed in the Smith Report of 1945, which heavily influenced future proposals, including the proposal that would be included in the General Location of National System of Interstate Highways, also known as the Yellow Book, in 1955. None of the plans gained traction due to either decision makers figuring the freeways were not needed or opposition to the east–west freeway passing straight through the central business district (CBD) or immediately to the north of the CBD. For instance, a 1957 proposal had the east–west freeway following Biddle Street through the northern part of Downtown Baltimore.

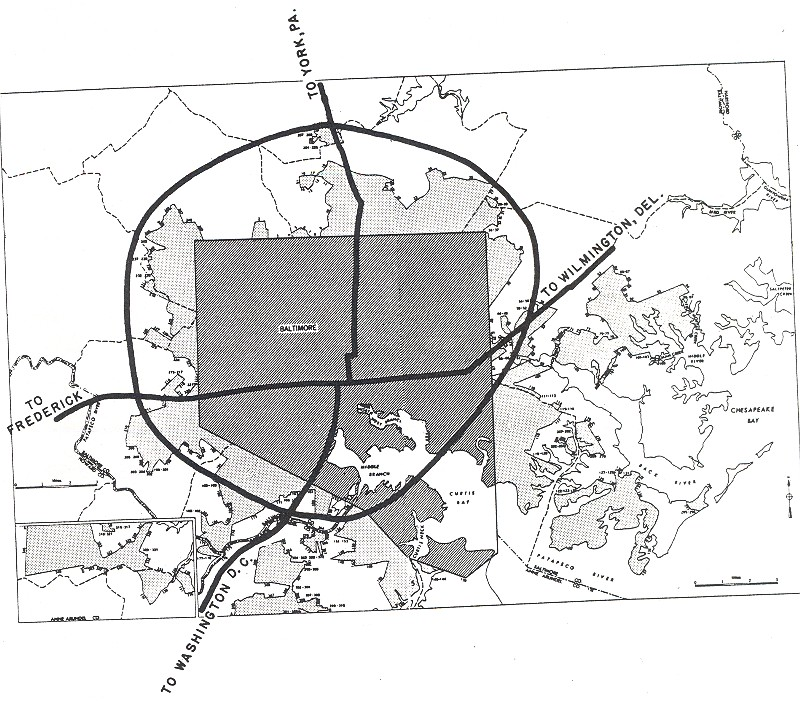
Planning map for the Baltimore freeways from the 1955 Yellow Book

By the late 1950s, however, Baltimore was starting to suffer from the flight of its commercial and industrial concerns and residents to the suburbs in response to the easy access provided by the developing Baltimore Beltway. In response to the new sense of urgency, the head of Baltimore's Department of Planning, Philip Darling, put together a 1960 report titled A Study for an East–West Expressway. Darling proposed I-70N pass through Gwynns Falls/Leakin Park and the Rosemont neighborhood and head east between Franklin and Mulberry streets. The East–West Expressway would turn south near Pine Street and turn east again to follow an elevated highway just south of Pratt Street, between the CBD and Inner Harbor. At the east end of the Inner Harbor, at approximately the modern intersection of President Street and Eastern Avenue, I-70N would reach its terminus at a four-way interchange with I-83 (Jones Falls Expressway) and I-95 (Southwestern Expressway). I-95 would cross the Inner Harbor on a 50-foot-high (15 m) bridge immediately to the southwest of the interchange.

=== The 10-D and 3-A systems ===
Darling's outreach with various civic groups meant there was little opposition to the proposed route of the East–West Expressway. The last obstacle before the freeway could receive federal funding was a review by independent consultants. A group of three consulting firms that came together as Expressway Consultants reviewed Darling's plan and made major changes without consulting the civic groups Darling had engaged. As a result, when the consultants released their 10-D System in 1962, the plan faced widespread opposition. In the 10-D System, I-70N would follow roughly the same route as in the Darling Plan east to Fremont Avenue. There, the freeway would follow Fremont Avenue south to a junction with I-95 at Hamburg Street. The route of the East–West Expressway in the 10-D System would require condemning a greater number of properties compared to Darling's plan due to I-70N and I-95 passing through several residential neighborhoods south of the CBD. Several of the civic groups with which Darling had compromised opposed Expressway Consultants's uncompromising position toward their route through Leakin Park.

Despite the major opposition, the initiation of federal funding allowed the city to start acquiring property in the Franklin–Mulberry corridor in 1966 to clear the way for construction of the stretch of freeway that did get built between Pulaski Street and Martin Luther King Jr. Boulevard. That same year, the city of Baltimore decided to resolve the deadlock on the 10-D System by forming another consulting group, Urban Design Concept Associates, to work with various experts and stakeholders to come up with a new, less disruptive freeway system proposal for Baltimore. In 1969, the city adopted the group's proposal for the 3-A System. I-70N would pass through Gwynns Falls/Leakin Park, then follow Gwynns Falls south to an interchange with the modern alignment of I-95 east of Caton Avenue. Another freeway, later designated I-170, would be constructed in the Franklin–Mulberry corridor to connect I-70 with the west side of the CBD.

Many of the civic groups, however, still opposed I-70 passing through Gwynns Falls/Leakin Park; the groups used litigation and political will to indefinitely delay the construction of I-70 through the park. In 1981, the city canceled the portion of I-70 from its current eastern terminus through Gwynns Falls/Leakin Park to the Interstate's interchange with I-170. I-170 and the portion of proposed freeway south to I-95 remained part of plans with a new designation for the L-shaped freeway, I-595. In 1983, however, I-595 was canceled as well due to escalating costs; saving funds for the original I-595 freeway would detract from more pressing needs like maintenance of city streets and rapid transit. I-595 was later used as an unsigned designation for the upgrade of US 50 between the Capital Beltway and Annapolis. With the abandonment of I-70's extension further into the city, the Baltimore City Department of Transportation converted the Interstate's stub end east of Security Boulevard (MD 122) into a park-and-ride facility that opened in September 1985. At the once-planned I-95 interchange, a flyover ramp that was to become the ramp from eastbound I-70 to southbound I-95 was demolished in 1997, though several other ramp stubs remain in place.

=== Route description of I-70 in the 3-A System ===
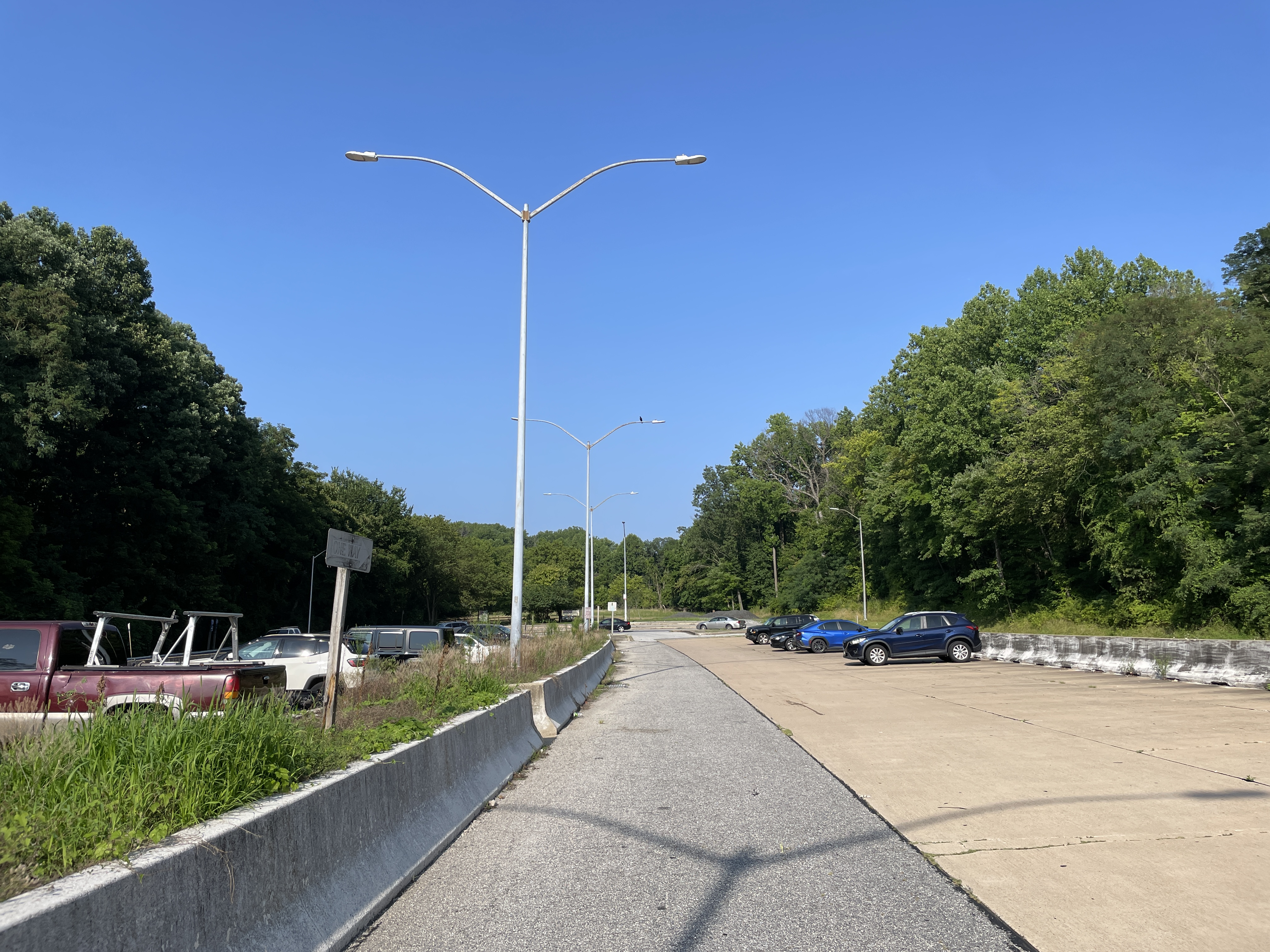
Eastern terminus of MD 570 (former I-70) at park and ride lot in Baltimore

Had I-70 been constructed as planned in the 3-A System, I-70 would have continued east from its former terminus at the Baltimore city limits near Security Boulevard. The Interstate would curve to the northeast and traverse Dead Run and Franklintown Road, then pass through a short tunnel underneath a hill in Leakin Park. I-70 would curve east through Gwynns Falls Park, where the freeway would cross over Dead Run and Franklintown Road again just south of the stream's confluence with Gwynns Falls. The Interstate would parallel Gwynns Falls southeast to an interchange with Hilton Parkway, a four-lane divided highway that connects the portions of Hilton Street on either side of the Gwynns Falls valley. The directional T interchange would provide access from both directions of I-70 to northbound Hilton Parkway and from southbound Hilton Parkway to I-70. I-70 would continue south while paralleling Hilton Parkway on the east until the freeway's underpass of US 40 (Edmondson Avenue).

I-70 would have continued southeast along Gwynns Falls and what is now CSX Transportation's Hanover Subdivision. The Interstate would have met the western end of I-170 at a directional T interchange where Baltimore Street and Amtrak's Northeast Corridor cross over Gwynns Falls. I-170 would have headed northeast closely paralleling the Amtrak Northeast Corridor before veering east at West Baltimore station on MARC Train's Penn Line to join the constructed portion of I-170, which is now part of US 40. I-70 would have continued southeast to a partial interchange with MD 144 (Frederick Avenue) that would have allowed access to and from the direction of I-95. The Interstate would have passed under US 1 (Wilkens Avenue) before reaching its terminus at I-95. I-70's junction with I-95 would have been a directional T interchange constructed over a rail yard on the Mount Clare Branch of CSX Transportation's Baltimore Terminal Subdivision. When I-95 was completed from Caton Avenue to Russell Street in February 1978, the highway was paralleled by extended ramps east from the Caton Avenue interchange that would have allowed connections between I-70 and Caton Avenue (US 1 Alt.) and segregated I-70 and Caton Avenue traffic from the partial interchange with Washington Boulevard just to the east.

== Exit list ==
County	Location	mi	km	Exit	Destinations	Notes
Washington	Hancock	0.00	0.00		I-70 west / US 522 north – Breezewood	Continuation into Pennsylvania
Washington	Hancock	0.63– 1.16	1.01– 1.87	1	I-68 west / US 40 west / US 522 south – Cumberland, Hancock, Winchester	Western end of US 40 concurrency; eastern end of US 522 concurrency; signed as exits 1A (west) and 1B (south)
Washington	Hancock	3.51	5.65	3	MD 144 west / Historic National Road / C&O Canal Scenic Byway – Hancock	Left exit westbound; no westbound entrance
Washington		4.41	7.10	5	MD 615 (Millstone Road)	Eastbound exit and westbound entrance
Washington		5.86	9.43	5	MD 615 north (Millstone Road)	Westbound exit and eastbound entrance
Washington	Pecktonville	9.18	14.77	9	US 40 east / Historic National Road – Indian Springs	Eastbound exit and westbound entrance; eastern end of US 40 concurrency
Washington	Big Pool	11.97	19.26	12	MD 56 (Big Pool Road) / C&O Canal Scenic Byway – Big Pool, Indian Springs	
Washington	Clear Spring	17.62	28.36	18	MD 68 (Clear Spring Road) – Clear Spring	
Washington	Wilson-Conococheague	24.11	38.80	24	MD 63 (Greencastle Pike) – Williamsport, Huyett	
Washington	Halfway	25.72	41.39	26	I-81 – Roanoke, Harrisburg	Exits 4A-B on I-81
Washington	Halfway	27.75	44.66	28	MD 632 (Downsville Pike) – Hagerstown, Downsville	
Washington	Hagerstown	29.10	46.83	29	MD 65 (Sharpsburg Pike) – Sharpsburg, Hagerstown	Signed as exits 29A (south) and 29B (north) eastbound
Washington	Hagerstown	31.68	50.98	32	US 40 (National Pike) – Hagerstown	Signed as exits 32A (east) and 32B (west)
Washington	Mount Aetna	34.27	55.15	35	MD 66 (Mapleville Road) – Smithsburg, Boonsboro	
Frederick	Myersville	41.92	67.46	42	MD 17 (Myersville Middletown Road) – Myersville, Middletown	
Frederick	Braddock Heights	48.79	78.52	48	US 40 east (Baltimore National Pike) – Frederick	Eastbound exit and westbound entrance
Frederick	Braddock Heights	49.07	78.97	49	US 40 Alt. (Old National Pike) – Braddock Heights, Middletown	Westbound exit and eastbound entrance
Frederick	Frederick	52.09	83.83	52	US 15 / US 340 – Charles Town, Leesburg, Gettysburg	Signed as exits 52A (south) and 52B (north) eastbound; no westbound access to US 15 north/US 340 east
Frederick	Frederick	52.98	85.26	53	I-270 south / US 40 west to US 15 north – Washington, Gettysburg	Signed as exits 53A (south) and 53B (west) westbound; no eastbound access to US 40; western end of US 40 concurrency
Frederick	Frederick	54.14	87.13	54	MD 85 (Buckeystown Pike) to MD 355 (Urbana Pike) – Buckeystown	Single-point urban interchange
Frederick	Frederick	54.69	88.02	55	South Street	
Frederick	Frederick	55.22	88.87	56	MD 144 (Patrick Street)	Westbound entrance accessible by police vehicles only
Frederick	Bartonsville	58.58	94.28	59	MD 144 west (Old National Pike) – Linganore, Ijamsville	
Frederick	New Market	62.29	100.25	62	MD 75 (Green Valley Road) – Libertytown, Hyattstown	
Carroll	Mount Airy	67.73	109.00	68	MD 27 (Ridge Road) – Damascus, Mount Airy	
Howard	Lisbon	73.12	117.68	73	MD 94 (Woodbine Road) – Woodbine, Lisbon	
Howard	Cooksville	76.29	122.78	76	MD 97 (Hoods Mill Road) – Westminster, Olney	
Howard	West Friendship	79.96	128.68	80	MD 32 (Sykesville Road) – Clarksville, Sykesville	
Howard	West Friendship	82.08	132.09	82	US 40 east (Baltimore National Pike) – Ellicott City	Eastbound exit and westbound entrance; eastern end of US 40 concurrency
Howard	West Friendship	82.90	133.41	83	Marriottsville Road	Westbound exit and eastbound entrance
Howard	Ellicott City	86.99	140.00	87	US 29 (Columbia Pike) to MD 99 – Columbia, Washington	Signed as exits 87A (south) and 87B (north); exits 25A-B on US 29
Baltimore	Woodlawn	91.67	147.53	91	I-695 (Baltimore Beltway) to I-95 – Glen Burnie, Towson, Baltimore, New York	Stack interchange; signed as exits 91A (south) and 91B (north); exits 16A–B on I-695
Baltimore	Woodlawn	91.67	147.53	I-70 becomes MD 570		
Baltimore County–Baltimore City line	Woodlawn–Baltimore line	93.44	150.38	94	Security Boulevard (MD 122 west) / Cooks Lane	Exit number not signed westbound
Baltimore County–Baltimore City line	Woodlawn–Baltimore line	93.62	150.67		Park and Ride	Eastern terminus of MD 570
1.000 mi = 1.609 km; 1.000 km = 0.621 mi: Concurrency terminus; Incomplete access; Route transition

== Auxiliary routes ==
I-70 has two auxiliary Interstate Highways in Maryland.

=== Interstate 270 ===
Interstate 270
- Location: Bethesda–Frederick
- Length: 34.70 mi (55.84 km)
- Existed: 1975–present

Interstate 270 (I-270) is a 34.70-mile (55.84 km) auxiliary Interstate Highway in the U.S. state of Maryland that travels between I-495 (Capital Beltway) just north of Bethesda in Montgomery County and I-70/US 40 in the city of Frederick in Frederick County. It consists of the 32.60-mile (52.46 km) mainline as well as a 2.10-mile (3.38 km) spur that provides access to and from southbound I-495. I-270 is known as the Dwight D. Eisenhower Memorial Highway as well as the Washington National Pike. Most of the southern part of the route in Montgomery County passes through suburban areas around Rockville and Gaithersburg that are home to many biotech firms. This portion of I-270 is up to 12 lanes wide and consists of a local–express lane configuration as well as HOV lanes that are in operation during peak travel times. North of the Gaithersburg area, the road continues through the northern part of Montgomery County, passing Germantown and Clarksburg as a six- to eight-lane highway with an HOV lane in the northbound direction only. North of here, I-270 continues through rural areas into Frederick County and toward the city of Frederick as a four-lane freeway.

=== Interstate 370 ===
Interstate 370
- Location: Gaithersburg
- Length: 2.54 mi (4.09 km)
- Existed: 1988–present

Interstate 370 (I-370) is a 2.54-mile (4.09 km) auxiliary Interstate Highway that spurs off I-270 in Gaithersburg to the western end of MD 200 (Intercounty Connector) at an interchange that provides access to the park-and-ride lot at Shady Grove station on the Red Line of the Washington Metro. Despite the number, I-370 does not connect to I-70 itself. The road continues to the west of I-270 as Sam Eig Highway, a surface road. Along the way, I-370 has interchanges with MD 355 and Shady Grove Road. The freeway was completed in the late 1980s to connect I-270 to Shady Grove station. I-370 was part of the larger Intercounty Connector but was the only segment to be built at the time. MD 200 east of I-370 to MD 28 (Norbeck Road) opened on February 23, 2011, resulting in the truncation of I-370 to the interchange with MD 200 and the redesignation of the road leading into the Shady Grove Metro station as MD 200A.

== See also ==
Interstate 70
Previous state: Pennsylvania	Maryland	Next state: Terminus
