= Big Spring, Maryland =

Unincorporated community in Maryland, United States

- Unincorporated community
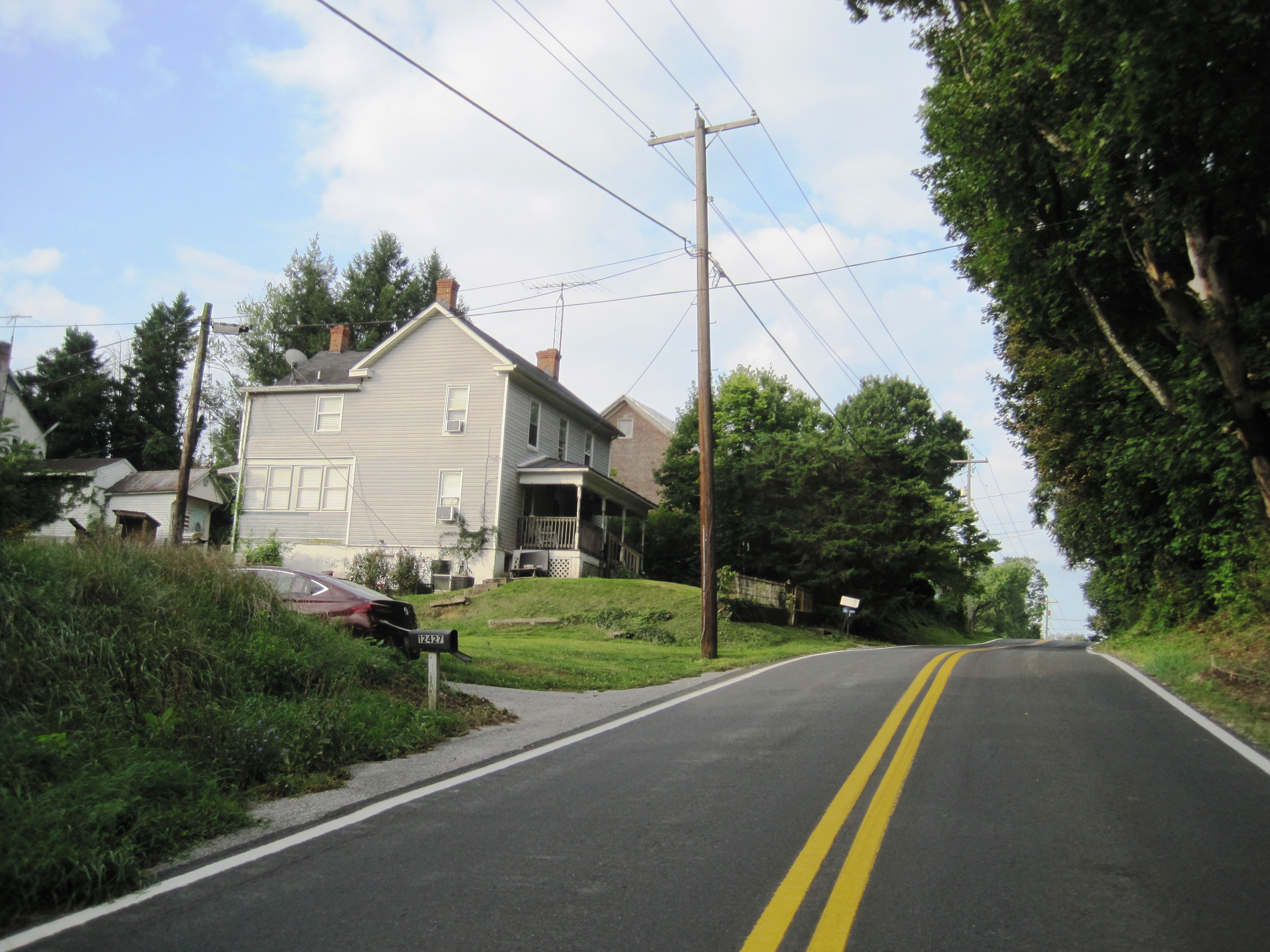
- Westbound MD 56 in Big Spring

- Location within Maryland Location within the United States
- Coordinates: 39°37′28″N 77°56′19″W
- Country: United States
- State: Maryland
- County: Washington

Area
  - Total: 0.14 sq mi (0.36 km^{2})
  - Land: 0.14 sq mi (0.36 km^{2})
  - Water: 0 sq mi (0.00 km^{2})
- Elevation: 410 ft (120 m)

Population (2020)
  - Total: 85
  - Density: 611.3/sq mi (236.04/km^{2})
- Time zone: UTC−5 (Eastern (EST))
  - Summer (DST): UTC−4 (EDT)
- ZIP code: 21722
- Area codes: 240 & 301
- GNIS feature ID: 2583584

Big Spring is an unincorporated community and census-designated place in Washington County, Maryland, United States. Its population was 84 as of the 2010 census. Maryland Route 56 passes through the community.

== Geography ==
According to the U.S. Census Bureau, the community has an area of 0.139 square miles (0.36 km^{2}), all land.

== Demographics ==
Historical population
| Census | Pop. | Note | %± |
|---|---|---|---|
| 2020 | 85 | | — |
U.S. Decennial Census
