= Maryland Route 615 =

Highway in Maryland

Maryland Route 615
- Maryland Route 615 highlighted in red

Route information
- Maintained by MDSHA
- Length: 4.35 mi (7.00 km)
- Existed: 1936–present

Major junctions
- South end: I-70 / US 40 east of Hancock
- North end: SR 2001 at the Pennsylvania state line

Location
- Country: United States
- State: Maryland
- Counties: Washington

Highway system
- Maryland highway system; Interstate; US; State; Scenic Byways
← MD 614	→ MD 617

Maryland Route 615 (MD 615) is a state highway in the U.S. state of Maryland. The state highway runs 4.35 miles (7.00 km) from Interstate 70 (I-70) and U.S. Route 40 (US 40) east of Hancock north to the Pennsylvania state line, where the highway continues as State Route 2001 (SR 2001) in Fulton County. MD 615 has two sections, an east–west section that closely parallels I-70 and US 40 and a north–south highway that follows Heavenly Acres Ridge. The ridge road was constructed as MD 615 in the mid-1930s. The east–west segment is part of the original alignment of US 40 constructed in the mid-1910s. After I-70 was constructed east of Hancock in the early 1960s, MD 615 was extended to its current length parallel to the new freeway.

== Route description ==
MD 615 begins at an intersection between Millstone Road, which continues east as a county highway, and the Exit 5 ramp from westbound I-70 and US 40 (Eisenhower Memorial Highway). The state highway heads west as a two-lane undivided road, closely paralleling I-70 and US 40 to the south. At Hollow Road, MD 615 has a ramp to eastbound I-70 and US 40; the ramp also provides access to a parking lot for the Western Maryland Rail Trail and Chesapeake and Ohio Canal National Historical Park. The highway continues west until it intersects the ramps to and from I-70 and US 40 in the direction of Hancock. MD 615's name changes to Heavenly Acres Ridge Road and curves north to climb out of the narrow valley of the Potomac River onto Heavenly Acres Ridge. The highway follows the ridge north to its terminus at an intersection with White Oak Ridge Road at the Pennsylvania state line. Heavenly Acres Ridge Road continues north as SR 2001 in southeastern Fulton County.

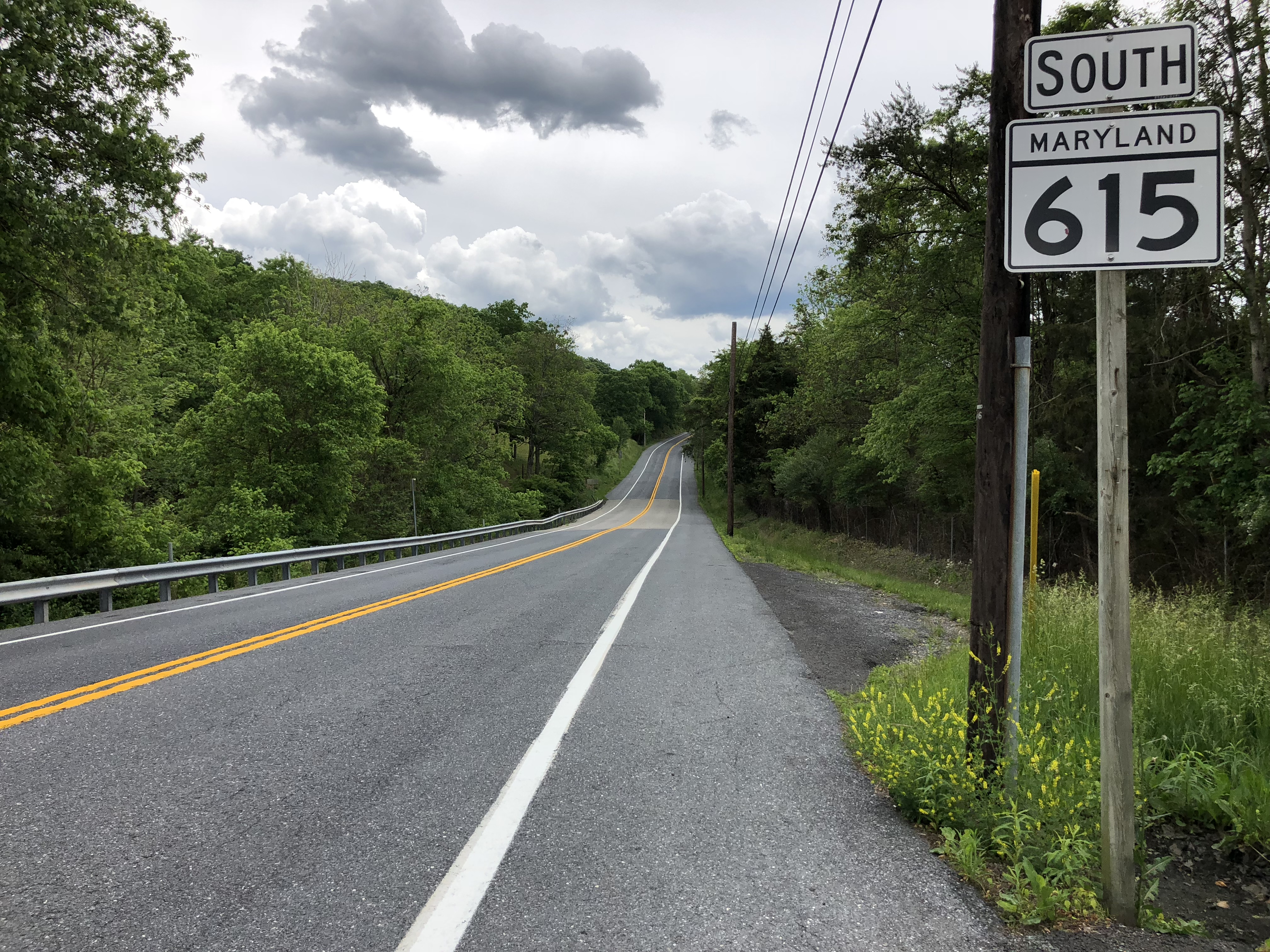
View south along MD 615 at Hollow Road in Millstone

== History ==
The Millstone Road portion of MD 615 follows a narrow corridor on the north side of the Potomac River that has carried multiple modes of transportation between Hancock and Licking Creek, where the river valley opens up. In the early 20th century, this corridor featured the Chesapeake and Ohio Canal, the Western Maryland Railway, and the National Pike, which ran between the canal and the railroad. When the Maryland State Roads Commission constructed the state road between Hancock and Licking Creek in 1915, the highway was placed on a new alignment north of the railroad tracks to eliminate four grade crossings. This highway was designated US 40 in 1927. The Heavenly Acres Ridge portion of MD 615 was paved from US 40 to the Pennsylvania state line in 1936. By 1939, White Oak Ridge Road was also marked as MD 615. White Oak Ridge Road retained the state highway designation until 1956. In 1960, US 40 was constructed parallel to its existing alignment as a freeway from the east end of Main Street in Hancock to what is now the eastern end of MD 615. This upgrade included the modern ramps between the freeway and Millstone Road. This freeway was marked as I-70 in addition to US 40 in 1962 and MD 615 was extended south and east from Heavenly Acres Ridge Road along its modern extent.

== Junction list ==
The entire route is in a sparsely populated area east of Hancock in Washington County.

mi	km	Destinations	Notes
0.00	0.00	Millstone Road east	Exit 5 ramp from westbound I-70 / US 40; southern terminus
0.39	0.63	I-70 east / US 40 east (Eisenhower Memorial Highway) / Hollow Road north – Hagerstown	Exit 5 ramp to eastbound I-70 / US 40
1.83	2.95	I-70 west / US 40 west (Eisenhower Memorial Highway) – Hancock	Exit 5 ramps from eastbound I-70 / US 40 and to westbound I-70 / US 40
4.35	7.00	SR 2001 north (Heavenly Acres Ridge Road) / White Oak Ridge Road south	Pennsylvania state line; northern terminus
1.000 mi = 1.609 km; 1.000 km = 0.621 mi
