= Maryland Route 56 =

State highway in Washington County, Maryland, US, known as Big Pool Rd

Maryland Route 56
- Big Pool Road
- Maryland Route 56 highlighted in red

Route information
- Maintained by MDSHA
- Length: 8.08 mi (13.00 km)
- Existed: 1927–present
- Tourist routes: Chesapeake and Ohio Canal Scenic Byway; Historic National Road Scenic Byway

Major junctions
- West end: I-70 in Big Pool
- East end: MD 68 near Pinesburg

Location
- Country: United States
- State: Maryland
- Counties: Washington

Highway system
- Maryland highway system; Interstate; US; State; Scenic Byways
← MD 55	→ MD 57

Maryland Route 56 (MD 56) is a state highway in the U.S. state of Maryland. Known as Big Pool Road, the state highway runs 8.08 miles (13.00 km) from Interstate 70 (I-70) in Big Pool east to MD 68 near Pinesburg in western Washington County. MD 56, which features a pair of one-lane bridges, provides access to Fort Frederick State Park and the eastern trailhead of the Western Maryland Rail Trail. The state highway was first constructed in the mid 1910s from what is now U.S. Route 40 (US 40) south to Big Pool. The highway was extended east toward the village of Big Spring in the early 1930s and to MD 68 in the late 1950s. MD 56 was truncated at I-70 in the mid-1990s.

== Route description ==
MD 56 begins at the westbound I-70 ramps of Exit 12. Big Pool Road continues as a county highway north for 1.38 miles (2.22 km) to an intersection with US 40 (National Pike) in Indian Springs. The state highway crosses I-70 (Eisenhower Memorial Highway), intersects the eastbound ramps of the diamond interchange, then curves southeast as a two-lane undivided road into the village of Big Pool, where the highway passes the eastern trailhead for the Western Maryland Rail Trail. The rail trail is adjacent to CSX's Lurgan Subdivision railroad line, which in turn is adjacent to the Big Pool, a reservoir that was part of the Chesapeake and Ohio Canal and is now used for recreation as part of Chesapeake and Ohio Canal National Historical Park. MD 56 veers east away from the railroad track through farmland and passes the entrance to Fort Frederick State Park. The state highway crosses Green Spring Run before reaching the hamlet of Big Spring, where the highway parallels the Lurgan Subdivision. MD 56 crosses Camp Spring Run on a one-lane bridge before veering east again at Big Spring Road, which heads north toward Clear Spring. The state highway crosses Little Conococheague Creek on a one-lane bridge built in 1907 prior to intersecting Dam Number 5 Road, which heads south to Power Plant and Dam No. 5 on the Potomac River. MD 56 reaches its eastern terminus at MD 68 (Clear Spring Road) in the hamlet of Charlton near Pinesburg.

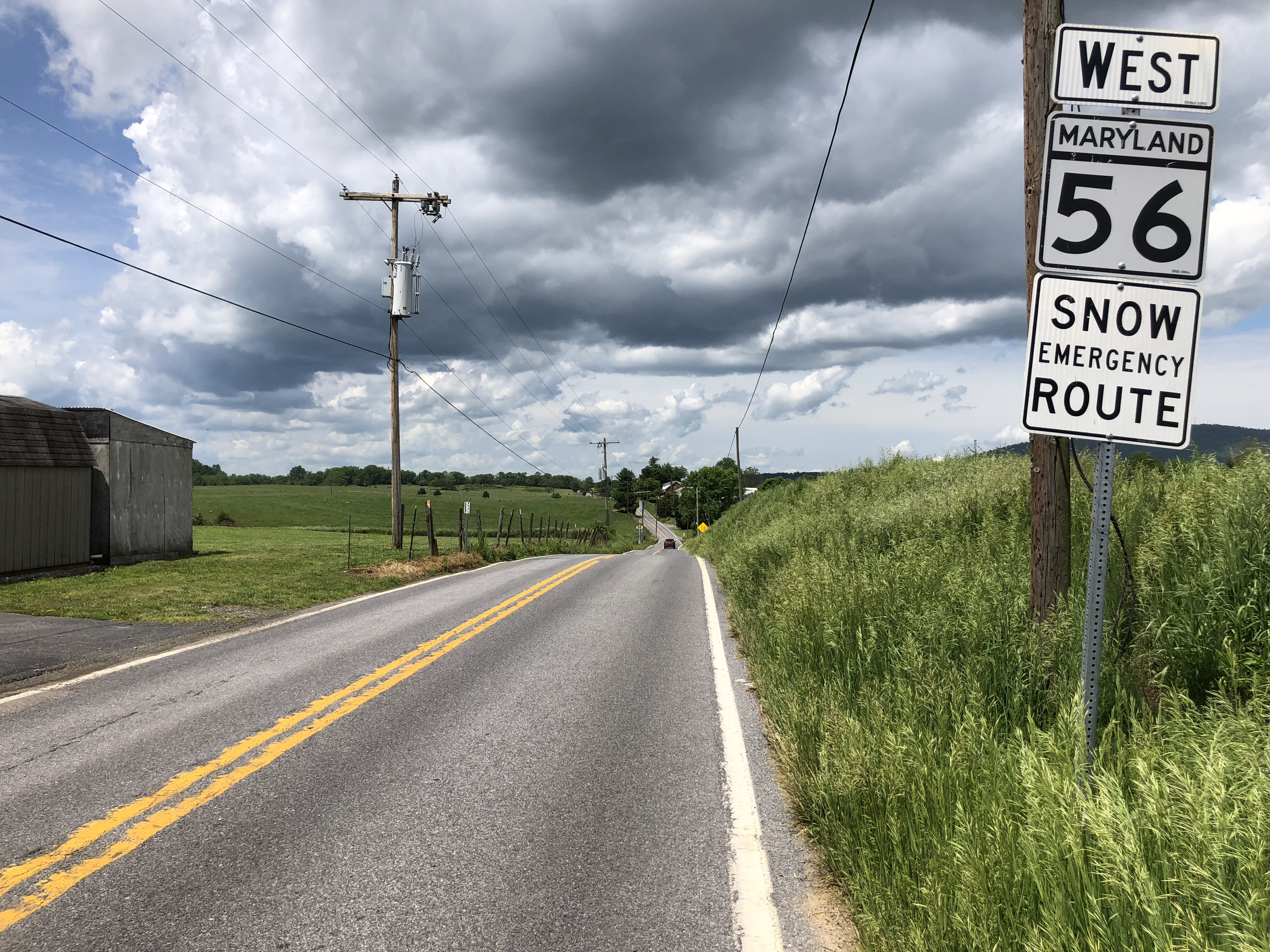
View west along MD 56 in Ashton

== History ==
The first section of MD 56 was constructed as a state-aid road from US 40 south to Big Pool in 1916. In 1930, the state highway was extended east to the access road to Fort Frederick State Park. The access road was designated MD 44 between 1946 and 1969. MD 56 was extended east to Four Locks Road in Big Spring in two sections between 1930 and 1934. The state highway was extended to its eastern terminus at MD 68 near Pinesburg in 1958. Big Pool Road originally had a right-angle turn at Ernstville Road in Big Pool. That intersection was bypassed when a curve was constructed concurrent with the construction of MD 56's interchange with I-70 in 1964. The portion of MD 56 between US 40 and I-70 was transferred to county maintenance around 1995.

== Junction list ==
The entire route is in Washington County.

Location	mi	km	Destinations	Notes
Big Pool	0.00– 0.14	0.00– 0.23	I-70 / Big Pool Road north – Hagerstown, Hancock, Indian Springs	Exit 12 (I-70); western terminus
Pinesburg	8.06	12.97	MD 68 (Clear Spring Road) – Clear Spring, Williamsport	Eastern terminus
1.000 mi = 1.609 km; 1.000 km = 0.621 mi
