= Elliot-Bester House =

Historic house in Maryland, United States

- Elliott-Bester House
- U.S. National Register of Historic Places
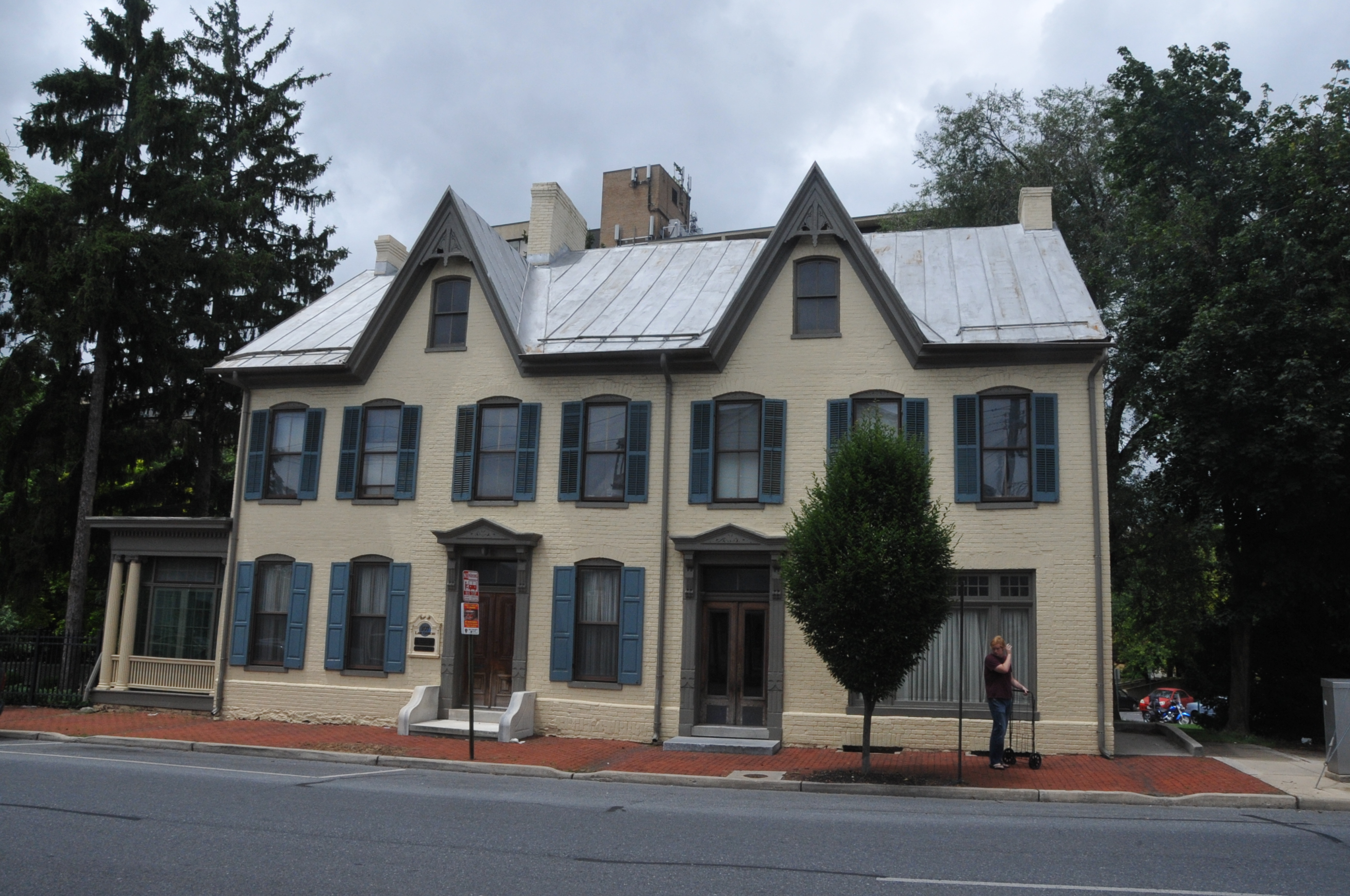
- The Elliott-Bester House in 2007.

- Location within Maryland Location within the United States
- Location: 205-207 S. Potomac St., Hagerstown, Maryland
- Coordinates: 39°38′19.7″N 77°43′20.9″W
- Area: less than one acre
- Built: 1790
- NRHP reference No.: 75000924
- Added to NRHP: May 2, 1975

Elliott-Bester House is a historic home in Hagerstown, Washington County, Maryland, United States. It is a two-story brick dwelling, painted yellow and trimmed with black and white. The home is associated with Commodore Jesse D. Elliott, who spent his boyhood years there.

It was listed on the National Register of Historic Places in 1975.
