= Pinesburg, Maryland =

Unincorporated community in Maryland, United States

- Unincorporated community
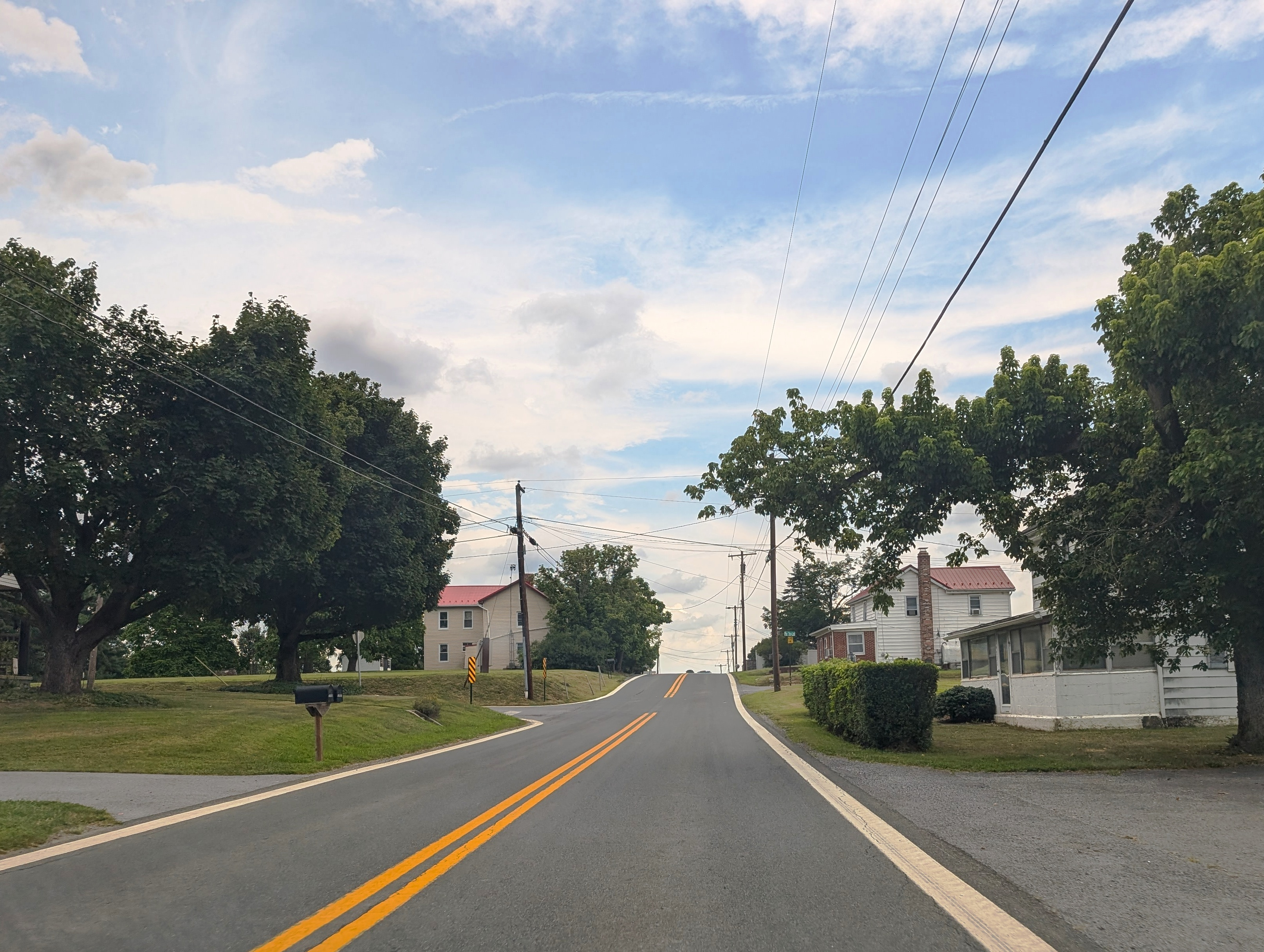
- MD 68 eastbound through Pinesburg

- Location within Maryland Location within the United States
- Coordinates: 39°37′30″N 77°51′05″W
- Country: United States
- State: Maryland
- County: Washington

Area
  - Total: 0.73 sq mi (1.90 km^{2})
  - Land: 0.73 sq mi (1.90 km^{2})
  - Water: 0 sq mi (0.00 km^{2})
- Elevation: 456 ft (139 m)

Population (2020)
  - Total: 444
  - Density: 606.2/sq mi (234.05/km^{2})
- Time zone: UTC−5 (Eastern (EST))
  - Summer (DST): UTC−4 (EDT)
- ZIP code: 21795
- Area codes: 240 & 301
- GNIS feature ID: 2583671

Pinesburg is an unincorporated community and census-designated place in Washington County, Maryland, United States. Its population was 449 as of the 2010 census.

== Geography ==
According to the U.S. Census Bureau, the community has an area of 0.732 square miles (1.90 km^{2}), all land.

== Demographics ==
Historical population
| Census | Pop. | Note | %± |
|---|---|---|---|
| 2020 | 444 | | — |
U.S. Decennial Census
