= St. James, Maryland =

- CDP
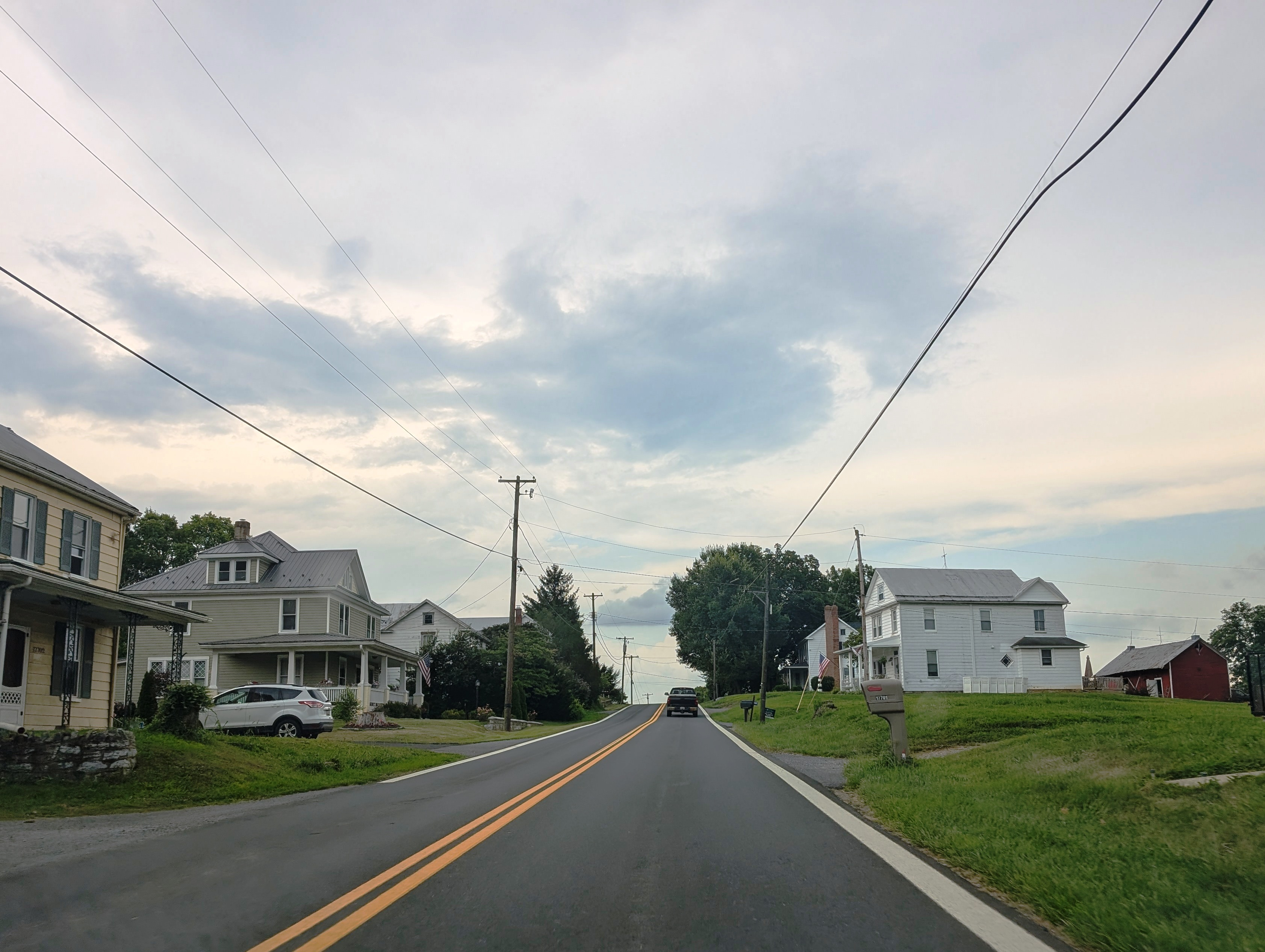
- MD 68 eastbound in St. James

- Location of St. James, Maryland
- Coordinates: 39°34′22″N 77°45′25″W
- Country: United States
- State: Maryland
- County: Washington

Area
  - Total: 6.05 sq mi (15.66 km^{2})
  - Land: 6.05 sq mi (15.66 km^{2})
  - Water: 0 sq mi (0.00 km^{2})
- Elevation: 509 ft (155 m)

Population (2020)
  - Total: 4,757
  - Density: 786.9/sq mi (303.83/km^{2})
- Time zone: UTC−5 (Eastern (EST))
  - Summer (DST): UTC−4 (EDT)
- FIPS code: 24-69550
- GNIS feature ID: 2390346

St. James is a census-designated place (CDP) in Washington County, Maryland, United States. The population was 1,657 at the 2000 census. It is also the home of St. James School, Hagerstown, a small, Episcopalian, boarding school. St. James was formerly named "Lydia."

== Geography ==
According to the United States Census Bureau, the CDP has a total area of 6.0 square miles (16 km^{2}), all land.

== Demographics ==
Historical population
Census	Pop.	Note	%±
2020	4,757		—
U.S. Decennial Census

=== 2020 census ===
As of the 2020 census, St. James had a population of 4,757. The median age was 37.4 years. 27.9% of residents were under the age of 18 and 15.1% of residents were 65 years of age or older. For every 100 females there were 98.2 males, and for every 100 females age 18 and over there were 94.0 males age 18 and over.

88.5% of residents lived in urban areas, while 11.5% lived in rural areas.

There were 1,477 households in St. James, of which 43.1% had children under the age of 18 living in them. Of all households, 68.4% were married-couple households, 10.2% were households with a male householder and no spouse or partner present, and 15.6% were households with a female householder and no spouse or partner present. About 15.8% of all households were made up of individuals and 7.4% had someone living alone who was 65 years of age or older.

There were 1,560 housing units, of which 5.3% were vacant. The homeowner vacancy rate was 1.4% and the rental vacancy rate was 15.9%.

Racial composition as of the 2020 census
Race	Number	Percent
White	3,019	63.5%
Black or African American	726	15.3%
American Indian and Alaska Native	6	0.1%
Asian	384	8.1%
Native Hawaiian and Other Pacific Islander	9	0.2%
Some other race	221	4.6%
Two or more races	392	8.2%
Hispanic or Latino (of any race)	474	10.0%

=== 2000 census ===
As of the census of 2000, there were 1,657 people, 631 households, and 499 families residing in the CDP. The population density was 276.8 inhabitants per square mile (106.9/km^{2}). There were 655 housing units at an average density of 109.4 per square mile (42.2/km^{2}). The racial makeup of the CDP was 95.65% White, 2.29% African American, 1.21% Asian, 0.42% from other races, and 0.42% from two or more races. Hispanic or Latino of any race were 0.78% of the population.

There were 631 households, out of which 36.3% had children under the age of 18 living with them, 70.8% were married couples living together, 6.3% had a female householder with no husband present, and 20.9% were non-families. 16.8% of all households were made up of individuals, and 9.0% had someone living alone who was 65 years of age or older. The average household size was 2.62 and the average family size was 2.94.

In the CDP, the population was spread out, with 24.9% under the age of 18, 5.6% from 18 to 24, 29.1% from 25 to 44, 26.3% from 45 to 64, and 14.2% who were 65 years of age or older. The median age was 39 years. For every 100 females, there were 96.3 males. For every 100 females age 18 and over, there were 94.2 males.

The median income for a household in the CDP was $53,750, and the median income for a family was $65,924. Males had a median income of $39,464 versus $28,594 for females. The per capita income for the CDP was $20,193. About 2.3% of families and 5.1% of the population were below the poverty line, including 9.7% of those under age 18 and 3.3% of those age 65 or over.
