= St. Mark's Episcopal Church (Lappans, Maryland) =

Historic church in Maryland, United States

- St. Mark's Episcopal Church-Lappans
- U.S. National Register of Historic Places
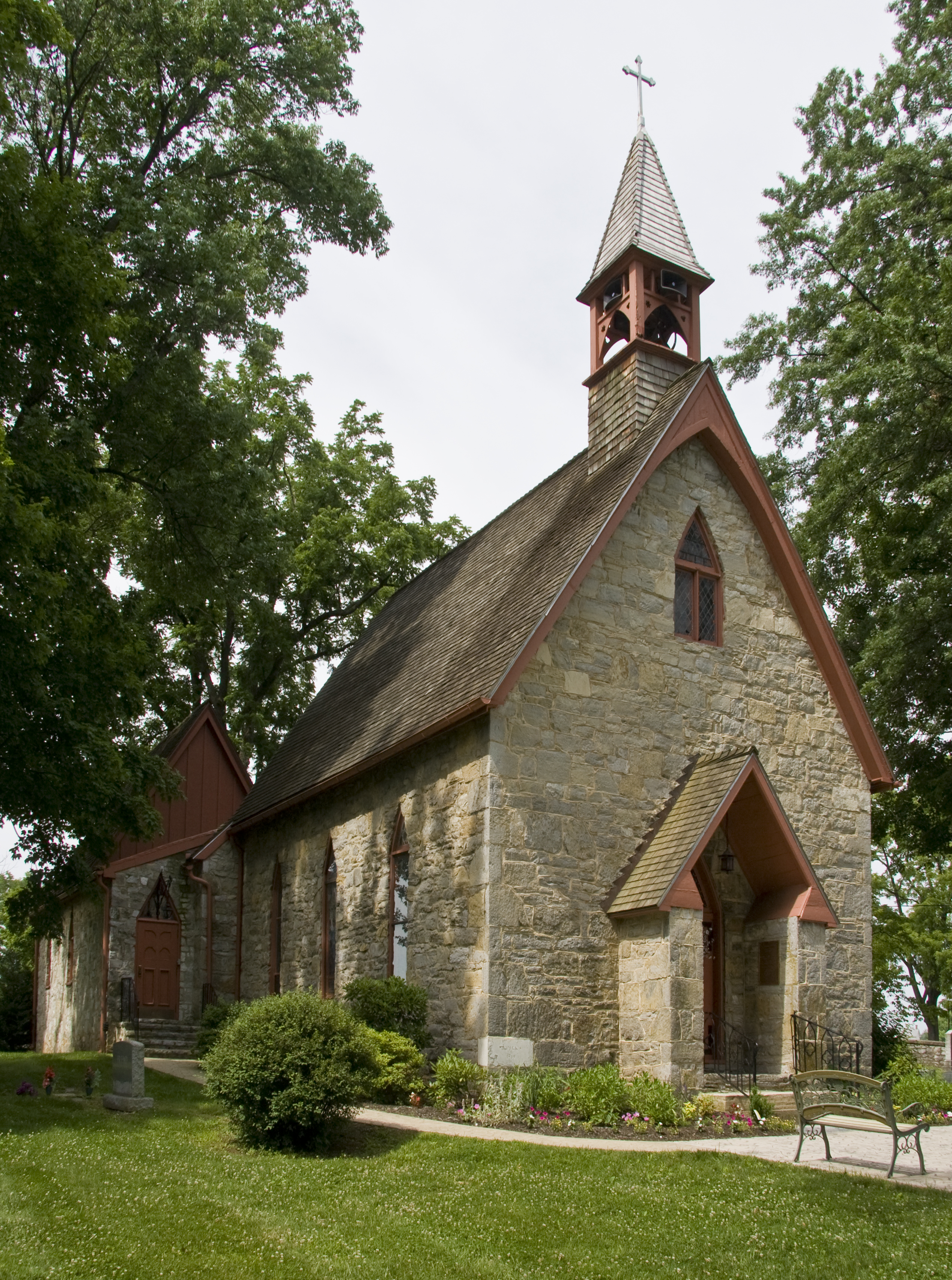

- Location within Maryland Location within the United States
- Location: 18313 Lappans Rd., Boonsboro, Maryland
- Coordinates: 39°33′3″N 77°44′3″W
- Area: 2 acres (0.81 ha)
- Built: 1849
- Architect: Morin, Upton
- Architectural style: Gothic Revival
- NRHP reference No.: 99000931
- Added to NRHP: August 5, 1999

St. Mark's Episcopal Church is a historic Episcopal church located at Boonsboro, Washington County, Maryland, United States. Originally formed within Saint John's Parish, it was incorporated into Antietam Parish in 1899.

The original portion of the church was built in 1849 and is rectangular in shape, with two-foot-thick walls, 17 feet tall, constructed of rough-cut native limestone. It is enclosed by a stone wall which was built in 1922 and surrounded on its eastern, southern, and western sides by a cemetery of 173 markers. The church features a wooden portico covered with a wooden Gothic Revival roof and a steeple, which rises another 12 feet and includes the original bell and electronic carillon. The building was closed for a brief period following the Battle of Antietam in 1862, but was reopened and has held services continuously ever since.

It was listed on the National Register of Historic Places in 1999 as "St. Mark's Episcopal Church-Lappans." The church has more recently explored the role of slaves, slave owners, and freed slaves in its history.
