= Downsville, Maryland =

Unincorporated community in Maryland, United States

- Unincorporated community
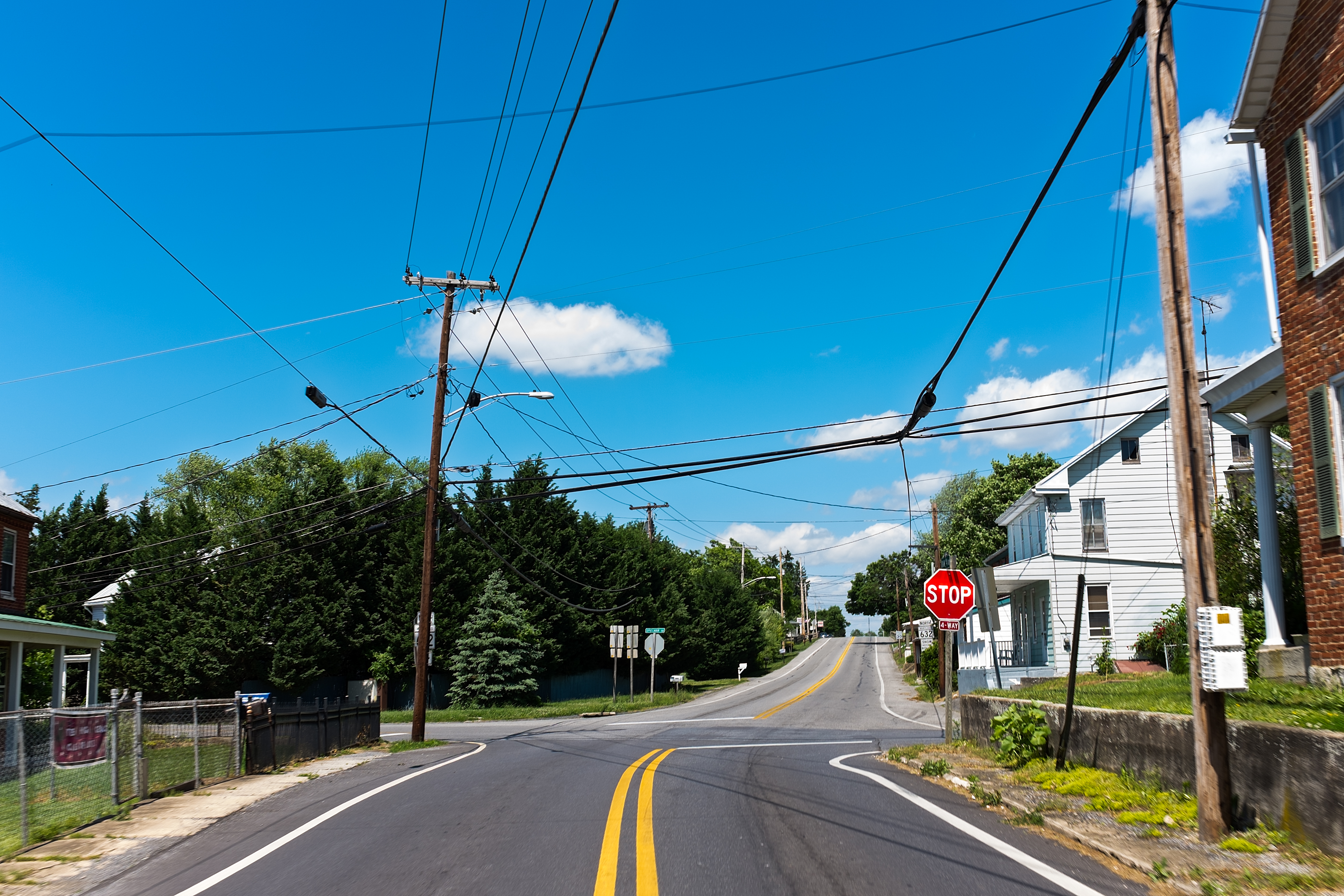

- Location within Maryland Location within the United States
- Coordinates: 39°33′17″N 77°48′06″W
- Country: United States
- State: Maryland
- County: Washington

Area
  - Total: 0.63 sq mi (1.62 km^{2})
  - Land: 0.63 sq mi (1.62 km^{2})
  - Water: 0 sq mi (0.00 km^{2})
- Elevation: 466 ft (142 m)

Population (2020)
  - Total: 341
  - Density: 545.8/sq mi (210.75/km^{2})
- Time zone: UTC-5 (Eastern (EST))
  - Summer (DST): UTC-4 (EDT)
- Area codes: 301, 240
- GNIS feature ID: 2583609

Downsville is an unincorporated community and census-designated place (CDP) in southwestern Washington County, Maryland, United States. Its population was 355 as of the 2010 census. It is located southeast of Williamsport on Maryland Route 63 and on Maryland Route 632, southwest of Hagerstown. It is officially included in the Hagerstown Metropolitan Area (Hagerstown-Martinsburg, MD-WV Metropolitan Statistical Area).

== Geography ==
According to the U.S. Census Bureau, the community has an area of 0.625 square miles (1.62 km^{2}), all land.

== Demographics ==
Historical population
Census	Pop.	Note	%±
2020	341		—
U.S. Decennial Census
