= U.S. Route 40 in Maryland =

Section of U.S. Highway in Maryland, United States

U.S. Route 40
- US 40 highlighted in red

Route information
- Maintained by MDSHA, Baltimore DOT, and MDTA
- Length: 221.31 mi (356.16 km)
- Existed: 1926–present
- Tourist routes: Historic National Road; Journey Through Hallowed Ground Byway; Chesapeake and Ohio Canal Scenic Byway; Antietam Campaign Scenic Byway

Major junctions
- West end: US 40 at the Pennsylvania state line near Keysers Ridge
- I-68 / US 219 near Grantsville; US 220 in Cumberland; I-70 / US 522 in Hancock; I-81 near Hagerstown; US 15 / US 340 / Jefferson Street in Frederick; I-70 / I-270 in Frederick; US 29 in Ellicott City; I-695 in Catonsville; US 1 in Baltimore; I-95 in Baltimore
- East end: US 40 at Delaware border in Elkton

Location
- Country: United States
- State: Maryland
- Counties: Garrett, Allegany, Washington, Frederick, Carroll, Howard, Baltimore, City of Baltimore, Harford, Cecil

Highway system
- United States Numbered Highway System; List; Special; Divided; Maryland highway system; Interstate; US; State; Scenic Byways
| ← MD 39 | → MD 41 |

U.S. Route 40 (US 40) in the U.S. state of Maryland runs from Garrett County in Western Maryland to Cecil County in the state's northeastern corner. With a total length of 221 miles (356 km), it is the longest numbered highway in Maryland. Almost half of the road overlaps or parallels with Interstate 68 (I-68) or I-70, while the old alignment is generally known as US 40 Alternate, US 40 Scenic, or Maryland Route 144 (MD 144). West of Baltimore, in the Piedmont and Appalachian Mountains / Blue Ridge region of the Western Maryland panhandle of the small state, the portions where it does not overlap an Interstate highway are mostly two-lane roads. The portion northeast of Baltimore going toward Wilmington in northern Delaware and Philadelphia in southeastern Pennsylvania is a four-lane divided highway, known as the Pulaski Highway (named for American Revolutionary War (1775–1783) foreign military volunteer of Polish cavalry officer Casimir Pulaski, 1745–1779). This section crosses the Susquehanna River at the north end of the Chesapeake Bay on the Thomas J. Hatem Memorial Bridge.

From Cumberland on the western branch of the Potomac River and terminus of the historic Chesapeake and Ohio Canal, west to Pennsylvania, US 40 is the successor to the historic route of the National Road, first Federal interstate road built in the early 19th century which eventually ran from Baltimore west, through Ohio, Indiana, and Illinois to Vandalia, then territorial capital of the Illinois Territory near the Mississippi River.

East of Cumberland, towards Baltimore, US 40 follows several former private company turnpikes, most notably the Cumberland Turnpike, Baltimore and Frederick-town Turnpike, later known as Frederick Road (MD 144) between Baltimore and Frederick.

The route from Baltimore northeast to the Delaware state line follows another historic East Coast / Northeast Corridor routing towards Philadelphia, New York City and Boston including the old Baltimore and Havre-de-Grace Turnpike (now mostly bypassed and known as the Old Philadelphia Road, MD 7).

== Route description ==
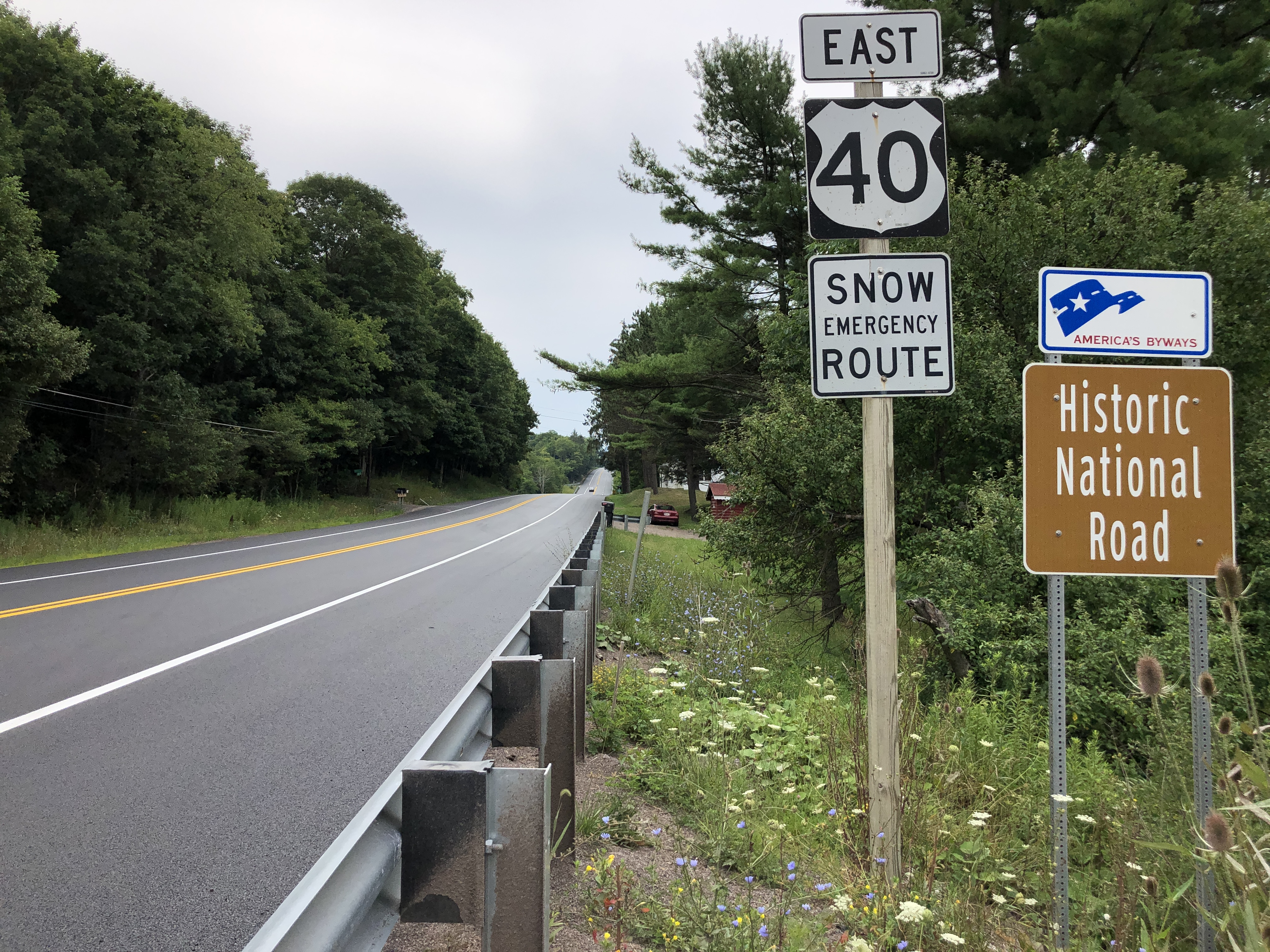
US 40 eastbound past the Pennsylvania state line in Garrett County

US 40 enters Maryland from Pennsylvania in Garrett County and follows a two-lane undivided road to Keysers Ridge. Between Keysers Ridge and Hancock, US 40 runs concurrent with I-68 across the mountains of Western Maryland, passing through Cumberland. In Hancock, US 40 becomes concurrent with I-70 and follows the Potomac River before it splits from I-70. US 40 follows a two-lane road parallel to I-70 east to Hagerstown, where it passes through the center of the city and turns southeast. Between Hagerstown and Frederick, the route heads southeast along a two-lane road parallel to I-70 through rural areas. In Frederick, US 40 joins US 15 on a freeway alignment before it continues east concurrent with I-70. US 40 follows I-70 east through rural areas to Howard County, where it splits from I-70 and continues along a multilane divided highway through suburban areas, passing through Ellicott City. The route heads east through the city of Baltimore along city streets, with a freeway section located west of downtown Baltimore. US 40 continues northeast from Baltimore along Pulaski Highway, a multilane divided highway that runs parallel to I-95 through suburban areas, passing through Aberdeen. Between Havre de Grace and Perryville, the route crosses the Susquehanna River on the Thomas J. Hatem Memorial Bridge. US 40 continues east parallel to I-95 and leaves Maryland for Delaware in Elkton.

Throughout Maryland, US 40 is paralleled by several former alignments that are designated as U.S. or state highways. US 40 Alt. is designated along the former alignment between Keysers Ridge and Cumberland while another US 40 Alt. runs along the former alignment between Hagerstown and Frederick. US 40 Scenic is designated along a former alignment parallel to I-68/US 40 in eastern Allegany County and western Washington County. MD 144 is designated along several separate former alignments between Cumberland and Baltimore while MD 7 is designated along several separate former alignments between Baltimore and Elkton.

=== Garrett County ===
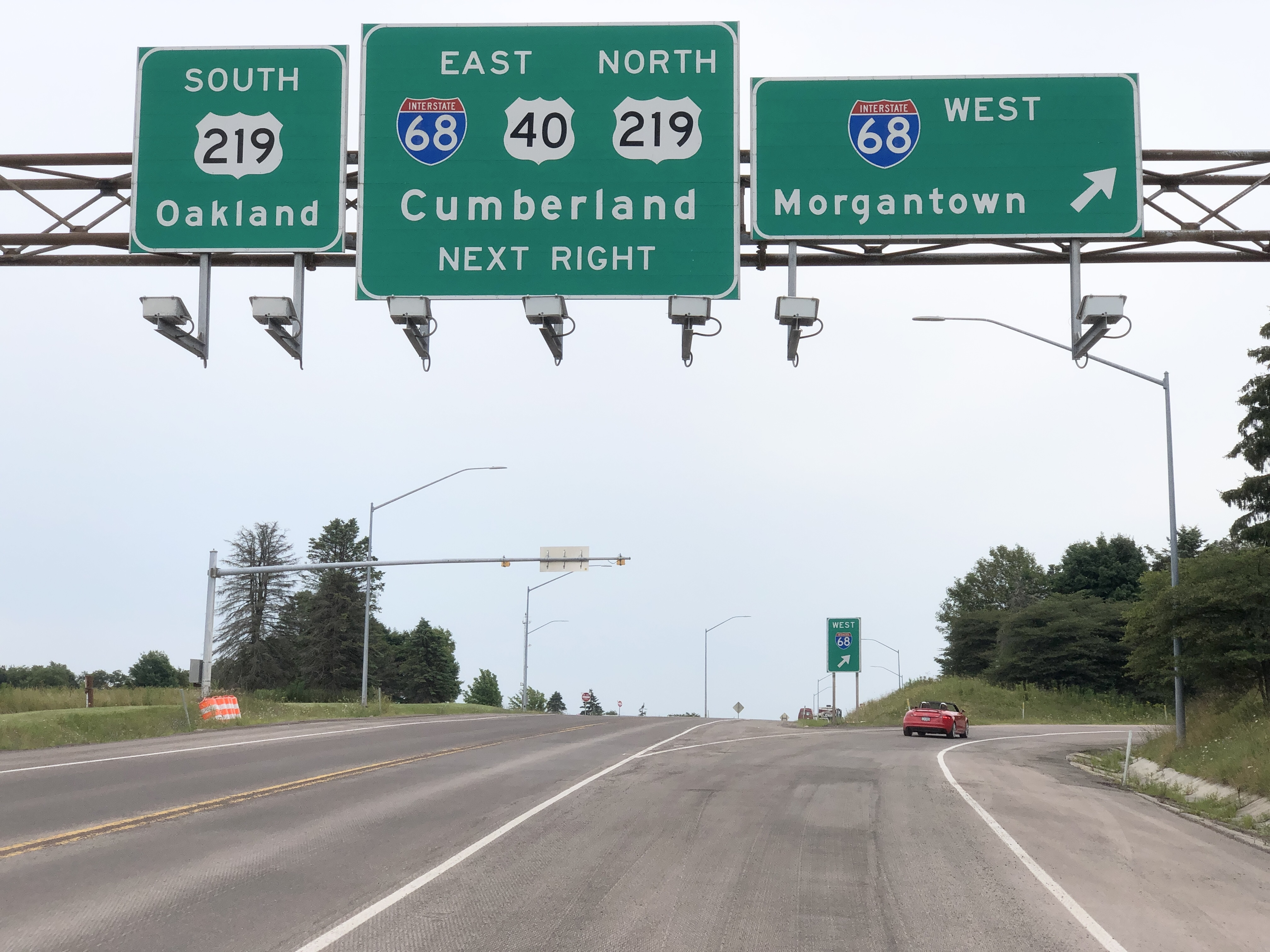
US 40 eastbound at I-68 and US 219 in Keysers Ridge

US 40 enters Maryland from Pennsylvania in Garrett County in the Western Maryland region of the state. From the state line, the route heads southeast on National Pike, a three-lane undivided road with one eastbound lane and two westbound lanes that soon narrows to a two-lane road as it descends Winding Ridge, which is part of the Allegheny Mountains. The road runs through wooded areas with some farmland and homes, with MD 733C looping to the north. US 40 continues southeast through sections of the Savage River State Forest and has a junction with MD 826H, at which point it curves east and passes businesses as a four-lane undivided road before intersecting the western terminus of US 40 Alt. in the community of Keysers Ridge. At this point, US 40 Alt. continues east along National Pike while US 40 turns south onto a two-lane road and comes to a cloverleaf interchange with I-68 and US 219.

At this interchange, US 219 continues south along the two-lane road while US 40 heads southeast concurrent with I-68 and US 219 on National Freeway, a four-lane freeway that has a third lane for trucks while climbing hills and mountains. The road curves east and passes through another section of the Savage River State Forest, heading across Negro Mountain. Past the crossing of Negro Mountain, I-68/US 40/US 219 passes through a mix of farmland and woodland, coming to a diamond interchange with MD 495 to the south of the town of Grantsville. Following this interchange, the freeway descends a hill before it crosses the Casselman River. After crossing the river, the road ascends a hill, running through wooded areas and curving to the east-southeast. US 219 splits from I-68/US 40 by heading north on a freeway at a dumbbell interchange; this interchange also marks the southern terminus of US 219 Bus. From here, I-68/US 40 continues east-southeast along the National Freeway as it ascends forested Meadow Mountain. At the summit of the mountain, the road reaches an interchange with Lower New Germany Road (MD 948D). Past this interchange, the freeway descends the mountain. I-68/US 40 heads east through a mix of farmland and woodland, ascending and descending two hills and crossing the Eastern Continental Divide. Farther east, the freeway curves southeast and comes to an interchange with MD 546 in Finzel. Following this, the road heads across forested Savage Mountain.

=== Allegany County ===
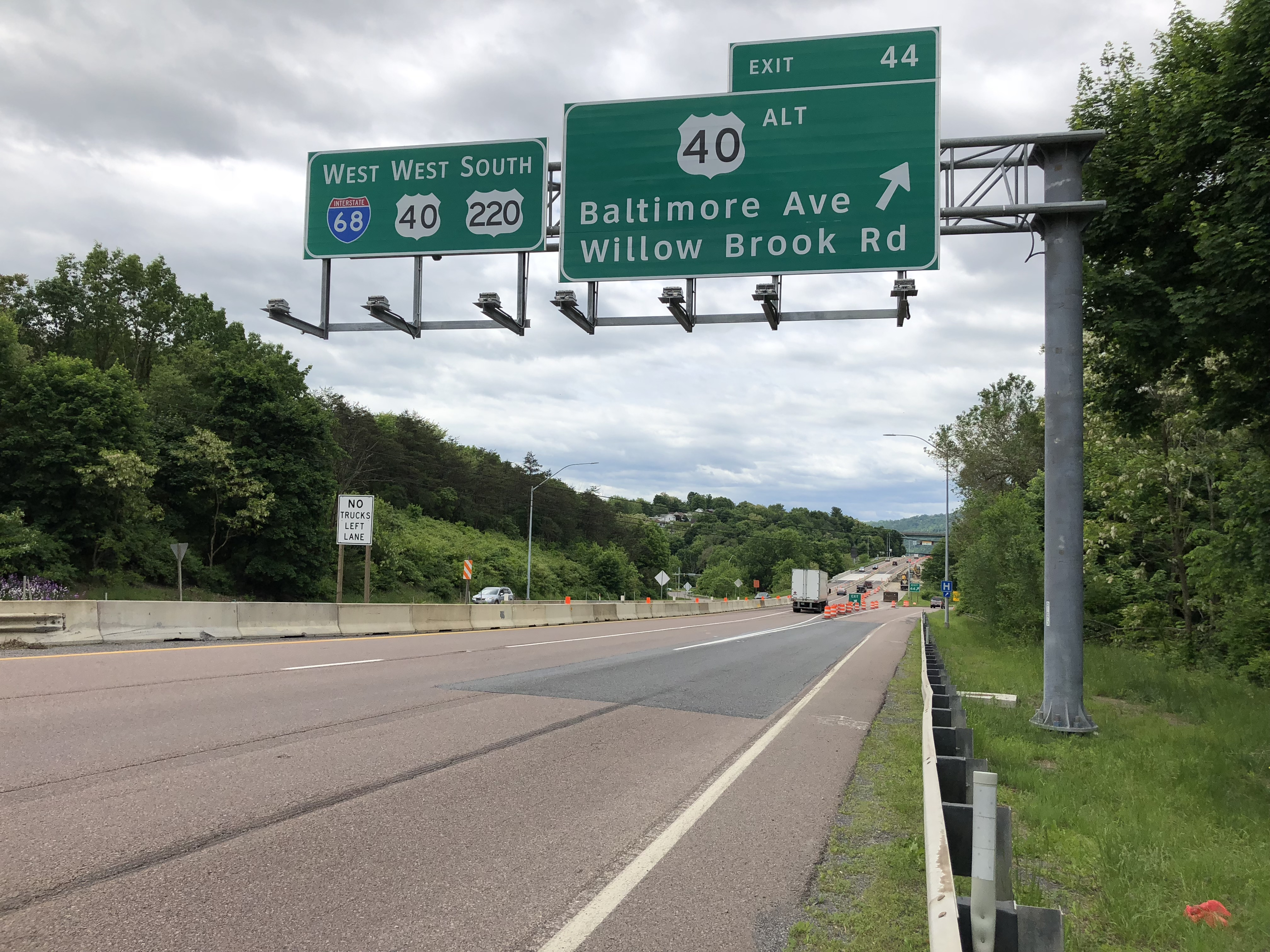
I-68/US 40/US 220 concurrency in Cumberland

I-68/US 40 crosses into Allegany County and continues to descend Savage Mountain, coming to an eastbound weigh station. The road curves south and then southeast before it comes to a diamond interchange with Midlothian Road (MD 736) in Midlothian that provides access to the city of Frostburg and Frostburg State University to the northeast. From here, the freeway turns east as it runs through wooded areas with some nearby development, crossing over Georges Creek and MD 936 before passing south of God's Ark of Safety church and reaching an interchange with MD 36 that serves Frostburg. I-68/US 40 continues east-northeast and descends a hill, passing over Spruce Hollow and MD 55 to the south of Clarysville. The median of the road widens and it heads across forested Dans Mountain, with US 40 Alt. parallel a short distance to the north in the Braddock Run valley. After crossing Dans Mountain, the freeway leaves the Allegheny Mountains. At this point, I-68/US 40 reaches a partial interchange connecting to US 40 Alt. and MD 53 in La Vale, with a westbound exit and entrance and an eastbound entrance. Following this, the road passes near developed areas and comes to a partial interchange with Vocke Road (MD 658), with all movements except a westbound entrance. At this interchange, southbound US 220 Truck becomes concurrent with westbound I-68/US 40, splitting to head south along Vocke Road. From here, the freeway turns northeast and ascends forested Haystack Mountain. The road turns east and reaches the summit of the mountain, where it begins to descend the mountain. I-68/US 40 comes to a westbound ramp with Seton Drive that provides access to MD 49.

Following this, the freeway curves northeast and enters the city of Cumberland, coming to an interchange with US 220. At this point, US 220 Truck ends and US 220 joins I-68/US 40 on the National Freeway, which descends a 6 percent grade. The road passes south of residential areas of the city, coming to a bridge over CSX's Mountain Subdivision railroad line and Kelly Road, where there is an eastbound entrance from Kelly Road. From here, the freeway runs along the north bank of the North Branch Potomac River and curves northeast through developed areas, coming to an eastbound right-in/right-out interchange with Johnson Street and a westbound right-in/right-out interchange with Beall Street that serves Cumberland along with Ridgeley, West Virginia across the river. I-68/US 40/US 220 continues east and passes over Wills Creek and the Western Maryland Scenic Railroad south of the Cumberland station, heading away from the North Branch Potomac River, before passing over the Chesapeake and Ohio Canal and coming to an interchange with MD 51 to the south of downtown Cumberland. Past this interchange, the road passes over CSX's Cumberland Terminal Subdivision railroad line south of the Cumberland station serving Amtrak's Capitol Limited train before it reaches a right-in/right-out interchange serving Maryland Avenue near homes and some businesses. From here, the freeway curves northeast and passes through wooded areas with nearby development before coming to a diamond interchange with the eastern terminus of US 40 Alt. and the western terminus of MD 639.

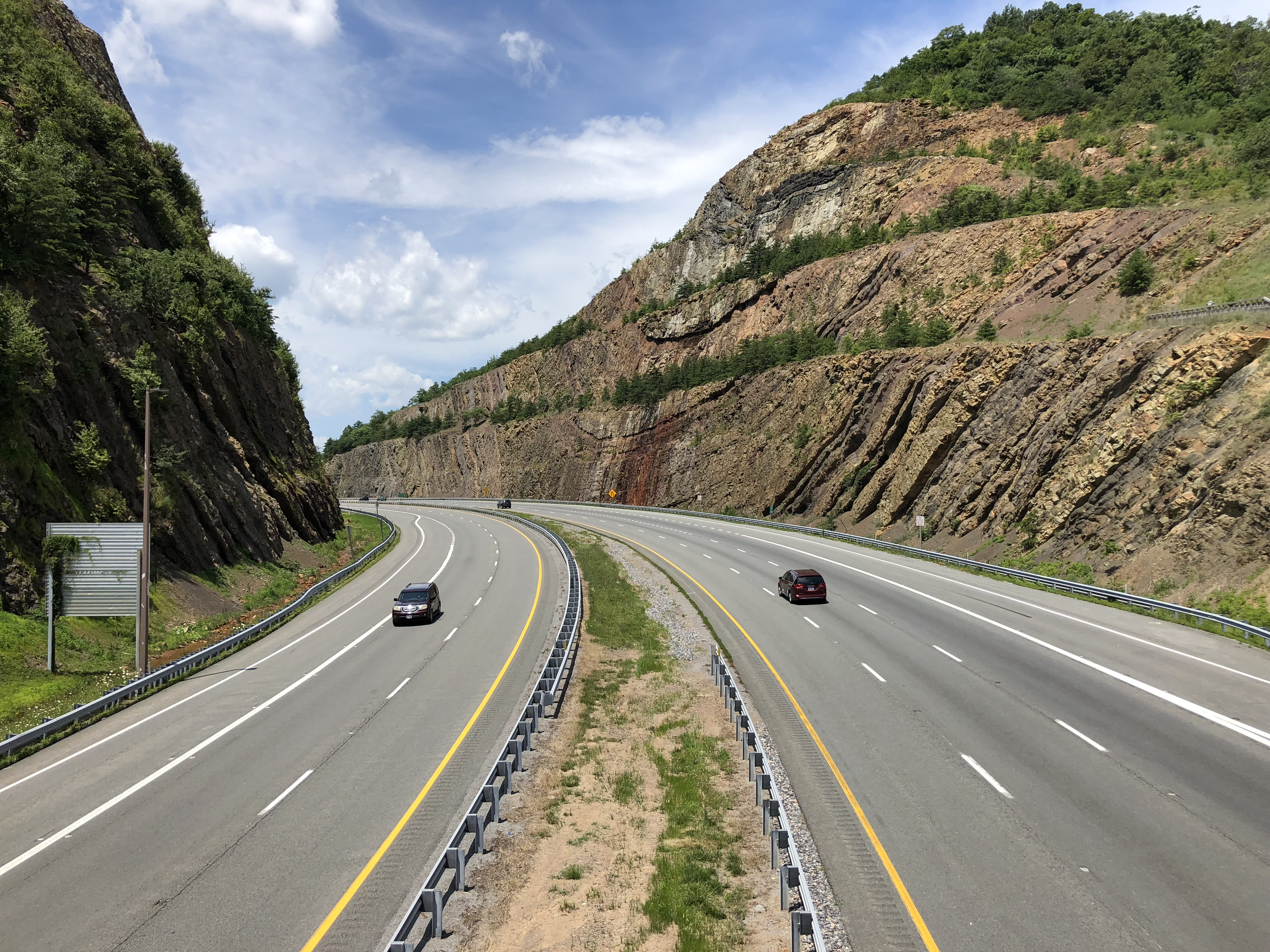
A 340-foot (100 m) deep cut in Sideling Hill makes room for the I-68/US 40 roadway

I-68/US 40/US 220 continues northeast through forested areas and leaves Cumberland, reaching an interchange with Hillcrest Drive (MD 952). Following this, the road comes to a westbound exit and entrance with MD 144, where it curves east and US 220 splits from I-68/US 40 by heading north at an interchange that also has access to MD 144. Past this interchange, I-68/US 40 ascends a grade as it runs through forested areas with some fields, curving northeast and passing over MD 144. The freeway continues northeast, with MD 144 closely parallel to the southeast, and comes to a diamond interchange with Pleasant Valley Road (MD 948AD) that provides access to Rocky Gap State Park to the north. From here, the road ascends Martin Mountain Ridge and comes to an eastbound exit and westbound entrance with MD 144 at the summit of the ridge. From here, the I-68/US 40 descends the ridge, turning to the southeast and east as it runs through a mix of farmland and woodland closely parallel to MD 144. The freeway reaches an interchange connecting to MD 144 in Flintstone. From here, the road heads across Polish Mountain, curving southeast. I-68/US 40 turns east and continues through the Green Ridge State Forest parallel to MD 144. Farther east, the freeway passes under MD 144 before it comes to an interchange with the western terminus of US 40 Scenic at Fifteen Mile Creek Road. Past this interchange, the road turns southeast before it curves east and reaches an interchange with M.V. Smith Road (MD 948AL). I-68/US 40 turns northeast and descends Town Hill. The road heads into wooded areas with some farm fields and curves east to an interchange with Orleans Road (MD 948Z). The freeway continues east as it descends a grade before passing under US 40 Scenic, which begins to parallel the freeway to the south. I-68/US 40 reaches an interchange with High Germany Road (MD 948Y) in Bellegrove, where US 40 Scenic joins the freeway. Past this interchange, the road crosses Sideling Hill Creek.

=== Washington County ===
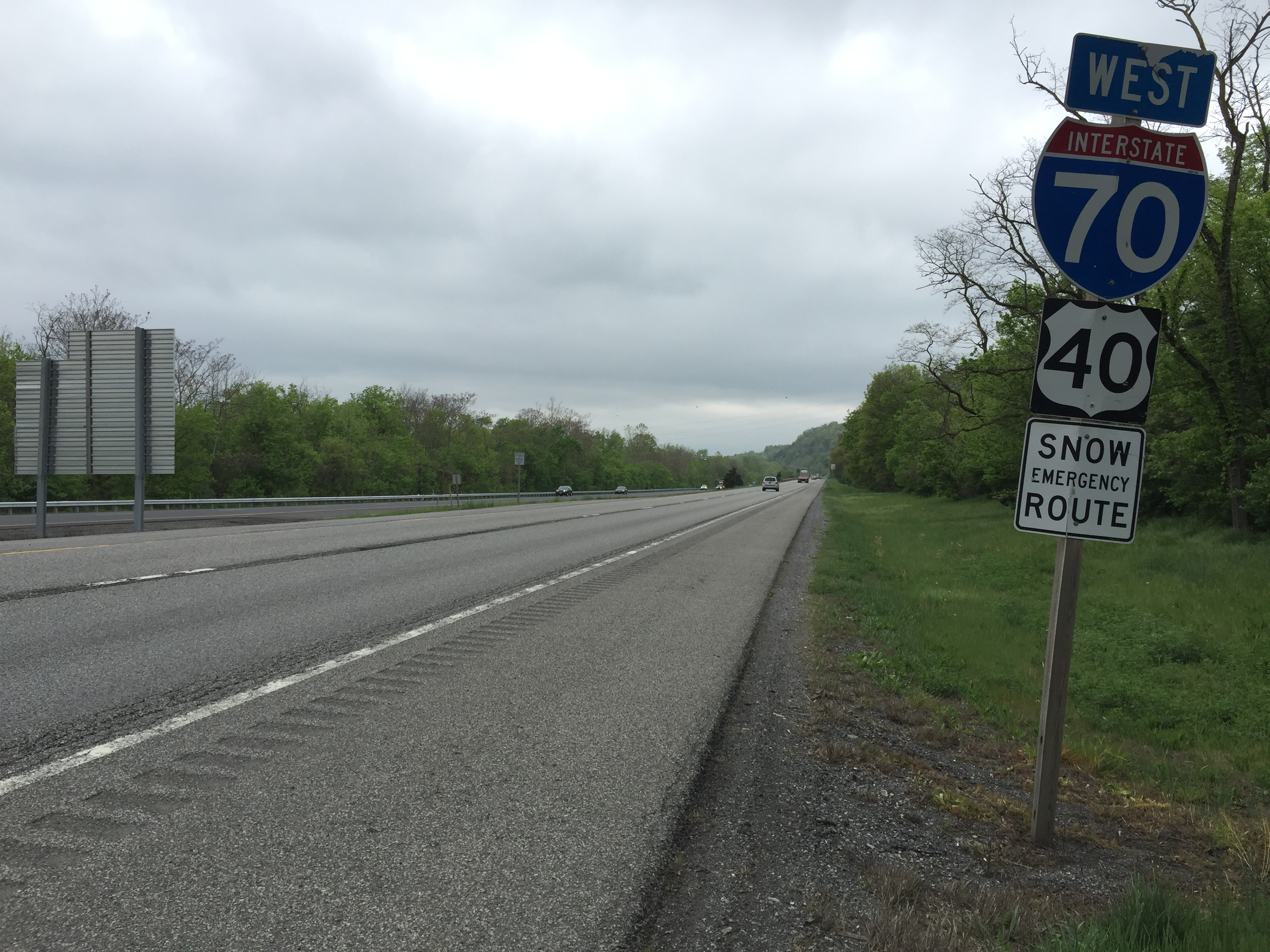
View west along I-70/US 40 in western Washington County

Upon crossing Sideling Hill Creek, I-68/US 40 enters Washington County and curves northeast through forested areas, ascending a grade and coming to a westbound runaway truck ramp. US 40 Scenic splits from the freeway at an eastbound exit and westbound entrance with Mountain Road (MD 903). Past this interchange, I-68/US 40 turns east and passes through a 340-foot (100 m) massive deep cut in Sideling Hill, where the freeway curves southeast and begins to descend the hill. Just to the east of the cut is a pair of rest areas and the Sideling Hill Welcome Center along the westbound side of the road, with a pedestrian bridge providing access from the eastbound direction. Following this, the freeway continues southeast, passing an eastbound runaway truck ramp, before it comes to a diamond interchange with the eastern terminus of US 40 Scenic and the western terminus of a section of MD 144, where it turns northeast. The road curves east and crosses through a gap in Tonoloway Ridge as it continues through forested areas with some farm fields. I-68 reaches its eastern terminus at a directional T interchange with I-70/US 522 near the town of Hancock, where US 40 continues east concurrent with I-70/US 522 on the Eisenhower Memorial Highway, a four-lane freeway. Soon after, US 522 splits from I-70/US 40 at a directional T interchange by heading south and providing access to Hancock. Following this, the freeway continues east across a forested hill, with a third lane for trucks while climbing the hill. The road comes to a westbound exit and eastbound entrance with the eastern terminus of the Hancock section of MD 144, where the median widens and it heads east through wooded areas with the Western Maryland Rail Trail, Chesapeake and Ohio Canal, and the Potomac River parallel to the south. I-70/US 40 comes to an eastbound exit and westbound entrance with MD 615 before MD 615 closely parallels the road to the north to a westbound exit and eastbound entrance at MD 615's southern terminus. Past this interchange, the freeway curves to the southeast.

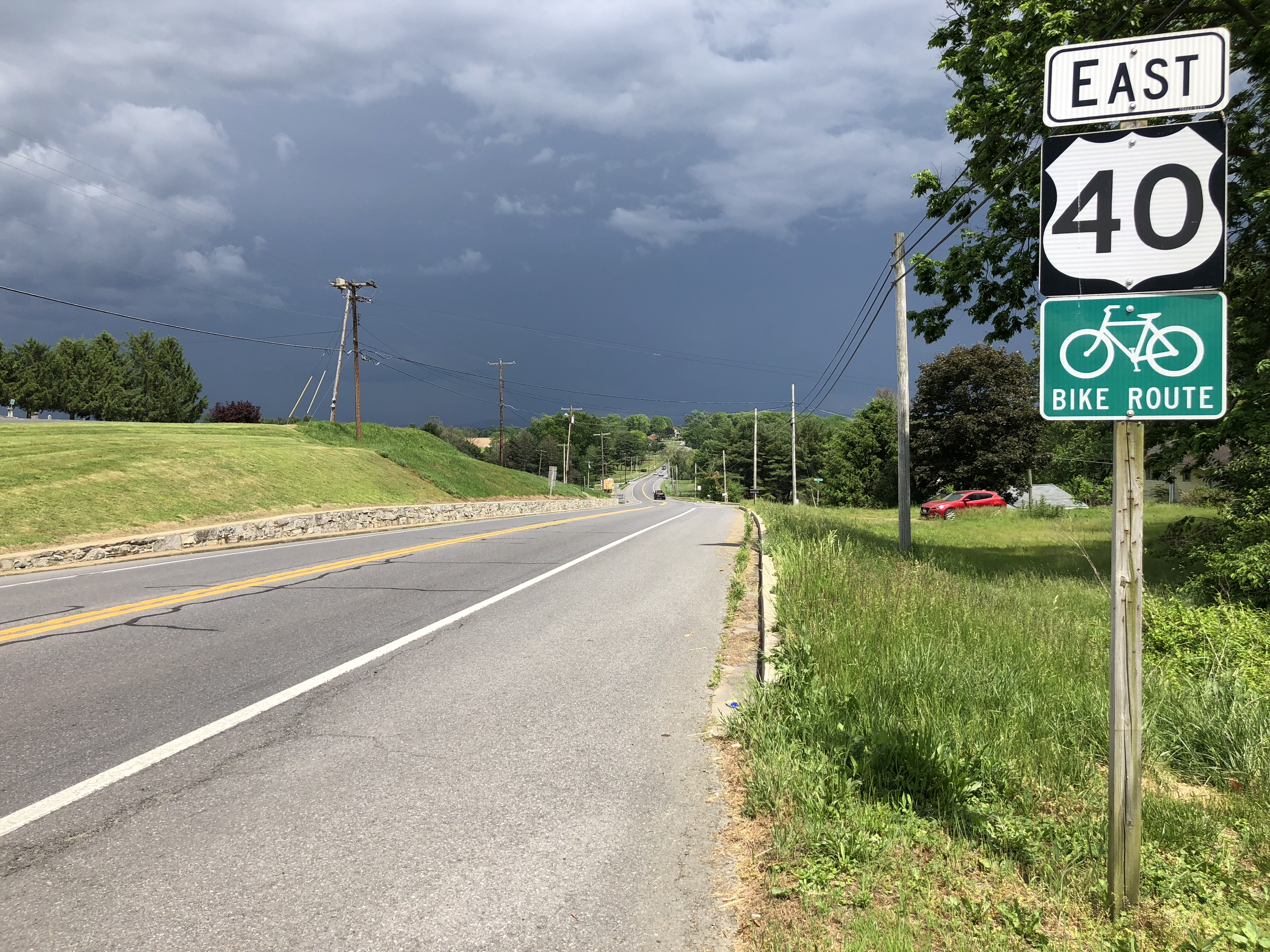
US 40 eastbound past MD 57 near Clear Spring

US 40 splits from I-70 at an eastbound exit and westbound entrance, where it continues southeast onto two-lane undivided National Pike. The road passes through wooded areas with some fields and homes, curving to the east. In the community of Indian Springs, the route intersects Big Pool Road, which heads south to an interchange with I-70 and becomes MD 56. US 40 continues east and crosses forested Fairview Mountain, gaining a second eastbound lane as it ascends the mountain and a second westbound lane as it descends the mountain heading northeast. At the summit of Fairview Mountain, MD 739A loops to the south of the route. After crossing the mountain, the road turns east and enters the Hagerstown Valley, where it passes farm fields before entering the town of Clear Spring. In Clear Spring, the route becomes Cumberland Street and is lined with homes and some businesses, coming to a junction with the western terminus of MD 68. After leaving Clear Spring, US 40 becomes National Pike again and runs through agricultural areas with some woods and homes, intersecting the southern terminus of MD 57. The road continues east through rural areas and crosses Conococheague Creek before passing to the south of Hagerstown Speedway. The route runs through a mix of farmland, woodland, and development, crossing MD 63 before intersecting the western terminus of a section of MD 144 and curving northeast.

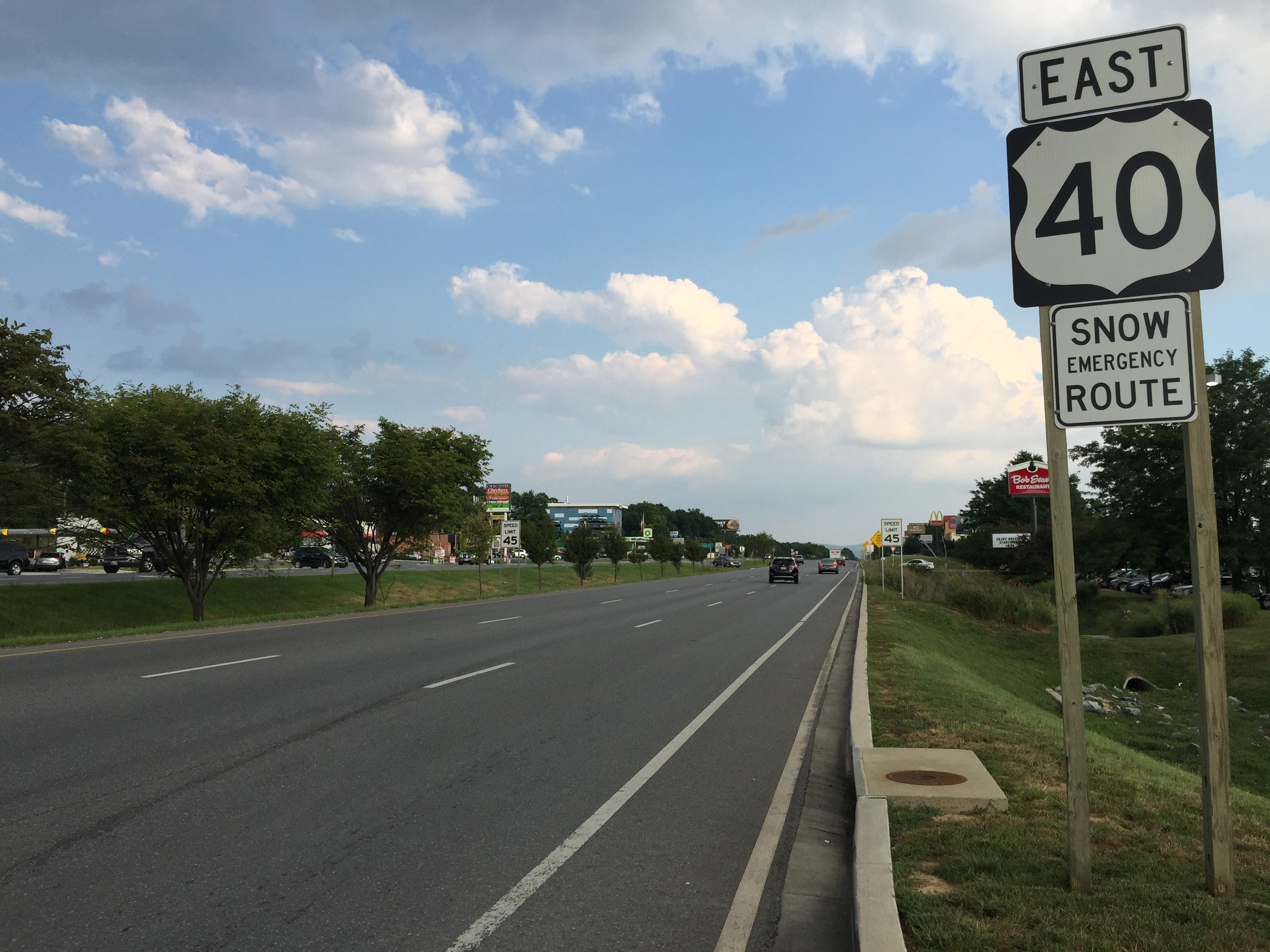
US 40 eastbound in Hagerstown

At this point, US 40 widens to a four-lane divided highway and turns back to the east, entering the city of Hagerstown. Here, the road passes north of residential areas before heading near businesses and coming to a cloverleaf interchange with I-81. Past this interchange, the route intersects the northern terminus of MD 910 before it curves southeast and splits into the one-way pair of Washington Avenue eastbound and West Franklin Street westbound, carrying two lanes in each direction. US 40 passes through residential areas before the eastbound direction becomes West Washington Street and the route heads into commercial areas, intersecting US 11. Past this junction, the one-way pair passes under railroad tracks carrying CSX's Lurgan Subdivision and Norfolk Southern's Hagerstown District lines and enters the commercial downtown of Hagerstown. At the intersection with Potomac Street, the road name changes to East Washington Street eastbound and East Franklin Street westbound. US 40 leaves downtown Hagerstown and the directions of the route rejoin as four-lane divided Dual Highway, intersecting the western terminus of MD 64 and passing a mix of homes and businesses. The road curves to the south-southeast and crosses Antietam Creek as it continues through developed areas, briefly widening to six lanes as it passes several businesses. At the southeastern edge of Hagerstown, the route reaches a cloverleaf interchange with I-70. Following this interchange, US 40 leaves Hagerstown and becomes National Pike, soon narrowing to a two-lane undivided road and passing through farmland and residential development with some woods. The road comes to an intersection with MD 66 in the community of Beaver Creek before it heads to the north of Mason-Dixon Dragway and the community of Mount Lena. Farther southeast, the route leaves the Hagerstown Valley as it ascends forested South Mountain, turning south and passing to the east of Greenbrier State Park. At the summit of the mountain, US 40 curves southeast and crosses over I-70 and the Appalachian Trail.

=== Frederick and Carroll counties ===
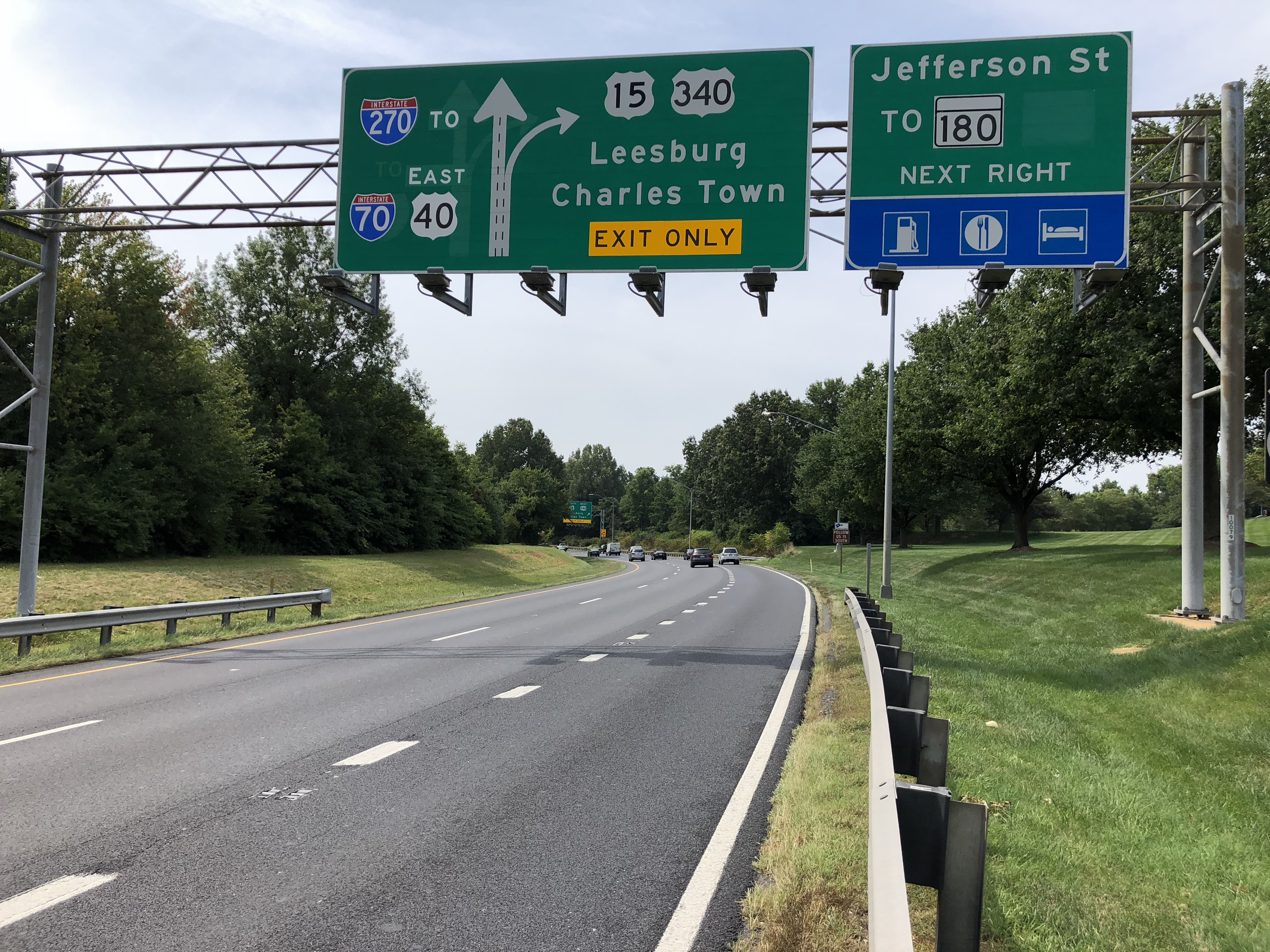
US 15 southbound and US 40 eastbound along the Frederick Freeway in Frederick

After crossing over I-70 and the Appalachian Trail, US 40 enters Frederick County and becomes Baltimore National Pike, heading southeast through forested areas to descend South Mountain as it passes to the south of South Mountain State Park. The road continues into the Middletown Valley and passes through a mix of farmland, woodland, and some residential and commercial development along a straight alignment. The route passes along the northeast border of the town of Myersville and comes to an intersection with MD 17. From here, US 40 continues southeast through agricultural land with some woods and development. Farther southeast, the road leaves the Middletown Valley and ascends forested Catoctin Mountain, passing south of Gambrill State Park and north of the community of Arch Bridge. The route passes near some fields and development at the summit before it heads south to descend the forested mountain, with I-70 parallel a short distance to the west. US 40 comes to a westbound exit to westbound I-70 and an eastbound entrance from eastbound I-70, at which point it turns east and becomes a four-lane divided highway. The road enters the city of Frederick and curves southeast. At this point, the route becomes West Patrick Street and passes businesses, coming to an intersection with the eastern terminus of US 40 Alt. US 40 turns back to the east and widens to six lanes, passing south of the former Frederick Towne Mall as it continues through a commercial strip known as the "Golden Mile" before coming to a partial cloverleaf interchange with the US 15 freeway. At this interchange, West Patrick Street continues east as a municipal street while US 40 heads south concurrent with US 15 on the four-lane Frederick Freeway. The median of the freeway widens as it passes between office buildings to the west and residential areas to the east. The freeway median narrows again as it curves southeast and comes to a partial cloverleaf interchange with Jefferson Street and the northern terminus of US 340, where US 15 splits from US 40 by heading southwest concurrent with US 340. From here, US 40 continues southeast along the Frederick Freeway past commercial development before it comes to an interchange with I-70 and the northern terminus of I-270.

At this point, the freeway continues southeast as part of I-270 while US 40 heads east to follow I-70 along the Baltimore National Pike, a six-lane freeway. The freeway heads east through business areas and passes south of Nymeo Field at Harry Grove Stadium, the home ballpark of the Frederick Keys baseball team, before crossing under MD 355 and coming to a single-point urban interchange with MD 85. The road passes over the Frederick Branch of CSX's Old Main Line Subdivision railroad line before it comes to a partial cloverleaf interchange with South Street and Monocacy Boulevard and a partial interchange with MD 144. Past this interchange, I-70/US 40 passes through fields before it leaves Frederick upon crossing the Monocacy River. The freeway runs near suburban residential development and woodland, curving southeast and coming to a partial interchange with the eastern terminus of the Frederick section of MD 144 in Bartonsville, with no eastbound exit. Past this interchange, the road continues east through wooded areas with some fields and development, with Old National Pike parallel a short distance to the north. I-70/US 40 passes south of the town of New Market and comes to a diamond interchange with MD 75 that serves the town. The freeway heads east through woodland with some farmland and nearby residential development, with Old National Pike parallel to the north and CSX's Old Main Line Subdivision parallel to the south. The road passes an eastbound weigh station and winds east, crossing over the railroad tracks before it reaches an eastbound truck rest area. I-70/US 40 comes to a partial cloverleaf interchange with MD 27 that serves the town of Mount Airy to the north, at which point it enters Carroll County. Past this interchange, the freeway runs through wooded areas between CSX's Old Main Line Subdivision to the north and MD 144 to the south, curving southeast and crossing the South Branch Patapsco River.

=== Howard County ===
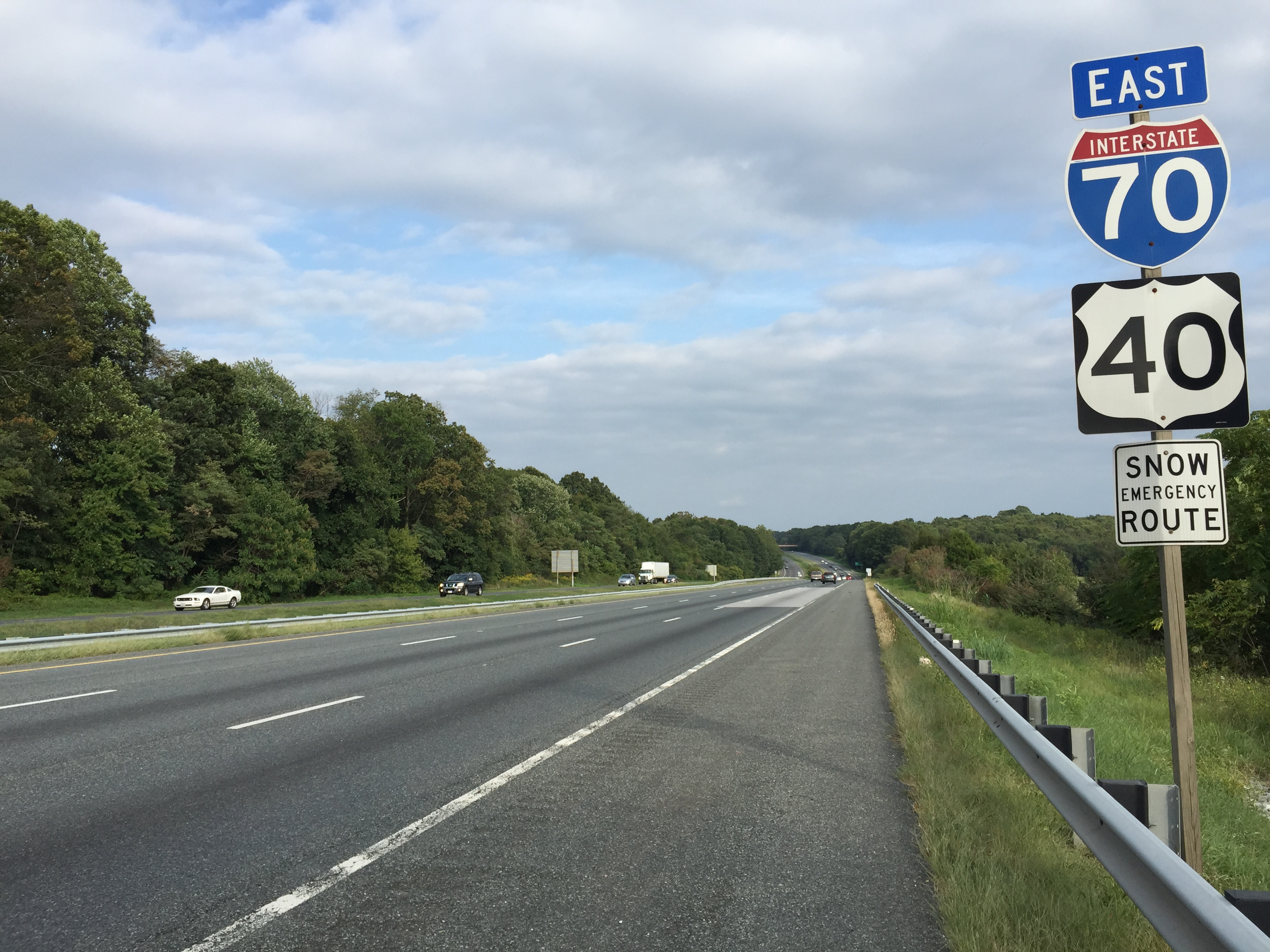
View east along I-70/US 40 (Baltimore National Pike) near Lisbon

Upon crossing the South Branch Patapsco River, I-70/US 40 enters Howard County and continues east-southeast along the Baltimore National Pike freeway through wooded areas with some fields and development, with Old Frederick Road parallel to the north and MD 144 parallel to the south. Farther east, Old Frederick Road and MD 144 continue parallel a further distance from the freeway before the freeway comes to a diamond interchange with MD 94 in Lisbon. Past this interchange, the road continues through rural land with some development and comes to the exit for MD 97 in Cooksville. I-70/US 40 runs east through a mix of farmland and woodland with some residential development, coming to a westbound weigh station. The freeway passes north of the Howard County Fairgrounds before it reaches a diamond interchange with MD 32 in West Friendship. Past this interchange, the road continues east through rural land and homes before US 40 splits from I-70 for the final time at an eastbound exit and westbound entrance.

Upon splitting from I-70, US 40 continues southeast along Baltimore National Pike, a four-lane at-grade divided highway. The road passes through wooded areas with some residential development as it heads into Ellicott City and comes to an intersection with the eastern terminus of the section of MD 144 running between Mount Airy and Ellicott City. At this point, the road curves east and passes businesses, with Frederick Road splitting to the southeast, before it crosses the Little Patuxent River in a wooded area and runs near suburban residential neighborhoods. The route widens to six lanes and passes through a shopping district with numerous restaurants as it comes to an interchange with the US 29 freeway. Past this interchange, US 40 turns northeast and passes more businesses, crossing Rogers Avenue before the eastbound side becomes paralleled by a service road that is designated MD 984. The section of US 40 through Ellicott City is designated "Korean Way" and contains several Korean American businesses. The road narrows to four lanes and continues northeast through wooded residential neighborhoods. The route heads into forested areas in Patapsco Valley State Park and comes to a right-in/right-out access point to the Hollofield Area of the state park before it turns southeast and passes over the Patapsco River valley on a bridge.

=== Baltimore City and County ===
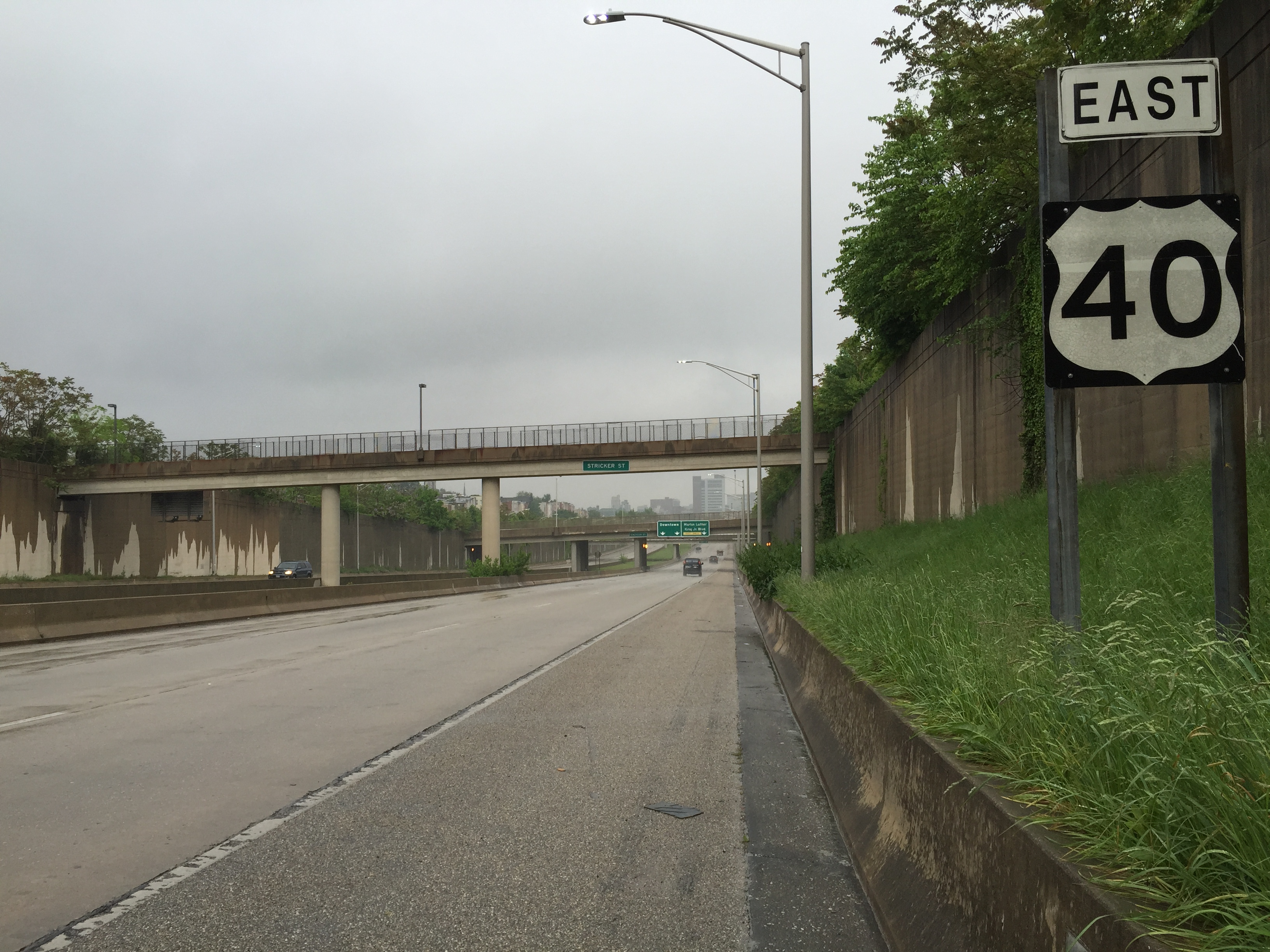
View east along the cancelled I-170 (now US 40) in Baltimore City

Upon crossing the Patapsco River, US 40 enters Baltimore County and continues southeast along Baltimore National Pike through more forested areas of Patapsco Valley State Park before leaving the state park. The road heads into Catonsville, where it widens to six lanes and passes through a commercial strip of shopping centers and varieties of car dealerships and fast-food restaurants, curving to the east. The route crosses Rolling Road and turns to the east-northeast, continuing past a mix of homes and businesses. US 40 comes to an interchange with I-695 (Baltimore Beltway) and heads south of the Westview Shopping Center as it continues east through commercial areas. Farther east, the road passes through a mix of residential neighborhoods and shopping centers.

US 40 leaves Baltimore County and enters the city of Baltimore, where it becomes maintained by the Baltimore Department of Transportation. The road continues east past homes in West Baltimore and comes to a junction with Edmondson Avenue, where the Baltimore National Pike name ends and the road name becomes Edmondson Avenue. A short distance later, the route intersects Cooks Lane. From here, the road heads east past commercial establishments and passes north of Edmondson-Westside High School and New Cathedral Cemetery before it continues into urban areas of rowhouses with some businesses. US 40 comes to an interchange with the western terminus of US 40 Truck at Hilton Parkway before it passes over CSX's Hanover Subdivision railroad line and Gwynns Falls. Following this, the route passes north of Western Cemetery before it turns southeast onto West Franklin Street. The road curves back to the east and continues between rowhouses to the north and commercial areas to the south. US 40 splits into the one-way pair of West Mulberry Street eastbound and Franklin Street westbound, carrying three lanes in each direction, and passes under Amtrak's Northeast Corridor railroad line at the West Baltimore station serving MARC's Penn Line. A short distance later, the route heads east onto a four-lane freeway stub located in a depressed alignment between West Mulberry Street and West Franklin Street, which serve as frontage roads; this freeway stub was formerly I-170. Along this freeway alignment, US 40 passes under US 1, which also uses a one-way pair of North Fulton Avenue northbound and North Monroe Street southbound, and is accessed via an eastbound exit and westbound entrance with the frontage roads. The freeway widens to six lanes as it continues east, coming to an interchange with Martin Luther King Jr. Boulevard.

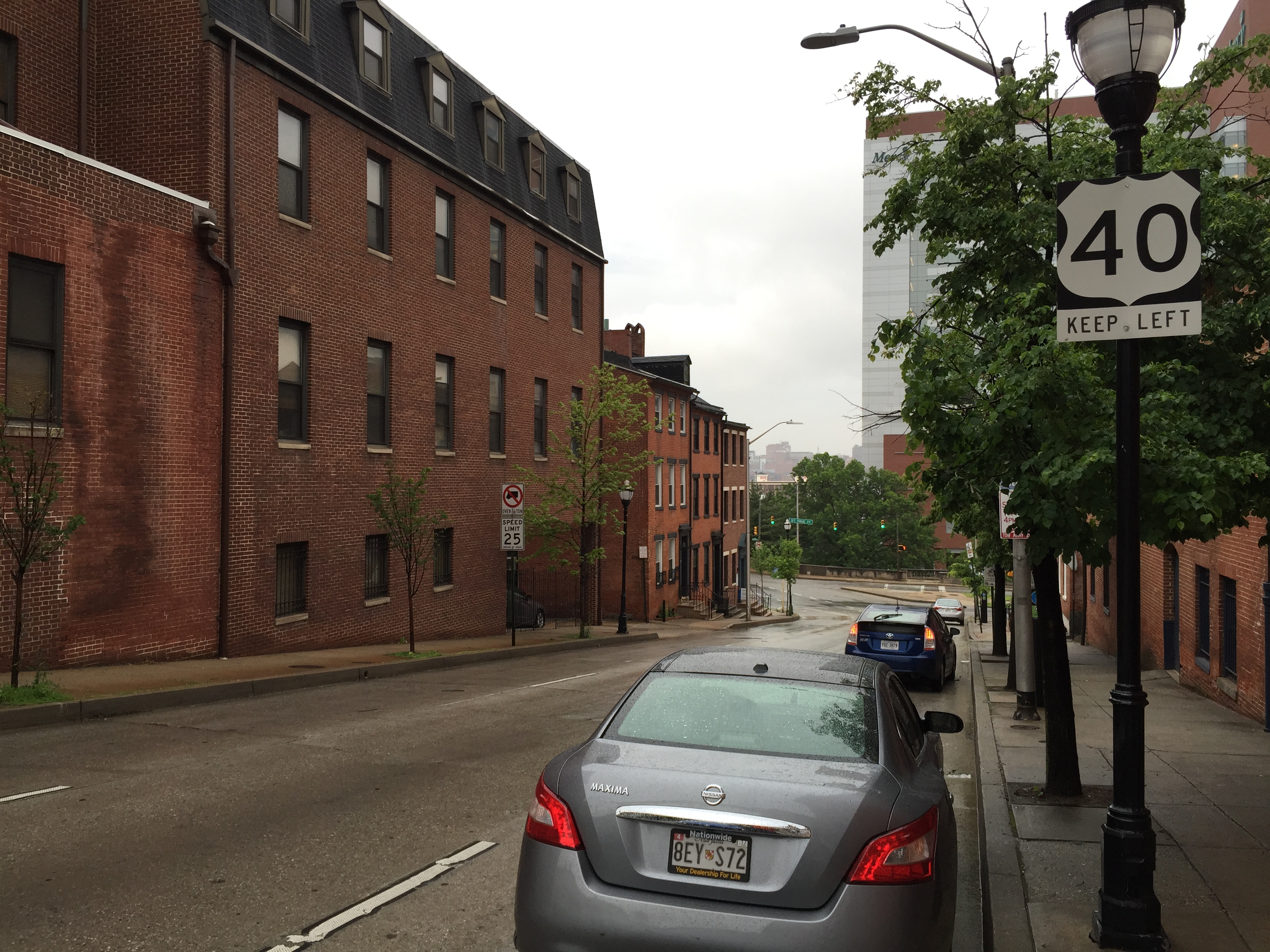
View east along US 40 in downtown Baltimore City

After this, the freeway ends and US 40 resumes along the one-way pair of West Mulberry Street eastbound and West Franklin Street westbound, carrying three lanes in each direction. The route intersects the northern terminus of MD 295, which is routed along the one-way pair of North Paca Street northbound and North Greene Street southbound, and the southern terminus of MD 129, which is routed along the one-way pair of North Paca Street northbound and Pennsylvania Avenue southbound. From here, US 40 passes south of the Seton Hill Historic District as it heads into the Mount Vernon neighborhood north of downtown Baltimore and continues east, crossing MTA Maryland's Baltimore Light RailLink at North Howard Street. The route crosses North Charles Street, at which point the name changes to East Mulberry Street eastbound and East Franklin Street westbound. US 40 intersects the southbound direction of MD 2 at St. Paul Street before both directions rejoin along Orleans Street, a six-lane undivided road. The route heads onto the Orleans Street Viaduct, passing over the northbound direction of MD 2 (North Calvert Street) and I-83 (with no access) in the Jones Falls stream valley. After this, the road becomes a divided highway and runs through urban areas of homes and businesses in East Baltimore, heading south of Paul Laurence Dunbar High School before passing through the campus of The Johns Hopkins Hospital. Past the hospital, US 40 becomes a four-lane undivided road and continues past rowhouses and some businesses. Farther east, the route intersects Pulaski Highway and heads east-northeast along four-lane undivided Pulaski Highway, passing through commercial areas with some urban homes. The road intersects the western terminus of MD 150 at Haven Street before it passes under an abandoned railroad line and then Amtrak's Northeast Corridor. The route continues through industrial areas and passes under CSX's Baltimore Terminal Subdivision railroad line before it widens to a six-lane divided highway and reaches a partial cloverleaf interchange with MD 151 (Erdman Avenue) and the eastern terminus of US 40 Truck that also includes a ramp to southbound I-895 accessible from eastbound US 40. A short distance later, US 40 crosses I-895, with a ramp from northbound I-895 to eastbound US 40. The road continues northeast through commercial areas and comes to a partial interchange with Moravia Road, with no eastbound entrance. Past this, US 40 reaches a partial interchange with I-95, with a ramp from westbound US 40 to southbound I-95 and a ramp from northbound I-95 to eastbound US 40; the missing movements are provided via Moravia Road and I-895.

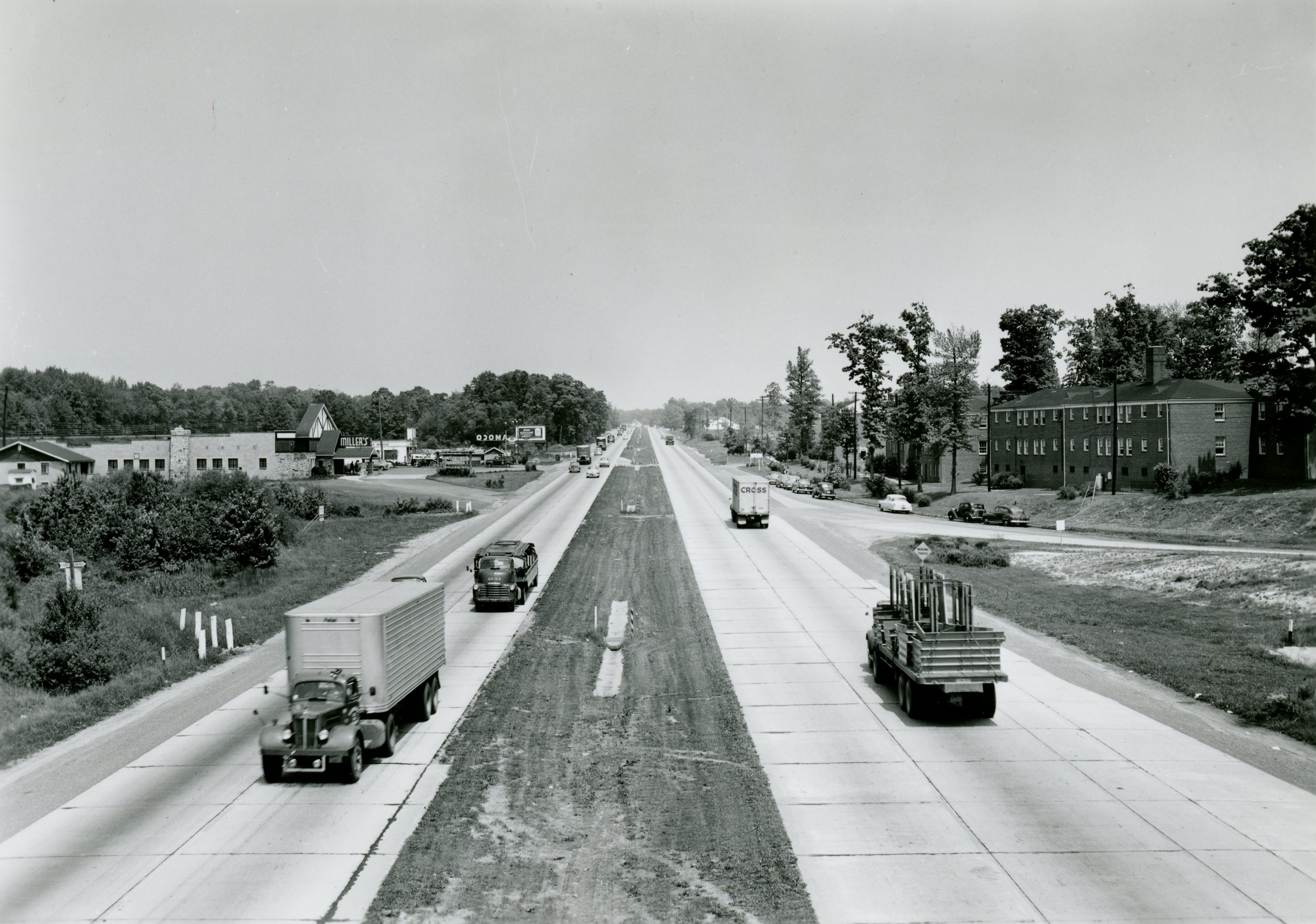
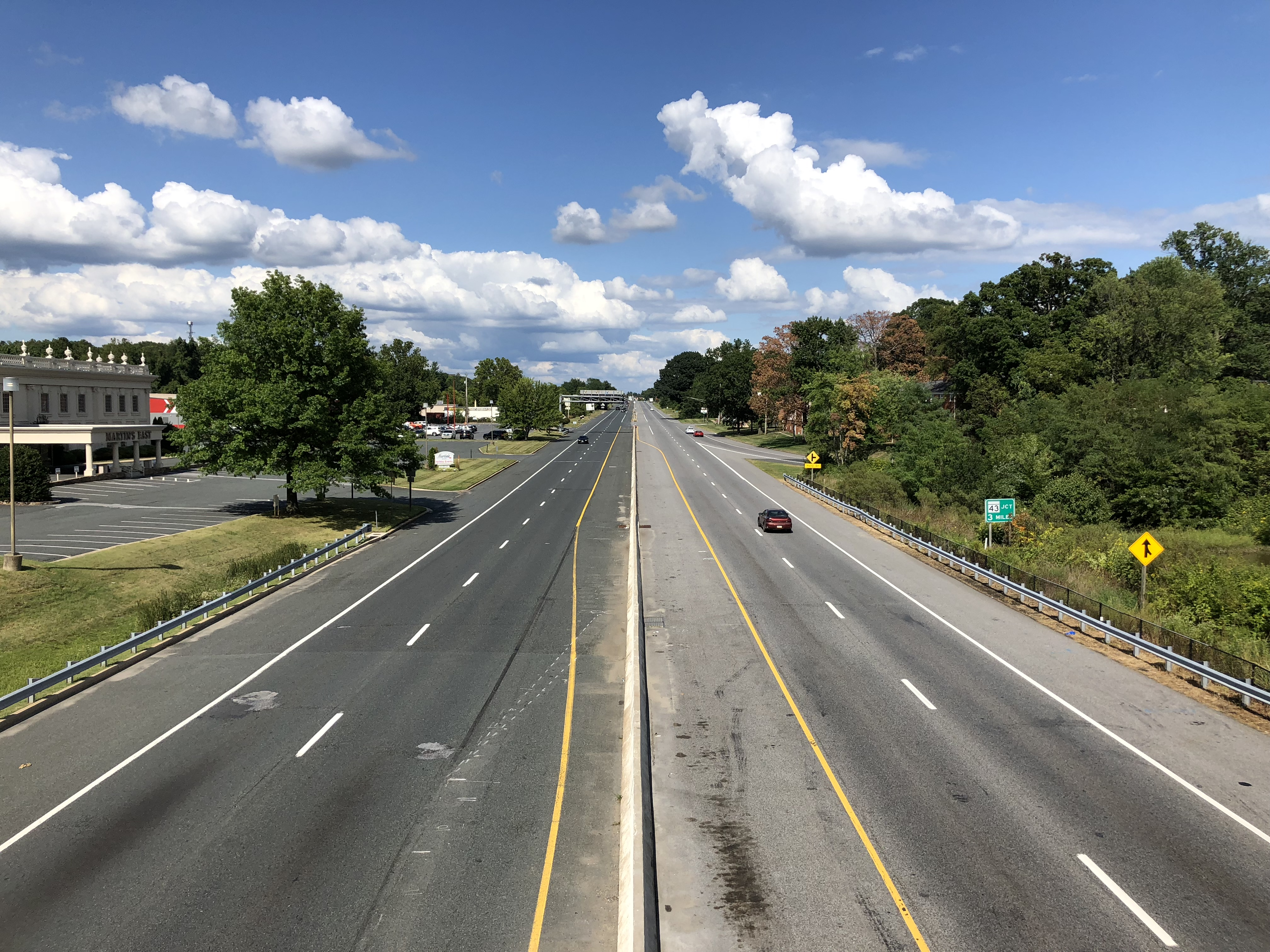
US 40 from Martin Boulevard (MD 700) interchange overpass. Left photo from May 1953; right photo from August 2019

US 40 leaves Baltimore and crosses back into Baltimore County, where it becomes maintained by the state again. The route continues northeast along Pulaski Highway into Rosedale, passing businesses and coming to an intersection with the western terminus of MD 7 (Philadelphia Road). The divided highway narrows to four lanes and passes through suburban commercial areas with some homes. US 40 comes to a cloverleaf interchange with I-695 (Baltimore Beltway), where it widens to six lanes, and heads southeast of The Centre at Golden Ring shopping center as it continues past businesses. The road enters Middle River and passes near industrial parks, curving east to come to a bridge over CSX's Philadelphia Subdivision railroad line. The route turns back to the northeast and reaches an interchange with the northern terminus of MD 700 (Martin Boulevard). US 40 narrows to four lanes and continues northeast through a mix of wooded areas and commercial development, with the railroad tracks parallel a short distance to the northwest. The roadway widens to six lanes as it passes through a business area. The road narrows back to four lanes and heads into White Marsh, coming to an interchange with MD 43 (White Marsh Boulevard) in an area of woodland. The MD 43 interchange consists of a two-way quadrant ramp between the two routes and a ramp from southbound US 40 to westbound MD 43. Past this interchange, the route runs through a mix of woods and businesses. Farther northeast, US 40 heads through forests near a section of Gunpowder Falls State Park and crosses Gunpowder Falls. The road passes between commercial development to the northwest and wooded areas to the southeast before it comes to a bridge over Little Gunpowder Falls.

=== Harford County ===
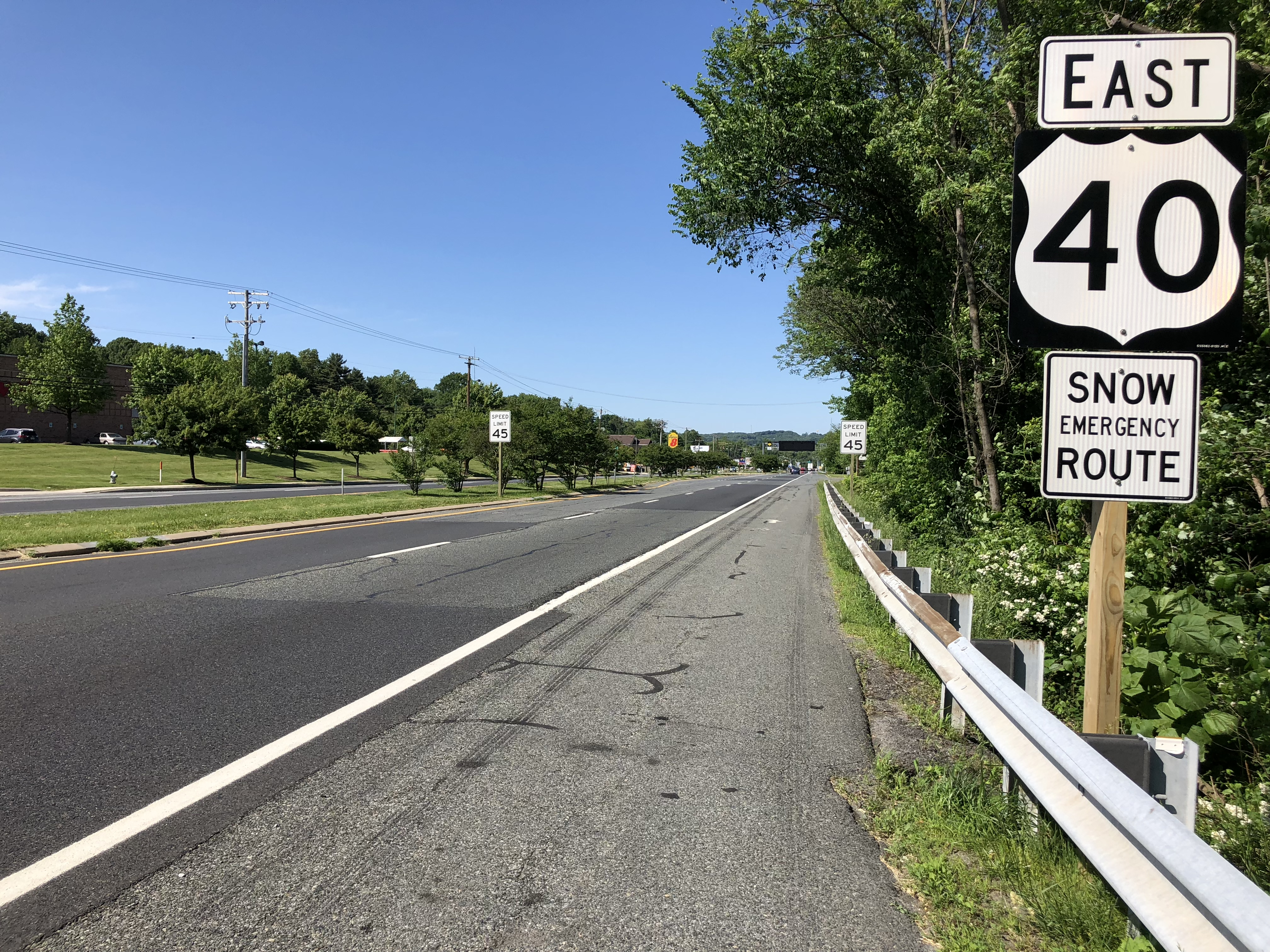
US 40 eastbound in Havre de Grace

Upon crossing Little Gunpowder Falls, US 40 enters Harford County and continues northeast along Pulaski Highway, with CSX's Philadelphia Subdivision parallel a short distance to the northwest. The route runs through business areas with some woods, curving east and passing through the community of Joppa. The road comes to an intersection with MD 152 and continues into Edgewood, heading through more commercial areas. US 40 reaches a junction with the northern terminus of MD 755, which heads south to provide access to MD 24. Past this junction, the route heads into wooded areas and passes under MD 24 and over Winters Run before it curves northeast and intersects a two-way ramp that connects to MD 24. The road runs past businesses before it heads through wooded areas between the closely parallel CSX line to the northwest and a branch of the Bush River to the southeast. US 40 passes through forests before it heads past a mix of homes and businesses in Abingdon. The road crosses the Bush River and continues between the railroad tracks to the northwest and the river to the southeast as it runs through wooded areas. The route heads northwest of an office park before it passes under MD 543 and then intersects the southern terminus of that route in Riverside, with MD 543 making a 180-degree turn to intersect US 40. Following this, US 40 runs between the CSX line to the northwest and a mix of woods and homes to the southeast before crossing Grays Run, where the name changes to South Philadelphia Boulevard. The road heads further from the railroad tracks and passes through a mix of woodland and commercial development. The route comes to an intersection with the eastern terminus of the section of MD 7 that began near Baltimore and the northern terminus of MD 159.

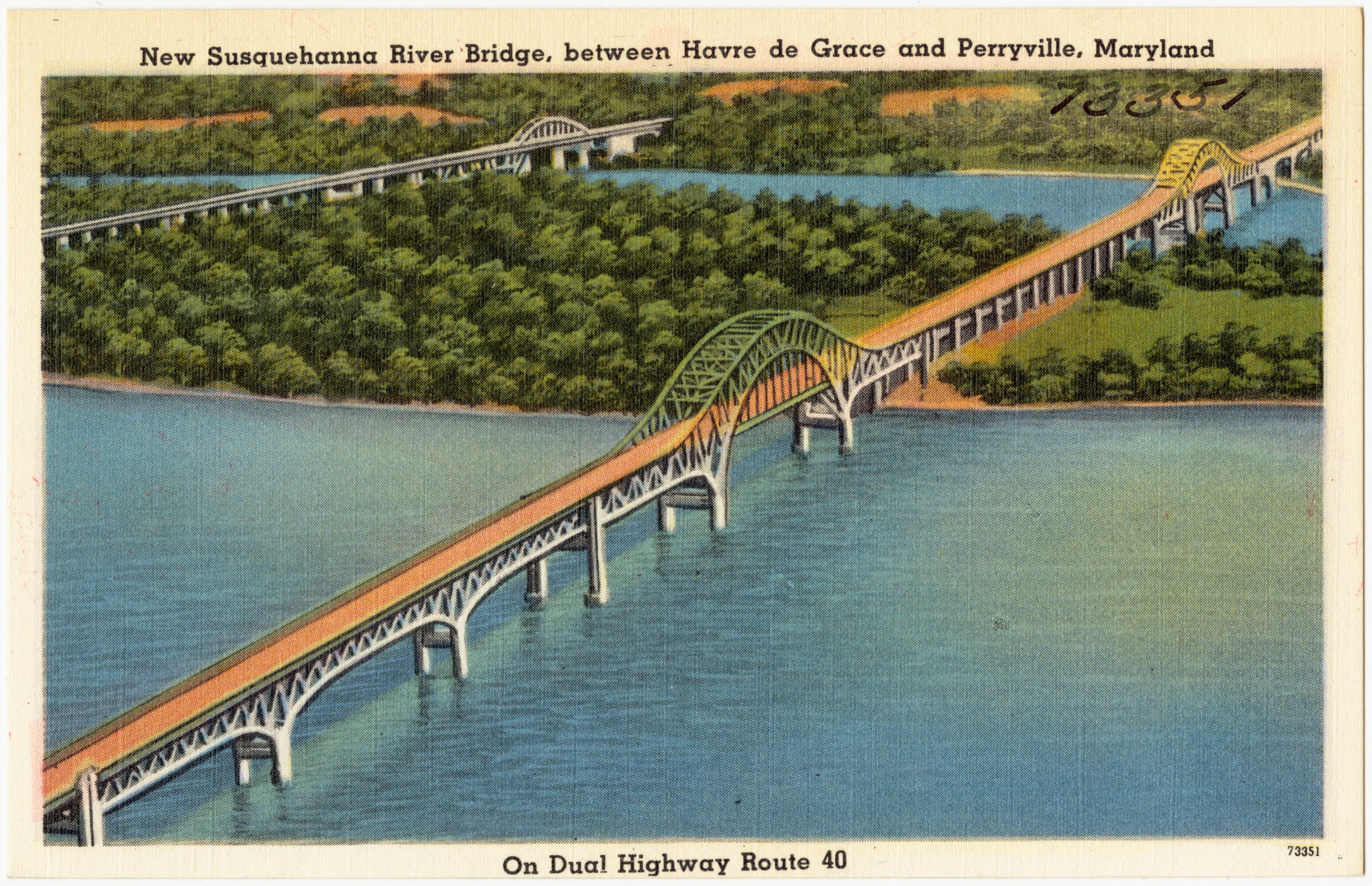
Postcard of the Thomas J. Hatem Memorial Bridge, carrying US 40 across the Susquehanna River

Past this intersection, US 40 enters the city of Aberdeen and passes through commercial areas and some woods before it reaches an interchange with the northern terminus of MD 715, which provides access to an entrance to Aberdeen Proving Ground, and Hickory Drive. Following this interchange, the road becomes lined with businesses and curves to the north-northeast. The route runs a short distance to the west of Amtrak's Northeast Corridor and becomes paralleled by a service road to the west, which is designated MD 740B east of Plater Street. In the center of Aberdeen, US 40 comes to an intersection with MD 132 west of the Aberdeen station along the Northeast Corridor that serves Amtrak and MARC's Penn Line. Following this intersection, the route becomes North Philadelphia Boulevard and continues past a mix of homes and businesses. The road turns northeast and comes to an interchange with MD 22, which heads southeast to an entrance to Aberdeen Proving Ground. Past this interchange, US 40 leaves Aberdeen and runs through woodland with some development between CSX's Philadelphia Subdivision to the northwest and Amtrak's Northeast Corridor to the southeast. Upon crossing Swan Creek, the road name changes back to Pulaski Highway. The route intersects the eastern terminus of MD 132 and continues through business areas with some woods sandwiched between the two parallel railroad lines, passing the entrance to Bulle Rock Golf Course. Farther northeast, US 40 enters the city of Havre de Grace and comes to an intersection with the western terminus of a section of MD 7 that passes through the center of Havre de Grace and serves the Havre de Grace Historic District. The route heads north-northeast past businesses and some woodland, with the parallel railroad tracks heading further away. The road reaches an intersection with the eastern terminus of the MD 7 section through Havre de Grace and the eastern terminus of MD 155 as it continues past commercial development. US 40 heads onto the Thomas J. Hatem Memorial Bridge, a bridge maintained by the Maryland Transportation Authority that crosses the Susquehanna River. Upon ascending onto the bridge, the route comes to the eastbound all-electronic toll gantry and passes over MD 763 before heading northeast across the Susquehanna River.

=== Cecil County ===
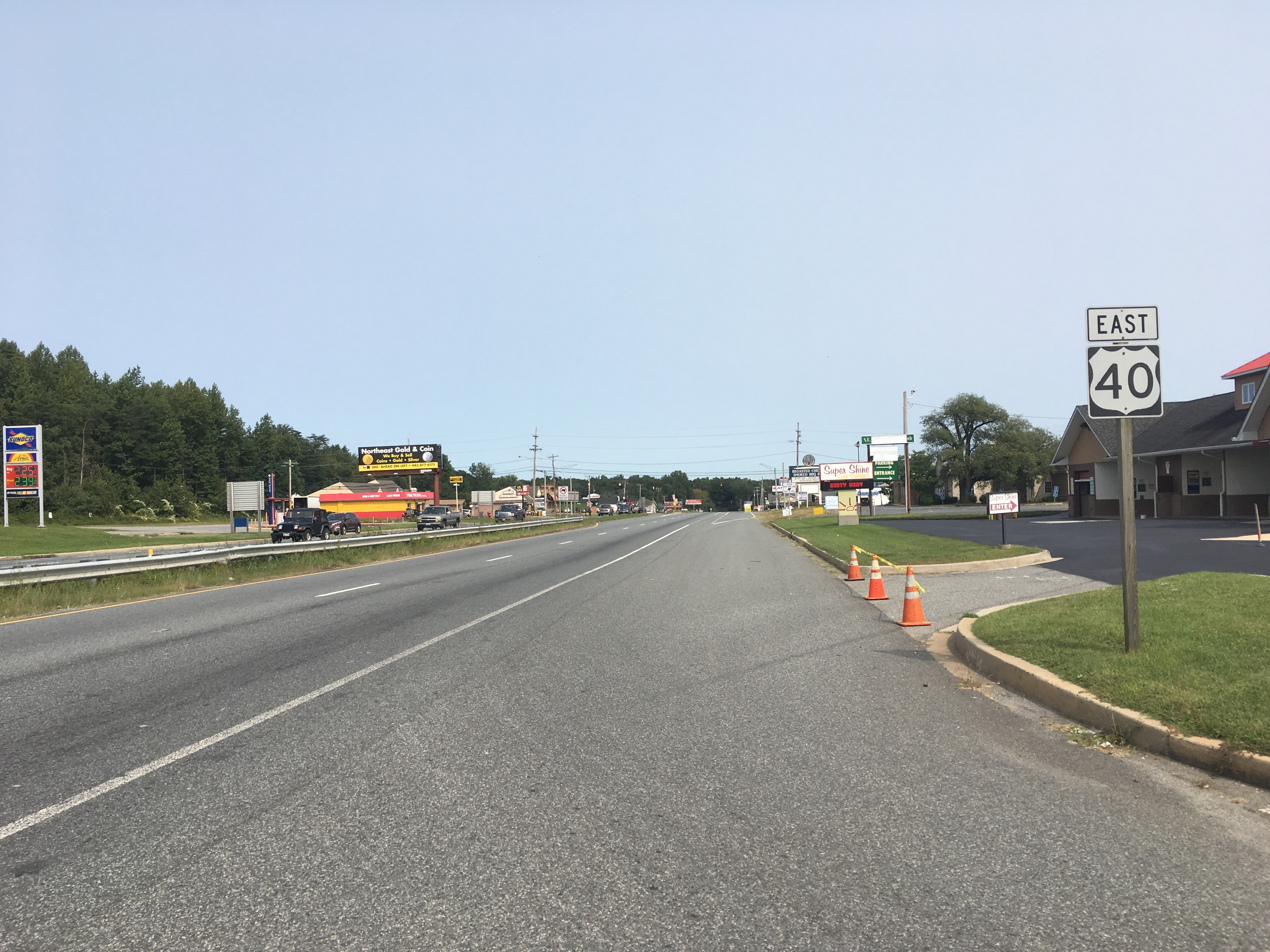
US 40 eastbound past MD 272 in North East

While crossing the Susquehanna River, US 40 enters Cecil County and passes over forested Garrett Island before heading across more of the river. Upon reaching the east bank of the Susquehanna River, the route enters the town of Perryville and passes over residential areas and Norfolk Southern's Port Road Branch railroad line before descending off the Thomas J. Hatem Memorial Bridge, where it passes a pair of weigh stations. US 40 becomes state-maintained again and follows four-lane divided Pulaski Highway northeast to an intersection with MD 222. Following this, the road passes through business areas with some woodland to the south. The route becomes paralleled by CSX's Philadelphia Subdivision to the north for a short distance before it passes east-northeast between commercial development to the north and residential areas to the south. US 40 leaves Perryville and continues through a mix of farm fields and woods with some commercial development, coming to an intersection with the eastern terminus of a section of MD 7 that serves Perryville. The route passes a pair of abandoned weigh stations as it runs through a mix of woods and sand quarries, with another section of MD 7 splitting to the southeast. The road continues northeast and passes north of a sand quarry as it continues through forested areas with some residential and commercial development including warehouses.

US 40 approaches the town of North East and heads into business areas, reaching an intersection with MD 272. It briefly passes through a sliver of North East as it passes more development before it curves east, crossing North East Creek and Little North East Creek in a wooded area. The road passes near a cluster of businesses near the Mechanics Valley Road junction and continues east through forested areas with some residential and commercial development. Farther east, US 40 reaches an intersection with the eastern terminus of the section of MD 7 passing through North East and the southern terminus of MD 279. Past this intersection, the route heads into the town of Elkton and curves east-southeast, passing over Little Elk Creek and Amtrak's Northeast Corridor in a wooded area. The road runs through commercial areas with some homes before it comes to a bridge over Big Elk Creek in woodland. US 40 heads into business areas, crossing MD 213 and curving east at the White Hall Road intersection. The route turns to the north-northeast and passes commercial development with some woodland, coming to a junction with the eastern terminus of a section of MD 7 that leads into the center of Elkton. US 40 heads through business areas and intersects the southern terminus of MD 781 before it reaches the Delaware state line, where US 40 continues into that state along Pulaski Highway.

== History ==
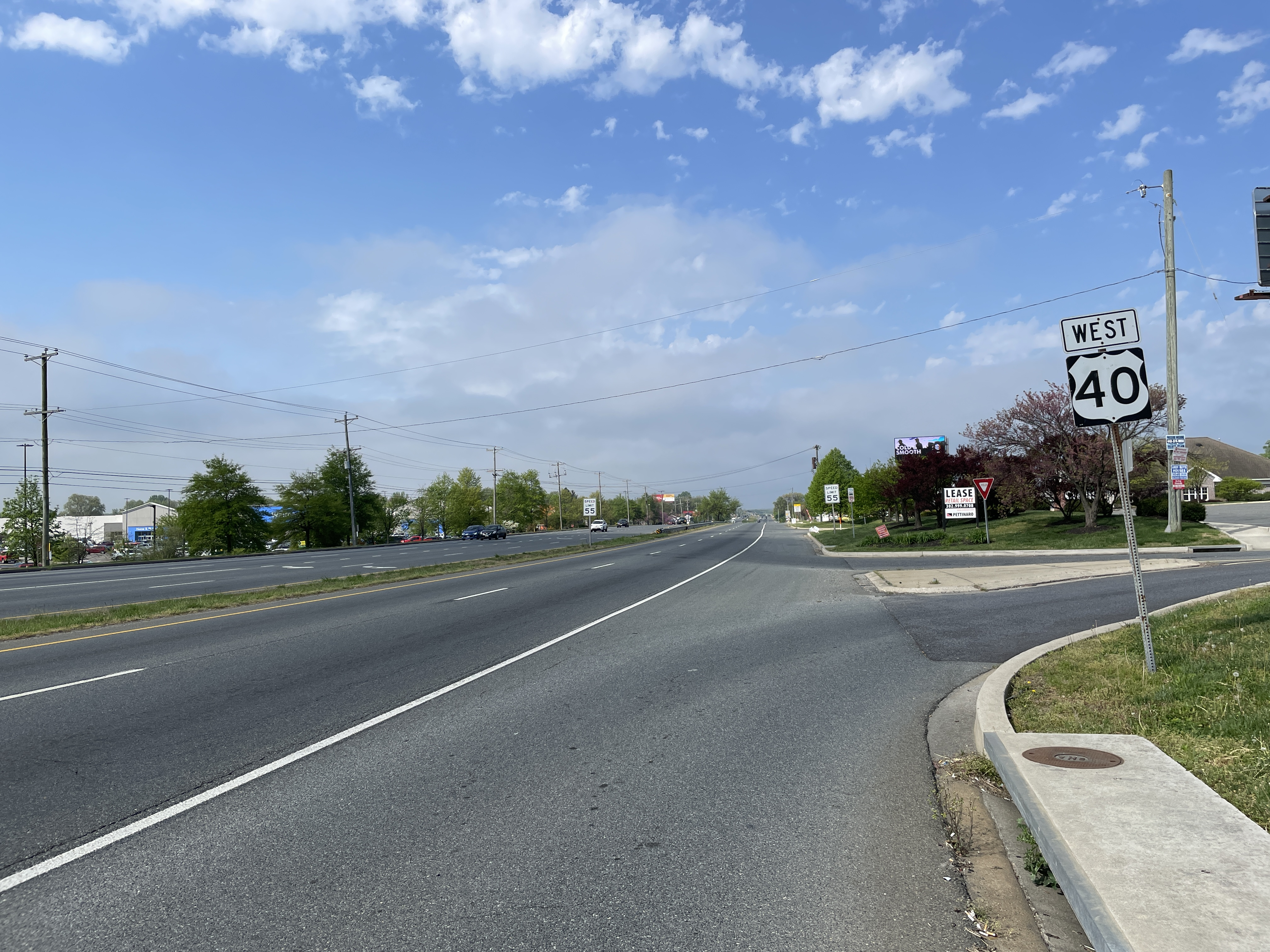
US 40 westbound past MD 781 in Elkton

The National Road was opened from Cumberland on the Potomac River and the terminus of the parallel Chesapeake and Ohio Canal coming from Georgetown in the newly established national capital of Washington, D.C., going west and northwest into Pennsylvania, and beyond to Wheeling, Virginia on the Ohio River, southwest of Pittsburgh at the point of the Forks of the Ohio, in the 1810s. The turnpikes constructed and now operated by private stockholder companies connecting Cumberland east to Baltimore operated as the Cumberland Turnpike (Cumberland to Conococheague, chartered 1812, and not to be confused with an alternate name for the National Road), the Hagers-Town and Conococheague Turnpike (Conococheague to Hagerstown, chartered 1817), the Hager's-Town and Boonsborough Turnpike (Hagerstown to Boonsboro, chartered 1819), and the Baltimore and Frederick-town Turnpike (Boonsboro through Frederick to Baltimore, chartered 1805), completed in 1824. These feeders of the National Road were collectively called the Bank Road, since they were financed largely by Maryland banks. To the east of Baltimore, the Baltimore and Havre-de-Grace Turnpike, chartered in 1813 and opened 1825, went northeast from Baltimore to Havre de Grace on the west bank of the Susquehanna River, and public roads continued from Perryville, across the Susquehanna River on its east bank from Havre de Grace to Elkton near the "Head of Elk" on the Elk River at the northern end of the Chesapeake Bay, and thence into Delaware. Of all the aforementioned roads, few still carry US 40 today.

West of Baltimore, the National Road and the Bank Road were incorporated into the National Old Trails Road in the mid-1910s. East of Havre-de-Grace, the road became part of the Capitol Trail linking Philadelphia and Atlanta via Washington, though it took a more northerly route than the modern route to service Bel Air via MD 22 and US 1. In 1926, the designation of US 40 superseded both of these routes.

As traffic increased through the early 20th century, new roadway bypassed the original highways, with the old alignments receiving new monikers. With the construction of the Pulaski Highway east of Baltimore, the old alignment became MD 7. By 1939, a bypass of Ellicott City had been constructed, signed as US 40 Bypass. In 1948, the two alignments were swapped, with the old highway becoming US 40 Alternate, and with the construction of a new freeway to Lisbon, both old alignments became part of MD 144. By 1948, a new alignment had also been built from Frederick to Hagerstown, and the old alignment became the current US 40 Alternate. With the construction of I-70 and I-68, the existing segments of US 40 at freeway standards (the road from Frederick to Baltimore, the road west of Hancock, and the bypass of US 40 Scenic constructed in 1965) were incorporated into the new interstates. The sections of at-grade highway bypassed by I-68 had US 40 rerouted off of them onto the new interstate, with the section from Cumberland to Keyser's Gate becoming a new US 40 Alternate, with remaining sections becoming an extension of MD 144.

From 1960 to 1969, plans for an East-West Expressway, which was to be a continuation of I-70N into the city before ending as a segment of I-95, called for part of it to be built in the Franklin-Mulberry corridor, which was then the one-way couplet for US 40. In 1969, the East-West Expressway was scrapped and replaced with a new, differently-routed spur numbered as I-170, which did get built in the same corridor, but was cancelled by 1989. As a result, US 40 was rerouted onto the 1.39-mile (2.24 km) freeway, with Mulberry and Franklin streets acting as local frontage roads.

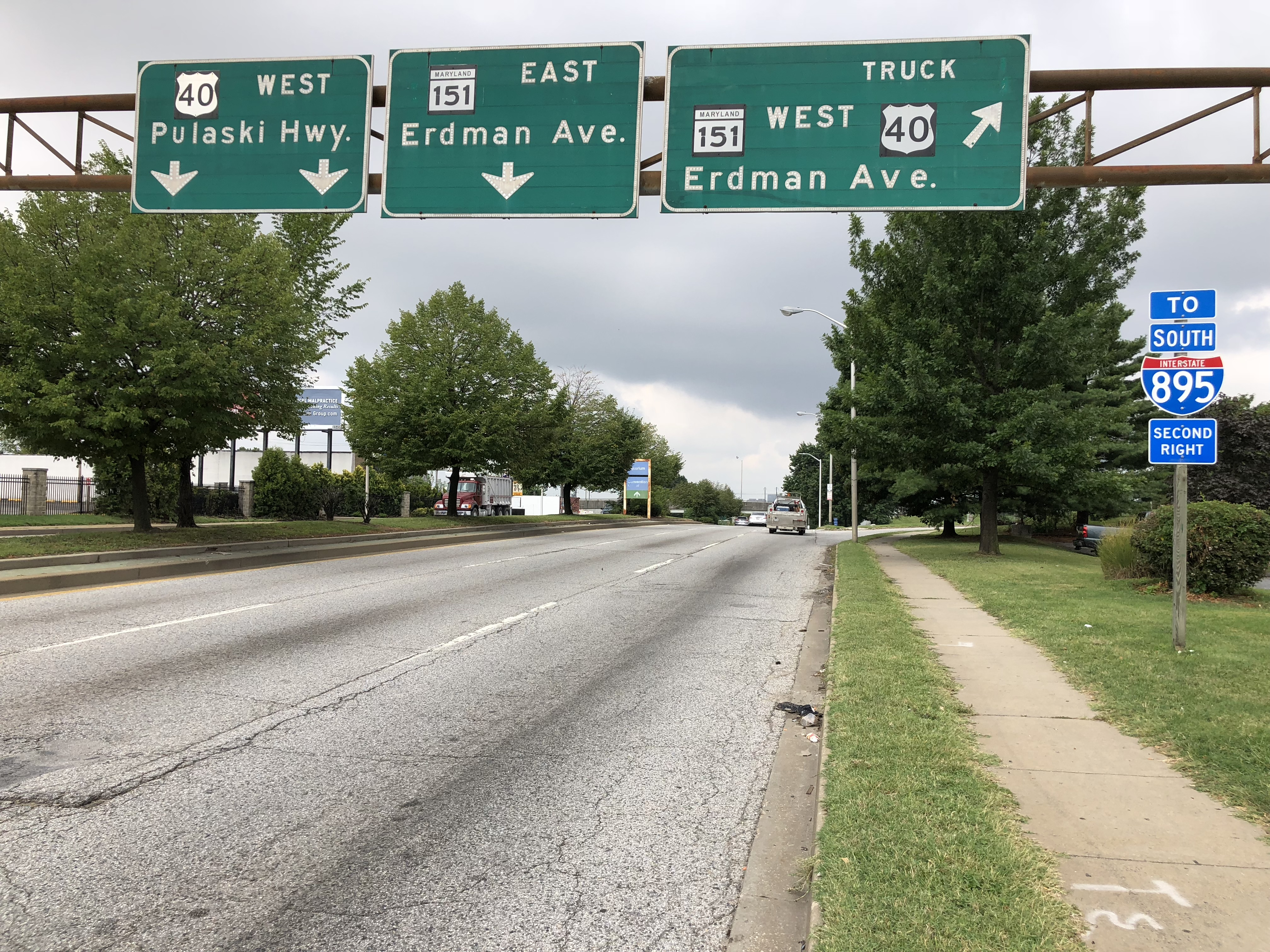
US 40 westbound at MD 151 in Baltimore

The long arches of the US 40 bridge over the upper / western branches of the Patapsco River in Ellicott City, originally constructed in 1936, were replaced in a project that started in the spring of 2011 and was expected to be completed in 2013. During the bridge replacement, temporary parallel bridges were constructed to serve traffic for the first time in a major bridge project in Maryland.

As part of the east–west Red Line light rail project that was cancelled in 2015 by new Governor of Maryland Larry Hogan and then revived in 2023 by his successor Wes Moore, segments of Edmondson Avenue and Franklin Street on the west side of the city are to be widened to allow construction of the future east–west light rail line inside the median area. The Red Line will also utilize the median of the short US 40 expressway stub (formerly planned for the cancelled extension of I-70) along the Franklin Street - Mulberry Street corridor in West Baltimore.

In December 2016, Governor Hogan designated the portion of US 40 through Ellicott City as "Korean Way", paying homage to the many Korean American businesses and residents of Howard County.

=== Racial segregation ===
Prior to the 1960s, racial segregation was legal by law in Maryland, where all public establishments enforced segregation under the Jim Crow laws. African Americans traveling along US 40 in Maryland were routinely denied service at establishments such as hotels, shops, and restaurants; in his book Ready for Revolution, Black civil rights activist Stokely Carmichael wrote that he "developed a deep hatred—one shared by many—for Route 40" after being regularly denied service at restaurants along the route.

In June 1961, the Chadian ambassador to the U.S., Adam Malick Sow, was denied service by a white-owned diner by US 40 near Edgewood, which sparked an international incident and made headline news in Africa and Asia. After Sow informed President John F. Kennedy of the incident, the federal government, which viewed such incidents as a foreign policy embarrassment amidst the Cold War, began pressuring Maryland business owners to start serving African diplomats. In response to news of segregation along US 40, the Congress of Racial Equality started picketing along the route, and in 1963 Maryland passed legislation outlawing racial discrimination in public establishments, which was described by professor James Karmel as the "first state civil rights act".

== Junction list ==
| County | Location | mi | km | Exit | Destinations | Notes |
|---|---|---|---|---|---|---|
| Garrett | | 0.00 | 0.00 | | US 40 west / Historic National Road – Uniontown | Pennsylvania state line; western terminus of US 40 in Maryland |
| Garrett | Keyser's Ridge | 3.41 | 5.49 | | US 40 Alt. east / Historic National Road – Grantsville, Cumberland | |
| Garrett | Keyser's Ridge | 3.74 | 6.02 | 14 | I-68 west (National Freeway) / US 219 south (Garrett Highway) – Morgantown, Oakland | Split into exits 14A (US 219) and 14B (US 40); west end of concurrencies with I-68 and US 219 |
| Garrett | Grantsville | 9.12 | 14.68 | 19 | MD 495 (Bittinger Road) – Grantsville, Swanton | |
| Garrett | | 12.18 | 19.60 | 22 | US 219 north / US 219 Bus. north (Chestnut Ridge Road) – Meyersdale, PA | East end of concurrency with US 219; southern terminus of US 219 Bus. |
| Garrett | | 13.90 | 22.37 | 24 | Lower New Germany Road (MD 948D) | |
| Garrett | Finzel | 19.70 | 31.70 | 29 | MD 546 (Finzel Road) – Finzel | |
| Allegany | Frostburg | 23.24 | 37.40 | 34 | Midlothian Road (MD 736) – Frostburg | |
| Allegany | Frostburg | 24.93 | 40.12 | 36 | MD 36 (New Georges Creek Road) – Frostburg, Westernport | |
| Allegany | La Vale | 29.12 | 46.86 | 39 | US 40 Alt. (National Highway) – La Vale | No exit eastbound; eastbound entrance ramp is from MD 53 |
| Allegany | La Vale | 29.85 | 48.04 | 40 | US 220 Truck south (Vocke Road) | No entrance westbound; Vocke Road is unsigned MD 658 |
| Allegany | Cumberland | 31.46 | 50.63 | 41 | Seton Drive to MD 49 | Westbound exit only |
| Allegany | Cumberland | 32.24 | 51.89 | 42 | US 220 south (McMullen Highway) / Greene Street north – McCoole, Keyser, WV | West end of concurrency with US 220 |
| Allegany | Cumberland | 33.51 | 53.93 | 43A | Johnson Street – Ridgeley, WV | Eastbound exit and entrance |
| Allegany | Cumberland | 33.51 | 53.93 | 43A | Beall Street – Ridgeley, WV | No eastbound exit |
| Allegany | Cumberland | 33.80 | 54.40 | 43B | MD 51 south (Industrial Boulevard) – Airport | |
| Allegany | Cumberland | 33.82 | 54.43 | 43C | Downtown | |
| Allegany | Cumberland | 34.14 | 54.94 | 43D | Maryland Avenue | Right-in/right-out interchanges |
| Allegany | Cumberland | 34.77 | 55.96 | 44 | US 40 Alt. west (Baltimore Avenue) / MD 639 south (Willowbrook Road) / Historic National Road | |
| Allegany | Cumberland | 35.69 | 57.44 | 45 | Hillcrest Drive | Right-in/right-out interchanges with Rannells Road eastbound and Hillcrest Drive westbound, which are unsigned MD 952 and MD 952A, respectively |
| Allegany | Cumberland | 36.39 | 58.56 | 46 | MD 144 (Naves Cross Road) | Westbound exit and entrance |
| Allegany | Cumberland | 37.09 | 59.69 | 47 | US 220 north / MD 144 / Historic National Road – Bedford | Signed as exit 46 eastbound; east end of concurrency with US 220 |
| Allegany | | 41.18 | 66.27 | 50 | Pleasant Valley Road (MD 948AD) – Rocky Gap State Park | |
| Allegany | | 42.42 | 68.27 | 52 | MD 144 east (National Pike) | Eastbound exit, westbound entrance |
| Allegany | Flintstone | 45.87 | 73.82 | 56 | MD 144 (National Pike) – Flintstone | Westbound ramps are with MD 948AM |
| Allegany | | 52.84 | 85.04 | 62 | US 40 Scenic (Fifteen Mile Creek Road) | |
| Allegany | | 54.11 | 87.08 | 64 | M.V. Smith Road (MD 948AL) | |
| Allegany | | 58.64 | 94.37 | 68 | Orleans Road (MD 948Z) | |
| Allegany | | 61.56 | 99.07 | 72 | US 40 Scenic (National Pike) / High Germany Road / Swain Road | West end of concurrency with US 40 Scenic; High Germany Road is unsigned MD 948Y |
| Washington | | 63.51 | 102.21 | 74 | US 40 Scenic east (National Pike) / Mountain Road | Eastbound exit, westbound entrance; Mountain Road is unsigned MD 903; east end of concurrency with US 40 Scenic |
| Washington | | 67.07 | 107.94 | 77 | US 40 Scenic west (National Pike) / MD 144 east (Western Pike) / Woodmont Road | |
| Washington | Hancock | 71.01 | 114.28 | 82 1 | I-70 west (Eisenhower Memorial Highway) / US 522 – Breezewood, Hancock, Winchester | Split into exits 82A (US 522), 82B (I-70 / US 40), and 82C (I-70 / US 522) eastbound; split into exits 1A (I-68 / US 40) and 1B (US 522 south) westbound; eastern terminus of I-68; west end of concurrency with I-70 |
| Washington | Hancock | 73.50 | 118.29 | 3 | MD 144 (Main Street) / Historic National Road / C&O Canal Byway – Hancock | No westbound entrance |
| Washington | | 74.40 | 119.74 | 5 | MD 615 (Millstone Road) | Eastbound exit, westbound entrance |
| Washington | | 75.85 | 122.07 | 5 | MD 615 (Millstone Road) | Westbound exit, eastbound entrance |
| Washington | Indian Springs | 79.17 | 127.41 | 9 | I-70 east (Eisenhower Memorial Highway) / C&O Canal Byway – Hagerstown | Eastbound exit from and westbound entrance to I-70; east end of concurrency with I-70 |
| Washington | Clear Spring | 86.57 | 139.32 | | MD 68 east (Mill Street) to I-70 – Williamsport | |
| Washington | | 88.97 | 143.18 | | MD 57 north (St. Paul Road) | |
| Washington | Huyett | 93.51 | 150.49 | | MD 63 (Greencastle Pike) to I-70 – Cearfoss, Williamsport | |
| Washington | Hagerstown | 94.75 | 152.49 | | MD 144 east (Washington Street) | |
| Washington | Hagerstown | 96.23 | 154.87 | | I-81 (Maryland Veterans Memorial Highway) to I-70 – Roanoke, Harrisburg | I-81 Exit 6 |
| Washington | Hagerstown | 96.61 | 155.48 | | MD 910 south (Western Maryland Parkway) | Officially MD 910C |
| Washington | Hagerstown | 97.63 | 157.12 | | US 11 (Burhans Boulevard) | |
| Washington | Hagerstown | | | | Historic National Road (Potomac Street) | To US 40 Alt |
| Washington | Hagerstown | 98.68 | 158.81 | | MD 64 east (Cleveland Avenue) – Smithsburg | |
| Washington | Hagerstown | 101.72 | 163.70 | | I-70 (Eisenhower Memorial Highway) to I-81 – Hancock, Frederick | I-70 Exit 32 |
| Washington | Beaver Creek | 104.53 | 168.22 | | MD 66 (Mapleville Road) to I-70 – Smithsburg, Boonsboro | |
| Frederick | Myersville | 111.03 | 178.69 | | MD 17 (Wolfsville Road) – Middletown | |
| Frederick | Braddock Heights | 118.41 | 190.56 | | I-70 west (Eisenhower Memorial Highway) – Hagerstown | I-70 Exit 48; westbound exit, eastbound entrance |
| Frederick | Frederick | 119.68 | 192.61 | | US 40 Alt. west / Historic National Road – Braddock Heights, Middletown | No direct access from eastbound US 40 to westbound US 40 Alternate or from eastbound US 40 Alternate to westbound US 40 |
| Frederick | Frederick | 121.09 | 194.88 | 13 | US 15 north (Frederick Freeway) / Historic National Road (Patrick Street east) – Gettysburg | split into exits 13A (Patrick Street) and 13B (US 40 west); west end of concurrency with US 15 |
| Frederick | Frederick | 121.82 | 196.05 | 12 | US 15 south / US 340 west (Jefferson National Pike) / Jefferson Street east – Leesburg, Charles Town | East end of concurrency with US 15 |
| Frederick | Frederick | 122.44 | 197.05 | 53 | I-70 west / I-270 south (Eisenhower Memorial Highway) – Hagerstown, Washington | Split into exits 53A (I-270) and 53B (US 40 west); west end of concurrency with I-70 |
| Frederick | Frederick | 123.60 | 198.91 | 54 | MD 85 (Buckeystown Pike) to MD 355 / Market Street | Single-point urban interchange |
| Frederick | Frederick | 124.15 | 199.80 | 55 | South Street | Westbound ramps are with Monocacy Boulevard |
| Frederick | Frederick | 124.68 | 200.65 | 56 | MD 144 (Patrick Street) | No westbound entrance |
| Frederick | Bartonsville | 128.04 | 206.06 | 59 | MD 144 west (National Road) – Linganore, Ijamsville | |
| Frederick | New Market | 131.75 | 212.03 | 62 | MD 75 (Green Valley Road) – Libertytown, Hyattstown | |
| Carroll | Mount Airy | 137.19 | 220.79 | 68 | MD 27 (Ridge Road) – Mount Airy, Damascus | |
| Howard | Lisbon | 142.58 | 229.46 | 73 | MD 94 (Woodbine Road) – Lisbon, Woodbine | |
| Howard | Cooksville | 145.75 | 234.56 | 76 | MD 97 (Hoods Mill Road) – Westminster, Olney | |
| Howard | West Friendship | 149.42 | 240.47 | 80 | MD 32 (Sykesville Road) – Sykesville, Clarksville | |
| Howard | West Friendship | 151.54 | 243.88 | 82 | I-70 east – Baltimore | Eastbound exit from and westbound entrance to I-70; east end of concurrency with I-70 |
| Howard | Ellicott City | 154.13 | 248.05 | | MD 144 west (Frederick Road) / Historic National Road | |
| Howard | Ellicott City | | | | Historic National Road (Frederick Road) | |
| Howard | Ellicott City | 157.10 | 252.83 | | US 29 (Columbia Pike) to I-70 – Columbia, Frederick | US 29 Exit 24 |
| Howard | Ellicott City | 159.25 | 256.29 | | Patapsco Valley State Park Hollofield Area | Right-in/right-out interchanges in both directions |
| Baltimore | Catonsville | 162.28 | 261.16 | | I-695 (Baltimore Beltway) – Glen Burnie, Towson | I-695 Exit 15 |
| Baltimore City | | 165.93 | 267.04 | | US 40 Truck east (Hilton Parkway) / Hilton Parkway south | Cloverleaf interchange |
| Baltimore City | | 167.31 | 269.26 | | Mulberry Street east to US 1 (Monroe Street/Fulton Avenue) | Eastbound exit, westbound entrance (from Franklin Street) |
| Baltimore City | | 168.36 | 270.95 | | Martin Luther King Jr. Boulevard | Diamond interchange |
| Baltimore City | | 168.57 | 271.29 | | MD 295 south (Greene Street) | Greene Street is one-way southbound |
| Baltimore City | | 168.64 | 271.40 | | MD 129 north (Paca Street) | Paca Street is one-way northbound |
| Baltimore City | | 169.02 | 272.01 | | Charles Street north | Charles Street is one-way northbound |
| Baltimore City | | 169.09 | 272.12 | | MD 2 south (St. Paul Street) | No access to northbound MD 2 |
| Baltimore City | | 171.86 | 276.58 | | MD 150 east (Haven Street) | |
| Baltimore City | | 172.59 | 277.76 | | MD 151 (Erdman Avenue) / US 40 Truck west / I-895 south (Harbor Tunnel Thruway) | Cloverleaf interchange; movements from eastbound US 40 to northbound MD 151 and from northbound MD 151 to eastbound US 40 made via Armistead Way; I-895 Exit 13 |
| Baltimore City | | 173.58 | 279.35 | | Moravia Road to I-895 / I-95 north | No eastbound entrance |
| Baltimore City | | 173.76 | 279.64 | | I-95 south – Washington | I-95 Exit 61; ramps from westbound US 40 to southbound I-95 and northbound I-95 to eastbound US 40 |
| Baltimore | Rosedale | 174.12 | 280.22 | | MD 7 east (Philadelphia Road) | |
| Baltimore | Rosedale | 176.63 | 284.26 | | I-695 (Baltimore Beltway) / Golden Ring Road north – Essex, Towson | I-695 Exit 35 |
| Baltimore | Middle River | 177.96 | 286.40 | | MD 700 south (Martin Boulevard) | Trumpet interchange |
| Baltimore | White Marsh | 180.84 | 291.03 | | MD 43 (White Marsh Boulevard) to I-95 | Two-way ramp between US 40 and MD 43 plus a ramp from westbound US 40 to westbound MD 43 |
| Harford | Joppatowne | 187.54 | 301.82 | | MD 152 (Magnolia Road/Mountain Road) to I-95 | |
| Harford | Edgewood | 189.21 | 304.50 | | MD 755 south (Edgewood Road) to Edgewood Road north south / MD 24 | |
| Harford | Edgewood | 189.78 | 305.42 | | To MD 24 (Vietnam Veterans Memorial Highway) – Edgewood, Bel Air | Two-way ramp between US 40 and MD 24 is MD 24D (Otter Creek Ramp) |
| Harford | Riverside | 193.93 | 312.10 | | MD 543 north (Riverside Parkway) to I-95 | |
| Harford | Aberdeen | 196.13 | 315.64 | | MD 7 west / MD 159 south (Old Philadelphia Road) | |
| Harford | Aberdeen | 196.94 | 316.94 | | MD 715 south (Short Lane) / Hickory Drive – Aberdeen Proving Ground | Trumpet interchange |
| Harford | Aberdeen | 198.52 | 319.49 | | MD 132 (Bel Air Avenue) | Officially MD 132B |
| Harford | Aberdeen | 199.03 | 320.31 | | MD 22 (Aberdeen Thruway) to I-95 – Aberdeen Proving Ground, Bel Air | Partial cloverleaf interchange |
| Harford | Havre de Grace | 200.28 | 322.32 | | MD 132 west (Oakington Road) | |
| Harford | Havre de Grace | 201.72 | 324.64 | | MD 7 east (Revolution Street) – Havre de Grace | Officially MD 7A |
| Harford | Havre de Grace | 203.10 | 326.86 | | MD 7 west (Otsego Street) / MD 155 west (Ohio Street) to I-95 / Otsego Street west – Havre de Grace, Churchville | Officially MD 7A; last eastbound exit before toll |
| Susquehanna River | | 203.41– 204.90 | 327.36– 329.75 | Thomas J. Hatem Memorial Bridge (eastbound toll; E-ZPass or pay-by-plate) | | |
| Cecil | Perryville | 205.21 | 330.25 | | MD 222 (Perryville Road/Aiken Avenue) to I-95 – Port Deposit, Perryville | |
| Cecil | | 207.98 | 334.71 | | MD 7 west (Principio Furnace Road) – Perryville | Officially MD 7B |
| Cecil | | 208.45 | 335.47 | | MD 7 east (Old Philadelphia Road) – Charlestown, North East | Officially MD 7C |
| Cecil | North East | 212.33 | 341.71 | | MD 272 (Mauldin Avenue/North East Road) to I-95 – Cecil College, Bay View, North East, Charlestown | |
| Cecil | Elkton | 217.43 | 349.92 | | MD 7 west (Old Philadelphia Road) / MD 279 north (Elkton Road) to I-95 – North East, Newark | Officially MD 7C |
| Cecil | Elkton | 218.91 | 352.30 | | MD 213 (Bridge Street/Augustine Herman Highway) – Elkton, Chesapeake City | |
| Cecil | Elkton | 220.25 | 354.46 | | MD 7 west (Delaware Avenue) – Elkton | Officially MD 7D |
| Cecil | Elkton | 221.08 | 355.79 | | MD 781 north (Delancy Road) | |
| Cecil | Elkton | 221.31 | 356.16 | | US 40 east (Pulaski Highway) – Glasgow | Delaware state line; eastern terminus of US 40 in Maryland |
1.000 mi = 1.609 km; 1.000 km = 0.621 mi: Concurrency terminus; Electronic toll collection; Incomplete access

== See also ==
U.S. Route 40
| Previous state: Pennsylvania | Maryland | Next state: Delaware |
