= Indian Springs, Maryland =

Unincorporated community in Maryland, United States

- Unincorporated community
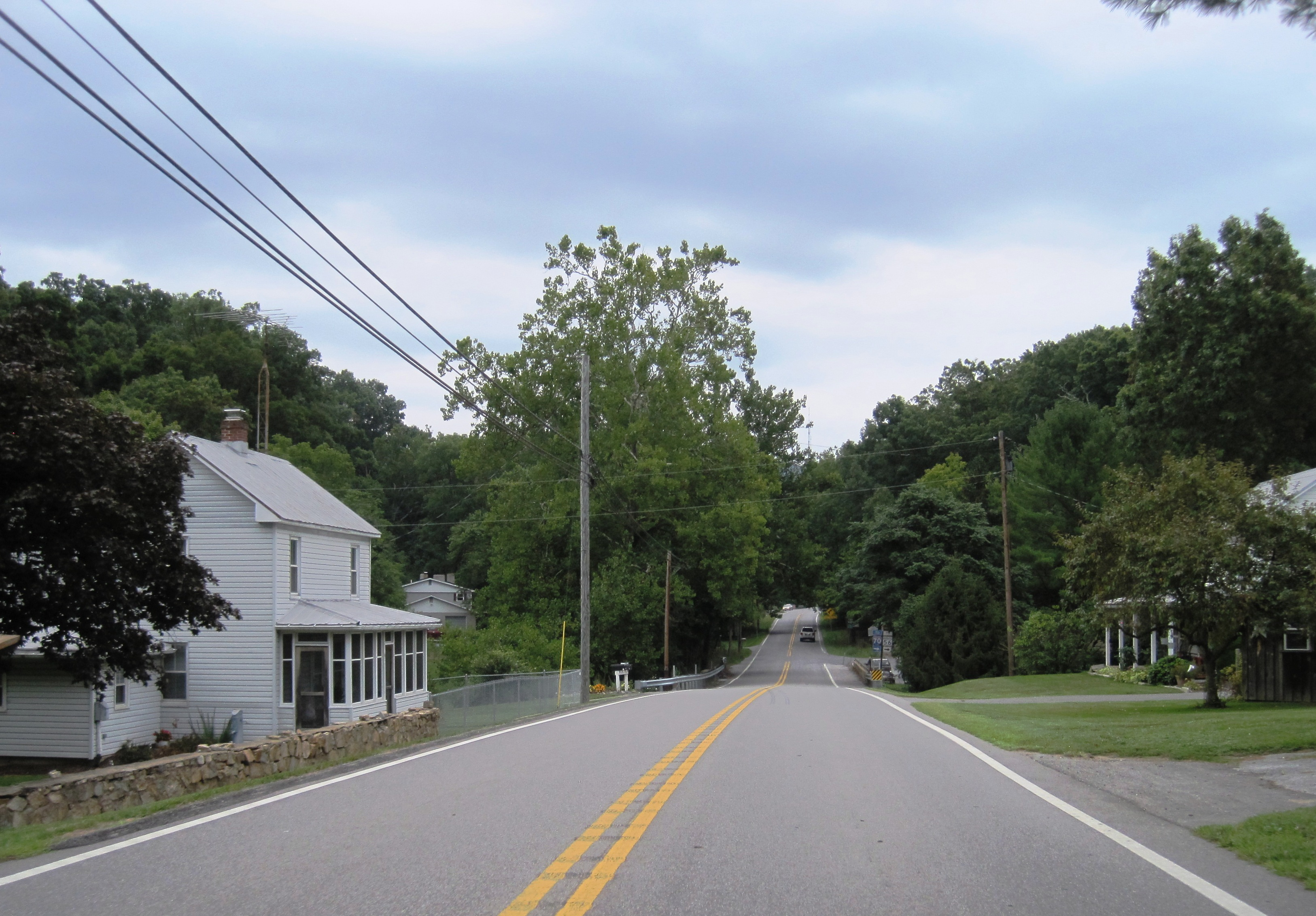
- Eastbound US 40 in Indian Springs

- Location within Maryland Location within the United States
- Coordinates: 39°38′44″N 78°00′27″W
- Country: United States
- State: Maryland
- County: Washington

Area
  - Total: 0.12 sq mi (0.30 km^{2})
  - Land: 0.12 sq mi (0.30 km^{2})
  - Water: 0 sq mi (0.00 km^{2})
- Elevation: 528 ft (161 m)

Population (2020)
  - Total: 68
  - Density: 584.2/sq mi (225.58/km^{2})
- Time zone: UTC-5 (Eastern (EST))
  - Summer (DST): UTC-4 (EDT)
- ZIP code: 21711
- Area codes: 301, 240
- GNIS feature ID: 2583639

Indian Springs is an unincorporated community in western Washington County, Maryland, United States. Its population was 64 as of the 2010 census.

== Geography ==
Indian Springs lies along U.S. Route 40 and Maryland Route 56 between Clear Spring and Hancock; it is located north of Fort Frederick State Park. The community is approximately 20 miles (32 km) west of Hagerstown and is officially designated a part of the Hagerstown Metropolitan Area (Hagerstown-Martinsburg, Maryland-West Virginia Metropolitan Statistical Area).

The area is traditionally defined as encompassing the narrow tract of land north of U.S. Route 40 between Fairview Mountain and the Licking Creek.

Terrain in the area is generally rugged with elevations between 600 and 1,900 feet (180 and 580 m) above sea level, the landscape being primarily wooded. The terrain here differs greatly from the neighboring Hagerstown Valley, where elevations average less than 650 feet (200 m) and is characterized by fertile, gently rolling hills. While land for farming is not as readily available in the Springs area, orchards have been a source of local livelihood for centuries.

The Indian Springs watershed is serviced by four primary runs: Lanes, Rabble, Rattle, and Indian Springs. These runs are tributaries of nearby Licking Creek. The Indian Springs for which the area was named have their headwaters on the west flank of Fairview Mountain.

Two solutional caves are also reported to exist in this area. Revell's and Darby Caves are both said to be developed in the Tonoloway Formation, a thin-bedded dolomitic limestone of the upper Silurian.

Much of the land not held by private individuals is part of the Indian Springs State Wildlife Preserve and is open to the public. A local sportsman's club also owns land adjoining the preserve. Several companies and institutions maintain equipment located atop the larger hills, including Johns Hopkins University, Verizon, and local radio stations; trespassing is strictly prohibited.

== Demographics ==
Historical population
Census	Pop.	Note	%±
2020	68		—
U.S. Decennial Census

== Tourism ==
Indian Springs is located near the state-run Indian Springs Wildlife Management Area, a 6,400-acre (26 km^{2}) tract of forestry that draws tourists for fishing, hiking, and hunting. Fishing is popular at Blair's Valley Lake and hunting deer is famous in the wooded areas. Fairview Mountain, located in the WMA, once served as a Civil War military signal post.

Camping is also common in campgrounds such as Indian Springs Kampgrounds, Maryland, McCoys Ferry Campground, and Little Pool Campground.
