= Maryland Route 715 =

State highway in Maryland, United States

Maryland Route 715
- Short Lane

Route information
- Maintained by MDSHA
- Length: 1.06 mi (1.71 km)
- Existed: 1943–present

Major junctions
- West end: US 40 in Aberdeen
- East end: Entrance to Aberdeen Proving Ground

Location
- Country: United States
- State: Maryland
- Counties: Harford

Highway system
- Maryland highway system; Interstate; US; State; Scenic Byways
← MD 713	→ MD 717

Maryland Route 715 (MD 715) is a state highway in Harford County in the U.S. state of Maryland. Known as Short Lane, the state highway runs 1.06 miles (1.71 km) from U.S. Route 40 (US 40) in Aberdeen east to an entrance to Aberdeen Proving Ground. MD 715 was constructed during World War II as a military access project. Between 2010 and 2013, the state highway was reconstructed to better handle the increased traffic brought by the Base Realignment and Closure (BRAC) process.

== Route description ==
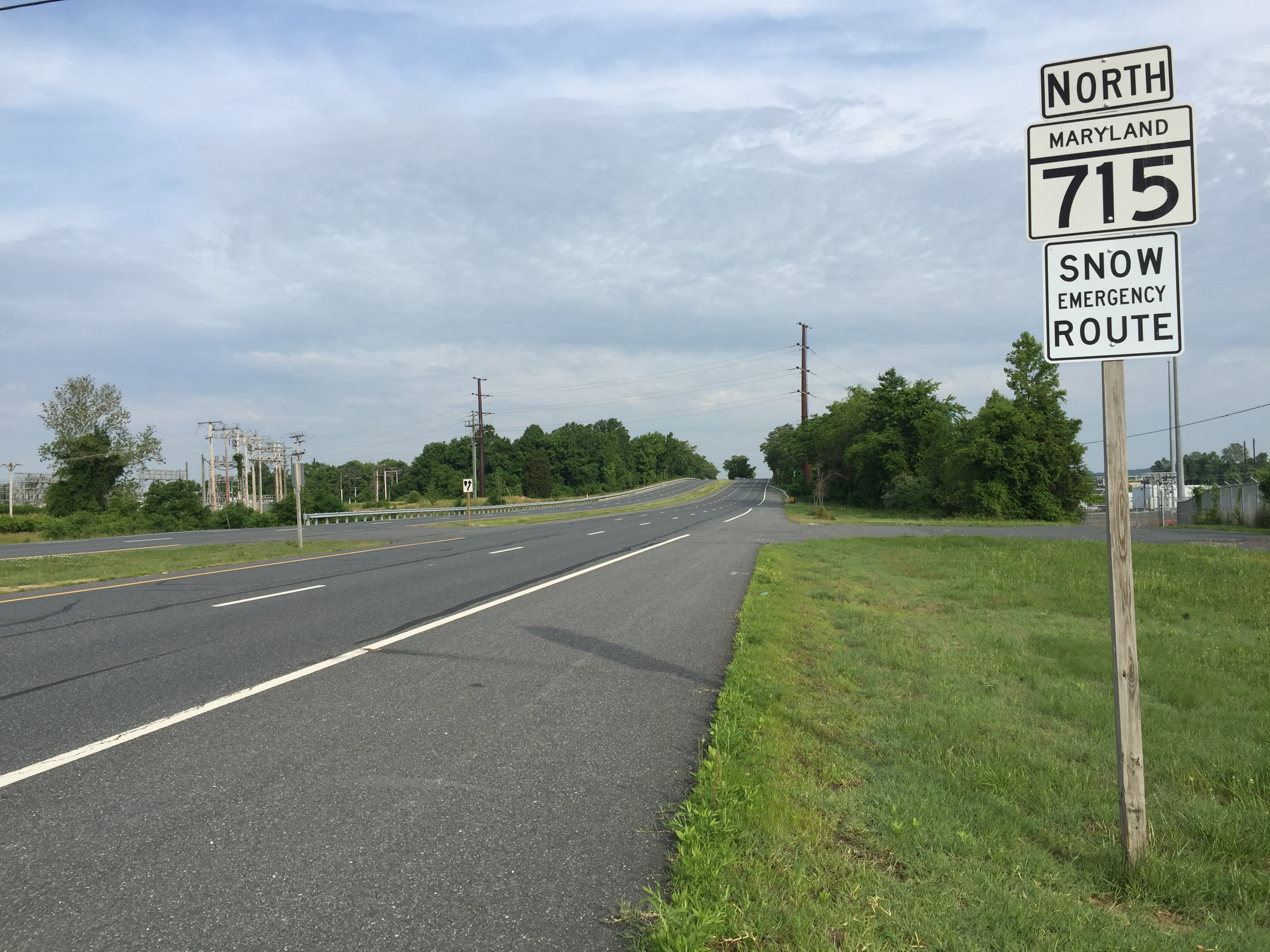
View north from the south end of MD 715 at the entrance to Aberdeen Proving Ground

MD 715 begins at a modified trumpet interchange with US 40 (Philadelphia Boulevard). The state highway heads east from US 40 as a six-lane divided highway that intersects Old Philadelphia Road and the entrance to an industrial park. MD 715 crosses over Amtrak's Northeast Corridor railroad line and MARC's Penn Line and passes north of the Visitor Center of Aberdeen Proving Ground as it reaches its eastern terminus at an entrance to Aberdeen Proving Ground. This gate is open 24 hours daily and allows entry for persons with a Government ID along with visitors without a Government ID. All visitors to the Aberdeen Area of Aberdeen Proving Ground must use this gate to enter. Past the gate, the road continues into the Aberdeen Proving Ground as Maryland Boulevard.

== History ==
MD 715 was constructed as a military access project under the Defense Highway Act of 1941 along the alignment of the Boothby Hill Road. The state highway, including the interchange with US 40 and the overpass of the railroad tracks, was completed as a divided highway in 1943 and marked as MD 715 by 1946. The bridges over US 40 and the railroad tracks were replaced or reconstructed in 1985.

MD 715 was reconstructed to handle the increased traffic at Aberdeen Proving Ground as a result of the BRAC process. The partial interchange at US 40 was expanded to a full interchange, the intersection with Old Philadelphia Road was improved, and MD 715 was expanded from four to six lanes. Construction began in October 2010 and concluded in 2013.

== Junction list ==
The entire route is in Aberdeen, Harford County.

mi	km	Destinations	Notes
0.00	0.00	US 40 (Philadelphia Boulevard) / Hickory Drive – Havre de Grace, Baltimore	Western terminus; modified trumpet interchange
0.51	0.82	Old Philadelphia Road	Old alignment of US 40; former MD 7
1.06	1.71	Entrance to Aberdeen Proving Ground	Eastern terminus
1.000 mi = 1.609 km; 1.000 km = 0.621 mi
