= Maryland Route 546 =

State highway in Maryland, United States

Maryland Route 546
- Finzel Road
- Maryland Route 546 highlighted in red

Route information
- Maintained by MDSHA
- Length: 3.61 mi (5.81 km)
- Existed: 1933–present

Major junctions
- South end: Beall School Road in Finzel
- I-68 / US 40 in Finzel; US 40 Alt. in Finzel; MD 946 in Finzel
- North end: SR 2010 in Finzel

Location
- Country: United States
- State: Maryland
- Counties: Garrett

Highway system
- Maryland highway system; Interstate; US; State; Scenic Byways
| ← MD 545 | → MD 547 |

Maryland Route 546 (MD 546) is a state highway in the U.S. state of Maryland. It is known as Finzel Road and covers a distance of 3.61 miles (5.81 km) from Beall School Road, situated south of an interchange with Interstate 68 (I-68) and U.S. Route 40 (US 40) in Finzel, which is located in northeastern Garrett County. The highway extends north to the Pennsylvania state line, where it continues as State Route 2010 (SR 2010) in Somerset County. MD 546 was constructed in the early 1930s. MD 946 used to follow the southern part, but its terminus was shifted west when I-68 was constructed in the early 1970s. In 2015, the route was extended a short distance south of the I-68 interchange.

== Route description ==
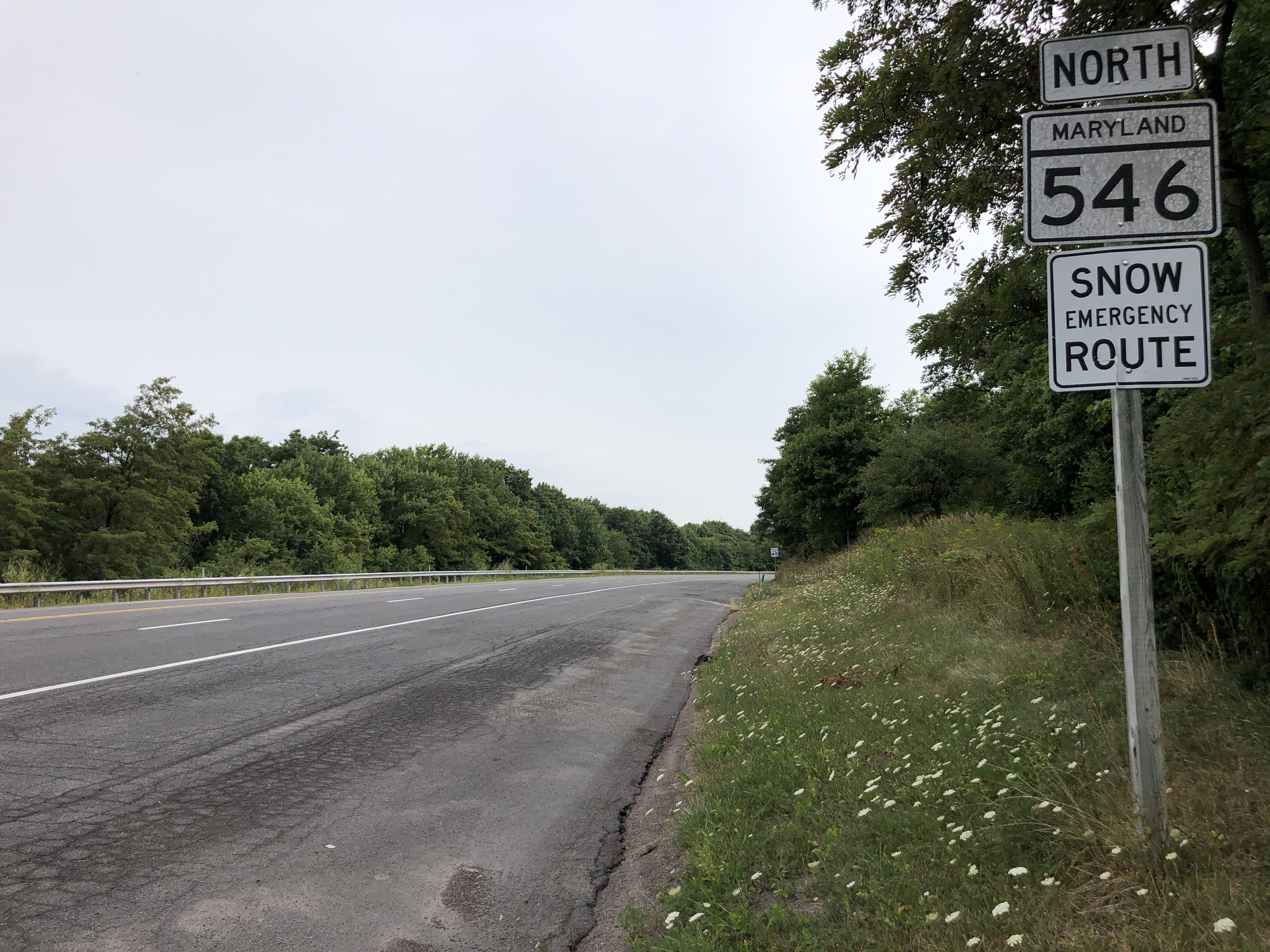
View north near the south end of MD 546 at I-68/US 40 in Finzel

MD 546 begins at an intersection of Beall School Road and Mels Road, heading northeast on two-lane undivided Finzel Road. The road continues south past the terminus as Beall School Road. A short distance to the northeast, the road intersects the ramps to and from eastbound I-68 and US 40 (National Freeway). MD 546 crosses I-68 then intersects the exit ramp from eastbound I-68 and unsigned MD 546F, a two-way access road to westbound I-68 and US 40 and US 40 Alternate (National Pike). The state highway passes over US 40 Alternate and continues northeast as a two-lane undivided road to an intersection with MD 946 (Finzel Road), the old alignment of MD 546. MD 546 continues north along the ridgeline of Little Savage Mountain through scattered residences and farmland to its northern terminus at the Pennsylvania state line. The highway continues north as SR 2010 (Greenville Road) through Greenville Township.

== History ==
MD 546 was constructed as a modern highway in 1933. The state highway originally followed what is now MD 946 to its southern terminus at a standard intersection with US 40 (now US 40 Alternate). MD 946's overpass of US 40 was constructed in 1956 when US 40 was relocated over Little Savage Mountain. MD 546 was relocated to its southern terminus at an interchange with I-68 when the highway's interchange was completed in 1974. In 2015, MD 546 was extended south from the I-68 interchange to the intersection of Beall School Road and Mels Road.

== Junction list ==
The entire route is in Finzel, Garrett County.

| mi | km | Destinations | Notes |
|---|---|---|---|
| 0.00 | 0.00 | Beall School Road south / Mels Road | Southern terminus |
| 0.22 | 0.35 | I-68 east / US 40 east (National Freeway) / Beall School Road south – Cumberland | I-68 Exit 29 |
| 0.37 | 0.60 | To I-68 west / US 40 west (National Freeway) / US 40 Alt. (National Pike) – Grantsville, Frostburg, Morgantown | Access road is unsigned MD 546F; I-68 Exit 29 |
| 0.81 | 1.30 | MD 946 south (Finzel Road) | Northern terminus of MD 946 |
| 3.61 | 5.81 | SR 2010 north (Greenville Road) – Greenville Township | Pennsylvania state line; northern terminus |
1.000 mi = 1.609 km; 1.000 km = 0.621 mi

== Auxiliary route ==
MD 546F is the designation for the unnamed 0.43-mile (0.69 km) access road between MD 546 and US 40 Alternate. The access road includes an entrance ramp to westbound I-68. MD 546F was constructed as part of MD 546's interchange with I-68 around 1974.
