= Finzel, Maryland =

- Census-designated place
- Location within Maryland Location within the United States
- Coordinates: 39°42′06″N 78°57′07″W
- Country: United States
- State: Maryland
- County: Garrett

Area
  - Total: 3.94 sq mi (10.20 km^{2})
  - Land: 3.94 sq mi (10.20 km^{2})
  - Water: 0 sq mi (0.00 km^{2})
- Elevation: 2,684 ft (818 m)

Population (2020)
  - Total: 495
  - Density: 125.7/sq mi (48.52/km^{2})
- Time zone: UTC-5 (Eastern (EST))
  - Summer (DST): UTC-4 (EDT)
- Area codes: 301, 240
- GNIS feature ID: 2583620

Finzel is a census-designated place (CDP) in Garrett County, Maryland, United States. Finzel is located on Maryland Route 546 near the Pennsylvania border. As of the 2010 census, its population was 547.

== Demographics ==
Historical population
Census	Pop.	Note	%±
2020	495		—
U.S. Decennial Census
