= U.S. Route 11 in Maryland =

Section of U.S. Highway in Washington County, Maryland, U.S.

U.S. Route 11
- US 11 highlighted in red

Route information
- Maintained by MDSHA, Town of Williamsport, and City of Hagerstown
- Length: 12.83 mi (20.65 km)
- Existed: 1926–present

Major junctions
- South end: US 11 at West Virginia border in Williamsport
- MD 63 / MD 68 in Williamsport; I-81 in Williamsport; US 40 in Hagerstown
- North end: US 11 at Pennsylvania border near Maugansville

Location
- Country: United States
- State: Maryland
- Counties: Washington

Highway system
- United States Numbered Highway System; List; Special; Divided; Maryland highway system; Interstate; US; State; Scenic Byways
| ← MD 10 | → MD 12 |

U.S. Route 11 (US 11) is a part of the United States Numbered Highway System that runs from New Orleans, Louisiana, to Rouses Point, New York. In Maryland, the federal highway runs 12.83 miles (20.65 km) from the West Virginia state line at the Potomac River in Williamsport north to the Pennsylvania state line near Maugansville. US 11 is the primary north–south surface highway in central Washington County, connecting Hagerstown with Williamsport to the south and Hagerstown Regional Airport to the north. The federal highway was once a major long-distance highway, but that role has been assumed by Interstate 81 (I-81), which parallels US 11 not only in Maryland but for most of its course from Tennessee to Upstate New York. US 11 is maintained by the Maryland State Highway Administration except for the municipally-maintained portions within the corporate limits of Williamsport and Hagerstown.

US 11 is the descendant of a trail blazed through the Great Appalachian Valley in the 18th century. In the 19th century, this trail was upgraded to a pair of turnpikes, one from Williamsport to Hagerstown and the second from Hagerstown to the Pennsylvania state line. The highway was constructed in its modern form in the early 20th century, with the bridge across the Potomac River constructed in 1909 and the old turnpikes paved as all-weather roads by the nascent Maryland State Roads Commission in the 1910s. These highways and the streets of Hagerstown and Williamsport were designated Maryland's portion of US 11 in 1926. The federal highway was improved outside of the towns in the years surrounding 1930 and again around 1950. Since the completion of I-81 in two sections in the late 1950s and mid-1960s removed long-distance traffic from the highway, US 11 has seen its two major relocations: one that removed the highway from downtown Hagerstown and another required by expansion at Hagerstown Regional Airport.

== Route description ==
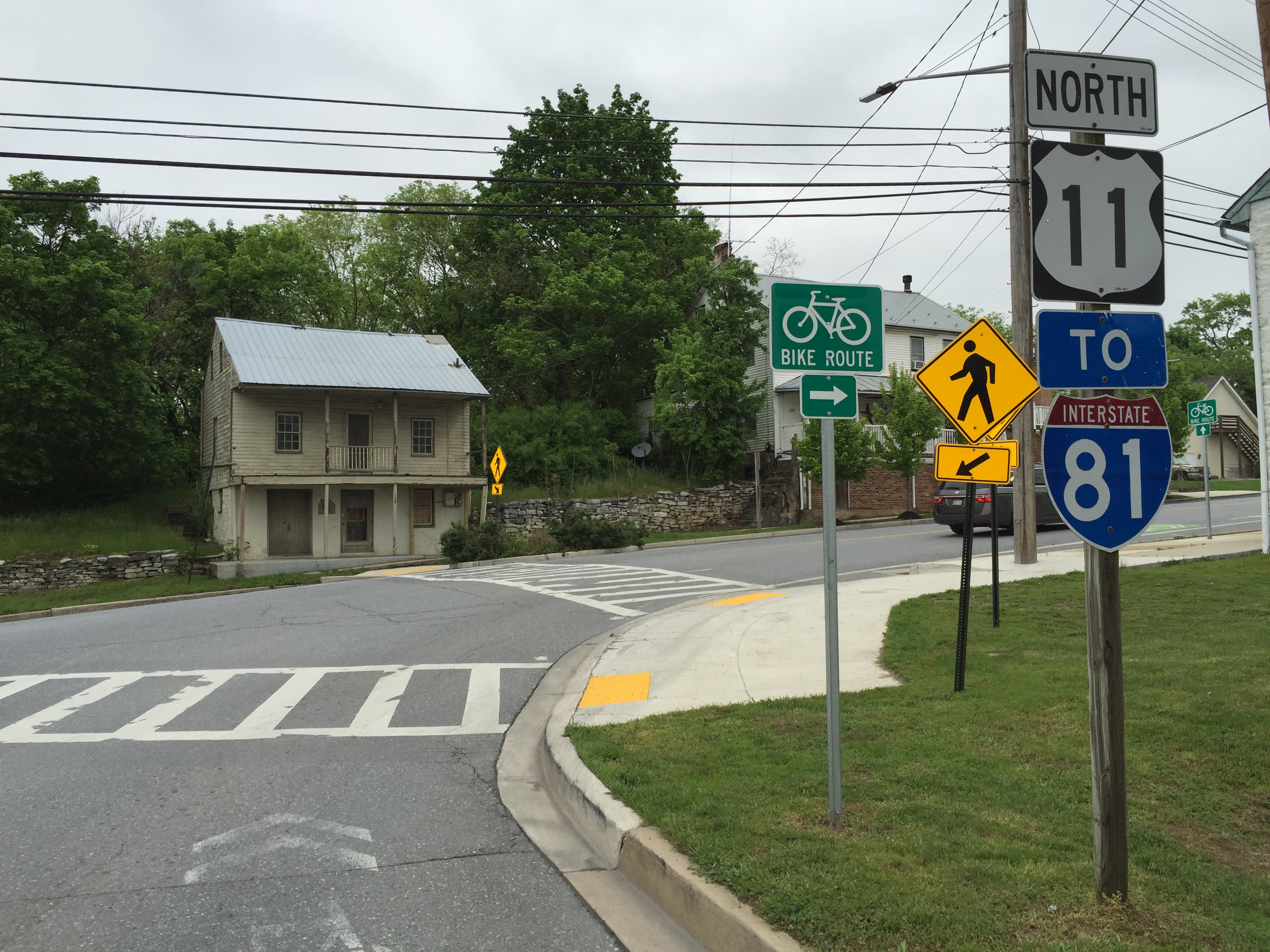
US 11 northbound entering Williamsport

US 11 begins at the West Virginia state line on the south bank of the Potomac River. The highway crosses the Potomac River on a two-lane bridge just south of its confluence with Conococheague Creek. The bridge passes over Potomac Park and the Chesapeake and Ohio Canal National Historical Park. At the east end of the bridge, US 11 enters the town of Williamsport, where the highway is a municipally-maintained two-lane undivided road. The federal highway makes a turn to the north, then makes a sharp turn to the east onto Potomac Street adjacent to the Williamsport Visitor Center of the historical park. Within the Williamsport Historic District, US 11 intersects MD 68 (Conococheague Street) and MD 63. MD 63 joins MD 68 in a concurrency on Conococheague Street to the south and US 11 on Potomac Street east to Artizan Street, where MD 63 heads north out of town. US 11 veers northeast and heads through a more suburban area of Williamsport. The federal highway leaves the town of Williamsport and becomes state-maintained immediately before expanding to a four-lane divided highway for its partial cloverleaf interchange with I-81 (Maryland Veterans Memorial Highway).

US 11 continues northeast as Virginia Avenue, a two-lane highway through residential subdivisions. The federal highway passes close to historic home Tammany and intersects Governor Lane Boulevard, which heads south through an industrial park. US 11 passes under I-70 with no access and enters the suburb of Halfway, where the highway crosses the Winchester and Western Railroad at-grade and at an angle. The federal highway intersects both Massey and Halfway boulevards, which head northwest toward Valley Mall. US 11 continues into the city of Hagerstown, where the highway becomes municipally-maintained and enters an industrial area. The federal highway crosses Norfolk Southern Railway's Hagerstown District rail line immediately before its intersection with Wilson Boulevard, which heads east. Virginia Avenue, the old alignment of US 11, continues north toward downtown Hagerstown, passing through the South Prospect Street Historic District and passing by Hagerstown City Park, which contains the Hager House and Washington County Museum of Fine Arts.

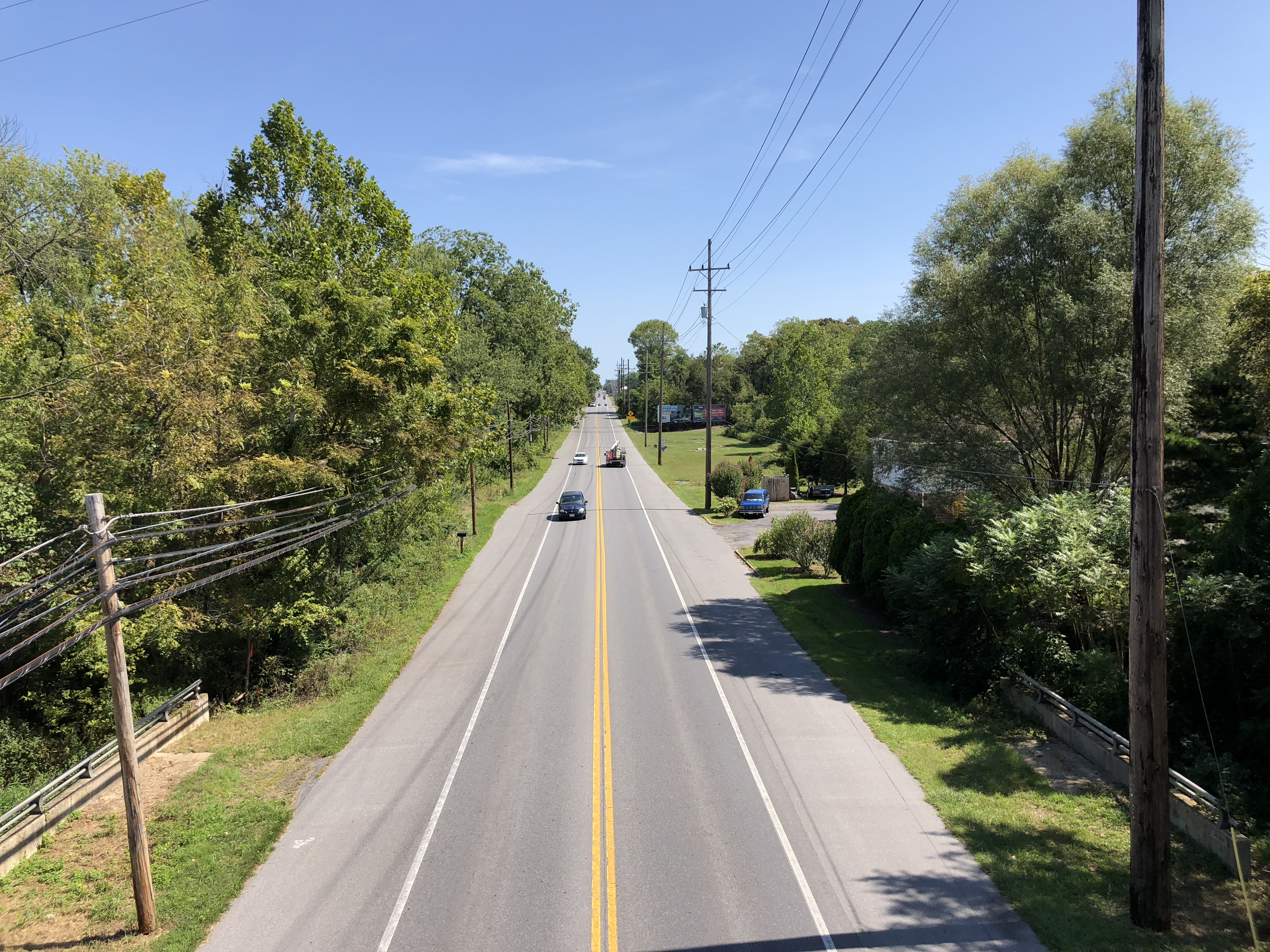
US 11 northbound in Halfway

US 11 turns west onto Burhans Boulevard and immediately crosses over the Norfolk Southern Railway line again. The federal highway curves to the north, paralleling the rail line, then crosses over the Winchester and Western Railroad line as its junction with the Norfork Southern Railway line. US 11 continues north through a residential neighborhood before passing by the Hagerstown Roundhouse Museum and passing under CSX Transportation's Lurgan Subdivision rail line just east of its wye with the Norfolk Southern Railway line. At the intersection with Elgin Boulevard and Lanvale Street, US 11 turns east to remain on Burhans Boulevard and starts to parallel the CSX Transportation rail line. The federal highway and railroad curve to the north, where the highway intersects US 40 on the opposite side of the tracks from downtown Hagerstown. US 40 consists of a one-way pair: Washington Street eastbound and Franklin Street westbound. Between the two directions of US 40, US 11 passes historic Hagerstown station, which is now the headquarters of the Hagerstown Police Department. North of US 40, US 11 intersects Salem Avenue, crosses Norfolk Southern Railway's Lurgan Branch rail line, and curves north away from CSX Transportation's Hanover Subdivision rail line, which turns to the east. Burhans Boulevard reaches its northern end at an oblique three-way intersection with Pennsylvania Avenue.

US 11 continues north on Pennsylvania Avenue, passing west of North Hagerstown High School. State maintenance of the federal highway resumes, and the highway's name changes to Middleburg Pike at Haven Road just before the highway leaves the city of Hagerstown. US 11 continues north past residential subdivisions in the suburb of Fountainhead-Orchard Hills. The federal highway passes a Volvo manufacturing plant and intersects Maugans Avenue, which heads west to Maugansville. North of the intersection with Showalter Road, US 11 adjoins the property of Hagerstown Regional Airport. The federal highway curves to the northeast and passes through a tunnel under the airport's east–west runway. The federal highway curves back to the northwest through an industrial area before resuming its northward course to the Pennsylvania state line. US 11 enters Pennsylvania just south of the federal highway's intersection with Pennsylvania Route 163 (Mason Dixon Road).

== History ==
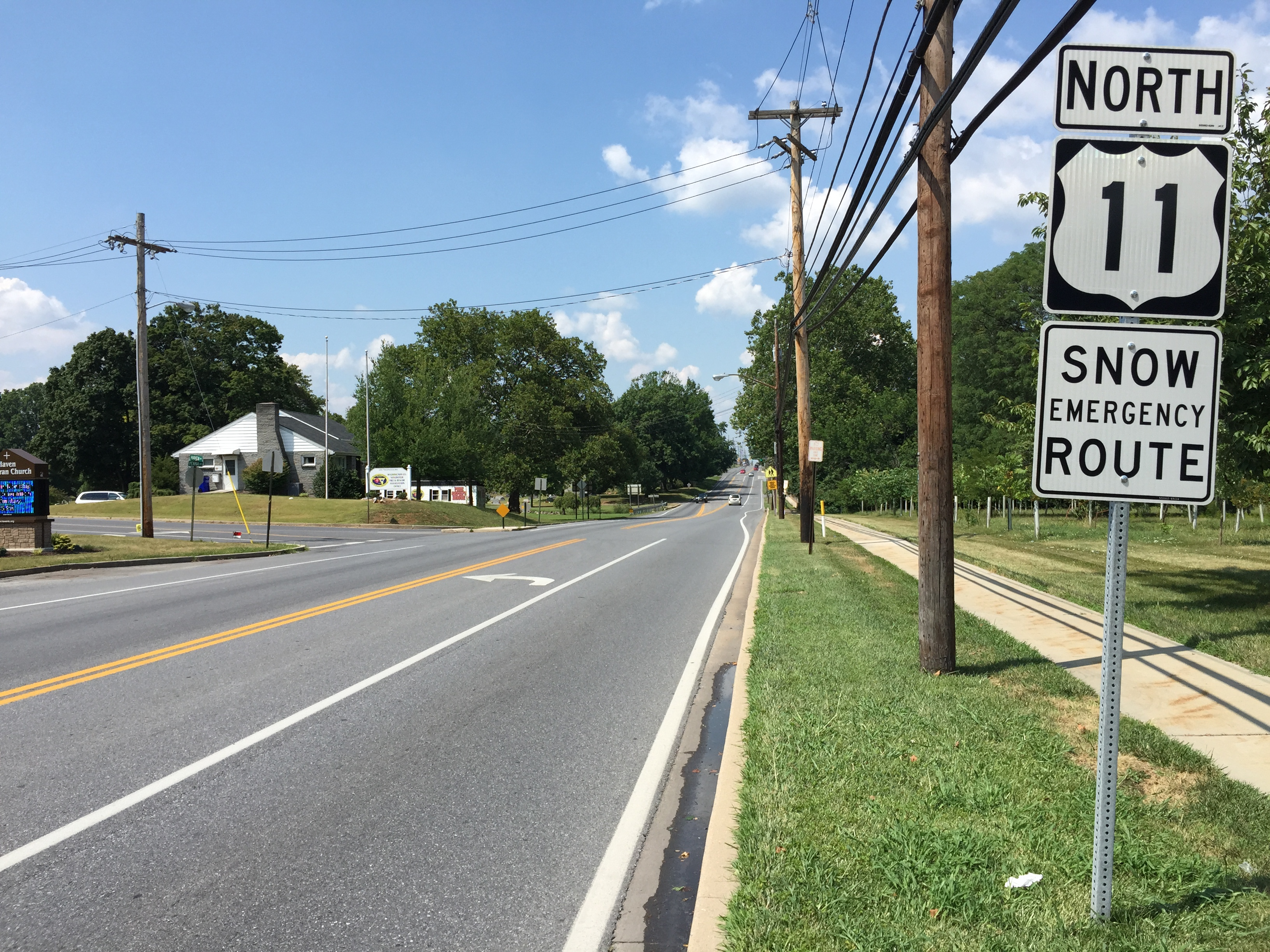
US 11 northbound in Hagerstown

US 11 is the descendant of a trail blazed from Pennsylvania following the establishment of Evan Watkins's ferry across the Potomac River at the mouth of Conococheague Creek in 1744. This trail became part of the Great Wagon Road from Philadelphia south through the Great Appalachian Valley to Virginia and North Carolina. In the center of the Hagerstown Valley along the trail, German immigrant Jonathan Hager laid out his namesake town in 1762. In the 19th century, the Hagerstown and Middleburg Turnpike was constructed between Hagerstown and Middleburg, a settlement on the Pennsylvania side of the state line. In addition. the Williamsport and Hagerstown Turnpike was constructed between the town that sprung up at the Potomac River crossing and the county seat of Washington County. Starting in 1896, the Hagerstown Railway Company of Washington County operated an interurban between Williamsport and Hagerstown adjacent to the turnpike. The streetcar suburb of Halfway developed along the turnpike and trolley line at the midpoint between the two municipalities.

The first portion of modern US 11 to be constructed was the bridge over the Potomac River at Williamsport, which was financed and constructed by Washington County and completed in 1909. The new bridge, which became the only crossing between Cumberland and Washington, D.C. to survive the flood of March 1936, charged tolls from a tollgate at the West Virginia end of the bridge. The Maryland State Roads Commission later purchased the bridge in 1954 and removed the tolls in 1958. Both the Williamsport Pike and Middleburg Pike, their right-of-way now owned by the Maryland State Roads Commission, were paved by 1921. Those highways as well as Potomac Street in the town of Williamsport and the streets connecting the two former turnpikes within the city of Hagerstown—Virginia Avenue, Jonathan Street, and Pennsylvania Avenue—were designated Maryland's portion of US 11 in 1926.

The first upgrades to US 11 occurred when Williamsport Pike and Middleburg Pike were rebuilt and widened in the late 1920s and early 1930s, respectively. Williamsport Pike was rebuilt again in 1948, with the highway widened using the right-of-way of the Williamsport–Hagerstown interurban that had ceased service in 1947. By 1950, US 11 in Hagerstown followed a one-way pair: the northbound direction followed Summit Avenue and Jonathan Street between Virginia Avenue and Pennsylvania Avenue and the southbound direction used Prospect Street through the downtown area. The first relief from long-distance traffic came to US 11 when the first section of I-81 was completed from US 40 to the Pennsylvania state line in 1958. Following the completion of I-81 from US 40 south to the Potomac River in 1966, US 11 became a highway mainly for local traffic. US 11's bridge across the Potomac River was rebuilt in 1979. In addition, the highway's name south of Hagerstown was changed from Williamsport Pike to Virginia Avenue around 1995.

Despite the construction of I-81, another bypass of downtown Hagerstown, Burhans Boulevard, was constructed in the 1960s. Burhans Boulevard was named for Winslow F. Burhans, the mayor of Hagerstown from 1953 to 1965 who was instrumental in elevating the tracks of the Western Maryland Railway on the west side of downtown Hagerstown to eliminate a series of grade crossings. The boulevard was started in 1960 between Salem and Pennsylvania avenues. Construction was underway on the section between Virginia Avenue and Elgin Boulevard by 1962. Both sections were completed by 1965. Burhans Boulevard was completed around 1968 from Elgin Boulevard to Washington Street, from which the boulevard continued north paralleling the Western Maryland Railway tracks along what had formerly been Foundry Street. At the southern end of Hagerstown, Burhans Boulevard, Virginia Avenue, and Wilson Boulevard were relocated to eliminate two grade crossings with the Norfolk Southern Railway tracks in 1983. Burhans Boulevard remained a regular municipal street until US 11 was rerouted away from downtown Hagerstown around 1987.

The other major relocation of US 11 occurred around Hagerstown Regional Airport. Due to the airport's east–west runway being extended eastward, US 11 was relocated by Washington County in 1964, resulting in a wide curve in what had been a straight highway. The portion of highway between Showalter Road and the Pennsylvania state line was subsequently county-maintained until 1972. Another extension of the east–west runway occurred between 2004 and 2007. For this extension, US 11 was relocated to a tunnel underneath the extended runway along the curved alignment in 2006.

== Junction list ==
The entire route is in Washington County.

| Location | mi | km | Destinations | Notes |
|---|---|---|---|---|
| Williamsport | 0.00 | 0.00 | US 11 south (Williamsport Pike) – Martinsburg | West Virginia state line at Potomac River; southern terminus of US 11 in Maryland |
| Williamsport | 0.62 | 1.00 | MD 63 south / MD 68 (Conococheague Street) – Boonsboro, Clear Spring, Downsville | South end of concurrency with MD 63 |
| Williamsport | 0.75 | 1.21 | MD 63 north (Artizan Street) / Artizan Street south – Huyett | North end of concurrency with MD 63 |
| Williamsport | 1.67 | 2.69 | I-81 (Maryland Veterans Memorial Highway) – Roanoke, Harrisburg | I-81 Exit 2 |
| Hagerstown | 7.27 | 11.70 | US 40 east (Washington Street) – Frederick | |
| Hagerstown | 7.37 | 11.86 | US 40 west (Franklin Street) – Hancock | |
| Maugansville | 12.83 | 20.65 | US 11 north (Pennsylvania Avenue) – Chambersburg | Pennsylvania state line; northern terminus of US 11 in Maryland |
1.000 mi = 1.609 km; 1.000 km = 0.621 mi: Concurrency terminus

== See also ==
U.S. Route 11
| Previous state: West Virginia | Maryland | Next state: Pennsylvania |
