= Interstate 81 in Maryland =

Section of Interstate Highway in Washington County, Maryland, United States

Interstate 81
- Maryland Veterans Memorial Highway
- I-81 highlighted in red

Route information
- Maintained by MDSHA
- Length: 12.08 mi (19.44 km)
- Existed: August 14, 1957–present
- NHS: Entire route

Major junctions
- South end: I-81 at the West Virginia state line
- MD 63 / MD 68 in Williamsport; US 11 in Williamsport; I-70 in Halfway; US 40 in Hagerstown; MD 58 in Hagerstown
- North end: I-81 at the Pennsylvania state line

Location
- Country: United States
- State: Maryland
- Counties: Washington

Highway system
- Interstate Highway System; Main; Auxiliary; Suffixed; Business; Future; Maryland highway system; Interstate; US; State; Scenic Byways
← MD 80	→ I-83

Interstate 81 (I-81) is a part of the Interstate Highway System that runs from Dandridge, Tennessee, to Fishers Landing, New York. In Maryland, the Interstate Highway runs 12.08 miles (19.44 km) from the West Virginia state line at the Potomac River in Williamsport north to the Pennsylvania state line near Maugansville. I-81 is the primary north–south Interstate Highway in Washington County, connecting Hagerstown with Chambersburg and Harrisburg to the north and Martinsburg, Winchester, and Roanoke to the south.

The idea of a north–south bypass of Hagerstown to relieve congestion on the contemporary main highway through the Hagerstown Valley, U.S. Route 11 (US 11), predates the Interstate Highway System. Construction on the Hagerstown Bypass began in the mid-1950s and was completed in 1958 from US 40 north to the Pennsylvania state line. I-81 was assigned to the new freeway in 1959. The southern section of the freeway from the Potomac River to US 40 was built starting in 1962 and completed in 1966. Beyond interchange improvements, I-81 has changed very little from the four-lane freeway of the 1960s. Long-range plans call for widening I-81 to six lanes and effecting further interchange improvements along what is a major commuting and trucking corridor.

== Route description ==
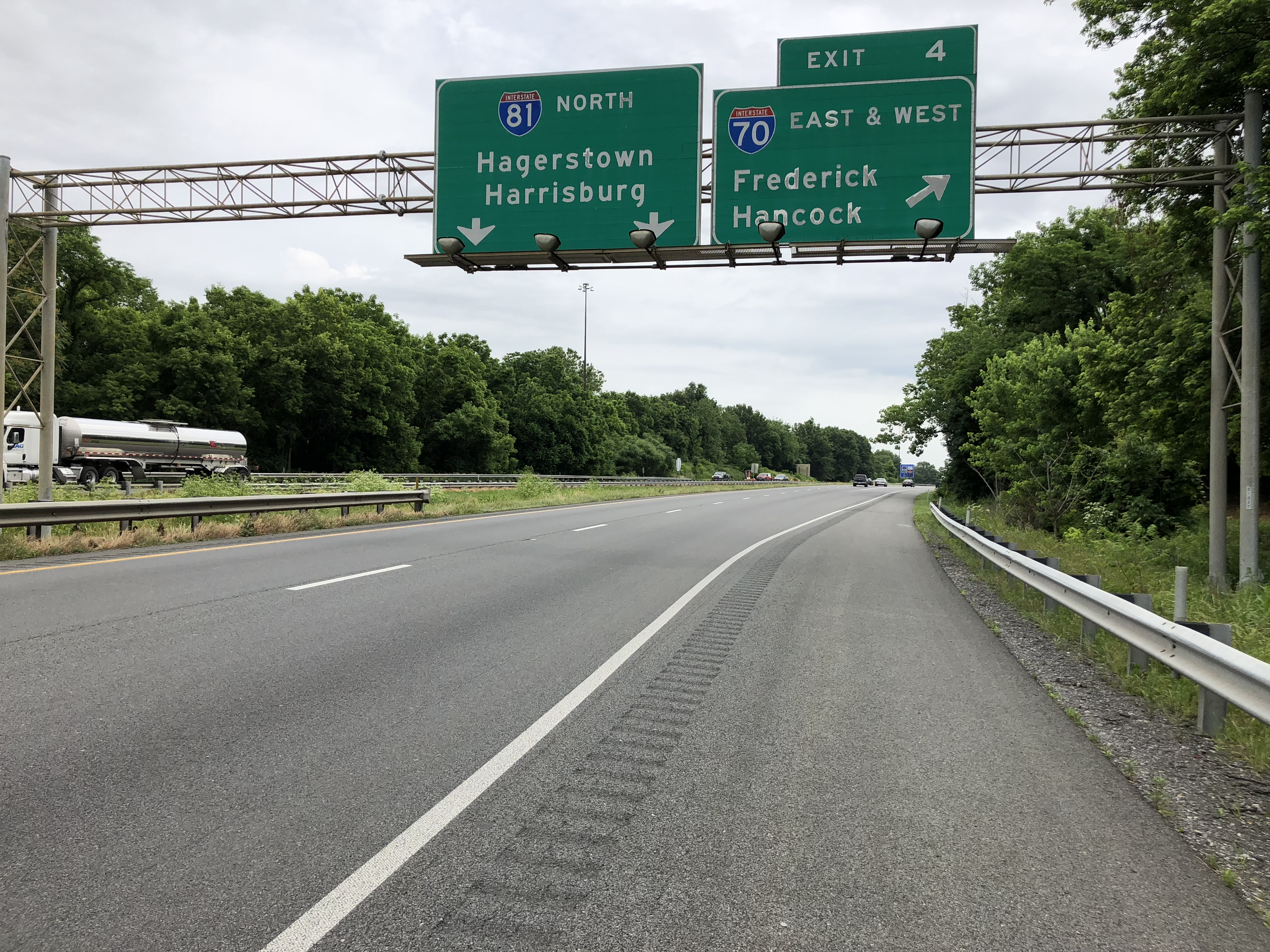
I-81 northbound at I-70 interchange in Halfway

I-81 crosses the Potomac River from West Virginia and enters Maryland as a six-lane freeway. The Interstate curves to the northeast around Williamsport, where the highway meets Maryland Route 68 (MD 68) and MD 63 (Lappans Road) at a diamond interchange (exit 1) to the south of the town and US 11 (Virginia Avenue) at a five-ramp partial cloverleaf interchange (exit 2) to the east. The Interstate is reduced to four lanes after Exit 1. The Interstate passes along the edge of the Hagerstown suburb of Halfway, where the highway meets I-70 (Eisenhower Memorial Highway) at a cloverleaf interchange (exit 4) with collector–distributor lanes on both I-81 and I-70. Traffic for I-68 is advised to use I-70 West. I-81 meets Halfway Boulevard, which leads to several shopping centers including Valley Mall, at a six-ramp partial cloverleaf interchange (exit 5).

I-81 continues northeast along the west edge of Hagerstown. The Interstate crosses CSX Transportation's Lurgan Subdivision railroad line and passes under MD 144 (Washington Street) with no access before reaching a cloverleaf interchange with US 40 (National Pike; exit 6). The freeway intersects MD 58 (Cearfoss Pike) at a partial cloverleaf interchange (exit 7). Immediately to the north, I-81 has a partial interchange with Maugansville Road (exit 8) featuring a loop exit ramp from southbound I-81 and a straight entrance ramp to the northbound direction. The Interstate curves to the north and crosses Norfolk Southern Railway's Lurgan Branch. The Interstate passes along the eastern edge of Maugansville, where the highway meets Maugans Avenue at a diamond interchange (exit 9). I-81 meets Showalter Road, which is used to access Hagerstown Regional Airport, at a cloverleaf interchange (exit 10) as the freeway gently curves around the airport's runway. The Interstate heads northeast to the Pennsylvania state line, on top of which the highway meets Pennsylvania Route 163 (PA 163; Mason Dixon Road) at exit 1 of the Pennsylvania exit sequence. The southbound exit ramp to and entrance ramp from PA 163 are in Maryland and the northbound ramps are in Pennsylvania.

I-81, like all Interstate Highways, is a part of the National Highway System for its entire length. It is the shortest mainline Interstate in Maryland and contains the shortest portion of I-81 of all six states through which the Interstate Highway passes. The Interstate was dedicated as the Maryland Veterans Memorial Highway in 1987.

== History ==
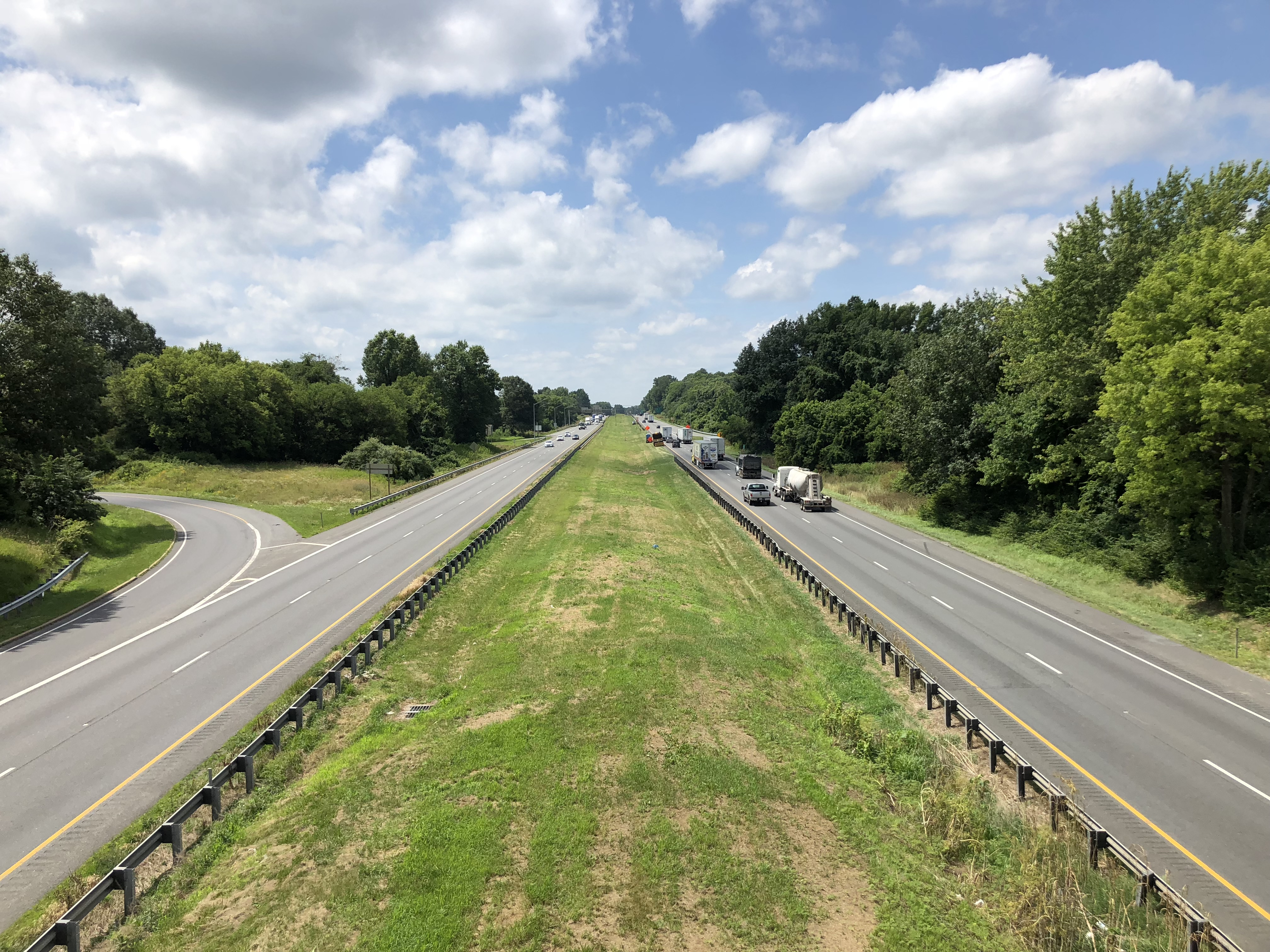
I-81 southbound at US 11 interchange in Williamsport

I-81 crossing the Potomac River near the Maryland–West Virginia border. The video was taken during the widening of the freeway to three lanes in mid-2019.

The first section of I-81 to be constructed in Maryland was the pre-Interstate Hagerstown Bypass that was planned to provide relief to the existing north–south highway through downtown Hagerstown, US 11. The highway was planned to run from US 40 west of downtown Hagerstown to the Pennsylvania state line, where the Pennsylvania Department of Highways would continue the bypass north to tie into US 11 near Greencastle. Preliminary engineering on the Hagerstown Bypass began in 1954 and construction began in 1956, by which time a southern extension was planned south to US 11 east of Williamsport. The freeway was completed from US 40 (now MD 144) to the Pennsylvania state line in 1958, including an interchange with the present alignment of US 40 west of downtown Hagerstown, a highway that was completed around 1963. Traffic from the Hagerstown Bypass followed Mason Dixon Road to US 11 until the bypass was extended into Pennsylvania and tied into US 11 around modern exit 3 in 1960. The new freeway was marked as I-81 beginning in 1959.

Construction on the portion of I-81 south of US 40 began in 1962 to fill a gap between the portion of I-81 in Maryland and the portion of the Interstate completed between West Virginia Route 9 (WV 9) near Martinsburg and US 11 southwest of Williamsport in West Virginia. MD 144's bridge over I-81 was constructed in 1963 once the relocated US 40 opened. The cloverleaf interchange between I-81 and the future I-70 was constructed in 1964, including the collector–distributor lanes. The remainder of the highway south to the Potomac River, including the bridge over the Potomac River, was under construction by 1965. On June 30, 1966, the 4.97-mile (8.00 km) section between US 11 in West Virginia and US 11 in Williamsport, was jointly opened to traffic and dedicated by former Governor William Preston Lane Jr., State Senator George Snyder, and West Virginia U.S. Senator Jennings Randolph in a ceremony on the Potomac River bridges. The section between US 11 and US 40 opened on October 19, 1966, in a ribbon-cutting ceremony officiated by former Governor Lane.

I-81 remains very similar to when it was completed in 1966. Exit numbers were first marked in 1974; these exit numbers have not changed. The Maugansville Road interchange was originally a full interchange, but it was reduced to a partial interchange in 1968. The interchange with MD 68 and MD 63 south of Williamsport originally only had a northbound exit ramp and a southbound entrance ramp; ramps to and from the direction of Hagerstown were added between 1981 and 1989. The junction with Halfway Boulevard was a diamond interchange until it was rebuilt as a partial cloverleaf interchange in 2001.

== Future ==
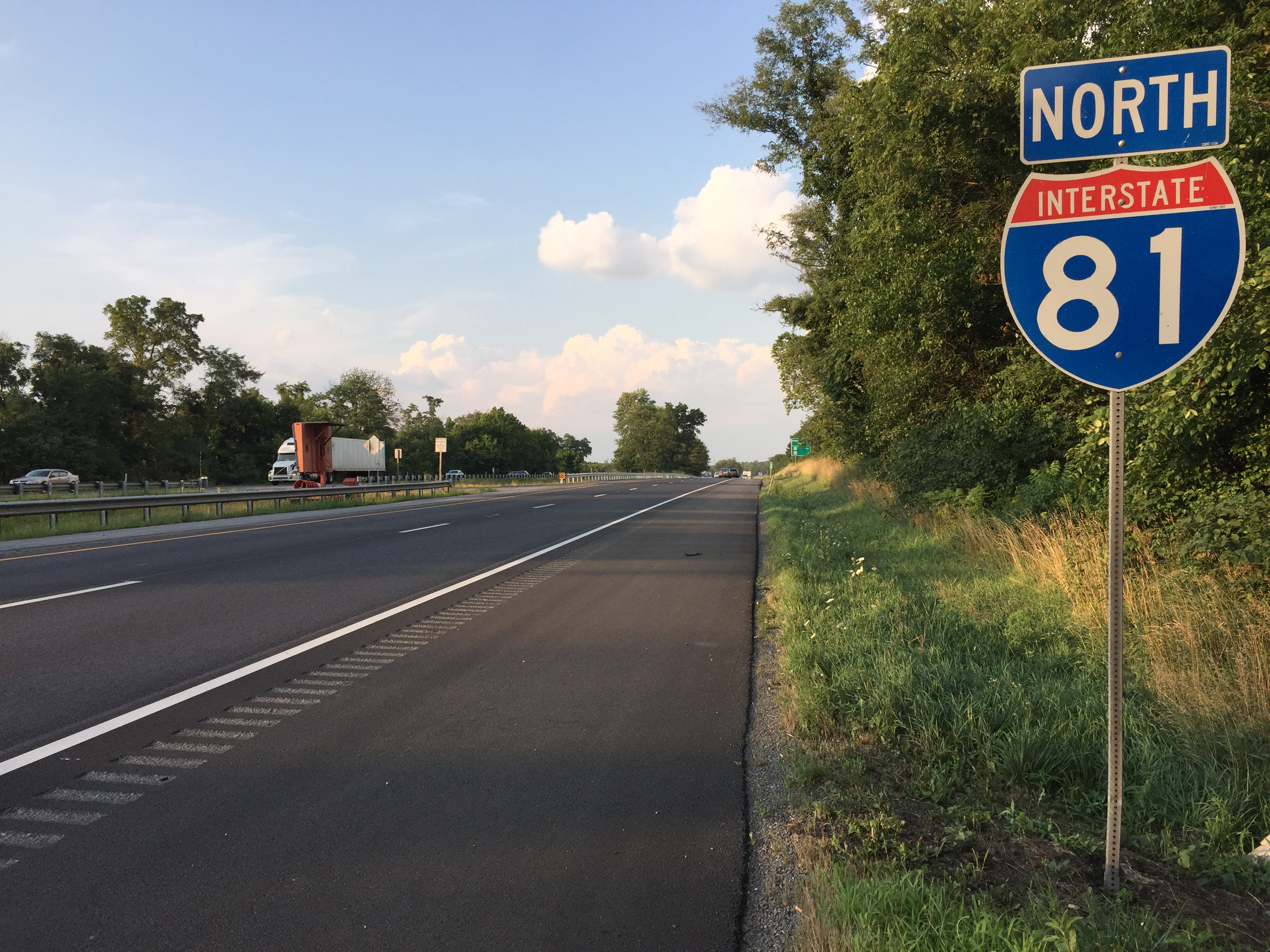
View north along I-81 just north of exit 5 at Halfway Boulevard in Halfway

I-81 is heavily congested within Maryland due to the 1960s-era freeway being used as both a commuter route within the rapidly growing Hagerstown metropolitan area as well as a major trucking corridor. In 2010, the highway had a minimum annual average daily traffic (AADT) of 43,771 between Showalter Road and PA 163 and a maximum of 62,181 between Halfway Boulevard and US 40. The Interstate is often used by long-distance traffic as an alternative to I-95 to avoid traveling through the major cities of the East Coast. As a result, in 2001, the Maryland State Highway Administration (MDSHA) began developing long-term plans to upgrade the entire length of I-81 in Maryland. The state completed the planning process for the eventual upgrades to the Interstate Highway in November 2010. Phase 1 of the expansion started in the October 2016, and was completed on February 11, 2021. This included rebuilding the dual bridges over the Potomac River to include 3 travel lanes in each direction to meet with the already widened section of the Interstate in West Virginia. The Interstate currently returns to four lanes after Exit 1. The state plans to expand I-81 to six lanes to address capacity concerns. In addition, many of the interchanges will be rebuilt to reduce or eliminate weaving. In particular:

- The collector–distributor lanes within the I-70 interchange would be extended north through the Halfway Boulevard interchange.
- The US 40 and Showalter Road interchanges would be changed from a full cloverleaf interchange to a partial interchange by removing the two loop ramps from the crossroad onto I-81.
- The MD 58 interchanges may be converted from a partial cloverleaf interchange to a diamond interchange.
- The Maugans Avenue diamond interchange may have a loop ramp added from westbound Maugans Avenue to southbound I-81.

At almost every interchange, acceleration and deceleration lanes would be lengthened to modern standards. The ramps within the I-70 interchange would be modified to better handle traffic passing between two freeways. Auxiliary lanes would be added in both directions between the US 40 and MD 58 interchanges and southbound between the Showalter Road and Maugans Avenue interchanges. In addition, there is an option to construct a truck weigh station somewhere along I-81 within the state; there are no weigh stations along either the Maryland or West Virginia segments of I-81.

Phase 2 of the project is currently funded with an anticipated construction start in 2025, later being delayed to 2027 with an expected cost increase of approximately $67 million. Phase 2 includes widening the Interstate to six lanes from Exit 1 to after Exit 5, along with intersection improvements and bridge replacements.

== Exit list ==
The entire route is in Washington County.

Location	mi	km	Exit	Destinations	Notes
Potomac River	0.00	0.00	—	I-81 south – Roanoke	Continuation into West Virginia
Williamsport	0.88	1.42	1	MD 63 / MD 68 – Williamsport, Boonsboro	
Williamsport	2.37	3.81	2	US 11 – Williamsport	
Halfway	3.63	5.84	4	I-70 to I-68 west – Frederick, Hancock	Signed as exits 4A (east) and 4B (west) southbound; I-68 not signed southbound; exits 26A-B on I-70
Halfway	4.63	7.45	5	Halfway Boulevard	Signed as exits 5A (east) and 5B (west)
Hagerstown	6.85	11.02	6	US 40 – Hagerstown, Huyett	National Pike; signed as exits 6A (east) and 6B (west)
Hagerstown	7.70	12.39	7	MD 58 (Salem Avenue) – Hagerstown, Cearfoss	Signed as exits 7A (east) and 7B (west)
Hagerstown	8.08	13.00	8	Maugansville Road	Southbound exit and northbound entrance
Maugansville	9.59	15.43	9	Maugans Avenue	
Maugansville	10.42	16.77	10	Showalter Road – Hagerstown Regional Airport	Signed as exits 10A (east) and 10B (west)
Maugansville	12.08	19.44	1	PA 163 (Mason Dixon Road)	Exit number follows Pennsylvania mileage; southbound ramps in Maryland, northbound ramps in Pennsylvania
Maugansville	12.08	19.44	—	I-81 north – Harrisburg	Continuation into Pennsylvania
1.000 mi = 1.609 km; 1.000 km = 0.621 mi: Incomplete access

== See also ==
Interstate 81
Previous state: West Virginia	Maryland	Next state: Pennsylvania
