= Maryland Route 63 =

State highway in Washington County, Maryland, US

Maryland Route 63
- Maryland Route 63 highlighted in red

Route information
- Maintained by MDSHA and Town of Williamsport
- Length: 16.99 mi (27.34 km)
- Existed: 1927–present
- Tourist routes: Chesapeake and Ohio Canal Scenic Byway

Major junctions
- South end: MD 65 in Fairplay
- MD 68 in Williamsport; I-81 in Williamsport; US 11 in Williamsport; I-70 near Huyett; US 40 in Huyett; MD 494 in Cearfoss; MD 58 in Cearfoss
- North end: PA 163 near Cearfoss

Location
- Country: United States
- State: Maryland
- Counties: Washington

Highway system
- Maryland highway system; Interstate; US; State; Scenic Byways
← MD 62	→ MD 64

Maryland Route 63 (MD 63) is a state highway in the U.S. state of Maryland. The state highway runs 16.99 miles (27.34 km) from MD 65 in Fairplay north to the Pennsylvania state line near Cearfoss, where the highway continues as Pennsylvania Route 163 (PA 163). MD 63 is an L-shaped route that passes through central Washington County on the south and west sides of Hagerstown. The state highway connects with multiple local and long-distance highways that serve Hagerstown, including Interstate 81 (I-81) and U.S. Route 11 (US 11) in Williamsport and I-70 and US 40 in Huyett. MD 63 also joins MD 68 in a concurrency through Williamsport.

The Spielman Road portion of MD 63 was constructed in two segments from Spielman to Downsville and from there to Williamsport in the mid 1910s and early 1930s, respectively. The Greencastle Pike portion of MD 63, which follows a former turnpike, was constructed as MD 398 from Williamsport to Cearfoss in the early 1930s. MD 63 was extended to its present termini, assuming MD 398, and was rebuilt from Williamsport to Huyett in the late 1950s. The state highway was reconstructed along with MD 68 south of Williamsport concurrent with I-81 in the mid-1960s.

== Route description ==
MD 63 begins at an intersection with MD 65 (Sharpsburg Pike) in the hamlet of Fairplay. The state highway heads west as Spielman Road, a narrow and curvaceous two-lane undivided highway through farmland and scattered residences. MD 63 crosses a one-lane bridge over Marsh Run just prior to Reichard Road; makes a sharp turn to the south adjacent to Marsh Mills; makes another sharp turn to the west; crosses a one-lane bridge over St. James Run; and crosses Norfolk Southern Railway's Hagerstown District line at-grade in the hamlet of Spielman. The state highway widens as it starts to curve to the northwest through farmland, crossing Downey Branch and intersecting MD 632 (Downsville Pike) in the village of Downsville. MD 63 passes the historic home Rose Hill, crosses a Winchester and Western Railroad line at-grade, then makes a turn to the east and intersects MD 68 (Lappans Road). Governor Lane Boulevard continues east through an industrial park while MD 63 turns north to join MD 68 in a concurrency north into Williamsport.

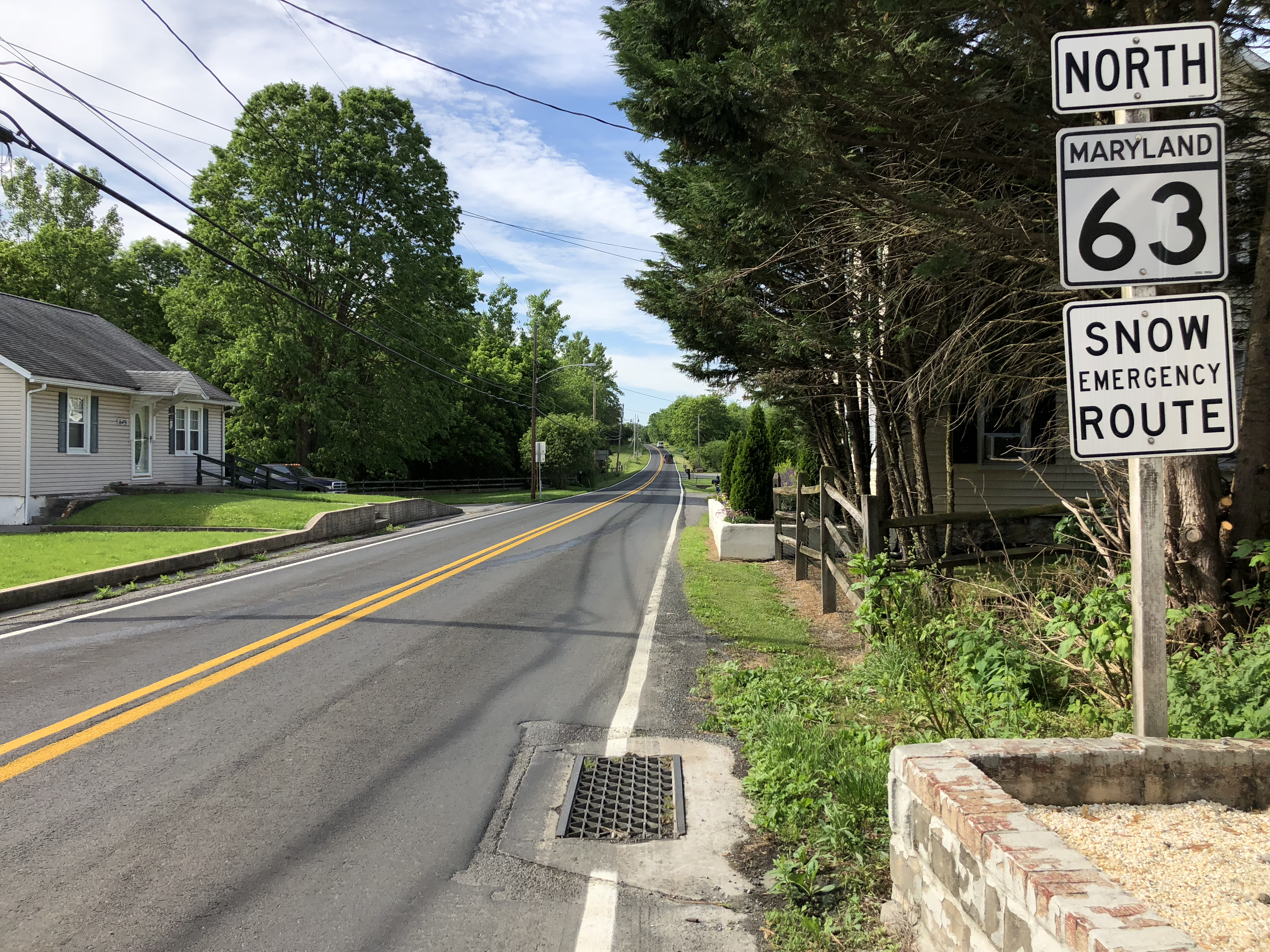
View north along MD 63 at MD 632 in Downsville

MD 63 and MD 68 expand to a four-lane divided highway through their diamond interchange with I-81 (Maryland Veterans Memorial Highway). A park and ride lot is located within the northwest quadrant of this interchange. At the northern end of the interchange, the state highways enter the town of Williamsport, where the highways follow municipally-maintained Conococheague Street through the Williamsport Historic District. In the center of town, the two highways meet US 11 (Potomac Street). MD 68 continues north while MD 63 turns east onto Potomac Street to join US 11 in a short concurrency. MD 63 leaves US 11 by turning north onto Artizan Street. At the north town limit of Williamsport, state maintenance resumes and MD 63's name changes to Greencastle Pike. The old alignment of MD 63, Honeyfield Road, parallels the state highway on the west as the highway enters a mix of farmland, forest, and industrial properties and crosses over Semple Run and CSX's Lurgan Subdivision railroad line. MD 63 crosses a tributary of Conococheague Creek and expands to a four-lane divided highway through its diamond interchange with I-70 (Eisenhower Memorial Highway).

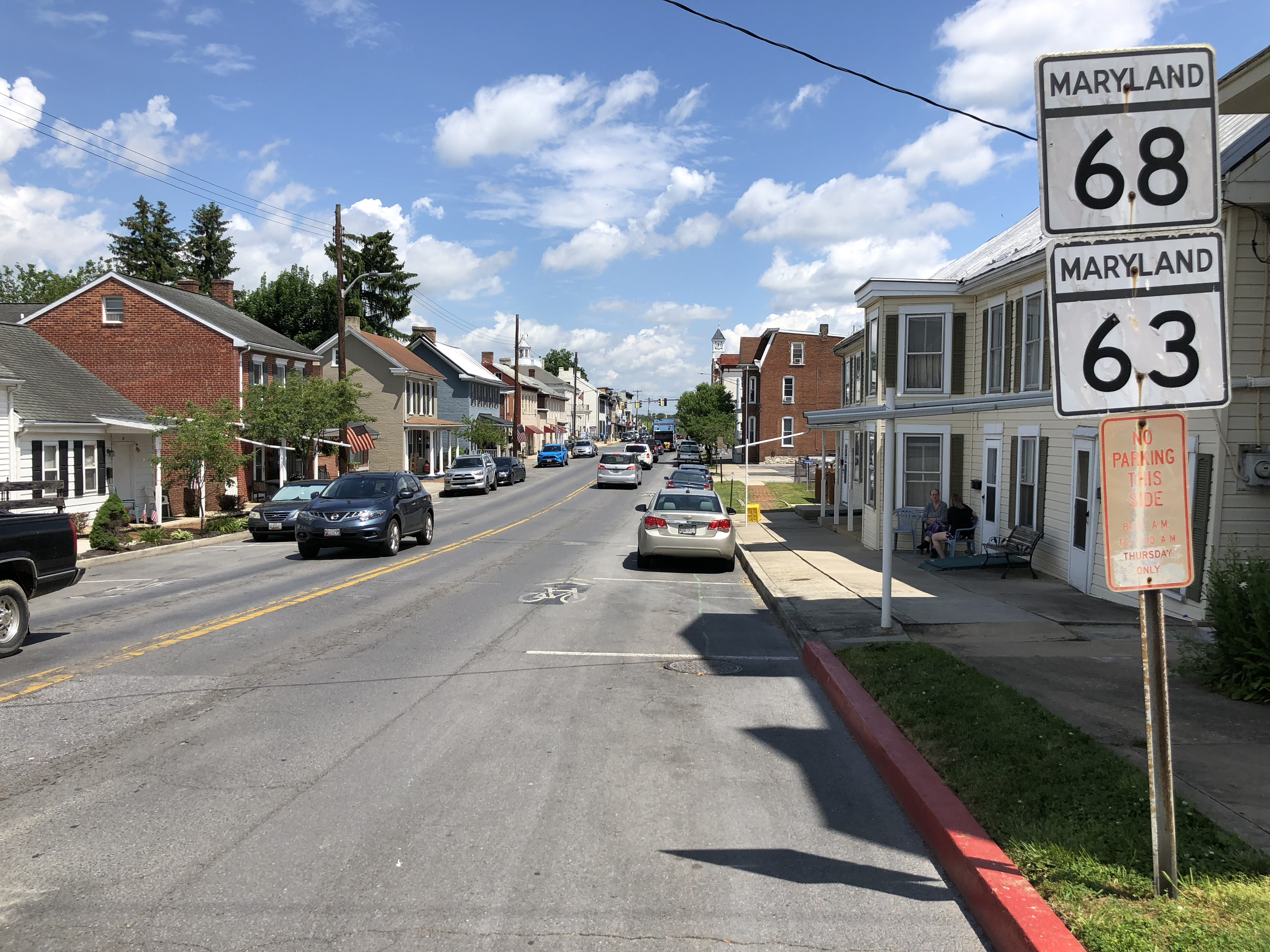
MD 63 northbound/MD 68 westbound in Williamsport

MD 63 continues north as a two-lane undivided highway past several industrial parks and farms before intersecting US 40 (National Pike) in the village of Huyett, where the highway is paralleled by the old alignment, Huyett Lane, to the east. The state highway starts to curve to the northeast through farmland, crossing Rush Run and intersecting Broadfording Road before approaching the village of Cearfoss. MD 63 intersects MD 494 (Fairview Road) 0.03 miles (0.048 km) before meeting MD 58 (Cearfoss Pike) and the county-maintained portion of Cearfoss Pike at a roundabout called the Cearfoss Roundabout. Shortly thereafter, the state highway reaches its northern terminus at the Pennsylvania state line. The highway continues as PA 163, which immediately turns east onto Mason Dixon Road to closely parallel the state line east to I-81 and US 11. Williamsport Pike continues north as a quadrant route called State Route 3001 toward the borough of Greencastle.

== History ==
Maryland Route 398
- Location: Williamsport–Cearfoss
- Existed: 1930–1957

MD 63 was originally assigned to Spielman Road between Spielman and Williamsport. The portion of the highway from Williamsport north to Cearfoss was originally MD 398, which was the descendant of the 19th century Williamsport and Greencastle Turnpike. MD 63 was paved from the Norfolk and Western Railway at Spielman west to Downsville in 1916. Spielman Road was paved from Downsville to Williamsport in 1933. MD 63 originally had its northern terminus at MD 68 at the southern town limit of Williamsport, now the corner of Artizan Street and Sunset Avenue. MD 68 followed Sunset Avenue from the direction of Lappans to the MD 63 junction, then turned north along Artizan Street to its northern terminus at US 11. MD 398 was paved from US 11 to the branch of Conococheague Creek just south of present-day I-81 in 1930. Greencastle Pike was constructed to Cearfoss by 1933.

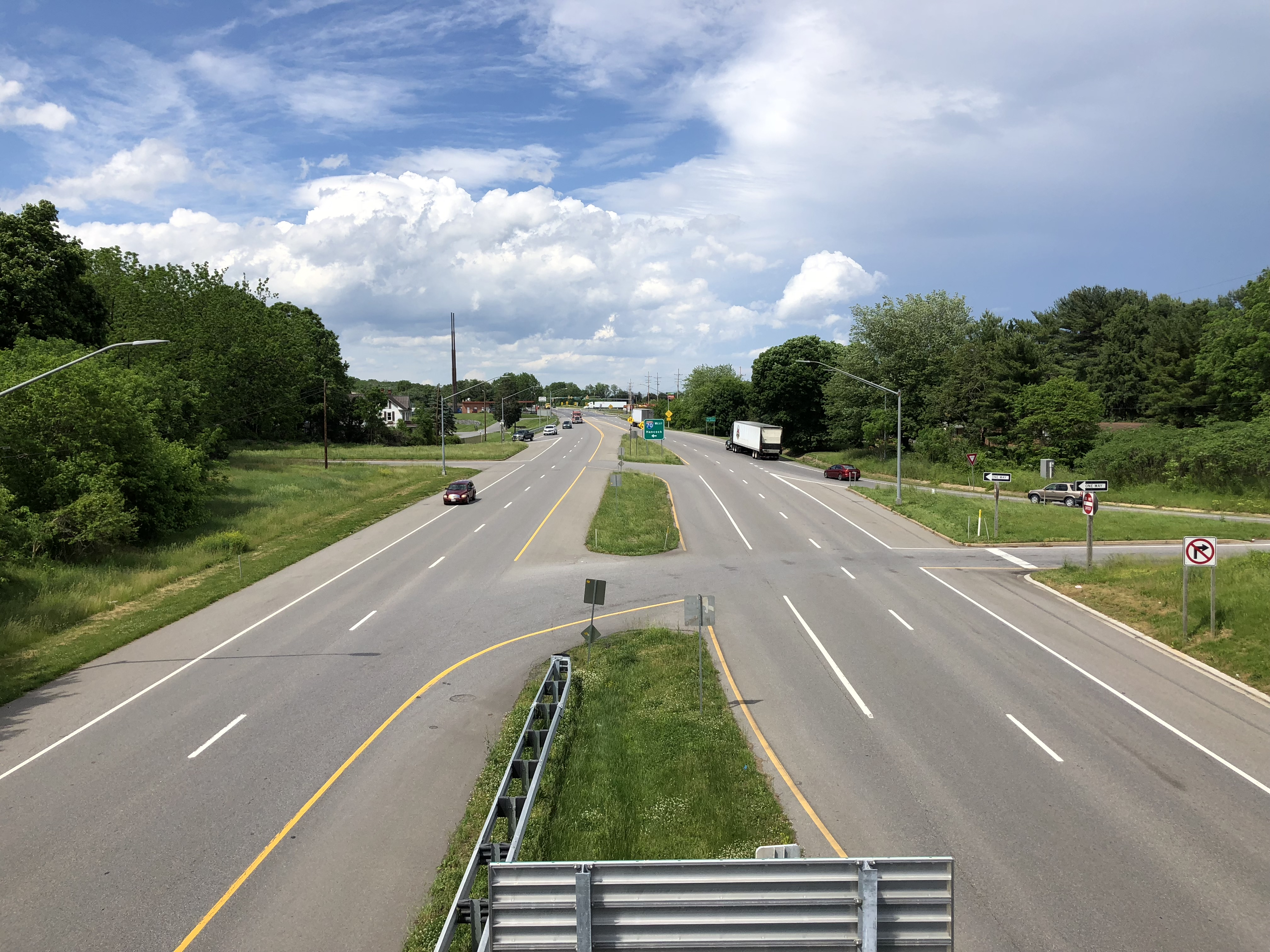
MD 63 northbound viewed from I-70 near Huyett

MD 63 began to take its modern form in the late 1950s. The MD 63 designation was extended east from Spielman to MD 65 in Fairplay in 1957. MD 63 was also extended north past US 11 and replaced MD 398 between Williamsport and Cearfoss. The state highway was extended north from Cearfoss to the Pennsylvania state line in 1958. Reconstruction and relocation of the highway from the northern limit of Williamsport to a short distance north of US 40 in Huyett began in 1957. The realignments bypassed what are now Honeyfield Road, Celeste Drive, Kemps Mill Road, and Rock Hill Road north of Williamsport and Huyett Lane in Huyett. The Williamsport–Huyett project included a bridge over the Western Maryland Railway that was completed in 1959. MD 63 was later expanded to a four-lane divided highway concurrent with the construction of its interchange with I-70, which opened in 1967 along with the stretch of I-70 from MD 68 to I-81.

Construction shifted to the south side of Williamsport in the mid-1960s. MD 68, which had been extended west to Clear Spring in 1956, was relocated south of Williamsport, replacing Sunset Avenue and what is now Kendle Road, in 1965. MD 68 was relocated for a grade separation of the Cumberland Valley Railroad and to tie into an interchange with I-81 and the south end of Conococheague Street. MD 63's route north into Williamsport, Artizan Street, was cut off by the construction of I-81, so the state highway joined MD 68 in a concurrency north to US 11. The new alignment of MD 63 and MD 68 was built as a four-lane divided highway around the interchange with I-81, which originally only contained ramps to and from the direction of West Virginia when the interchange opened with the completion of I-81 in 1966. That interchange was completed with ramps to and from Hagerstown between 1981 and 1989.

== Junction list ==
The entire route is in Washington County.

Location	mi	km	Destinations	Notes
Fairplay	0.00	0.00	MD 65 (Sharpsburg Pike) – Hagerstown, Sharpsburg	Southern terminus
Downsville	3.88	6.24	MD 632 north (Downsville Pike) – Hagerstown	Southern terminus of MD 632
Williamsport	6.70	10.78	MD 68 east (Lappans Road) – Boonsboro	South end of concurrency with MD 68
Williamsport	6.93	11.15	I-81 (Maryland Veterans Memorial Highway) – Harrisburg, Roanoke	I-81 Exit 1
Williamsport	7.91	12.73	US 11 south (Potomac Street) / MD 68 west (Conococheague Street) – Martinsburg, Clear Spring	MD 63 turns east onto Potomac Street; north end of concurrency with MD 68; south end of concurrency with US 11
Williamsport	8.04	12.94	US 11 north (Potomac Street) / Artizan Street south – Hagerstown	MD 63 turns north onto Artizan Street; north end of concurrency with US 11
Huyett	10.19	16.40	I-70 (Eisenhower Memorial Highway) – Hagerstown, Hancock	I-70 Exit 24
Huyett	11.78	18.96	US 40 (National Pike) – Hagerstown, Clear Spring	
Cearfoss	15.40	24.78	MD 494 west (Fairview Road) – Fairview	Eastern terminus of MD 494
Cearfoss	15.43	24.83	MD 58 east (Cearfoss Pike) / Cearfoss Pike west – Hagerstown, Mercersburg	Cearfoss Roundabout; western terminus of MD 58
Cearfoss	16.99	27.34	PA 163 east (Williamsport Pike) – Greencastle	Pennsylvania state line; northern terminus
1.000 mi = 1.609 km; 1.000 km = 0.621 mi: Concurrency terminus
