= Maryland Route 57 =

State highway in Washington County, Maryland, US, known as St. Paul Rd

Maryland Route 57
- St. Paul Road
- Maryland Route 57 highlighted in red

Route information
- Maintained by MDSHA
- Length: 4.02 mi (6.47 km)
- Existed: 1927–present

Major junctions
- South end: US 40 near Clear Spring
- North end: MD 494 near Fairview

Location
- Country: United States
- State: Maryland
- Counties: Washington

Highway system
- Maryland highway system; Interstate; US; State; Scenic Byways
← MD 56	→ MD 58

Maryland Route 57 (MD 57) is a state highway in the U.S. state of Maryland. Known as St. Paul Road, the state highway runs 4.02 miles (6.47 km) from U.S. Route 40 (US 40) near Clear Spring north to MD 494 near Fairview. MD 57 was constructed in stages between 1916 and 1933. The state highway originally extended to the Pennsylvania state line, but was rolled back in favor of MD 494 in the early 1960s.

== Route description ==
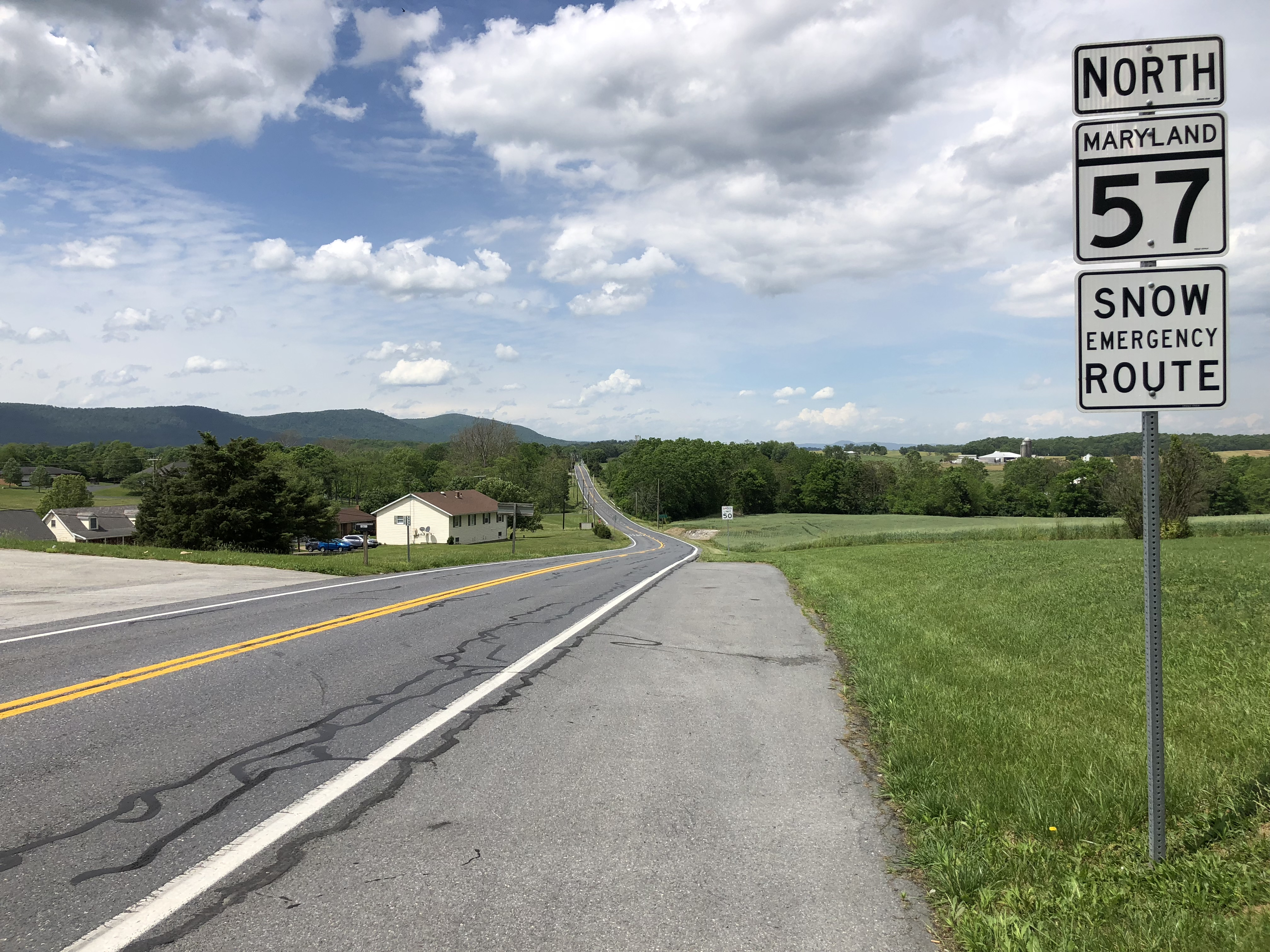
View north from the south end of MD 57 at US 40 near Clear Spring

MD 57 begins at an intersection with US 40 (National Pike) next to the highway's namesake, St. Paul's Church, east of the town of Clear Spring. After crossing Meadow Brook, the state highway heads north as a two-lane undivided road through farmland, intersecting Broadfording Road and passing over Rockdale Run. Immediately after crossing Dry Run, MD 57 reaches its northern terminus at MD 494 (Fairview Road) west of Fairview. St. Paul Road continues north as a county-maintained road to the Pennsylvania state line.

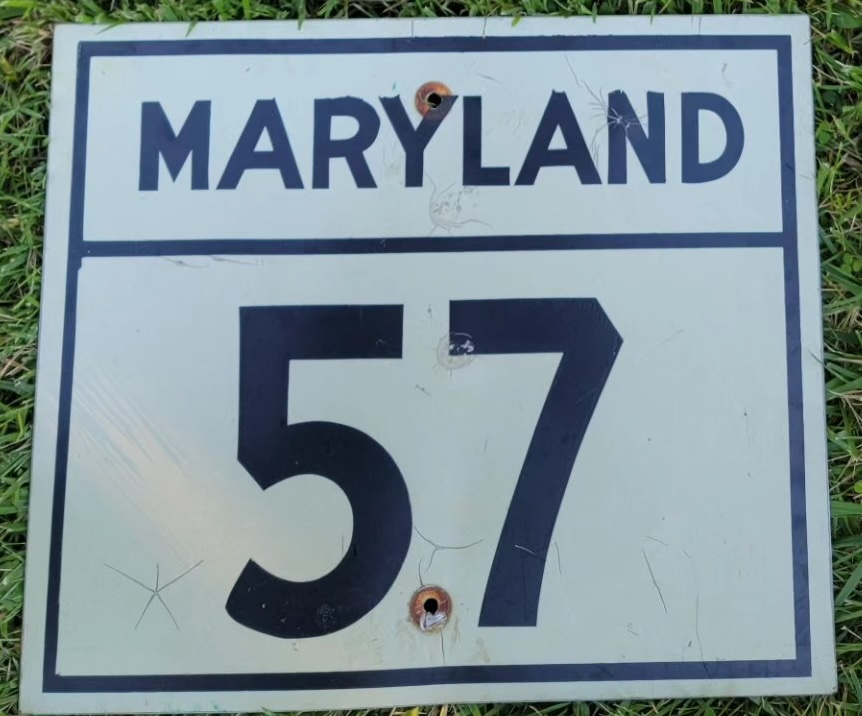
Route sign removed from truncated 1963 segment north of MD 494

== History ==
MD 57 was constructed as a state-aid road from US 40 to Broadfording Road around 1916. By 1921, the paved portion was extended north to Rockdale Run. The remainder of MD 57 and what is now MD 494 to the Pennsylvania state line were completed by 1933. The segment of MD 494 from MD 57 to the state line was originally part of MD 57. MD 57 was removed from the run to the state line in favor of MD 494 in 1963.

== Junction list ==
The entire route is in Washington County.

Location	mi	km	Destinations	Notes
Clear Spring	0.00	0.00	US 40 (National Pike) – Hagerstown, Hancock	Southern terminus
Fairview	4.02	6.47	MD 494 (Fairview Road) – Cearfoss, Mercersburg, PA	Northern terminus
1.000 mi = 1.609 km; 1.000 km = 0.621 mi
