= Maryland Route 494 =

State highway in Maryland

Maryland Route 494
- Fairview Road
- Maryland Route 494 highlighted in red

Route information
- Maintained by MDSHA
- Length: 6.83 mi (10.99 km)
- Existed: 1933–present

Major junctions
- West end: PA 75 near Fairview
- MD 57 in Fairview
- East end: MD 63 in Cearfoss

Location
- Country: United States
- State: Maryland
- Counties: Washington

Highway system
- Maryland highway system; Interstate; US; State; Scenic Byways
← MD 491	→ I-495

Maryland Route 494 (MD 494) is a state highway in the U.S. state of Maryland. Known as Fairview Road, the state highway runs 6.83 miles (10.99 km) from the Pennsylvania state line near Fairview, where the highway continues north as Pennsylvania Route 75 (PA 75), east to MD 63 in Cearfoss. MD 494 was constructed in the 1930s. The state highway originally ended at MD 57, but was extended to the state line in the early 1960s.

== Route description ==
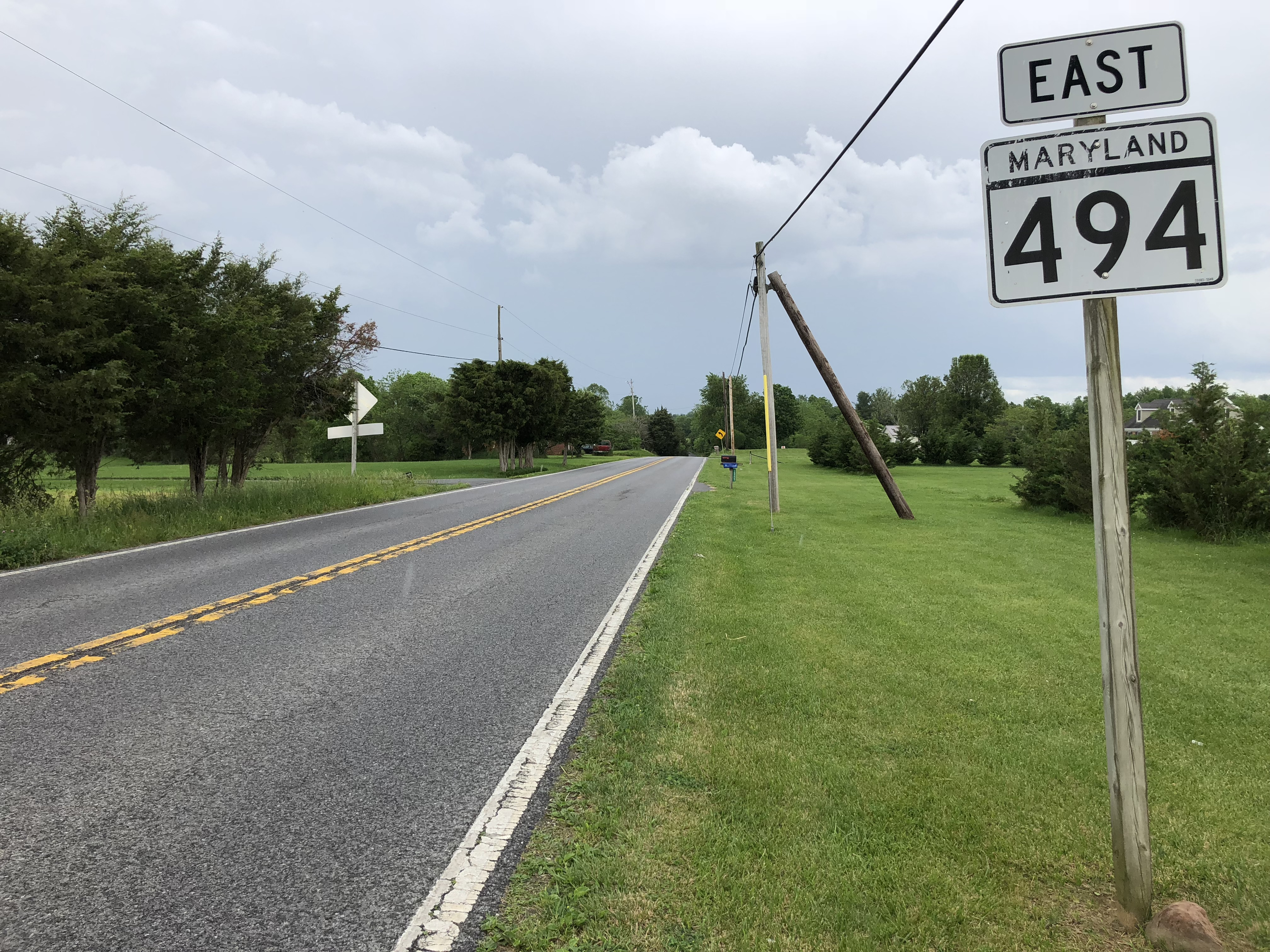
View east along MD 494 east of Fairview

MD 494 begins at the Pennsylvania state line near Fairview. The highway continues north across the state line as PA 75 (Fort Loudon Road) toward Mercersburg. MD 494 heads southeast as a two-lane undivided highway toward an intersection with MD 57 (St. Paul Road). From there, the state highway heads east through farmland and scattered residences, passing through the hamlet of Fairview. MD 494 intersects Rockdale Road, which leads to the Joseph Fiery House, before crossing Conococheague Creek. MD 494 crosses Toms Run and passes Broadfording Church Road before reaching its eastern terminus at MD 63 (Greencastle Pike) in Cearfoss. This intersection is 0.03 miles (0.048 km) south of the Cearfoss Roundabout where MD 63 meets MD 58 (Cearfoss Pike).

== History ==
MD 494 was paved from the Pennsylvania state line east to Toms Run, including the bridge over Conococheague Creek, by 1933. Another segment from Cearfoss to Broadfording Church Road was completed in 1935. The gap was filled when construction was completed west of Cearfoss in 1939. The segment of MD 494 from MD 57 to the state line was originally part of MD 57. MD 57 was removed from the run to the state line in favor of MD 494 in 1963.

== Junction list ==
The entire route is in Washington County.

Location	mi	km	Destinations	Notes
Fairview	0.00	0.00	PA 75 north (Fort Loudon Road) – Mercersburg	Pennsylvania state line; western terminus
Fairview	0.84	1.35	MD 57 south (St. Paul Road) – Clear Spring	Northern terminus of MD 57
Cearfoss	6.83	10.99	MD 63 (Greencastle Pike) to MD 58 – Williamsport, Hagerstown, Greencastle, PA	Eastern terminus
1.000 mi = 1.609 km; 1.000 km = 0.621 mi
