= MD 11 =

MD 11 may refer to:

- U.S. Route 11 in Maryland, a roadway in Maryland, US.
- McDonnell Douglas MD-11, a tri-jet airliner.
