= Hagerstown Police Department (Maryland) =

Police department in Maryland, US

Coordinates: 39°38′45″N 77°43′35″W

Hagerstown Police patch

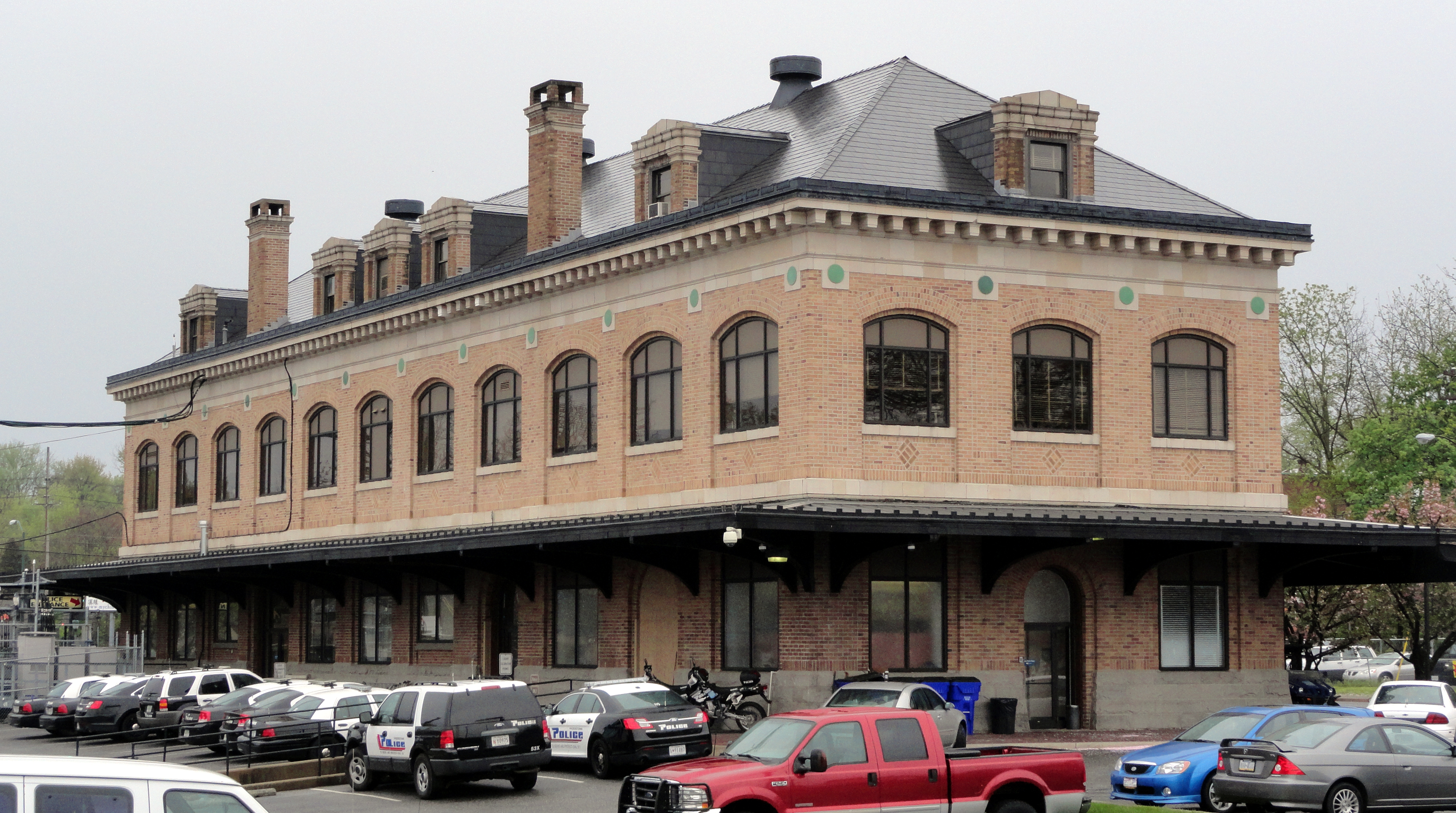
Hagerstown Police Department

The Hagerstown Police Department is a full-service, 24/7 law enforcement agency serving a population of 43,527 (US Census Estimate 2020) in 12.56 square miles (32.5 km^{2}) within the municipality of Hagerstown, Maryland, county seat of Washington County. Hagerstown closely borders Pennsylvania, West Virginia, and Virginia.

== History ==
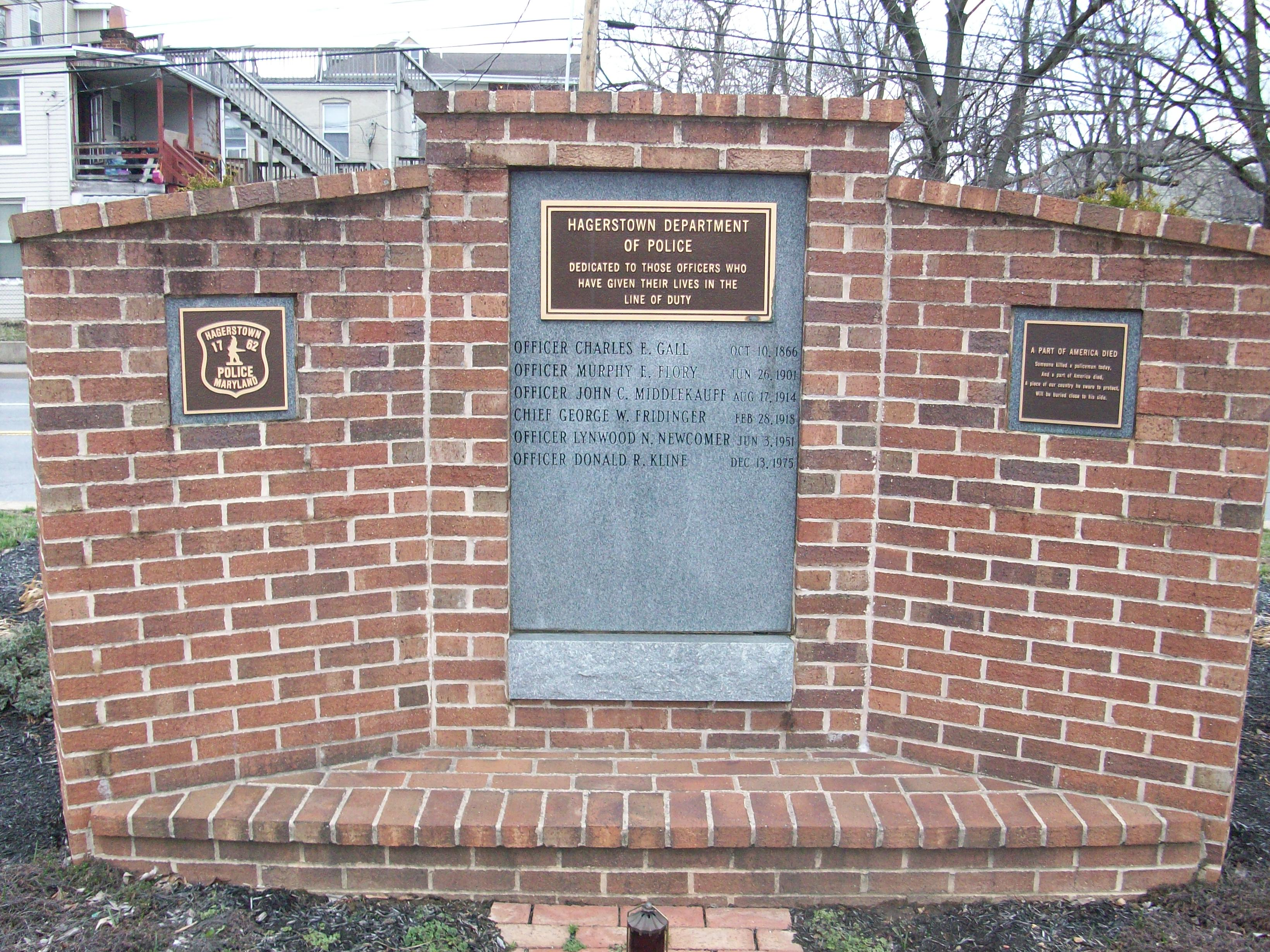
Hagerstown Police Memorial

On May 24, 1824 the council created the modern Hagerstown Police Department.

There have been six line-of-duty deaths within the HPD.

- Officer Charles E. Gall, EOW October 10, 1866
- Officer Murphy E. Flory, EOW June 26, 1901
- Officer John C. Middlekauff, EOW August 17, 1914
- Chief of Police George W. Fridinger, EOW February 28, 1918
- Officer Lynwood N. Vewcomer, EOW June 3, 1951
- Officer Donald Ralph Kline, EOW December 13, 1975

HPD has had a total of 23 Chiefs of Police since 1867

- 1867 - 1870 .... William Freaner
- 1882 - 1893 .... D. Williamson
- 1893 - 1909 .... John E. Benner/Alexander John E. Benner (one source has Benner retiring in 1900.)
- 1912 - 1918 .... George W. Fridinger
- 1918 - 1931 .... Thomas H. Barber
- 1931 - 1933 .... J.J. Cassidy
- 1933 - 1937 .... Clarence G. Emmert
- 1937 - 1940 .... Carl H. McCleary
- 1940 - 1943 .... William H. Peters
- 1943 - 1946 .... Max M. Rickard
- 1946 - 1956 .... Jesse Bailey Brown
- 1958 - 1966 .... Blair P. Overton
- 1966 - 1968 .... Harold Kisner (Acting)
- 1968 - 1968 .... Grayson Wigfield (Acting)
- 1968 - 1972 .... Grayson F. Doarnberger
- 1972 - 1986 .... Clinton E. Mowen
- 1986 - 1993 .... Paul L. Wood
- 1993 - 1994 .... Robert I. Hart (Acting)
- 1994 - 1999 .... Dale J. Jones
- 1999 - 2000 .... Robert I. Hart (Acting)
- 2000 - 2012 .... Arthur Smith (Charles Summers, Acting while Smith was in Afghanistan.)
- 2012 - 2015 .... Mark Holtzman
- 2015 - 2016 .... Paul Kifer (Acting)
- 2016 - 2018 .... Victor Brito
- 2018–Present .... Paul Kifer

== Organization ==
Captain Paul “Joey” Kifer is Hagerstown's current Chief of Police .

The current headquarters of HPD is 50 North Burhans Boulevard (US 11). Before being renovated for law enforcement use, the building was the Western Maryland Railway Passenger Station.

== See also ==
- List of law enforcement agencies in Maryland
