= Huyett, Maryland =

Unincorporated community in Maryland, US

Coordinates: 39.65149°N 77.79935°W

Huyett (also known as Huyetts Crossroads) is an unincorporated community not considered as a census-designated place (CDP) in western Washington County, Maryland, United States. It is located north of Williamsport and south of Cearfoss on Maryland Route 63 and on U.S. Route 40, west of Hagerstown and east of Clear Spring. Huyett is officially included in the Hagerstown Metropolitan Area (Hagerstown-Martinsburg, MD-WV Metropolitan Statistical Area).

Many trucking firms and transportation related businesses of the Hagerstown area are located in Huyett. The community benefits from easy access to both Interstate 70 via exit 24 (MD 63) and Interstate 81 via exit 6B (US 40).
