= Pennsylvania Route 163 =

State highway in Franklin County, Pennsylvania, US

Pennsylvania Route 163
- Pennsylvania Route 163 highlighted in red

Route information
- Maintained by PennDOT
- Length: 2.384 mi (3.837 km)

Major junctions
- West end: MD 63 in Antrim Township
- I-81 in State Line
- East end: US 11 in State Line

Location
- Country: United States
- State: Pennsylvania
- Counties: Franklin

Highway system
- Pennsylvania State Route System; Interstate; US; State; Scenic; Legislative
← PA 162	→ PA 164

Pennsylvania Route 163 (PA 163) is a state highway in the U.S. state of Pennsylvania. The state highway, which is a two-lane undivided road its entire length, runs 2.384 miles (3.837 km) from the Maryland state line, where the highway continues south as Maryland Route 63 (MD 63), east to U.S. Route 11 (US 11) in Antrim Township in southern Franklin County. The route begins at the Maryland border by following Williamsport Pike north before it quickly turns east onto Mason Dixon Road, with State Route 3001 (SR 3001) continuing north on Williamsport Pike. PA 163 runs immediately to the north of the state line along Mason Dixon Road, coming to an interchange at Interstate 81 (I-81) before ending at US 11. The Williamsport Pike section of the route was originally a 19th-century turnpike connecting Williamsport, Maryland, with Greencastle, Pennsylvania. Williamsport Pike was paved by 1930 while Mason Dixon Road was paved in the 1930s. PA 163 was designated to its present alignment in the 1960s.

== Route description ==
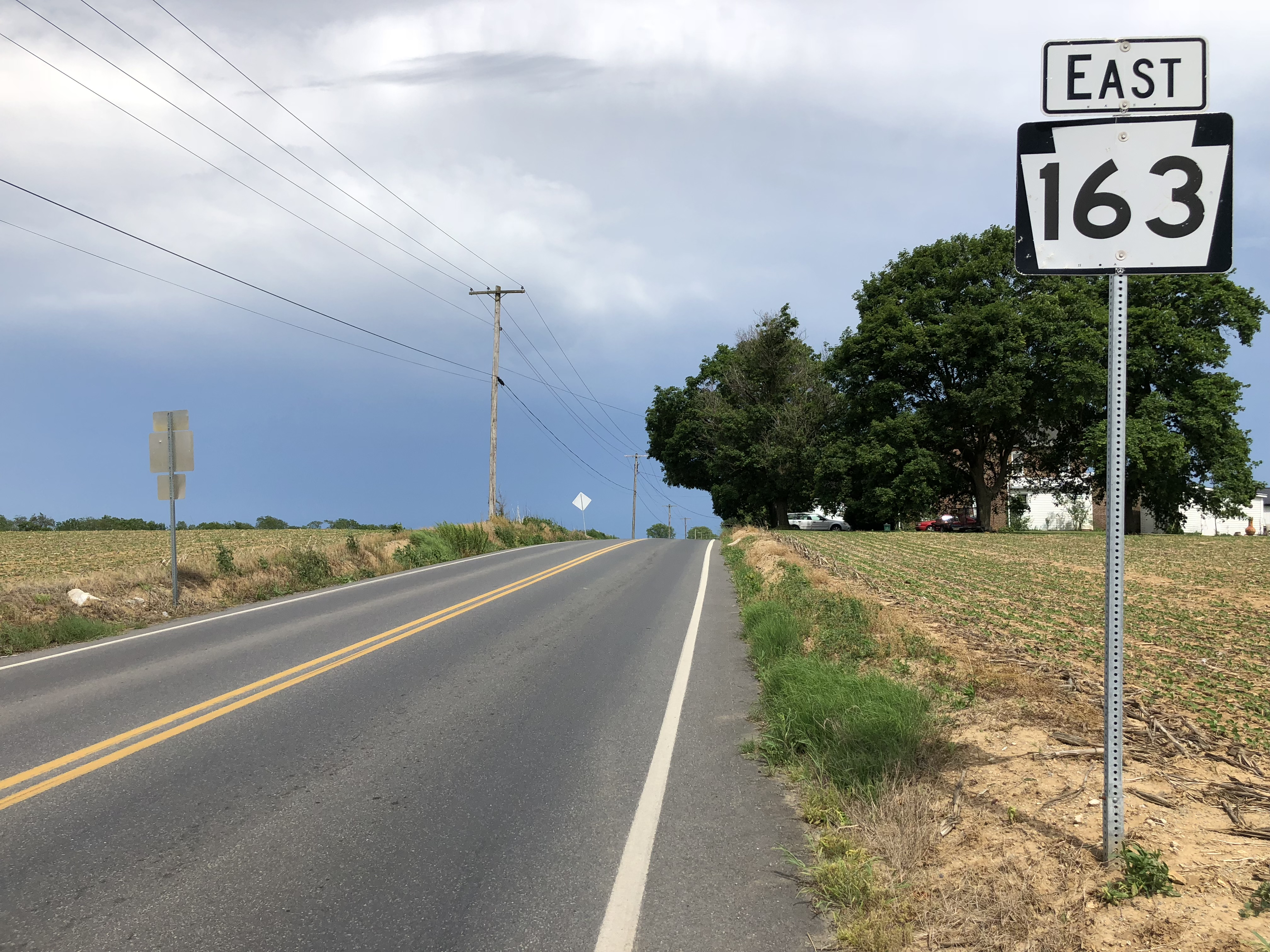
PA 163 eastbound past Williamsport Pike in Antrim Township

PA 163 begins at the Maryland state line in Antrim Township. The roadway continues south as MD 63 (Greencastle Pike) toward Cearfoss and the town of Williamsport. PA 163 begins heading north from the state line on two-lane undivided Williamsport Pike, then immediately turns east onto Mason Dixon Road. Williamsport Pike continues north as SR 3001, an unsigned quadrant route, toward the borough of Greencastle. PA 163 parallels the north side of the Maryland–Pennsylvania state line at a distance of about 200 feet (61 m) at Williamsport Pike. The distance reduces to less than 50 feet (15 m) after the state highway crosses Norfolk Southern Railway's Lurgan Branch at-grade. PA 163 continues east through farmland, intersecting Maugansville Road on the Maryland side before reaching its interchange with I-81 (American Legion Memorial Highway). The ramps to and from southbound I-81 are on the Maryland side of the highway, while the ramps to and from northbound I-81 are in Pennsylvania. PA 163 continues east into the unincorporated village of State Line where the highway reaches its eastern terminus at US 11 (Molly Pitcher Highway) just north of where US 11 enters Maryland.

== History ==
The small north-south section of present-day PA 163 between the Maryland border and Mason Dixon Road was part of a 19th-century turnpike known as the Williamsport and Greencastle Turnpike, which connected Williamsport, Maryland with Greencastle, Pennsylvania. When Pennsylvania legislated routes in 1911, what is now PA 163 was not given a number. By 1930, Williamsport Pike was an unnumbered paved road. Mason Dixon Road was paved in the 1930s. PA 163 was designated in the 1960s to run along its current alignment between MD 63 at the Maryland border and US 11 in State Line, with an interchange at I-81.

== Major intersections ==
The entire route is in Antrim Township, Franklin County.

mi	km	Destinations	Notes
0.000	0.000	MD 63 south (Greencastle Pike) – Cearfoss	Maryland state line; western terminius
0.026	0.042	SR 3001 north (Williamsport Pike) – Greencastle	PA 163 turns east onto Mason Dixon Road
1.909	3.072	I-81 (American Legion Memorial Highway) – Chambersburg, Hagerstown	I-81 Exit 1; southbound I-81 ramps are in Maryland and northbound I-81 ramps are in Pennsylvania
2.384	3.837	US 11 (Molly Pitcher Highway) – Chambersburg, Hagerstown	Eastern terminus
1.000 mi = 1.609 km; 1.000 km = 0.621 mi
