= Maryland Route 58 =

State highway in Washington County, Maryland, US

Maryland Route 58
- Maryland Route 58 highlighted in red

Route information
- Maintained by MDSHA
- Length: 3.53 mi (5.68 km)
- Existed: 1928–present

Major junctions
- West end: MD 63 in Cearfoss
- I-81 in Hagerstown
- East end: Salem Avenue / Key Circle in Hagerstown

Location
- Country: United States
- State: Maryland
- Counties: Washington

Highway system
- Maryland highway system; Interstate; US; State; Scenic Byways
← MD 57	→ MD 60

Maryland Route 58 (MD 58) is a state highway in the U.S. state of Maryland. Known for most of its length as Cearfoss Pike, the state highway runs 3.53 miles (5.68 km) from MD 63 in Cearfoss east to Key Circle in Hagerstown. MD 58 was constructed in the late 1920s along what was originally a turnpike called the Hagerstown and Cross Roads Turnpike.

== Route description ==
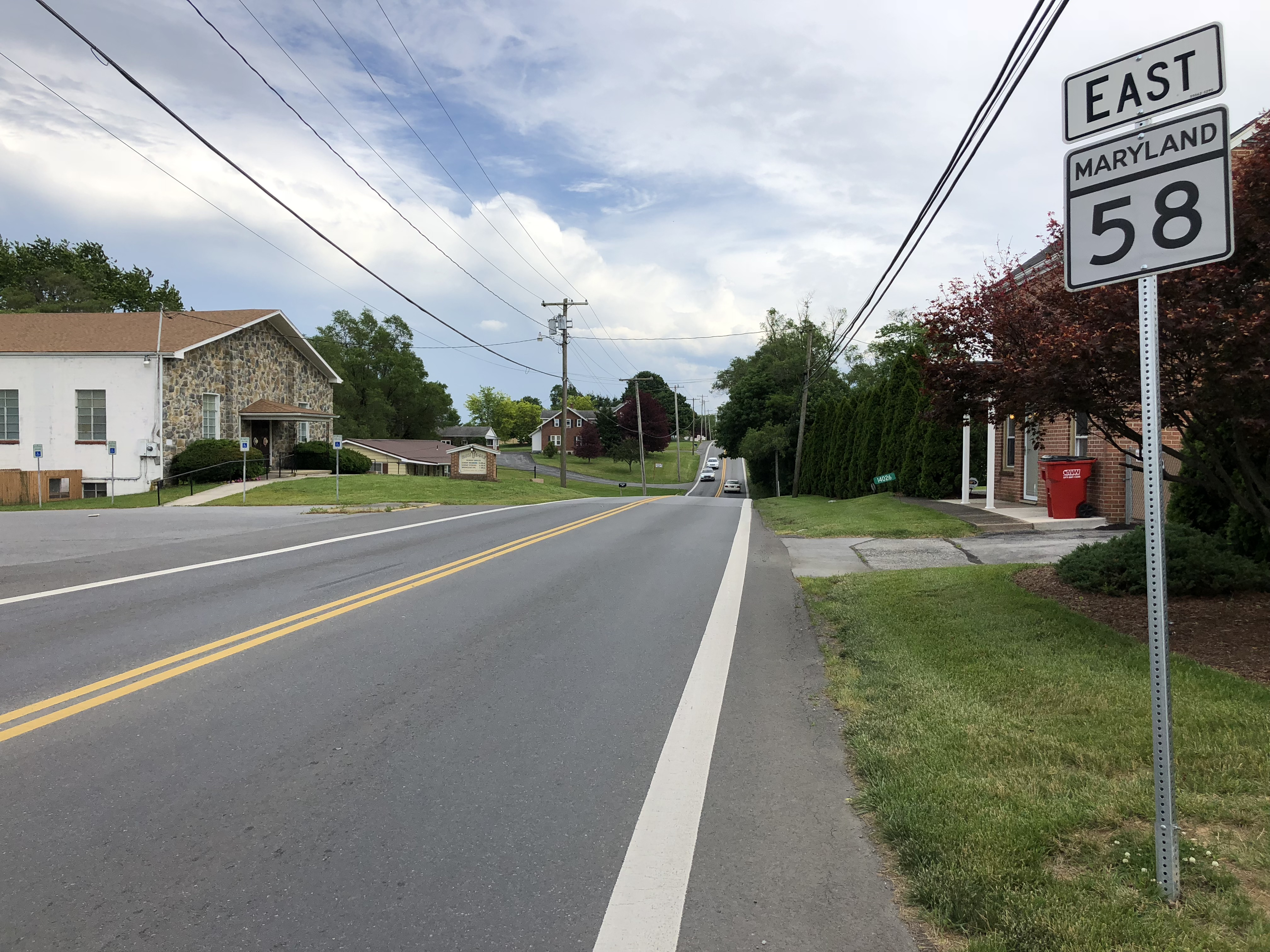
View east from the west end of MD 58 at MD 63 in Cearfoss

MD 58 begins at the Cearfoss Roundabout in Cearfoss, where the highway intersects MD 63 (Greencastle Pike) and the county-maintained portion of Cearfoss Pike, which heads northwest toward the borough of Mercersburg, Pennsylvania, becoming Pennsylvania Route 416 at the Pennsylvania state line. The roundabout is 0.03 miles (0.048 km) north of MD 63's intersection with MD 494 (Fairview Road). MD 58 heads southeast as two-lane undivided Cearfoss Pike through farmland and scattered residences. Between Point Salem Road and Terps Boulevard, MD 58 expands to a four-lane divided highway and meets Interstate 81 (I-81, Maryland Veterans Memorial Highway) at a partial cloverleaf interchange. Within the interchange, the state highway enters the city of Hagerstown and its name changes to Salem Avenue. The road passes northeast of a park and ride lot past the interchange. East of I-81, MD 58 enters a densely populated residential area, reduces to a two-lane undivided street, and reaches its eastern terminus at the intersection with Key Circle. Salem Avenue continues southeast as a municipal street toward downtown Hagerstown.

== History ==
The predecessor highway of MD 58 was the 19th century Hagerstown and Cross Roads Turnpike, which followed essentially the same alignment as modern MD 58 between the tollgate at Broadfording Road, now just east of I-81, and Cearfoss. What is now the county-maintained portion of Cearfoss Pike was originally the Mercersburg Road. About 1 mile (1.6 km) of that county highway from Cearfoss to Conococheague Creek was paved as a state-aid road in 1916 but was not taken into the state road system and was never part of MD 58. MD 58 was paved from Broadfording Road to Garden View Road in 1928 and extended to Cearfoss in 1930. The state highway was rebuilt starting in 1956; the highway was expanded at that time to a four-lane divided highway around its interchange with I-81, which was completed in 1958. The Cearfoss Roundabout at the state highway's western terminus was constructed in 1995.

== Junction list ==
The entire route is in Washington County.

Location	mi	km	Destinations	Notes
Cearfoss	0.00	0.00	MD 63 (Greencastle Pike) to MD 494 / Cearfoss Pike west – Williamsport, Greencastle, Mercersburg	Cearfoss Roundabout; western terminus
Hagerstown	3.19	5.13	I-81 (Maryland Veterans Memorial Highway) – Harrisburg, Roanoke	I-81 Exit 7
Hagerstown	3.53	5.68	Salem Avenue east / Key Circle south	Eastern terminus
1.000 mi = 1.609 km; 1.000 km = 0.621 mi
