= Hagerstown station =

Historic railway station in Maryland, US

Hagerstown Station
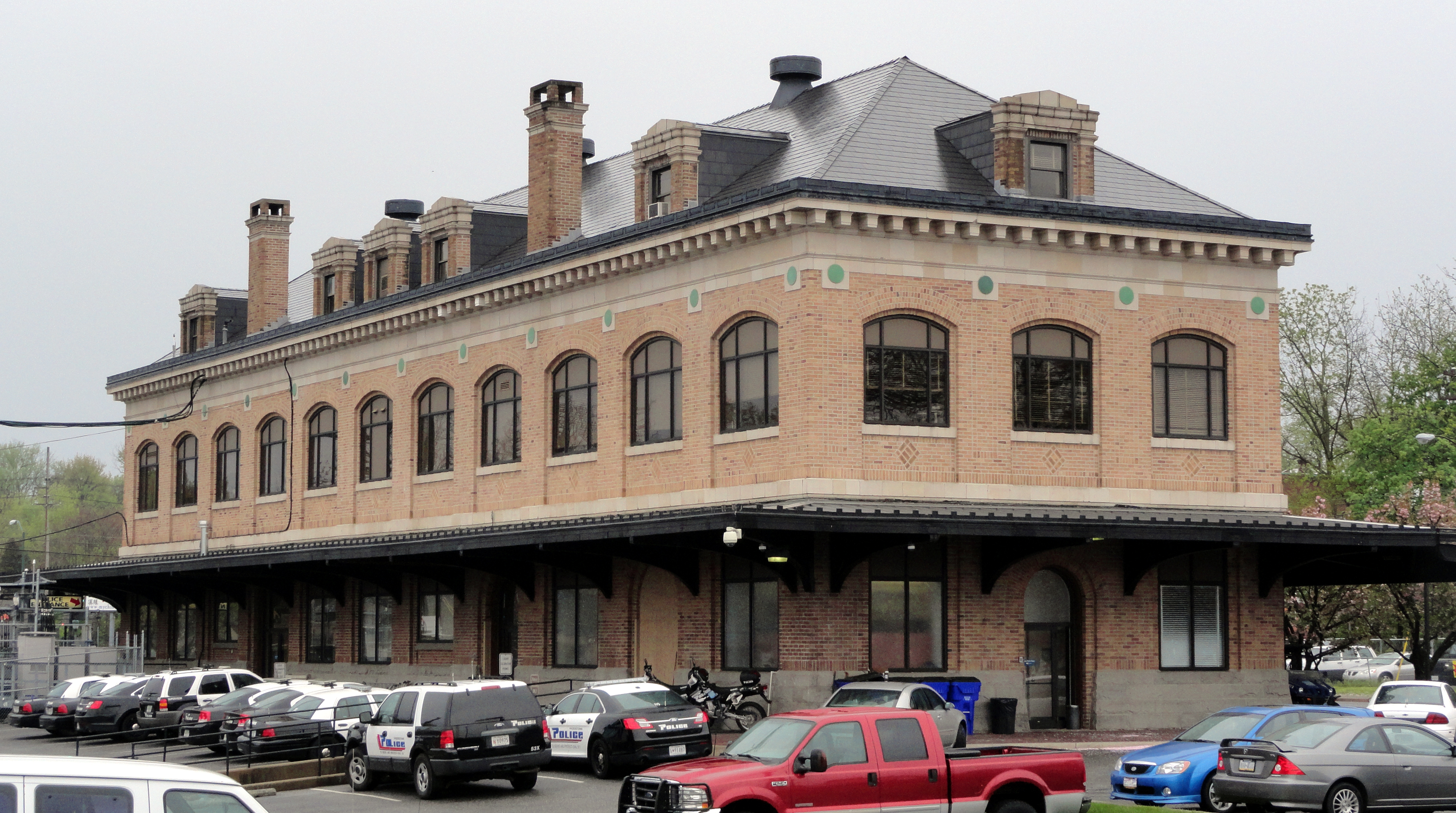
- The former train station in 2013, now used as a police station.

General information
- Location: Burhans Blvd., Hagerstown, Maryland
- Coordinates: 39°38′45″N 77°43′34″W
- Owner: Chessie System, Real Estate and Industrial Deyelopment Department
- Train operators: Western Maryland Railway

Construction
- Accessible: No

History
- Opened: 1913
Former services
Preceding station	Western Maryland Railway	Following station
Williamsport toward Cumberland	Main Line	Chewsville toward Baltimore Hillen
Terminus	Hagerstown - Shippensburg	Waynecastle toward Shippensburg
- Western Maryland Railway Station
- U.S. National Register of Historic Places
- Area: 1.5 acres (0.61 ha)
- NRHP reference No.: 76001019
- Added to NRHP: April 22, 1976
Location

Hagerstown station is a historic railway station in Hagerstown, Washington County, Maryland. It was built in 1913 as a stop for the Western Maryland Railway. It is a 2 1/2-story hip roof brick building, reflecting the influence of the Commercial Style of the early 20th century. The building features overscaled classical detailing, a stone foundation, and a massive, modillioned cornice with stone disks defining each bay. The building is also encircled by a one-story porch that has a cantilevered roof on three sides.

The Western Maryland Railway ended passenger train service to the Hagerstown station in June 1957.

The station was listed on the National Register of Historic Places in 1976 as the Western Maryland Railway Station. The building is now used as the headquarters of the Hagerstown Police Department.
