= Fairplay, Maryland =

Unincorporated community in Maryland, United States

- Census-designated place
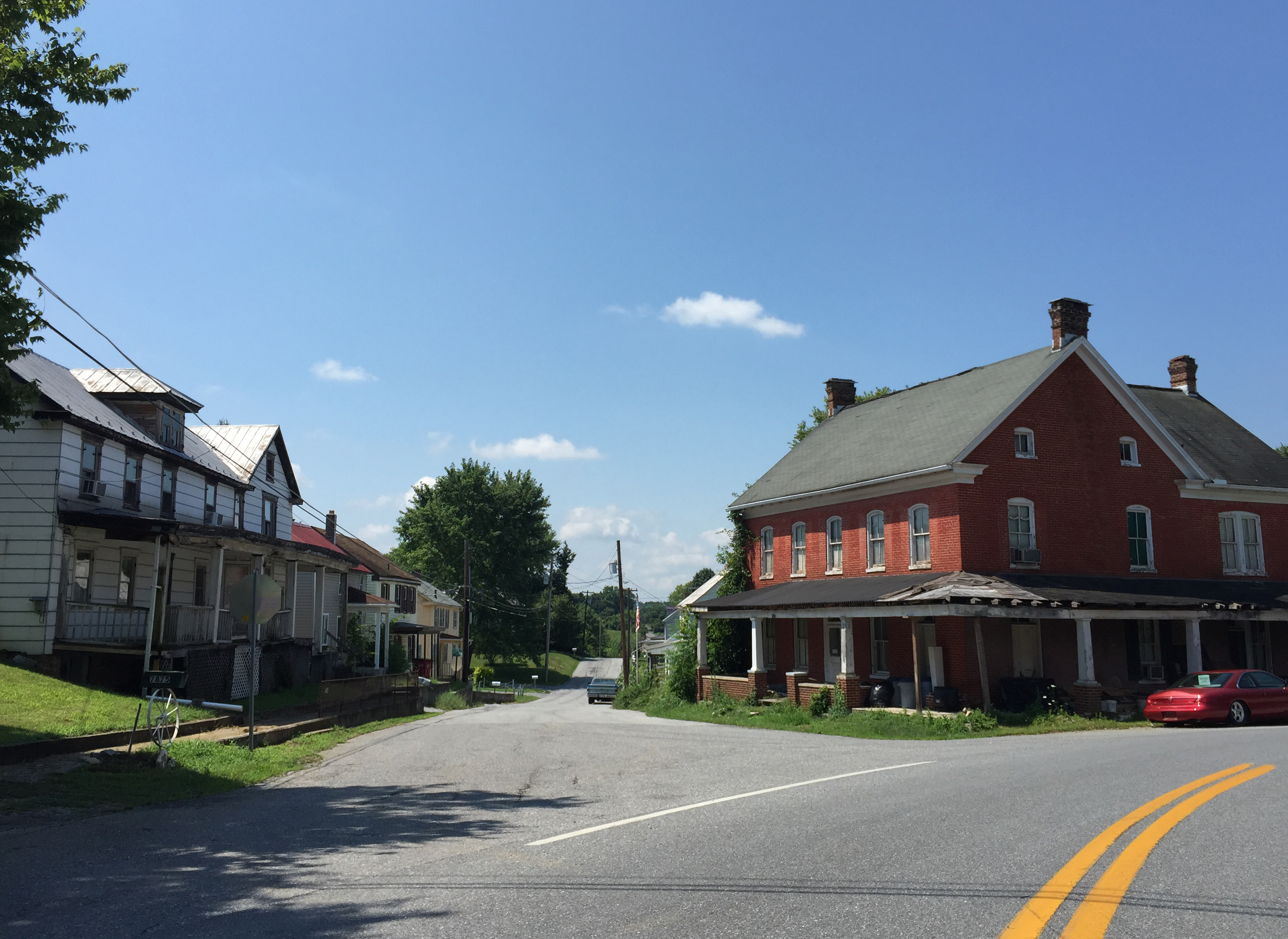
- Houses along Fairplay Road and Spielman Road in Fairplay

- Location within Maryland Location within the United States
- Coordinates: 39°31′58″N 77°45′00″W
- Country: United States
- State: Maryland
- County: Washington

Area
  - Total: 1.20 sq mi (3.12 km^{2})
  - Land: 1.20 sq mi (3.12 km^{2})
  - Water: 0 sq mi (0.00 km^{2})
- Elevation: 482 ft (147 m)

Population (2020)
  - Total: 537
  - Density: 446.0/sq mi (172.19/km^{2})
- Time zone: UTC-5 (Eastern (EST))
  - Summer (DST): UTC-4 (EDT)
- ZIP code: 21733
- Area codes: 301, 240
- FIPS code: 24-27425
- GNIS feature ID: 2583617

Fairplay is an unincorporated community and census-designated place (CDP) in Washington County, Maryland, United States. Its population was 580 as of the 2010 census. It is sometimes recognized, along with neighboring Tilghmanton, as Fairplay-Tilghmanton; the two communities share a post office as well as a fire company. Fairplay is located between Hagerstown and Sharpsburg, along Maryland Route 65 and is part of the Hagerstown Metropolitan Area. Marsh Mills was listed on the National Register of Historic Places in 1996.

According to tradition, Fairplay was so named on account of the welcoming nature of the first settlers.

== Geography ==
According to the U.S. Census Bureau, the community has an area of 1.204 square miles (3.12 km^{2}), all land.

== Demographics ==
Historical population
Census	Pop.	Note	%±
2020	537		—
U.S. Decennial Census
