= Marsh Mills =

Historic house in Maryland, United States

- U.S. National Register of Historic Places
- Location within Maryland Location within the United States
- Location: 17426 and 17432 Spielman Rd., Fairplay, Maryland
- Coordinates: 39°32′19.1″N 77°45′44.5″W
- Area: 12 acres (4.9 ha)
- Built: 1850
- Architectural style: Greek Revival
- NRHP reference No.: 96001375
- Added to NRHP: November 22, 1996

Marsh Mills, also known as Haley's Mill or Spielman Mill, is a historic home located at Fairplay, Washington County, Maryland, United States. It is a 2 1/2-story, three-bay-wide limestone house. The structure was built about 1850 as a mill, then converted to a creamery in the 1880s. Traces of the millrace are still visible where it exits the south end of the building and passes beneath the road. Also on the property is an American Foursquare–style frame house which may incorporate remnants of the original log house which served as the original miller's dwelling.

Marsh Mills was listed on the National Register of Historic Places in 1996.
