= Maugansville, Maryland =

- CDP
- Location of Maugansville, Maryland
- Coordinates: 39°41′31″N 77°45′05″W
- Country: United States
- State: Maryland
- County: Washington

Area
  - Total: 2.45 sq mi (6.34 km^{2})
  - Land: 2.45 sq mi (6.34 km^{2})
  - Water: 0 sq mi (0.00 km^{2})
- Elevation: 607 ft (185 m)

Population (2020)
  - Total: 3,669
  - Density: 1,499/sq mi (578.7/km^{2})
- Time zone: UTC−5 (Eastern (EST))
  - Summer (DST): UTC−4 (EDT)
- ZIP code: 21767
- Area codes: 301, 240
- FIPS code: 24-51425
- GNIS feature ID: 2390136

Maugansville is a census-designated place (CDP) in Washington County, Maryland, United States. The population was 2,295 at the 2000 census.

== Geography ==
According to the United States Census Bureau, the CDP has a total area of 2.2 square miles (5.7 km^{2}), all land.

== Demographics ==
Historical population
Census	Pop.	Note	%±
2020	3,669		—
U.S. Decennial Census

=== 2020 census ===
As of the 2020 census, Maugansville had a population of 3,669. The median age was 42.7 years. 22.3% of residents were under the age of 18 and 19.7% of residents were 65 years of age or older. For every 100 females there were 94.3 males, and for every 100 females age 18 and over there were 88.7 males age 18 and over.

98.1% of residents lived in urban areas, while 1.9% lived in rural areas.

There were 1,462 households in Maugansville, of which 30.3% had children under the age of 18 living in them. Of all households, 48.9% were married-couple households, 17.2% were households with a male householder and no spouse or partner present, and 27.0% were households with a female householder and no spouse or partner present. About 26.8% of all households were made up of individuals and 11.9% had someone living alone who was 65 years of age or older.

There were 1,550 housing units, of which 5.7% were vacant. The homeowner vacancy rate was 2.2% and the rental vacancy rate was 6.4%.

Racial composition as of the 2020 census
Race	Number	Percent
White	2,928	79.8%
Black or African American	312	8.5%
American Indian and Alaska Native	18	0.5%
Asian	92	2.5%
Native Hawaiian and Other Pacific Islander	0	0.0%
Some other race	74	2.0%
Two or more races	245	6.7%
Hispanic or Latino (of any race)	218	5.9%

=== 2000 census ===
At the 2000 census there were 2,295 people, 912 households, and 667 families living in the CDP. The population density was 1,049.8 inhabitants per square mile (405.3/km^{2}). There were 941 housing units at an average density of 430.4 per square mile (166.2/km^{2}). The racial makeup of the CDP was 97.34% White, 0.52% African American, 0.22% Native American, 0.74% Asian, 0.39% from other races, and 0.78% from two or more races. Hispanic or Latino of any race were 1.05%.

Of the 912 households, 31.4% had children under the age of 18 living with them, 61.2% were married couples living together, 9.4% had a female householder with no husband present, and 26.8% were non-families. 24.1% of households were one person and 11.3% were one person aged 65 or older. The average household size was 2.48 and the average family size was 2.93.

The age distribution was 23.9% under the age of 18, 7.6% from 18 to 24, 27.6% from 25 to 44, 24.5% from 45 to 64, and 16.4% 65 or older. The median age was 39 years. For every 100 females, there were 92.4 males. For every 100 females age 18 and over, there were 84.1 males.

The median household income was $45,391 and the median family income was $51,875. Males had a median income of $34,286 versus $24,329 for females. The per capita income for the CDP was $20,907. About 2.9% of families and 6.7% of the population were below the poverty line, including 2.4% of those under age 18 and 13.5% of those age 65 or over.
