= Cearfoss, Maryland =

Unincorporated community in Maryland, United States

- Census-designated place
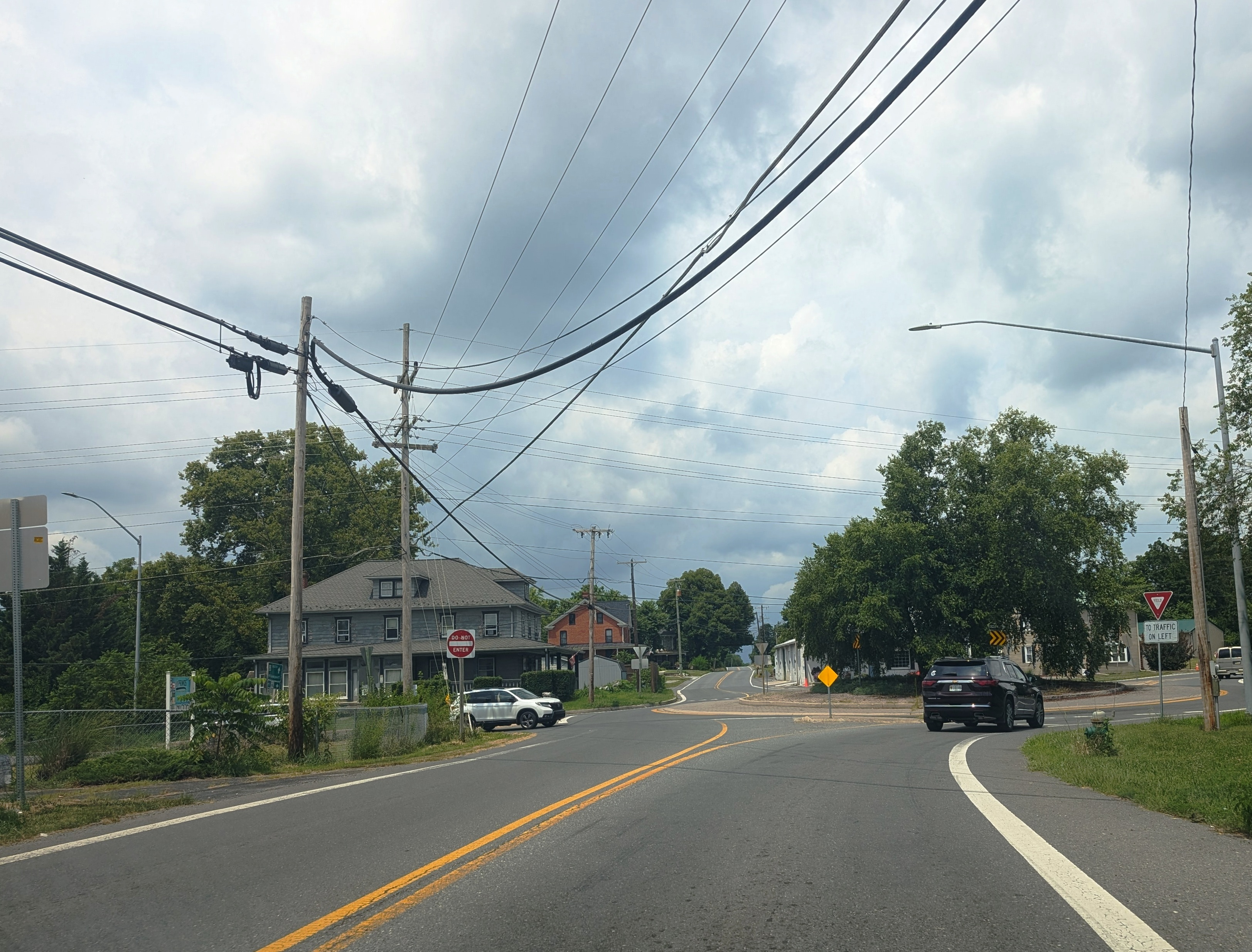
- MD 58 westbound at a roundabout in the center of the community

- Location within Maryland Location within the United States
- Coordinates: 39°42′03″N 77°46′32″W
- Country: United States
- State: Maryland
- County: Washington

Area
  - Total: 0.20 sq mi (0.52 km^{2})
  - Land: 0.20 sq mi (0.52 km^{2})
  - Water: 0 sq mi (0.00 km^{2})
- Elevation: 499 ft (152 m)

Population (2020)
  - Total: 176
  - Density: 875.1/sq mi (337.88/km^{2})
- Time zone: UTC−5 (Eastern (EST))
  - Summer (DST): UTC−4 (EDT)
- ZIP code: 21740
- Area codes: 301, 240
- FIPS code: 24-14300
- GNIS feature ID: 2583595

Cearfoss is an unincorporated community and census-designated place in northwestern Washington County, Maryland, United States. Its population was 178 as of the 2010 census. Cearfoss is located northwest of Hagerstown and Maugansville, near the Pennsylvania border. Many highways intersect in Cearfoss in a roundabout, including Maryland routes 58, 63 and 494. Cearfoss is officially included in the Hagerstown Metropolitan Area (Hagerstown-Martinsburg, MD-WV Metropolitan Statistical Area).

== Geography ==
According to the U.S. Census Bureau, the community has an area of 0.201 square miles (0.52 km^{2}), all land.

== Demographics ==
Historical population
Census	Pop.	Note	%±
2020	176		—
U.S. Decennial Census
