= Lurgan Branch =

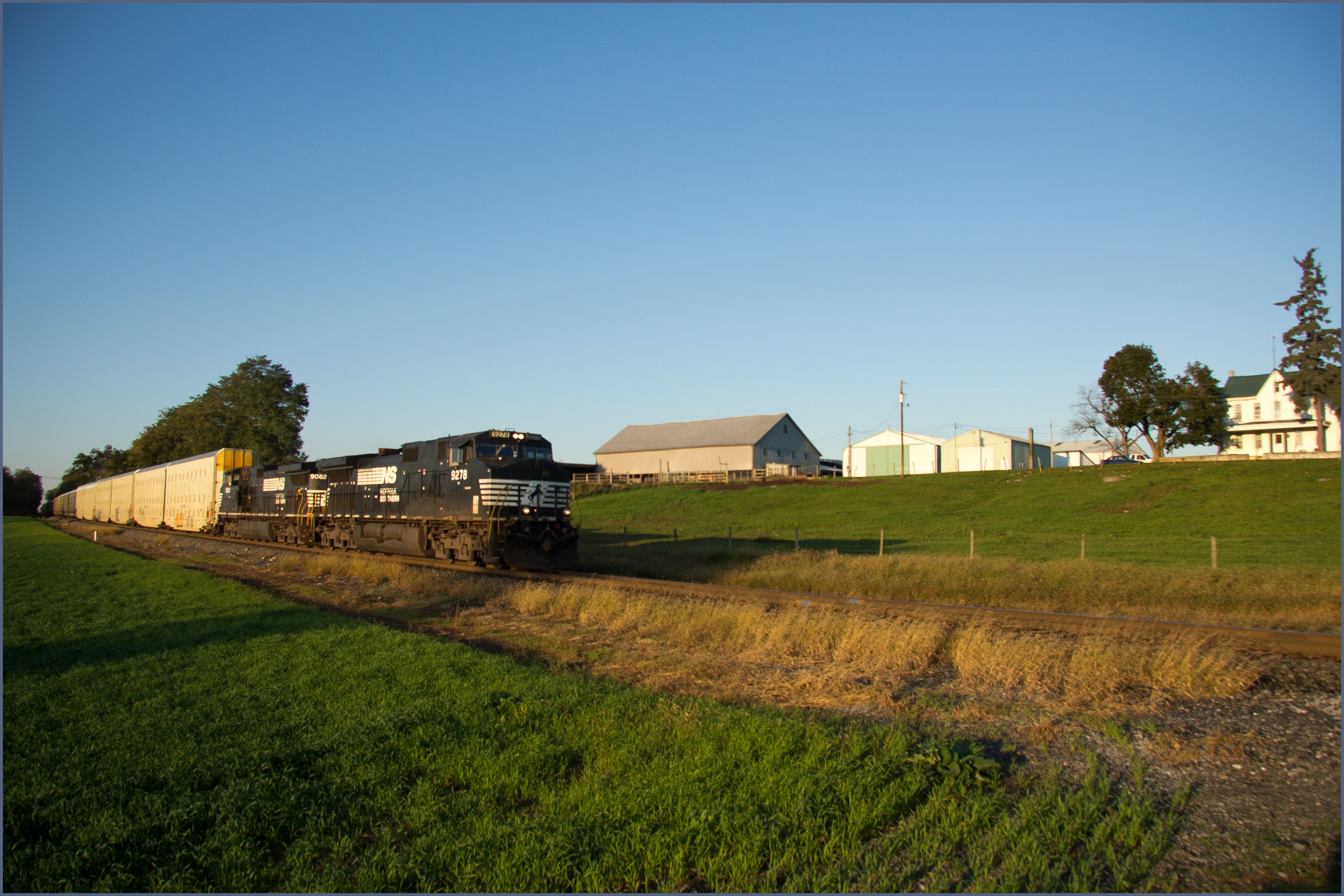
- Northbound Norfolk Southern autorack train on the Lurgan Branch south of Shippensburg

Overview
- Status: Operational
- Owner: Norfolk Southern
- Locale: central Pennsylvania and western Maryland
- Termini: Harrisburg, Pennsylvania; Hagerstown, Maryland

Service
- Type: Freight rail
- System: Norfolk Southern
- Operator(s): Norfolk Southern

Technical
- Number of tracks: 1-2
- Track gauge: 1,435 mm (4 ft 8 1/2 in) standard gauge

The Lurgan Branch is a railroad line owned and operated by the Norfolk Southern Railway (reporting mark NS) in the U.S. states of Pennsylvania and Maryland. The line is part of the NS Harrisburg Division and runs from Harrisburg, Pennsylvania southwest to Hagerstown, Maryland along former Reading Company (reporting mark RDG) and Pennsylvania Railroad (reporting mark PRR) lines. Its northeast end is at a junction with the Harrisburg Line, Pittsburgh Line, Royalton Branch, and Amtrak's Keystone Corridor (Philadelphia to Harrisburg Main Line); its southwest end is at the beginning of the Hagerstown District. At Lemoyne it intersects the Enola Branch.

== History ==
In 1837, the Cumberland Valley Railroad (reporting mark CVRR) opened the line from Lemoyne to Chambersburg, including the Lurgan Branch southwest of Shippensburg. The Franklin Railroad extended the line from Chambersburg to Greencastle in 1839 and Greencastle to Hagerstown in 1841. This part of the line became part of the Pennsylvania Railroad through leases and mergers.

The Harrisburg and Potomac Railroad was built in the 1870s from Lemoyne to Shippensburg. It was later linked to Harrisburg via the Philadelphia & Reading Railroad Bridge, and became part of the Reading Company via leases and mergers. At Lurgan tower, just southwest of Shippensburg, Reading ownership ended and the Western Maryland Railway Lurgan Subdivision began, continuing the rail connection to that railroad's Hagerstown classification yard. A connection was subsequently built in Shippensburg between the PRR line and the RDG line to allow for interchange coal traffic.

Conrail took over both companies in 1976. The PRR line was abandoned from Shippensburg to Carlisle, a portion that saw much street-running and -crossing, as this was the segment that was never significantly improved by the Cumberland Valley Railroad. The existing Cumbo connection was used to create the new hybrid line. The branch was assigned to Norfolk Southern in the 1999 breakup of Conrail. For similar reasons, the WM line south of Shippensburg, to Chambersburg, has been downgraded.

== Expansion plans ==
NS is preparing for expanded traffic on the Lurgan Branch as part of its Crescent Corridor project. A new intermodal terminal is planned for Greencastle, Pennsylvania and the existing terminal at Harrisburg will be upgraded. Work was scheduled to be completed by 2013.

== See also ==
- List of Norfolk Southern Railway lines
