= Fairview, Washington County, Maryland =

Unincorporated community in Maryland, United States

Fairview, Maryland
- Census-designated place
- Location within Maryland Location within the United States
- Coordinates: 39°42′40″N 77°50′26″W
- Country: United States
- State: Maryland
- County: Washington

Area
  - Total: 0.21 sq mi (0.54 km^{2})
  - Land: 0.21 sq mi (0.54 km^{2})
  - Water: 0 sq mi (0.00 km^{2})
- Elevation: 532 ft (162 m)

Population (2020)
  - Total: 76
  - Density: 361.3/sq mi (139.51/km^{2})
- Time zone: UTC-5 (Eastern (EST))
  - Summer (DST): UTC-4 (EDT)
- Area codes: 240 & 301
- FIPS code: 24-27500
- GNIS feature ID: 2583618

Fairview is an unincorporated community and census-designated place in Washington County, Maryland, United States. Its population was 76 as of the 2010 census.

== Geography ==
According to the U.S. Census Bureau, the community has an area of 0.211 square miles (0.55 km^{2}), all land.

== Demographics ==
Historical population
| Census | Pop. | Note | %± |
|---|---|---|---|
| 2020 | 76 | | — |
U.S. Decennial Census
