= Lurgan Subdivision =

Railway line in Pennsylvania, Maryland, and West Virginia

Overview
- Status: Active
- Owner: CSX Transportation
- Locale: Pennsylvania, Maryland, West Virginia
- Termini: Cherry Run; Chambersburg

Service
- Type: Freight rail
- System: CSX Transportation
- Operator(s): CSX

Technical
- Number of tracks: 1
- Track gauge: 4 ft 8 1/2 in (1,435 mm) standard gauge

The Lurgan Subdivision is a railroad line owned and operated by CSX Transportation in the U.S. states of Pennsylvania, Maryland, and West Virginia. The line runs from Chambersburg, Pennsylvania, south to Hagerstown, Maryland, and west to Cherry Run, West Virginia, along a former Western Maryland Railway (WM) line. It meets the Hanover Subdivision at Hagerstown and the Cumberland Subdivision at Cherry Run. The line is named after its former northern end in Lurgan Township, Franklin County, Pennsylvania, where the WM once connected to the Reading Company along the Alphabet Route.

== History ==
The Western Maryland Railway, which operated a main line from Baltimore to Williamsport, Maryland, made its initial expansion into Pennsylvania in 1881. The WM leased a line from the Baltimore and Cumberland Valley Rail Road and the Baltimore & Cumberland Valley Rail Road Extension Company, which connected Edgemont, Maryland, to Shippensburg, Pennsylvania. In 1886, the line was further connected in Shippensburg to the Harrisburg and Potomac Railroad, which later became part of the Reading system in 1891.

In 1899, the WM implemented a route modification between Chambersburg and Hagerstown known as the Altenwald Cutoff. This new route, connecting Hagerstown and Quinsonia, Pennsylvania, served to reduce steep grades for heavy coal trains and shorten the overall distance on the branch line. A portion of the cutoff was double-tracked, leading to improved operational efficiency. However, the remaining section between Quinsonia and Edgemont experienced lower traffic levels. Eventually, the segment between Waynesboro, Pennsylvania, and Edgemont was dismantled in the late 1950s.

During the late 1920s, the Reading Railroad constructed a new connection to the WM at Lurgan.

== See also ==
- List of CSX Transportation lines
- Lurgan Branch (Norfolk Southern Railway)
