= List of turnpikes in Maryland =

Historical turnpike roads in Maryland

Maryland’s first road statute, the 1666 Act for Making High Wayes, directed each county court to select, clear, and maintain “highways,” funding the work through compulsory labor or tobacco levies. The 1696 Act for the Better Clearing of the Roads reaffirmed those obligations but still provided no dedicated cash revenue. As overland commerce expanded after the Revolution, the General Assembly in 1787 authorized tolled, 66-foot-wide roads from Baltimore toward Frederick, Reisterstown (with branches to Westminster and Hanover), and York, prescribing surfacing standards and gate spacing while leaving construction to county commissioners. That hybrid public-oversight/toll-revenue model became the legal framework for the chartered turnpike companies listed below.

The Monocacy Road and Nemacolin's Path were Indigenous thoroughfares later adapted for colonial traffic. The Monocacy was widened for wagons by 1739. It linked the Potomac crossing at Conococheague Creek with Frederick, York, and Lancaster, demonstrating the commercial value of improved inland corridors.

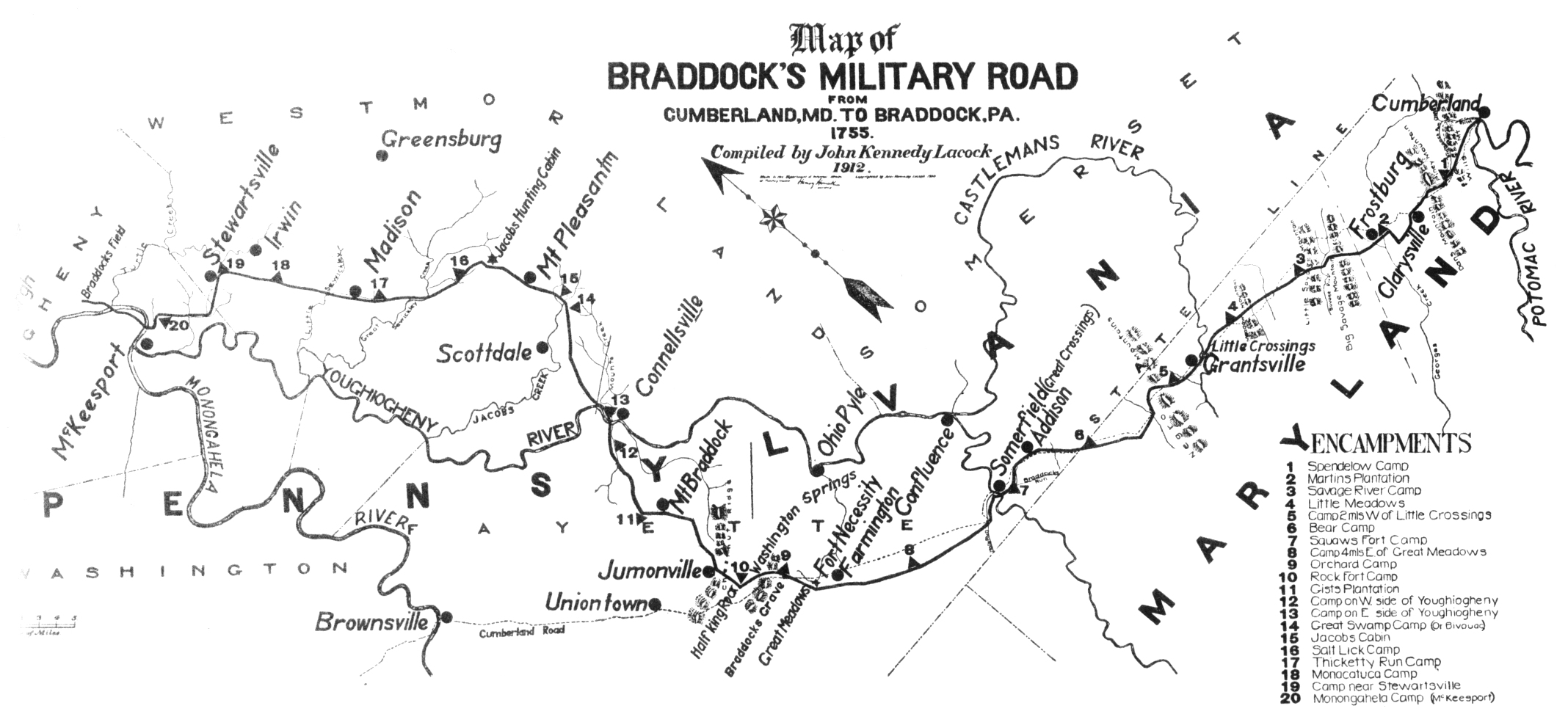
Lacock's map of the road

Military activity pushed construction westward when George Washington’s militia (1754) and General Edward Braddock’s expedition (1755) opened a graded track from Rock Creek to Wills Creek. Braddock's Road became the first engineered route across Maryland’s Allegheny Front and later guided both the Cumberland Turnpike and the federally funded National Road. When Congress revisited the alignment a half-century later, its commissioners debated “how best to engineer the route” across the same “irregular hills and hollows,” acknowledging that the terrain posed an “engineering challenge to road making.” Subsequent acts in 1796 and during the 1804–05 session incorporated more than forty turnpike trusts and joint-stock companies to rebuild the 1787 lines and extend new toll roads. However, one-third of the corporations chartered never built anything due to an inability to raise capital.

After a period of intensive chartering in the 1810s–1820s, Maryland's toll‑road network reached its zenith in the mid‑1820s. At this peak, seven principal macadam turnpikes radiated from Baltimore-Reisterstown, York, Falls, Frederick, Washington, Bel Air, and Havre‑de‑Grace, forming a spoke‑and‑hub network that funneled produce and passengers to the port city. Thereafter, most pikes functioned primarily as feeders to the expanding railways. A legislative tally in 1899 still recorded fifty-one chartered companies collecting tolls on about 497 miles (800 km) of road, roughly one‑quarter of the state's main‑road mileage, while many other pikes had already reverted to county supervision. Seeking to modernize the fragmented system, the General Assembly created the State Roads Commission in 1908; between 1909 and 1918 the commission purchased or condemned the surviving franchises, and by the early 1920s virtually every turnpike mile had been rebuilt as a free public highway.

The principal alignments, most prominently the Baltimore-Frederick corridor, remain embedded in today’s U.S. Route 40 and Maryland Route 144.

The sortable table below lists each company, its charter, and the present-day road occupying its corridor.

Name	Chartered	Routing	Approximate modern designation	Notes
National Turnpike		Cumberland - Frostburg - Grantsville - Pennsylvania (towards Uniontown)	U.S. Route 40	
Baltimore and Frederick-town Turnpike	January 12, 1805	Baltimore - Ellicott City - Mount Airy - New Market - Frederick - Middletown - Boonsboro	Route 144, U.S. Route 40 Alternate	
Baltimore and Reisterstown Turnpike	January 12, 1805	Baltimore - Reisterstown - Finksburg - Hampstead - Pennsylvania (Hanover and Maryland Line Turnpike); Reisterstown - Westminster - Pennsylvania (towards Littlestown); Finksburg - Gamber; Westminster - Uniontown	Route 140, Route 30; Route 140, Route 97; Route 91; Uniontown Road	
Baltimore and York-town Turnpike	January 12, 1805	Baltimore - Towson - Pennsylvania (towards York)	Route 45	
Falls Turnpike	January 19, 1805	Baltimore - Brooklandville	Cathedral Street, Route 25	
Washington Turnpike	January 25, 1806	District of Columbia (Washington Turnpike) - Rockville	Route 355	Was planned to Frederick via Clarksburg, but only built to Rockville
Hagerstown Turnpike	January 6, 1810	Westminster - Thurmont - Smithsburg - Hagerstown	Uniontown Road, Middleburg Road, Route 77, Route 64	
New-Castle and French-town Turnpike	January 6, 1810	Chesapeake Bay - Delaware (same name)	Lewis Shore Road, abandoned right-of-way	
Columbia Turnpike	January 6, 1810	Ellicott City - White Oak	U.S. Route 29	Not completed by the company; was to extend to District of Columbia, but only built to White Oak
Washington and Baltimore Turnpike	December 17, 1812	District of Columbia (Columbia Turnpike) - Laurel - Baltimore	U.S. Route 1 Alternate, U.S. Route 1, U.S. Route 1 Alternate	
Cumberland Turnpike	December 17, 1812	Conococheague - Hancock - Cumberland	U.S. Route 40, Route 144	
Elk and Christiana Turnpike	December 19, 1812	Elkton - Delaware (same name)	Route 281	
Baltimore and Havre-de-Grace Turnpike	January 29, 1814	Baltimore - Edgewood - Aberdeen - Havre de Grace	Route 7	
Westminster, Taney-Town and Emmittsburg Turnpike	January 31, 1814	Westminster - Taneytown - Emmitsburg - Pennsylvania (Waynesburg, Greencastle, and Mercersburg Turnpike)	Route 140	
Boonsboro and Sharpsburg Turnpike; Originally Boonsborough Turnpike	January 23, 1815	Boonsboro - Sharpsburg	Route 34	The chartered route extended to the Potomac River opposite Shepherdstown, West Virginia, but was never built
Baltimore and Harford Turnpike	January 3, 1816	Baltimore - Greenwood - Benson; Greenwood - Little Gunpowder Falls	Route 147; Long Green Pike	
Calverton Turnpike	January 16, 1816			
Hagers-Town and Conococheague Turnpike	January 27, 1817	Hagerstown - Conococheague	U.S. Route 40	
Hager's-Town and Boonsborough Turnpike	February 4, 1819	Boonsboro - Funkstown - Hagerstown	U.S. Route 40 Alternate	
Boonsborough Turnpike	January 30, 1822			
Franklin Turnpike	March 10, 1828	Baltimore - Franklintown	Franklintown Road	
Frederick and Woodsborough Turnpike	January 30, 1832	Frederick - Ceresville	Route 355, Route 26	Originally authorized to continue to Woodsboro, but that was built by the Woodsboro and Frederick Turnpike; Last turnpike in Maryland, bought by the State Roads Commission in 1921
Williamsport and Hagerstown Turnpike	March 2, 1833	Williamsport - Hagerstown	U.S. Route 11	
Northwestern Turnpike	March 22, 1833	Connecting the West Virginia turnpike of the same name across southern Allegany County	U.S. Route 50	
Cumberland and Somerset Turnpike	February 4, 1842	Locust Grove - Mount Savage - Pennsylvania (Somerset and Cumberland Turnpike)	Route 36, Route 47	
Maryland and New York Iron and Coal Company's turnpike	March 1, 1843	Mount Savage Iron Works - Mount Savage	Route 36	
Baltimore, Freedom and Liberty Turnpike; Originally Baltimore and Liberty Turnpike	February 24, 1844	Baltimore - Harrisonville	Route 26	
Frederick and Emmettsburg Turnpike	February 20, 1845	Frederick - Thurmont - Emmitsburg	U.S. Route 15	
Hagerstown and Waynesborough Turnpike	March 10, 1847	Hagerstown - Leitersburg - Pennsylvania (towards Waynesboro)	Route 60	
Marsh Turnpike	February 15, 1848	North of Hagerstown - Pennsylvania (towards Waynesboro)	Marsh Pike	
Hagerstown and Middleburg Turnpike	February 26, 1850	Hagerstown - Pennsylvania (Greencastle and Maryland Line Turnpike)	U.S. Route 11	
Union Turnpike; Originally Union Plank or Turnpike Road	February 27, 1850	District of Columbia (Washington and Rockville Turnpike) - Glenmont - Olney - Brookeville; Olney - Sandy Spring - Ashton; Sandy Spring — Glenmont	Route 97; Route 108; Route 182	
Westminster and Taneytown Turnpike	February 28, 1850	Westminster - Taneytown - Emmitsburg - Pennsylvania (Waynesburg, Greencastle, and Mercersburg Turnpike)	Route 140	Originally the Westminster, Taney-Town and Emmittsburg Turnpike
Williamsport and Greencastle Turnpike	March 6, 1850	Williamsport - Pennsylvania (towards Greencastle)	Route 63	
Bel-Air Turnpike	March 9, 1850	Benson - Bel Air	U.S. Route 1 Business	
Hagerstown and Sharpsburg Turnpike	April 14, 1853	Hagerstown - Sharpsburg	Route 65	
Hagerstown and Smithsburg Turnpike	May 23, 1853	Hagerstown - Smithsburg	Route 64	
Woodsboro and Frederick Turnpike	May 27, 1853	Woodsboro - Walkersville - Ceresville	Route 194	
Frederick and Monocacy Turnpike	May 27, 1853	Frederick - Monocacy River	Church Street, Gas House Pike	
Elkton, Andora and Lewisville Plank Road; Later Elkton, Andora and Lewisville Plank and Turnpike Road	May 27, 1853	Elkton - Cherry Hill - Pennsylvania (towards Lewisville)	Route 213	
Dulaney's Valley and Towsontown Turnpike	February 27, 1856	Loch Raven Reservoir - Towson	Route 146	
Green Spring Avenue	March 6, 1858	Baltimore - Route 130	Greenspring Avenue	
Baltimore and Jerusalem Turnpike; Originally Baltimore and Little Gunpowder Falls Turnpike	March 2, 1860	Baltimore - Jerusalem Mills	U.S. Route 1, Jerusalem Road	
Hagerstown and Cross-Roads Turnpike	March 7, 1860	Hagerstown - Cearfoss	Route 58	
Buckeystown Turnpike	March 9, 1860	Frederick - Buckeystown	Route 85	
Liberty and Frederick Turnpike	March 10, 1860	Libertytown - Ceresville	Route 26	
Frederick City and Catoctin Mountain Road	March 10, 1860	Frederick - Catoctin Mountain	Yellow Springs Road	
Liberty and New Windsor Turnpike	February 16, 1864	Libertytown - New Windsor	Route 31	
Dulaney's Valley and Sweet Air Turnpike	February 16, 1864	Loch Raven Reservoir - Knoebel	Dulaney Valley Road	
Meredith's Ford and Jarrettsville Turnpike	February 16, 1864	Loch Raven Reservoir - Taylor	Route 146	
Liberty and Pipe Creek Turnpike	March 10, 1864	Libertytown - Johnsville - Union Bridge	Route 75	
Western Run Turnpike	March 19, 1867	Cockeysville - Butler	Western Run Road	
Washington, Colesville and Ashton Turnpike	April 4, 1870	Silver Spring - Colesville - Ashton	U.S. Route 29, Route 650	
Mechanicsville and Finksburg Turnpike		Finksburg - Gamber	Route 91	Later merged into the Baltimore and Reister's-town Turnpike
Georgetown and Rockville Turnpike		Rockville - Washington, D.C.	Route 355	
Back River Neck Turnpike		Middle River - Essex; branch along Back River Neck	Route 150; Back River Neck Road	
Westminster and Meadow Branch Turnpike		Westminster - Frizzelburg	Route 140	Originally part of the Westminster, Taney-Town and Emmittsburg Turnpike
Adamstown Turnpike		Adamstown (Tuscarora Creek) to Route 85; branch to Doubs (Tuscarora Creek)	Mountville Road, New Design Road, Greenfield Road; Doubs Road	
Frederick and Ballinger Creek Turnpike		Frederick - Ballenger Creek	Route 351	
Frederick and Jefferson Turnpike		Frederick - Jefferson	Route 180	
Monocacy and Urbana Turnpike		Monocacy National Battlefield -	Route 355	
Woodsboro and Creagerstown Turnpike		Woodsboro - Creagerstown	Route 550	
Woodsboro and Double Pipe Creek Turnpike		Woodsboro - Detour	Route 194, Detour Road	
Frederick and Opossumtown Turnpike		Frederick - just north of Frederick Community College	Opossumtown Pike	
Frederick and Washington Turnpike		Frederick - Monocacy National Battlefield	Route 355	
Ellicott City and Clarksville Turnpike		Ellicott City - Clarksville	Route 108	
Triadelphia Turnpike		Glenelg - west of Ellicott City	Triadelphia Road	
Downsville and Hagerstown Turnpike		Downsville - Hagerstown	Route 632	
Gapland Turnpike		Gapland - Gathland State Park	Gapland Road	
Beaver Creek and South Mountain Turnpike		Funkstown - Greenbrier State Park	Beaver Creek Road	
Charles Street Avenue		Baltimore - Woodbrook	Charles Street	
Washington and Westminster Turnpike		Westminster - Smallwood	Route 32	
Washington Turnpike	December 31, 1796	District of Columbia - Baltimore	Unbuilt	
Elizabeth Turnpike	January 20, 1797	Baltimore - Frederick - Hagerstown - Williamsport	Unbuilt	
Reisterstown Turnpike	January 20, 1797	Reisterstown - Westminster - Taneytown - Emmitsburg - Pennsylvania	Unbuilt	
Cumberland and Union Turnpike	December 31, 1801	Cumberland - Pennsylvania (towards Uniontown)	Unbuilt	
Allegany Turnpike	December 31, 1801	West Virginia (towards Winchester) - Westernport - West Virginia (towards Morgantown)	Unbuilt	
Frederick-Town and Harper's Ferry Turnpike	December 12, 1812	Frederick - Harper's Ferry	Unbuilt	
Piscataway and Hynson Turnpike	January 2, 1814		Unbuilt	
Baltimore and Strasburg Turnpike	January 24, 1814	Pennsylvania (towards Holtwood) - Baltimore	Unbuilt	
Emmittsburg Turnpike	January 25, 1815	Point on the Hagerstown Turnpike - Emmitsburg	Unbuilt	
Susquehanna, Charles-Town and Elkton Turnpike	December 22, 1815	Perryville - Charlestown - Elkton	Unbuilt	
Westminster and New-Windsor Turnpike	January 6, 1816	New Windsor - Westminster	Unbuilt	
Westminster and Liberty Town Turnpike	January 15, 1816	Libertytown - Westminster	Unbuilt	
Baltimore, Liberty and Hager's Town Turnpike	January 17, 1816	Baltimore - Libertytown - Hagerstown	Unbuilt	
Washington and Frederick Turnpike	January 17, 1816	Middletown - Potomac River	Unbuilt	
Loveton Turnpike	January 22, 1816	Point on the Baltimore and York-town Turnpike - Pennsylvania (towards Holtwood)	Unbuilt	
Monocacy Turnpike	January 26, 1816	Dickerson - Poplar Springs	Unbuilt	
Harper's Ferry Turnpike	January 27, 1816	Frederick - Harpers Ferry	Unbuilt	
Baltimore and Rock Run Turnpike; Later Baltimore, Rock Run and Philadelphia Turnpike	January 29, 1816	Baltimore - Rock Run - Pennsylvania (towards New London); several branches to the south	Unbuilt	
William's-Port and Boonsborough Turnpike	January 22, 1817	Boonsboro - Williamsport	Unbuilt	
Elkton and Susquehanna Bridge Turnpike	February 3, 1817	Elkton - Rock Run	Unbuilt	
Potomac Turnpike	February 3, 1817	Oldtown - Cumberland	Unbuilt	
Conowingo Turnpike	February 4, 1817	Conowingo - Pennsylvania (towards New London)	Unbuilt	
Rock Run and Brick Meeting-House Turnpike	February 4, 1817	Port Deposit - Calvert - Delaware	Unbuilt	
Rockville and William's-Port Turnpike	February 3, 1818	Rockville - Crampton's Gap - Williamsport	Unbuilt	
Rockville and Washington Turnpike	February 3, 1818	Rockville - District of Columbia (Rockville and Washington Turnpike)	Unbuilt	
Williams-Port Turnpike	February 14, 1818	Boonsboro - Williamsport - point on the Cumberland Turnpike	Unbuilt	
Williams-Port and Cumberland Turnpike	January 11, 1819	Williamsport - Stone Quarry Ridge	Unbuilt	
Hager's-Town and Antietam Turnpike	February 2, 1819	Hagerstown - Pennsylvania (towards Gettysburg)	Unbuilt	
Hagers-town and Boonsborough Turnpike	February 4, 1819	Hagerstown - Funkstown - Boonsboro	Unbuilt	
Skipton Turnpike	January 22, 1820	Potomac River - Oldtown - Cumberland	Unbuilt	
Hancock Turnpike	February 24, 1823	Hancock - Pennsylvania (towards Bedford)	Unbuilt	
Hunting Ridge Turnpike	February 3, 1825		Unbuilt	
Frederick and Harper's Ferry Turnpike	February 4, 1825	Frederick - Harpers Ferry	Unbuilt	
Rockrun Turnpike	February 26, 1825	Point on the Baltimore and Havre-de-Grace Turnpike - Rock Run - Delaware (towards Stanton)	Unbuilt	
Susquehannah and Elkton Turnpike	March 3, 1826	Perryville - Elkton	Unbuilt	
Conewingo and Wilmington Turnpike	March 4, 1828	Conowingo - Delaware (towards Wilmington)	Unbuilt	
Port Deposit and Columbia Turnpike	March 7, 1828	Port Deposit - Pennsylvania	Unbuilt	
Port Deposit and Chesapeake Turnpike	March 15, 1828	Port Deposit - Chesapeake City	Unbuilt	
Frederick and Emmitsburg Turnpike	February 19, 1831	Frederick - Emmitsburg - Pennsylvania (towards Gettysburg)	Unbuilt	
Somerset and Cumberland Turnpike	March 4, 1833	Pennsylvania (Somerset and Cumberland Turnpike) - Cumberland	Unbuilt	
Clear Spring and Canal Turnpike	March 12, 1834	Clear Spring - Chesapeake and Ohio Canal	Unbuilt	
Frederick and Smithsburg Turnpike	March 13, 1834	Frederick - Smithsburg - Pennsylvania	Unbuilt	
Northern Turnpike	March 7, 1835	Westminster - Taneytown - Emmitsburg - Pennsylvania	Unbuilt	Originally part of the Westminster, Taney-Town and Emmittsburg Turnpike
Hagerstown and Waynesboro Turnpike	April 2, 1836	Hagerstown - Pennsylvania (towards Waynesboro)	Unbuilt	
Western Trade Turnpike	February 10, 1837	Point on the National Road west of Cumberland - point on the Northwestern Turnpike	Unbuilt	
Cumberland and Bedford Turnpike	March 9, 1837	Cumberland - Pennsylvania (towards Bedford)	Unbuilt	
George's Creek Mining Company's turnpike	January 20, 1838	Georges Creek - point on the National Road between Frostburg and Cumberland	Unbuilt	
North Branch and Cacapon Turnpike	March 27, 1839	West Virginia - Cumberland	Unbuilt	
Mercersville and Antietam Turnpike	April 3, 1839	Mercersville - Funkstown	Unbuilt	
Boonsboro and Ridgeville Turnpike	April 5, 1839	Boonsboro - Cavetown - Smithsburg - Blue Mountain - Pennsylvania	Unbuilt	
Jennings' Valley Rail Road and Turnpike	March 20, 1840	Frostburg - Locust Grove	Unbuilt	
Catoctin Valley Turnpike	February 27, 1841	Middletown - Chesapeake and Ohio Canal	Unbuilt	
Maryland and Virginia Turnpike	February 27, 1843	Point on the National Road west of Cumberland - point on the Northwestern Turnpike	Unbuilt	
Frostburg and the Valley of Jenning's Run Turnpike	March 3, 1843	Frostburg - Mount Savage Iron Works	Unbuilt	
Black Rock Turnpike	March 9, 1846		Unbuilt	
Woodsborough Turnpike	March 4, 1847	Ceresville - Woodsboro	Unbuilt	
Frederick and Smithsburg Road	March 2, 1848	Frederick - Leitersburg	Unbuilt	
Weaverton and Boonsborough Turnpike	March 2, 1848	Weverton - Boonsboro	Unbuilt	
Wills' Creek Turnpike	March 9, 1848	Corriganville - Pennsylvania	Unbuilt	
Mechanicstown, Harbaugh's Valley and Pennsylvania Line Turnpike	March 10, 1848	Thurmont - Sabillasville - Pennsylvania	Unbuilt	
Savage River Road	March 10, 1848	Allegany County	Unbuilt	
Old Road Turnpike	February 22, 1850	Baltimore - Ellicott City	Unbuilt	
Liberty and Franklin Plank or Turnpike Road; Later Gwinn's Falls Turnpike	February 27, 1850		Unbuilt	
Smithsburg and Beaver Creek Turnpike	March 6, 1850	Boonsboro - Smithsburg - Blue Mountain - Pennsylvania	Unbuilt	
Kellville and Joppa Cross Roads Turnpike	March 7, 1850	Southeast to Joppa	Unbuilt	
Doughoregan and Montgomery Plank or Turnpike Road	March 9, 1850	Point on the Baltimore and Frederick-town Turnpike - Glenelg - point on the Union Plank or Turnpike Road	Unbuilt	
Harford Turnpike	March 9, 1850	Conowingo - Bel Air	Unbuilt	
Bloomingdale Turnpike	May 15, 1852		Unbuilt	
Williamsport and Mercersburg Turnpike	May 26, 1852	Williamsport - Pennsylvania (towards Mercersburg)	Unbuilt	
Frankville Road	May 20, 1853	Frankville - Accident - west of Grantsville	Unbuilt	
Frostburg and Westernport Plank Road	May 24, 1853	Frostburg - Westernport	Unbuilt	
Bel-Air and Hickory Turnpike	May 26, 1853	Bel Air - Hickory	Unbuilt	
Fairview and Funkstown Turnpike	May 27, 1853	Northeast of Williamsport - Funkstown	Unbuilt	
Knoxville and Middletown Road	May 27, 1853	Knoxville - Middletown	Unbuilt	
Hillen Road	March 8, 1854	Baltimore - Towson	Unbuilt	
Hancock and Warfordsburg Turnpike or Plank Road	March 10, 1854	Pennsylvania - Hancock	Unbuilt	
Bel-Air and Lagrange Turnpike	March 10, 1854	Bel Air - Lagrange Iron Works	Unbuilt	
White Hall, Jarrettsville and La Grange Turnpike	March 10, 1854	White Hall - Jarrettsville - Lagrange Iron Works	Unbuilt	
Towsontown Plank Road	March 10, 1854	Baltimore - Towson	Unbuilt	
New Cut Turnpike	February 10, 1858		Unbuilt	
Bel Air and Frogtown Turnpike	March 6, 1858	Bel Air - Frogtown	Unbuilt	
Westernport and Frostburg Turnpike	February 24, 1860	Westernport - Frostburg	Unbuilt	
Western Avenue	February 25, 1860	Baltimore - Catonsville	Unbuilt	
Carrollton Avenue	February 29, 1860	Baltimore - Patapsco Falls	Unbuilt	
Libertytown and Ridgeville Turnpike	March 1, 1860	Libertytown - Unionville - Mount Airy	Unbuilt	
Uniontown Turnpike	March 2, 1860	Uniontown - "the completed terminus of the Westminster and Hagerstown Turnpike"	Unbuilt	
Rocks of Deer Creek Turnpike	March 2, 1860	Rocks of Deer Creek - Little Gunpowder Falls	Unbuilt	
Howard and Montgomery Turnpike	March 6, 1860	South of Ellicott City - Clarksville - Unity	Unbuilt	
Leitersburg and Ringold Turnpike	March 9, 1860	Leitersburg - Ringgold	Unbuilt	
Woodsborough and Pipe Creek Turnpike	January 25, 1864	Woodsboro - Middleburg - Union Bridge	Unbuilt	
Dulany's Valley and Little Falls Turnpike	March 10, 1864		Unbuilt	
Magnolia and Stockton Turnpike	March 10, 1864	Magnolia - Stockton	Unbuilt	
Monocacy and Montgomery Turnpike	March 23, 1865	Monocacy National Battlefield - Rockville	Unbuilt	
Union Bridge and Unionville Turnpike; Later Union Bridge Turnpike	February 7, 1866	Union Bridge - Unionville	Unbuilt, except for a short section at Union Bridge, sold to the Liberty and Pipe Creek Turnpike in 1872	
Crumpton and Long Marsh Turnpike	February 8, 1866	Crumpton - Long Marsh	Unbuilt	
Warren and My Lady's Manor Turnpike	February 8, 1866		Unbuilt	
Ellicott's Mills and Elysville Turnpike	March 5, 1867	Ellicott City - Elysville	Unbuilt	
Leitersburg and Smithsburg Turnpike	March 13, 1867	Leitersburg - Smithsburg	Unbuilt	
Western Run and Reisterstown Turnpike	February 18, 1868	Cockeysville - Reisterstown	Unbuilt	
Deer Park Turnpike	March 3, 1868		Unbuilt	
Monrovia and Libertytown Turnpike	March 3, 1868	Monrovia - Libertytown	Unbuilt	
Westminster and Oakland Turnpike	March 7, 1868	Westminster - Eldersburg	Unbuilt	
Wood Point and Broad Fording Turnpike	March 30, 1868	Wood Point - Pennsylvania	Unbuilt	
Prince George's County Central Turnpike	March 30, 1868	District of Columbia - Queen Anne	Unbuilt	
District of Columbia, Upper Marlboro and Hill's Landing Turnpike	April 4, 1870	District of Columbia - Forestville - Centreville - Upper Marlboro - Hill's Landing	Unbuilt	
Westminster and Bird Hill Turnpike	April 1, 1872	Westminster - Bird Hill	Unbuilt	
West Friendship and Linden Turnpike	April 11, 1874	West Friendship - Linden	Unbuilt	
Fallston Turnpike	April 11, 1874	White House - Fallston - Magnolia	Unbuilt	
Uniontown and Linwood Turnpike	April 8, 1876	Uniontown - Linwood	Unbuilt	
Unionville and Union Bridge Turnpike	March 20, 1878	Unionville - Union Bridge	Unbuilt	
Annapolis Road Turnpike	April 14, 1880	Baltimore - Annapolis	Unbuilt	
