= Williamsport Banking Mansion =

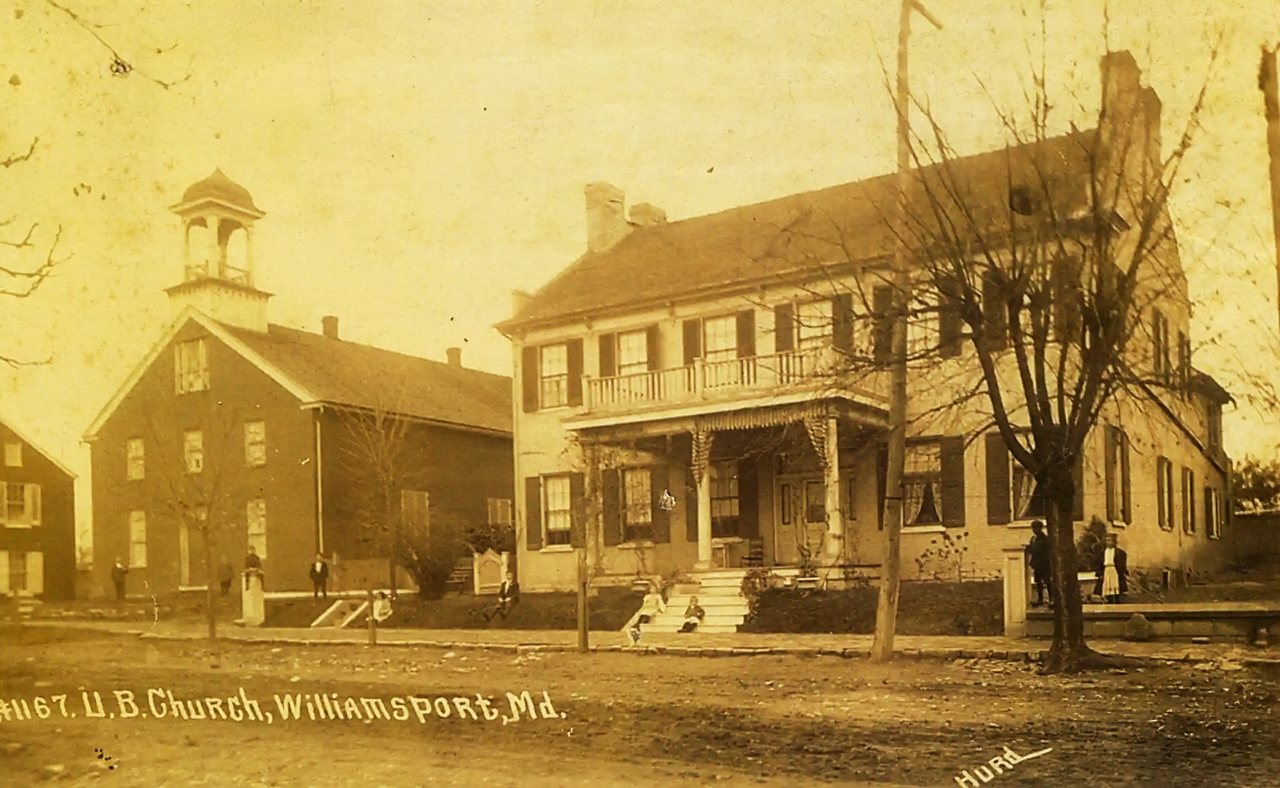
- Location: Williamsport, Maryland
- Built: 1814
- Architectural style: Federal
- Restored: 2022
- Added to NRHP: 2001

The Williamsport Banking Mansion, or Conococheague Banking House, is a historic private residence located in Williamsport, Maryland.

== Construction and uses ==
The mansion was built in 1814 as the Bank House for the Conococheague Bank, the second chartered bank in Washington County, MD after the Hagerstown Bank, and the 14th bank established within the State of Maryland. After the closing of the bank, the home was used for a variety of purposes, including the headquarters of the C&O Canal and a school before becoming a residence in 1846. During the Civil War, the house was used as a surgery and lodging for officers after the Retreat from Gettysburg in 1863 by the Confederate Army while they prepared to cross the Potomac River.

== Style and significance ==
The imposing structure was built in the Federal Style, with Flemish Bond brickwork, massive paired chimneys and parapets crowning the roofline. The home was added to the National Register of Historic Places as a contributing structure within the Williamsport Historic District in 2001.
