= Board of Engineers of the Baltimore and Ohio Railroad =

Engineering board of the early Baltimore and Ohio Railroad

The Board of Engineers of the Baltimore and Ohio Railroad was the principal engineering authority responsible for surveys, route selection, and engineering policy during the railroad's initial construction period between 1828 and 1830. It consisted principally of Stephen Harriman Long and Jonathan Knight, with the company's president, Philip E. Thomas, serving ex officio.

Rather than appointing a single chief engineer, the company adopted a board structure that divided responsibility between engineering policy and construction in the field. Surveying, route selection, and engineering decisions were assigned to the Board, while construction was carried out under a superintendent responsible for implementing Board-approved plans through contractors and field personnel. Calhoun identified this separation of authority as an important early experiment in railroad engineering governance.

The Board's organizational structure reflected broader governance traditions derived from canals, turnpikes, federal internal improvements, and Army engineering boards. Although the Board itself had been dissolved by 1830, the separation between engineering authority and construction supervision continued to shape the railroad's administration during the 1830s, particularly in works such as the Harpers Ferry crossing. Dilts linked difficulties associated with these projects to the later consolidation of engineering and construction responsibilities under Benjamin Henry Latrobe II in 1837.

== Background ==
Historian Daniel H. Calhoun described engineering governance in early nineteenth-century American internal improvements as the institutional framework through which technical decisions were authorized, reviewed, and executed. In Calhoun's account, this governance structure encompassed control over surveys and route location, approval of designs and specifications, awarding of contracts, supervision of construction, disbursement of funds, inspection of completed work, and the management of changes arising from field conditions. These functions were not consolidated into a single professional office but were distributed among engineers, administrators, commissioners, superintendents, contractors, and corporate directors, reflecting both the evolving state of engineering practice and the administrative traditions inherited from military and civil works.

Authority was therefore exercised through a combination of formal rules, institutional roles, and practical negotiation among participants rather than through a unified chain of command. This distributed structure shaped the organization of early infrastructure projects and complicated the coordination of surveying, design, contracting, and construction.

== Formation of the Board ==
When the Baltimore and Ohio Railroad began construction in 1828, the company faced the problem of organizing engineering authority for a form of infrastructure with few established American precedents. Although the board structure had antecedents in earlier federal and internal-improvement administration, historians have described its application to railroad construction as an effort to coordinate engineering planning with project execution through a formally organized engineering board.

Calhoun describes the arrangement as a compromise. The company had sought engineering expertise but avoided placing either Long or Knight clearly above the other. The result was a board structure in which surveying, route location, and engineering policy were assigned to the Board, while construction was assigned to a superintendent of construction responsible for carrying out Board-issued plans.

This structure reflected both federal engineering-board practice and earlier internal-improvement administration. It also introduced ambiguities from the beginning, since the Board controlled plans and engineering policy while construction authority was exercised through superintendents, contractors, and field personnel.

== Governance models ==
During the early nineteenth century, large-scale infrastructure projects in the United States developed distinct governance models to coordinate engineering oversight, financial control, and construction. In each case, governance operated not solely through formal hierarchy but through the interaction of engineers, administrators, contractors, and corporate directors whose responsibilities frequently overlapped in practice. These models varied by institutional setting—state, corporate, or federal—but all faced a common challenge: reconciling surveyed design with the realities of construction practice.

=== Private and state-chartered works ===
Private and state-chartered enterprises, including canals, turnpikes, and early railroads, generally organized engineering and construction oversight through combinations of directors, commissioners, engineers, superintendents, and contractors rather than through unified professional hierarchies. Although many projects employed chief engineers or surveyors, operational responsibility was often shared among corporate boards, field supervisors, and contractors responsible for carrying out the work.

Canal projects demonstrated increasingly formalized engineering organization. The Erie Canal operated under a board of canal commissioners with engineering work carried out under principal engineers including Benjamin Wright, who supervised surveys, alignments, and engineering specifications while construction proceeded through numerous independent contracts. Engineers exercised growing authority over engineering matters, but directors and commissioners retained substantial influence over expenditures, standards, and execution.

A similar pattern appeared on the Chesapeake and Ohio Canal. Initial surveys were conducted under the authority of the General Survey Act of 1824 with assistance from Army engineers associated with the Board of Engineers for Internal Improvements. Under corporate administration, construction proceeded through multiple contractors while engineers adapted designs to geological and hydraulic conditions along the Potomac River. Calhoun identified recurring tensions between engineers and directors over canal dimensions and construction standards. In contrast to earlier projects such as the Union Canal, where chief engineer Loammi Baldwin Jr. resigned amid disputes with directors over canal dimensions, the Chesapeake and Ohio Canal more often sustained engineering recommendations, reflecting the increasing influence of civil engineers within corporate governance.

The Morris Canal exhibited similar tensions between engineering planning, financial constraints, and practical construction management. Its difficult topography and reliance on inclined-plane technology required extensive coordination between engineers, directors, superintendents, and contractors while exposing recurring disputes over costs, water supply, and construction methods.

Turnpike companies represented an earlier and less professionalized form of infrastructure governance. Companies such as the Baltimore and Reisterstown Turnpike were governed principally through boards of directors and commissioners, with surveying often performed by locally engaged surveyors and construction carried out through small contracts or direct labor. Engineering responsibilities remained diffuse and closely tied to financial and local considerations. A small number of formally trained engineers, including William Weston on the Philadelphia and Lancaster Turnpike, participated in turnpike development, but such cases remained exceptional.

Early railroads adopted related but increasingly centralized organizational forms. Companies such as the South Carolina Canal and Rail Road Company and the Boston and Lowell Railroad employed chief engineers responsible for surveys, alignment, and construction supervision while continuing to rely on contractors for grading, masonry, and trackwork. These projects increasingly concentrated supervision within centralized engineering departments while preserving contract-based systems of construction.

Calhoun described these enterprises as demonstrating the expanding role of civil engineers in infrastructure planning, standards, and design alongside continuing involvement by directors, contractors, and construction supervisors in project administration.

=== Federal works ===
Federal internal improvements developed under different administrative constraints and adopted administrative arrangements that combined engineering oversight with fiscal and executive control. In contrast to private and state-chartered works, where authority often remained dispersed through contractual relationships, federal projects placed greater emphasis on centralized review and formal administrative supervision even where construction itself remained decentralized.

The National Road represented an early federal model in which engineering governance was embedded within the administrative structure of the United States Department of the Treasury. Treasury officials oversaw contract letting, payments, and reporting, while engineers provided surveys and engineering guidance. Construction proceeded through sectional contracts supervised by agents responsible for enforcing specifications and certifying completed work. Engineering decision-making, however, remained only partially centralized. President Thomas Jefferson and Secretary of the Treasury Albert Gallatin corresponded directly with engineers such as David Shriver Jr. on matters including the design of the Casselman River bridge, illustrating the absence of a clearly defined professional hierarchy. As construction expanded westward, administration became increasingly cumbersome, and greater reliance was placed on Army engineers for surveys and engineering supervision during the 1820s.

A more formalized model emerged through the United States Army Corps of Engineers. The Board of Engineers for Fortifications, established in 1816, introduced a system of collective engineering review in which senior engineers evaluated designs, promoted standardization, and advised on the construction of coastal defenses. Historians of American engineering administration have described this approach as placing engineering review, design evaluation, and engineering decision-making under centralized supervision in contrast to the more dispersed administrative practices common in private enterprises.

The General Survey Act of 1824 extended this model into civilian infrastructure by authorizing Army engineers to survey roads, canals, and other works of national importance. Under the Board of Engineers for Internal Improvements, Army officers prepared surveys, estimates, and engineering evaluations for projects including the Chesapeake and Ohio Canal, the National Road, and early railroad surveys. Drawing heavily on officers trained at the United States Military Academy, the board introduced a system of engineering review in which Army engineers prepared surveys, estimates, and engineering evaluations while construction, contracting, and funding generally remained under separate state or corporate authority, preserving important divisions between planning and execution.

These federal systems established increasingly formal methods for organizing engineering review and infrastructure administration while still preserving divisions between engineering evaluation, contracting, and project execution. The Baltimore and Ohio Railroad's Board of Engineers emerged within this broader institutional context, combining elements of federal engineer-board practice with the contractual and corporate structures characteristic of private transportation enterprises.

== Baltimore and Ohio Board of Engineers ==
These private and federal systems of internal improvement formed the institutional context for the Baltimore and Ohio Railroad’s approach to engineering governance. Rather than appointing a single chief engineer, the company organized engineering supervision through a board that divided responsibility between engineering policy and construction.

The Board incorporated forms of collective engineering review associated with federal engineering boards together with commissioner–superintendent practices characteristic of internal-improvement projects such as the National Road and Maryland turnpikes including the Baltimore and Reisterstown Turnpike. Surveying and engineering policy were assigned to the Board, while construction was carried out under a superintendent responsible for implementing Board-issued plans through contractors and field personnel.

Personnel and construction practices associated with the railroad's early works also reflected experience gained on earlier internal-improvement projects. Several contractors, builders, and assistants associated with the railroad's early works—including contractor Charles Wilson, superintendent Isaac McCartney, bridge builder Lewis Wernwag, and engineer James Lloyd—had prior experience on the National Road and related internal-improvement projects.

The resulting system combined formal engineering review with contract-based construction management. Under this arrangement, engineering policy and route selection remained under the authority of the Board, while field execution depended on superintendents and contractors responsible for carrying out Board-approved plans.

=== Organizational structure and engineering practice ===
Under the Board's system, engineering responsibilities were divided between two distinct groups. Surveying, route location, and design were carried out by topographical engineers and assistants under the Board's direction. Construction was assigned to a superintendent of construction, who received plans and instructions from the Board and was responsible for their implementation in the field.

In practice, this arrangement created a structural division between design authority and construction. The superintendent managed contractors, materials, and day-to-day field operations but was required to follow Board-issued plans. Changes to alignments or construction methods required review by the Board, even when prompted by field conditions.

The Board directed early surveys and route selection for the Baltimore and Ohio Railroad, including alignment decisions across challenging terrain west of Baltimore. Surveyors and engineers were required to balance grades, curvature, excavation limits, drainage, and construction practicality within the constraints of contemporary surveying methods.

Field implementation, however, often required modification of surveyed alignments. Conditions encountered during construction—including excavation limits, drainage, and material stability—led to adjustments that exposed tensions between design assumptions and constructability. These issues were evident in works such as the approaches to Parr's Ridge, the Deep Cut, and the Harpers Ferry crossing, where construction difficulties prompted revisions to earlier plans.

This arrangement is reflected in the work of superintendent of construction Caspar W. Wever, whose responsibilities included contractor coordination, material procurement, and implementation of Board-approved alignments and construction plans in the field. Although the Board established engineering policy and approved designs, practical execution depended on the superintendent adapting those plans to field conditions through contractors. Wever's experience indicates how difficult it could be to maintain a strict separation between engineering planning and construction management during large-scale railroad works.

=== Conflict and limitations ===
Several aspects of the Board's structure generated conflict and administrative ambiguity. The equal authority of Long and Knight provided no automatic mechanism for resolving disagreements between them, while the presence of the company's president on both the Board of Engineers and the board of directors blurred distinctions between engineering and managerial authority.

The position of superintendent of construction became a particular point of tension. Caspar W. Wever, appointed to that role, sought greater autonomy over construction decisions, including authority to adjust routes and control contracts. Under the Board structure, however, such requests required review by the engineers themselves, reinforcing the separation between engineering design authority and field execution.

Dilts identified these overlapping responsibilities and divided lines of authority as contributing to delays, cost overruns, and revisions during the railroad's early construction period.

=== Comparative assessment ===
Historians including Daniel H. Calhoun have described the Baltimore and Ohio Railroad's Board of Engineers as combining practices associated with earlier internal-improvement administration with forms of centralized engineering supervision that later became more common on American railroads. Its structure reflected both military engineering traditions and the contractual construction practices inherited from canals, turnpikes, and the National Road. Although the system strengthened engineering review and route planning, it also exposed the practical difficulties of separating engineering policy from construction management during large-scale railroad construction.

=== Legacy ===
The Board of Engineers established the initial engineering framework for the Baltimore and Ohio Railroad, including its surveying practices and route selection methods. Historians including Daniel H. Calhoun have argued that the Board's separation of engineering authority from construction management revealed the difficulties of coordinating design and construction in large infrastructure projects and contributed to the later development of more integrated forms of railroad engineering administration.

Major works such as the Harpers Ferry crossing generated disputes over construction quality, contractor performance, and engineering responsibility within the Board system. Problems associated with the bridge foundations, subsequent investigations into contractor Charles Wilson's masonry work, and later interventions by Benjamin Henry Latrobe II generated disputes over responsibility between the Board, the superintendent of construction, and contractors in the field. Although the Board itself had been dissolved by 1830, the divided structure of engineering and construction authority persisted under evolving administrative arrangements during the 1830s and formed part of the broader circumstances surrounding Caspar W. Wever's resignation in 1836. By 1837, the appointment of Latrobe as chief engineer consolidated engineering policy and construction supervision under a single officer with broader authority over both design and execution.
