= Daniel Donnelly House =

Historic house in Maryland, United States

- U.S. National Register of Historic Places
- Location within Maryland Location within the United States
- Location: 14906 Falling Waters Road, Williamsport, Maryland
- Coordinates: 39°33′11.6″N 77°51′14.2″W
- Area: 16 acres (6.5 ha)
- Built: 1833
- Architectural style: Federal
- NRHP reference No.: 03001333
- Added to NRHP: December 24, 2003

The Daniel Donnelly House is a historic home in Williamsport, Maryland, United States. It is a Flemish bond brick, two-story dwelling on a prominent hill built about 1833. The house shows influence of the Federal and Greek Revival styles. Also on the property are a small garden house, shed, and summerhouse, all small late-20th-century structures. The house is associated with the American Civil War Battle of Falling Waters, which took place July 13 and 14, 1863. The Civil War Sites Advisory Commission found the property to be the best preserved battlefield along the route of Robert E. Lee's retreat from Gettysburg.

The Daniel Donnelly House was listed on the National Register of Historic Places in 2003.
