= Funkstown Historic District =

Historic district in Maryland, United States

- U.S. National Register of Historic Places
- U.S. Historic district
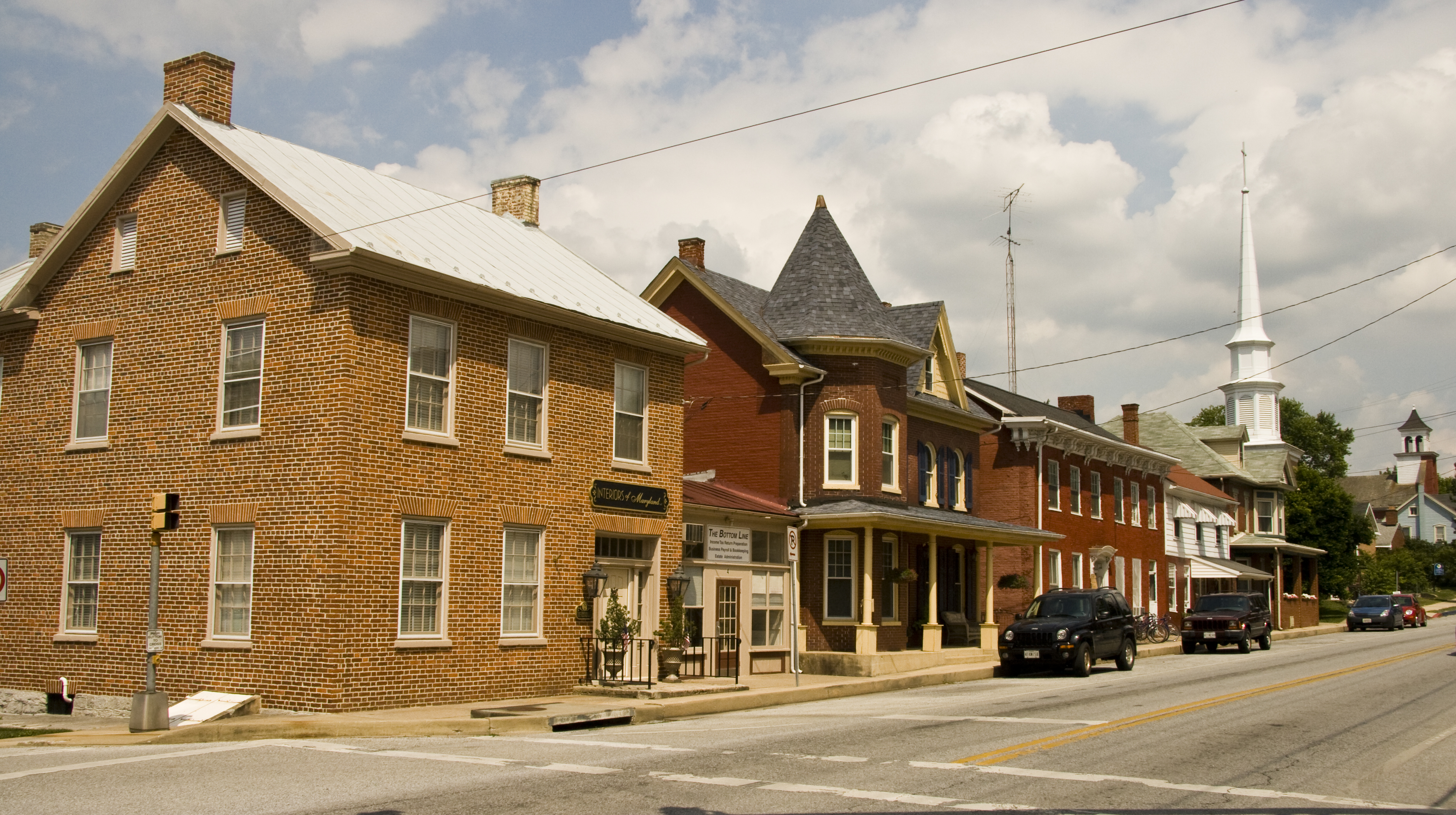

- Location within Maryland Location within the United States
- Location: Roughly bounded by Antietam Creek, US 40A, Stouffer Ave., and High St., Funkstown, Maryland
- Coordinates: 39°36′30″N 77°42′36″W
- Area: 100 acres (40 ha)
- Built: 1863
- Architectural style: Federal, Greek Revival, et al.
- NRHP reference No.: 00001050
- Added to NRHP: September 8, 2000

Funkstown Historic District is a national historic district at Funkstown, Washington County, Maryland, United States. The district includes 217 contributing buildings, one contributing structure, and three contributing sites. The National Road forms Funkstown's main street and shaped in a significant way the appearance of the town. Funkstown's early and most extensive development was along this route, including the town's oldest known dwelling, the Jacob Funk House, built by the founder in 1769. Other properties are of sided log, stone, or brick construction of mixed residential and commercial use, dating from the late 18th century through the mid 20th century.

It was added to the National Register of Historic Places in 2000.
