= Cedar Grove (Williamsport, Maryland) =

Historic house in Maryland, United States

- U.S. National Register of Historic Places
- Location within Maryland Location within the United States
- Location: 15435 Dellinger Rd. Williamsport, Maryland
- Coordinates: 39.5367°N 77.8346°W
- Area: 9 acres (3.6 ha)
- Built: 1760
- Architectural style: Federal
- NRHP reference No.: 99000984
- Added to NRHP: August 27, 1999

Cedar Grove is a historic home located at Williamsport in Washington County, Maryland, United States. It is a two-story, four-bay brick-cased log dwelling with a central chimney built of stone and brick. The original part of the house was built about 1760, with later Federal-style additions. The house is likely one of the early tenement houses on Lord Baltimore's Conococheague Manor.

It was listed on the National Register of Historic Places in 1999.
