= Tammany (Williamsport, Maryland) =

Historic house in Maryland, United States

- U.S. National Register of Historic Places
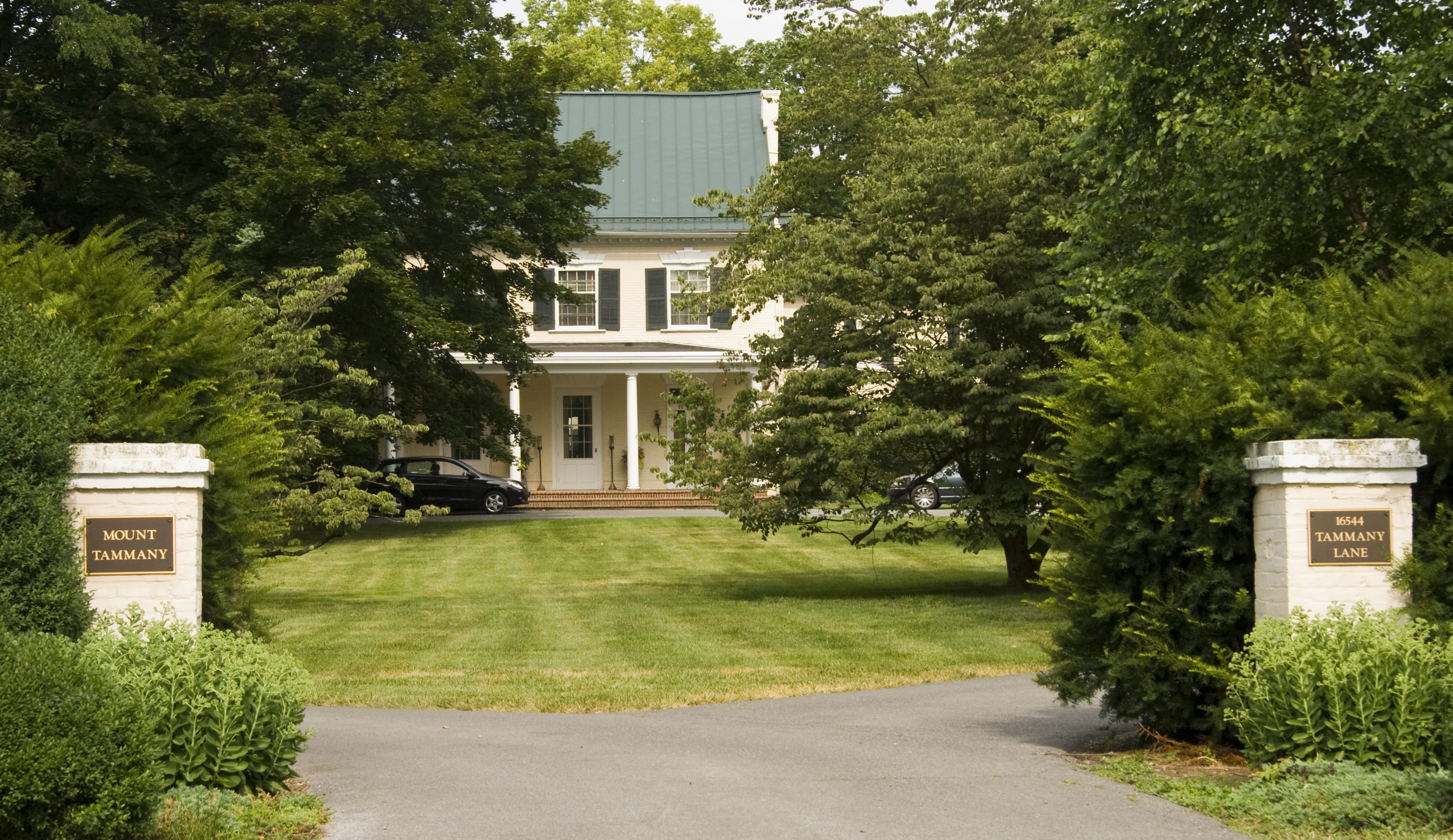

- Location within Maryland Location within the United States
- Location: Northeast of Williamsport off U.S. Route 11, Williamsport, Maryland
- Coordinates: 39°36′39″N 77°47′44″W
- Area: 2.6 acres (1.1 ha)
- Built: 1785
- Architectural style: Georgian
- NRHP reference No.: 79003262
- Added to NRHP: September 24, 1979

Tammany, or Mount Tammany, is a historic home located at Williamsport, Washington County, Maryland, United States. It is a two-part brick structure resting on low fieldstone foundations. The main block is a two-story, three-bay structure with a side hall entrance. Attached to its north gable wall is a two-story five-bay structure also of brick. The house features a one-story porch with a low-hipped roof, supported by round Doric columns. It is believed to have been built in the 1780s by Matthew Van Lear, a prominent early resident of Washington County.

It was listed on the National Register of Historic Places in 1979.
