= Williamsport Historic District =

Historic district in Maryland, United States

- U.S. National Register of Historic Places
- U.S. Historic district
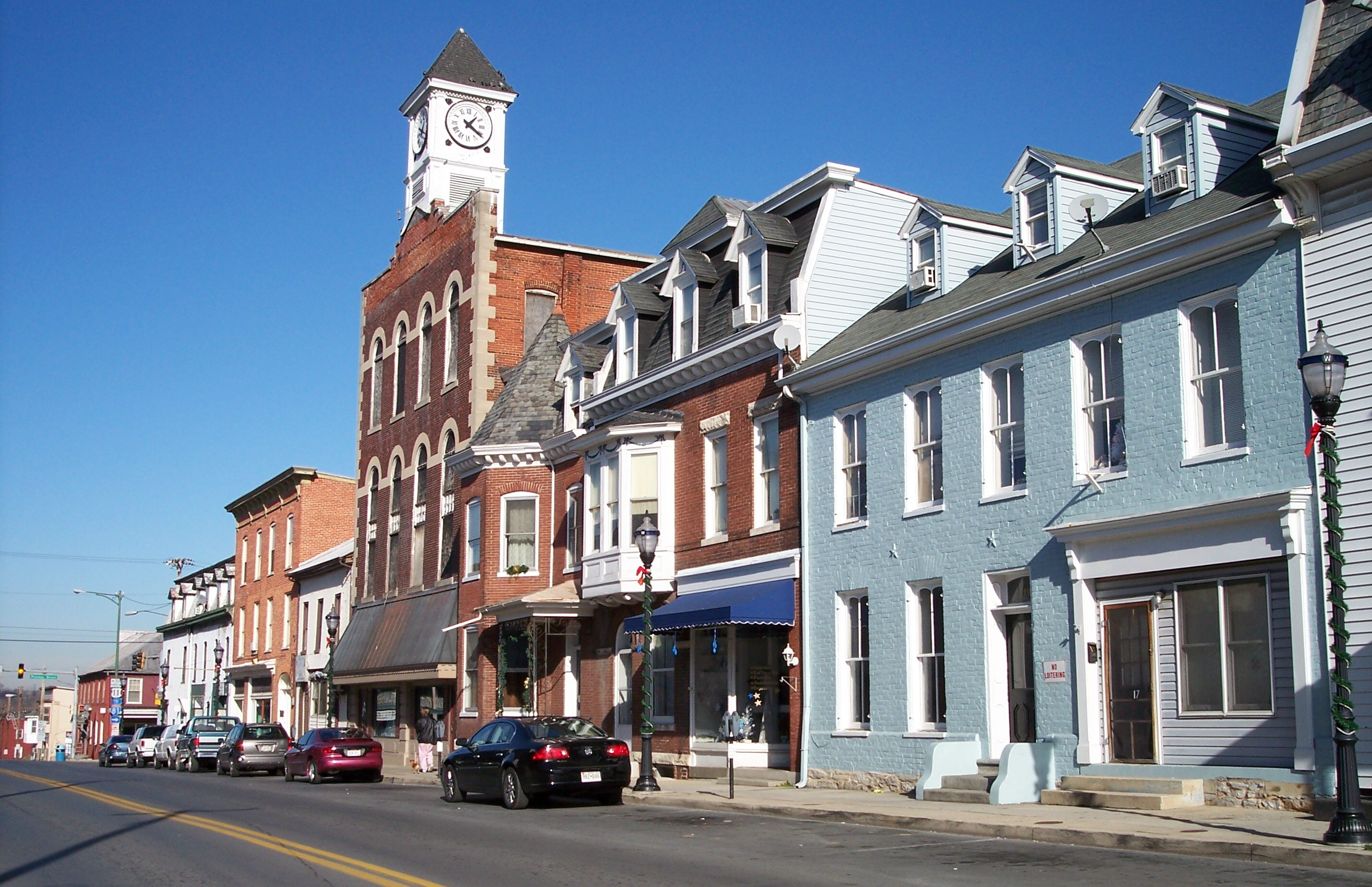
- View north on Conococheague Street, January 2007

- Location within Maryland Location within the United States
- Location: Roughly bounded by C and O Canal, Conococheague Cr., Springfield Ln., and W. Frederick St., Williamsport, Maryland
- Coordinates: 39°35′58″N 77°49′15″W
- Area: 183 acres (74 ha)
- Built: 1786
- Architectural style: Greek Revival, Italianate, et al.
- NRHP reference No.: 01001184
- Added to NRHP: October 26, 2001

Williamsport Historic District is a national historic district in Williamsport, Washington County, Maryland, United States. The district consists of the historic core of this town. Nearly 20 percent of the buildings in the district date from the late 18th and early 19th centuries. They are generally of log or brick construction until the second quarter of the 19th century. The district includes one of fewer than 10 banking houses still remaining in the US that were constructed during the era of the first National Bank, the Williamsport Banking Mansion, circa 1814. The town grew with the Chesapeake and Ohio Canal and railroads, which resulted in prominent late-19th-century Italianate and Queen Anne style buildings for residential and commercial purposes. Slightly less than 60 percent of the buildings date from the late 19th and early 20th centuries.

It was added to the National Register of Historic Places in 2001.
