= Sprechers Mill House =

Historic house in Maryland, United States

- U.S. National Register of Historic Places
- Location within Maryland Location within the United States
- Location: Northeast of Williamsport on Hopewell Rd., Williamsport, Maryland
- Coordinates: 39°37′2″N 77°47′40″W
- Area: 13.8 acres (5.6 ha)
- Built: 1833
- NRHP reference No.: 78001487
- Added to NRHP: January 5, 1978

The Sprechers Mill House, also known as Salisbury, is a historic home located at Williamsport, Washington County, Maryland, United States. It is a two-story, three-bay brick structure set on low fieldstone foundations, with a one-story, two-bay brick wing also of brick construction. The home features an elaborate main entrance.

The Sprechers Mill House was listed on the National Register of Historic Places in 1978.
