= Rose Hill (Williamsport, Maryland) =

Historic house in Maryland, United States

- U.S. National Register of Historic Places
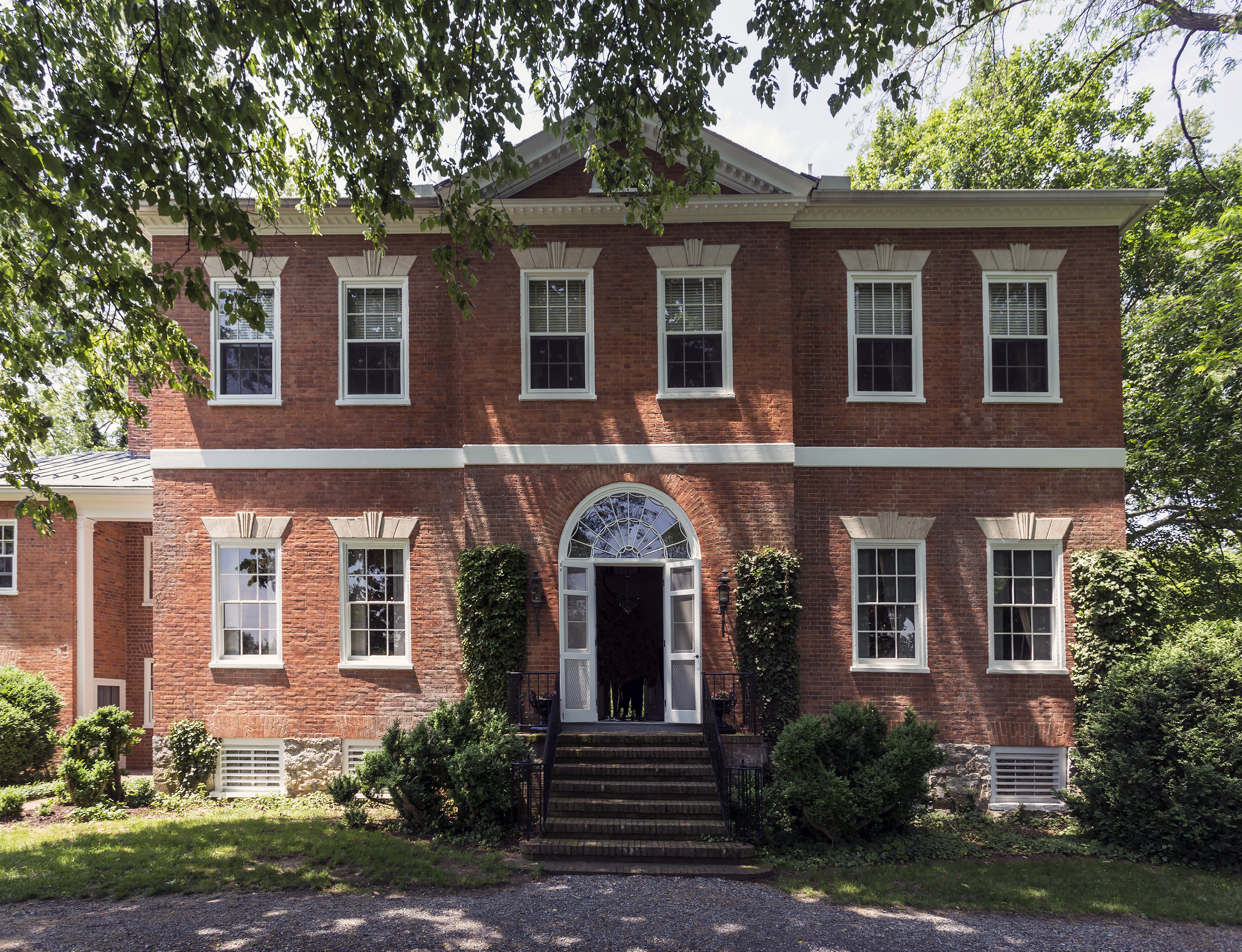

- Location within Maryland Location within the United States
- Location: 0.5 miles (0.80 km) south of Williamsport on Maryland Route 63, Williamsport, Maryland
- Coordinates: 39°34′41″N 77°49′8″W
- Area: 116.6 acres (47.2 ha)
- Built: 1802
- Architectural style: Federal
- NRHP reference No.: 73000942
- Added to NRHP: April 11, 1973

Rose Hill, also known as Rose Hill Manor, is a historic home located near Williamsport, Washington County, Maryland, United States. It was built about 1802 and is a six-bay, two-story Flemish bond brick house with a hip roof and a "widow's walk." The interior details reflect the taste of the Adamesque Federal period.

Rose Hill was listed on the National Register of Historic Places in 1973.
