= Poplar Springs, Maryland =

Unincorporated community in Maryland, United States

- Location within Maryland Location within the United States
- Coordinates: 39°20′36″N 77°05′47″W
- Country: United States of America
- State: Maryland
- County: Howard

Population (1888)
  - Total: 48
- Time zone: UTC-5 (Eastern (EST))
  - Summer (DST): UTC-4 (EDT)

Poplar Springs is a town located in western Howard County in the state of Maryland, United States.

The town is named for the "Poplar Spring Branch", where Levin Lawrance settled in 1741 and Captain Philimon Dorsey settled in 1750 on a land patent named "Dorseys Grove".

Old Frederick Road was built through the town, following a Native American foot trail. By 1783, two weekly stagecoaches traveled the road. As of 1835, eight daily coaches traveled through town. In the summer of 1843 and 1844, Samuel Morse used Poplar Springs as a vacation spot while experimenting with the single wire telegraph.

After the Civil War, members of the 1st Maryland Infantry, CSA would hold regular reunions at the hotel in town. By 1888, the town population was 48.
