= Maryland Inventory of Historic Properties =

The Maryland Inventory of Historic Properties (MIHP) is a database of historical and architectural properties in the U.S. state of Maryland. It is maintained by the Maryland Historical Trust (MHT), which serves as the state's historic preservation office. The inventory is a primary resource for researchers, preservationists, and government agencies for state and local planning regarding historic sites.

== About ==
The inventory includes documentation on thousands of resources, including buildings, structures, archaeological sites, and historic districts across Maryland's counties and Baltimore City. Each property is assigned a unique MIHP number, such as "B-87" for the Sellers Mansion in Baltimore.

The documentation for each site is typically compiled in an "Architectural Survey File" or "Archaeological Survey File" which may contain photographs, maps, architectural descriptions, and historical summaries. These files often incorporate documents from other agencies, such as National Register of Historic Places registration forms.

== Access ==
Public access to the Maryland Inventory of Historic Properties is provided through the Medusa system, which is managed by the Maryland Historical Trust. Medusa serves as the state's digital archive for cultural resource information, allowing the public to search for and retrieve digitized documents from the inventory. These documents are typically available as downloadable PDF files, directly accessible through URLs structured by county and the property's unique MIHP number.

== Administration ==
The MIHP is administered by the Maryland Historical Trust, which is an agency within the Maryland Department of Planning. As the State Historic Preservation Office (SHPO) for Maryland, the MHT uses the inventory to fulfill its responsibilities under state and federal preservation laws.

== See also ==
- Maryland Historical Trust
- National Register of Historic Places listings in Maryland
- Historic preservation
