= Ceresville, Maryland =

Unincorporated community in Maryland, United States

- Location within Maryland Location within the United States
- Coordinates: 39°27′13″N 77°22′00″W
- Country: United States
- State: Maryland
- County: Frederick

Ceresville is an unincorporated community in Frederick County, Maryland.

== History ==
In July 1793, Continental Army officer Otho H. Williams sent a letter to then U.S. secretary of the treasury Alexander Hamilton from Ceresville, recommending a successor to the position of Collector of Annapolis. In August 1933, a tornado touched down causing extensive property damage and heavy rains caused the nearby Monocacy River to rise eight feet, resulting in flood damage as well.
