= Funkstown, Maryland =

- Town
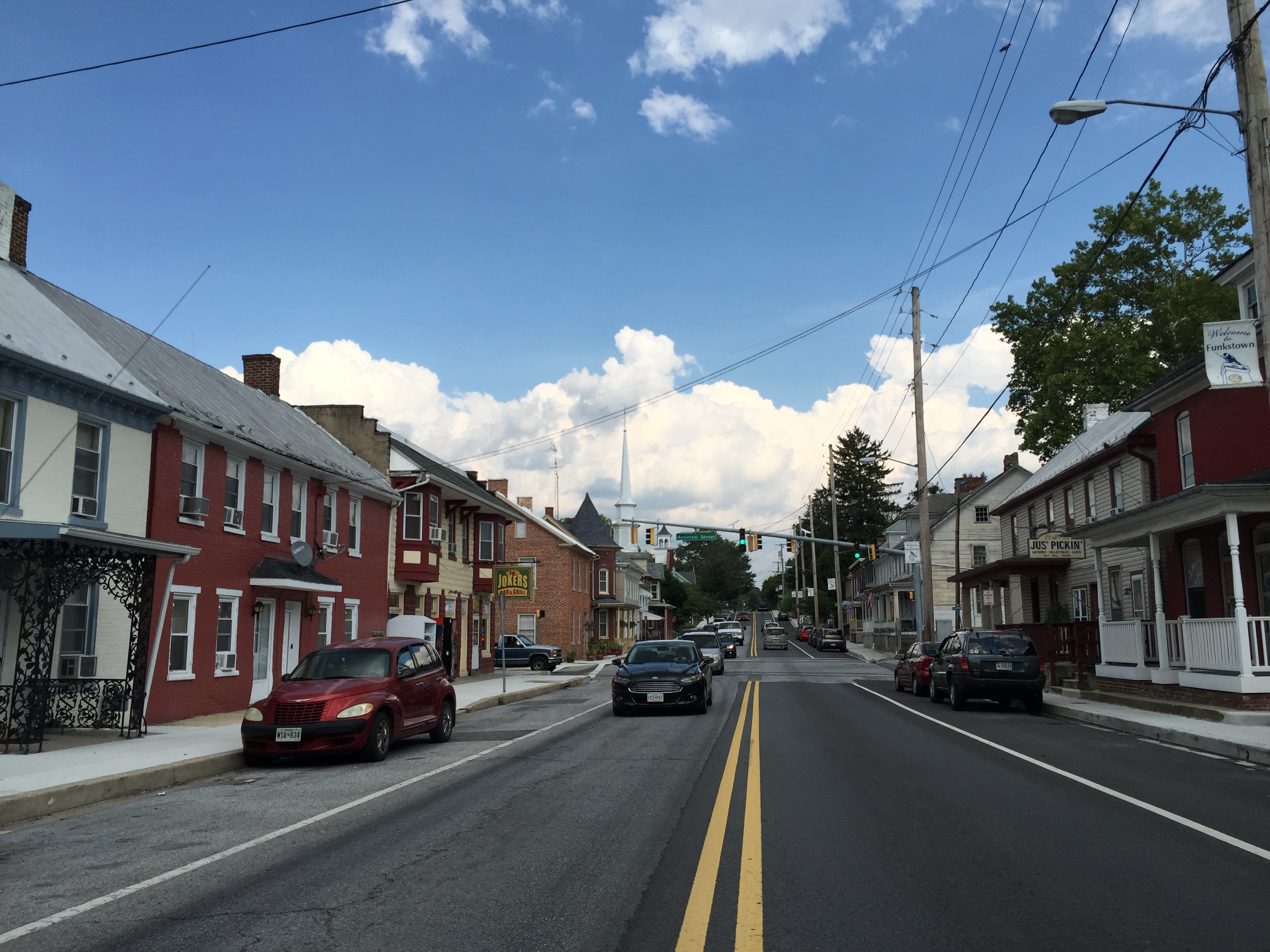
- View east along U.S. Route 40 Alternate (Baltimore Street) between Westside Avenue and Antietam Street

- Seal

- Location of Funkstown, Maryland
- Coordinates: 39°36′33″N 77°42′27″W
- Country: United States
- State: Maryland
- County: Washington
- Established: 1767
- Incorporated: 1840

Area
  - Total: 0.55 sq mi (1.43 km^{2})
  - Land: 0.55 sq mi (1.43 km^{2})
  - Water: 0 sq mi (0.00 km^{2})
- Elevation: 495 ft (151 m)

Population (2020)
  - Total: 852
  - Density: 1,546.5/sq mi (597.12/km^{2})
- Time zone: UTC-5 (Eastern (EST))
  - Summer (DST): UTC-4 (EDT)
- ZIP code: 21734
- Area codes: 301, 240
- FIPS code: 24-31100
- GNIS feature ID: 2390196
- Website: www.funkstown.com

Funkstown is a town in Washington County, Maryland, United States. As of the 2020 census, Funkstown had a population of 852.

== History ==
Originally 88 acres (360,000 m^{2}) were sold to Henry Funk by Frederick Calvert, 6th Baron Baltimore in 1754 and settled as Jerusalem.

The Civil War Battle of Funkstown took place July 10, 1863, during the Gettysburg campaign as Robert E. Lee's Army of Northern Virginia retreated toward Virginia in the week following the Battle of Gettysburg. Union forces of the Army of the Potomac attacked the rear guard of the Confederate Army of Northern Virginia during its retreat from Pennsylvania following the Battle of Gettysburg.

A strong Confederate presence at Funkstown threatened any Union advance against Gen. Robert E. Lee's position near Williamsport and the Potomac River as he retreated to Virginia after the Battle of Gettysburg. Maj. Gen. J.E.B. Stuart's cavalry, posted at Funkstown, posed a serious risk to the Federal right and rear if the Union army lunged west from Boonsboro. Stuart, meanwhile, determined to wage a spirited defense to ensure Lee time to complete fortifications protecting his army and his avenue of retreat.

As Brig. Gen. John Buford's Federal cavalry division cautiously approached Funkstown via the National Road on Friday morning July 10, 1863, it encountered Stuart's crescent-shaped, three-mile-long battle line. It was Stuart's first defensive battle since reentering Maryland. The high ground constituted Stuart's extreme right, held by Preston Chew's horse artillery. A nearby stone barn and barnyard wall proved a superb defensive position for the 34th Virginia Battalion's dismounted cavalry. Col. Thomas C. Devin's dismounted Union cavalry brigade attacked about 8:00 a.m. By mid-afternoon, with Buford's cavalrymen running low on ammunition and gaining little ground, Col. Lewis A. Grant's First Vermont Brigade of infantry arrived and jabbed at the Confederate center less than one mile away. Unbeknownst to the Vermonters, Gen. George T. Anderson's Confederate brigade now faced them, the first time opposing infantry had clashed since the Battle of Gettysburg.

By early evening, the Union Army began withdrawing south towards Beaver Creek. Stuart had kept the Federals at bay for yet another day. The day-long battle east of the road resulted in 479 casualties. The Chaney house served as a hospital. At the Keller home, Confederate Major Henry D. McDaniel, later the governor of Georgia, survived his wounds.

The house at 16 W. Cemetery St. remained a church until it burned down a second time, finally being rebuilt into the existing house in 1913.

The Funkstown Historic District was listed on the National Register of Historic Places in 2000.

As of 2017 the town park is listed as 77.04 acres and the town area, less the park, is 208.77 acres for a grand total of 285.81 acres.

== Geography ==
Funkstown is located on Antietam Creek, south of Hagerstown.

According to the United States Census Bureau, the town has a total area of 0.36 square miles (0.93 km^{2}), all land. Antietam Creek flows to the south within the city limits.

=== Climate ===
The climate in this area is characterized by hot, humid summers and generally mild to cool winters. According to the Köppen Climate Classification system, Funkstown has a humid subtropical climate, abbreviated "Cfa" on climate maps.

== Transportation ==
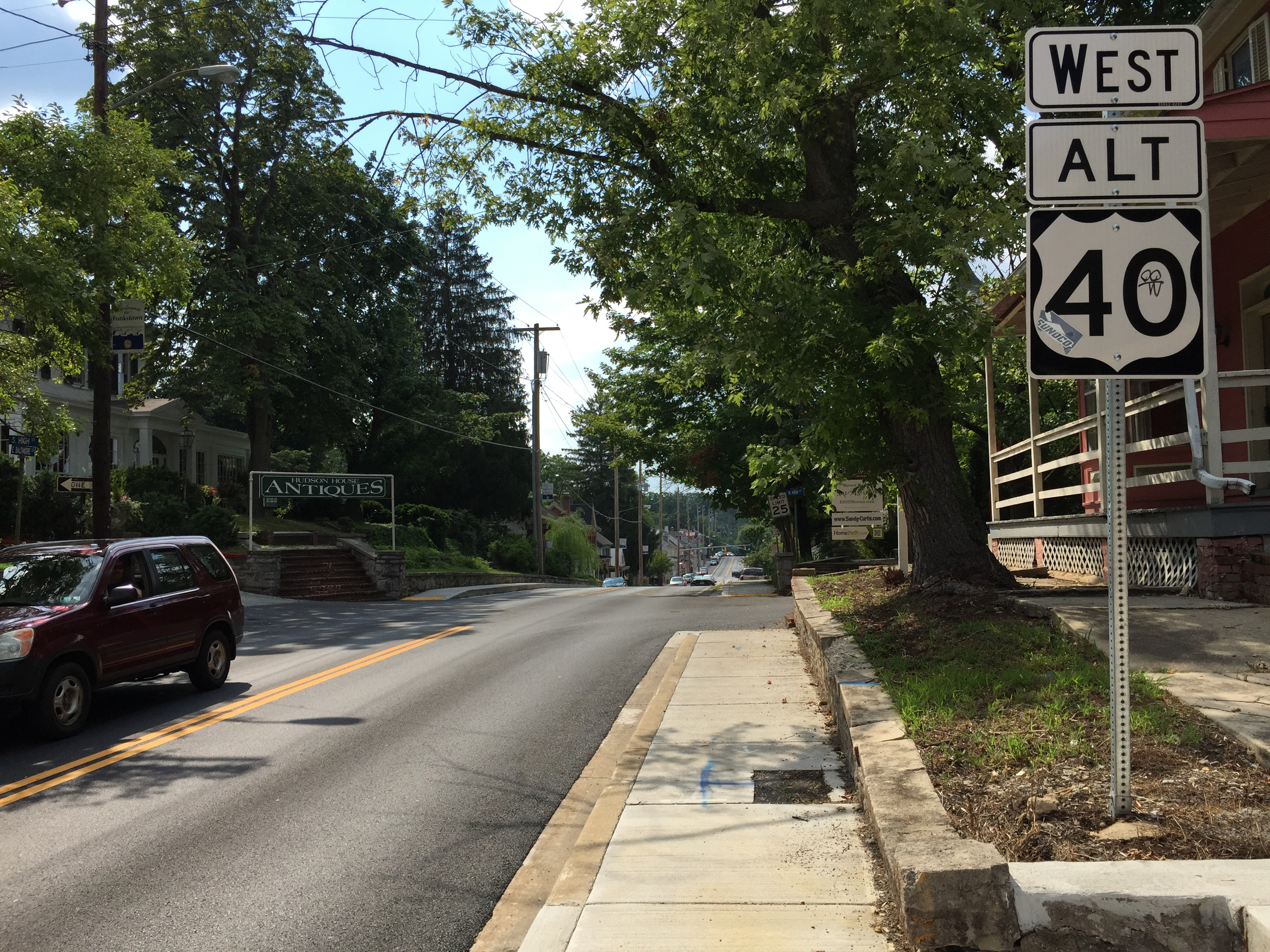
US 40 Alternate in central Funkstown

The main means of transport to and from Funkstown are by road. U.S. Route 40 Alternate is the only significant highway serving Funkstown directly. US 40 Alt follows Frederick Road, Baltimore Street and Westside Street as it traverses the town. To the west, US 40 Alt ends in Hagerstown, while heading east, it passes through Boonsboro on its way to Frederick. Interstate 70 passes just south of the town limits, but the closest interchanges are at U.S. Route 40 and Maryland Route 65, both over a mile distant.

== Demographics ==
Historical population
Census	Pop.	Note	%±
1850	793		—
1860	647		−18.4%
1870	671		3.7%
1880	600		−10.6%
1900	559		—
1910	568		1.6%
1920	620		9.2%
1930	700		12.9%
1940	798		14.0%
1950	879		10.2%
1960	968		10.1%
1970	1,051		8.6%
1980	1,103		4.9%
1990	1,136		3.0%
2000	983		−13.5%
2010	904		−8.0%
2020	852		−5.8%
U.S. Decennial Census

=== 2010 census ===
As of the census of 2010, there were 904 people, 417 households, and 226 families living in the town. The population density was 2,511.1 inhabitants per square mile (969.5/km^{2}). There were 460 housing units at an average density of 1,277.8 per square mile (493.4/km^{2}). The racial makeup of the town was 96.8% White, 1.2% African American, 0.2% Native American, 0.6% Asian, 0.1% Pacific Islander, 0.2% from other races, and 0.9% from two or more races. Hispanic or Latino of any race were 0.4% of the population.

There were 417 households, of which 22.3% had children under the age of 18 living with them, 38.6% were married couples living together, 12.5% had a female householder with no husband present, 3.1% had a male householder with no wife present, and 45.8% were non-families. 37.6% of all households were made up of individuals, and 10.8% had someone living alone who was 65 years of age or older. The average household size was 2.13 and the average family size was 2.76.

The median age in the town was 46.2 years. 17.6% of residents were under the age of 18; 5.8% were between the ages of 18 and 24; 24.6% were from 25 to 44; 35.3% were from 45 to 64; and 16.7% were 65 years of age or older. The gender makeup of the town was 49.2% male and 50.8% female.
