= Baltimore and Reisterstown Turnpike =

Early 19th-century toll road and feeder to the National Road

The Baltimore and Reisterstown Turnpike, officially The President, Managers and Company of the Reisterstown Turnpike Road, began as a 19-mile (31 km) stone-surfaced toll road chartered on 17 January 1805 to link Baltimore with the village of Reisterstown. Supplementary acts and sister companies soon carried the roadway northwest through Westminster to Littlestown at the Maryland–Pennsylvania boundary, giving the company about 62 mi (100 km) under toll by the time the last gate was licensed on 8 January 1810, a project that cost roughly US $600 000 and earned contemporary praise in 1899, as “one of the best turnpikes leading out of Baltimore.”

The road became the easternmost section of a privately financed corridor that, via the Westminster & Hagerstown and Cumberland turnpikes, funneled Baltimore traffic onto the federally funded National Road at Cumberland after 1811—two decades before Maryland formally accepted the National Road in 1833.

The original alignment survives today as Maryland Route 140 within Baltimore County and as Maryland Route 30 north of Reisterstown. Remnants include a dressed stone “15 M to B” milepost and archaeological remains of the Reisterstown tollhouse, both of which are listed in the Maryland Inventory of Historic Properties.

== History ==
Long before these turnpike efforts, cartographers recorded a colonial era “Patapsco Road” that linked the Conewago settlement at Hanover with Baltimore by way of the Patapsco valley. By 1741, a way was opened between the settlement on the Conewago, Hanover, and that on the Patapsco, near Baltimore. This early path roughly followed the line of the later Hanover-Reisterstown-Baltimore turnpikes.

=== The turnpikes of (1787–1801) ===
Between 1787 and 1801, the Maryland General Assembly empowered the Baltimore County Levy Court to improve the Reisterstown Road and three companion routes with county taxes. Chapter XXIII of the 1787 session laws prescribed a 66 ft (20 m) right of way, a 40 ft stone-crowned carriageway, and authorized toll gates funded by a county property levy of US$0.19 per $100 plus optional convict labor. The first gate opened only in October 1793, and receipts never equaled outlays. Despite ten amendments, a 1801 surtax, and authority to borrow US$1,600, auditors still reported a US$21,000 deficit (recorded as £7,864) and a backlog of unpaid vouchers in October 1801. In 1802, fifteen years after the original act, it was ordered that the Reisterstown turnpike should be recorded as completed.

=== The turnpikes of (1804–1805) ===
==== Charter and financing ====
“An Act to Incorporate Companies to make Several Turnpike Roads through Baltimore County” (1804 sess., ch 51) created three turnpike corporations; one, the President, Managers and Company of the Reisterstown Turnpike Road, was empowered to build from Baltimore through Reisterstown toward Hanover or Westminster and thence to the Pennsylvania line. The organizers of the company were William Owings, Solomon Etting, David Williamson, Edward Johnson, Dr. John Cromwell, and Charles Carman. The charter fixed capital at US$160,000, divided into 8,000 shares at US$20 each; directors could levy assessments up to US$1.25 per share per month.

A January 1805 supplement clarified two branches: (a) north-north-west via Hanover to the York and Carlisle Turnpike at the Pennsylvania line, and (b) west via Westminster and Emmitsburg to intersect the Gettysburg road near Petersburg (Taneytown).

The 1804 charter also required:

- 66 ft (20 m) right of way made over and upon the beds of existing roads;
- a 20 ft (6.1 m) stone or gravel roadway;
- the center line of the road was to be raised eighteen inches above the side ditches;
- a compacted broken stone crown to shed water;
- maximum gradient 4 percent (6 percent over the Catoctin and South mountains), and
- continuous maintenance by the company.

Baltimore, Anne Arundel, and Frederick counties were to be reimbursed for the construction costs of their respective roads. After each ten-mile section passed state inspection, the governor licensed a toll gate. Statutory rates ranged from 12½ ¢ for a single horse and rider to 3¢ per mile for a four-horse coach; dividends were capped at 10 percent.

==== Construction (1805–1810) ====
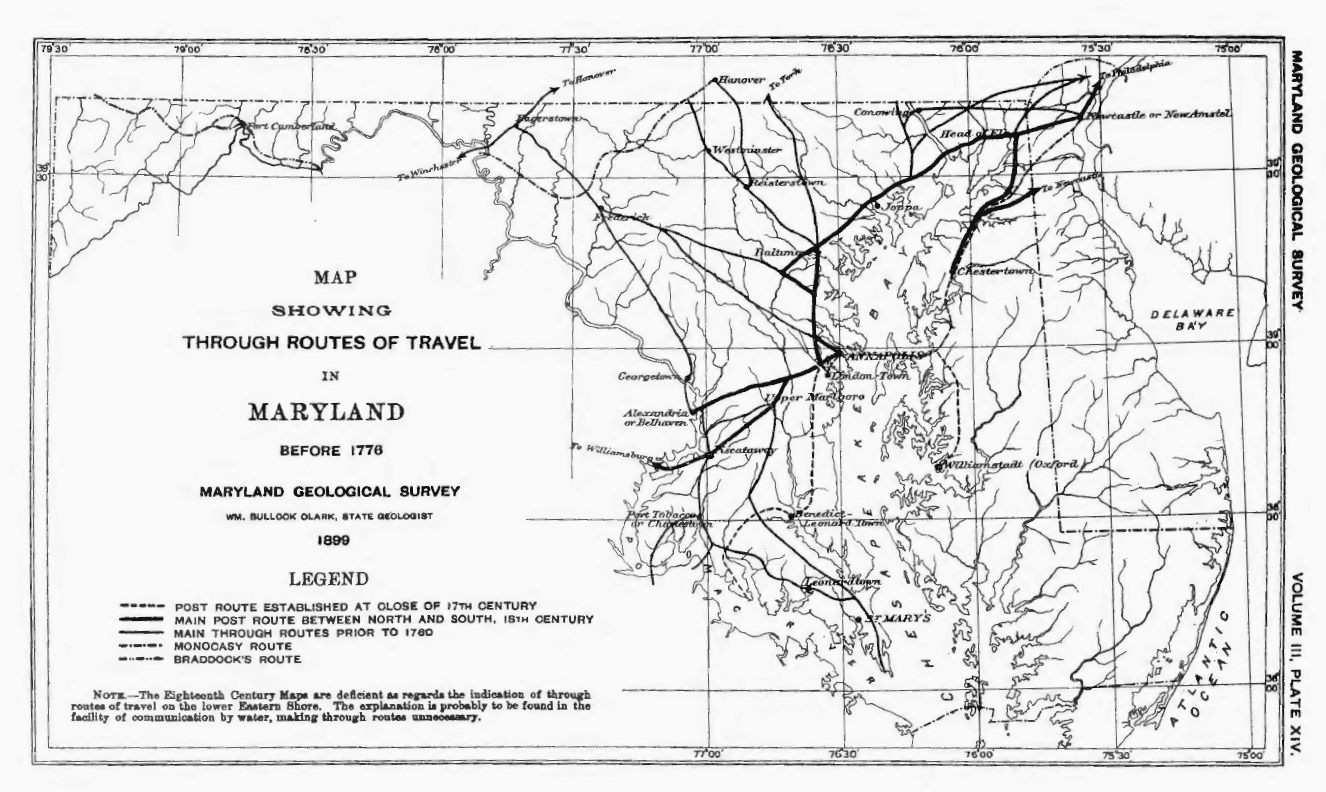
1899 Routes of Travel in Maryland before 1776 depicting the Reisterstown Turnpike

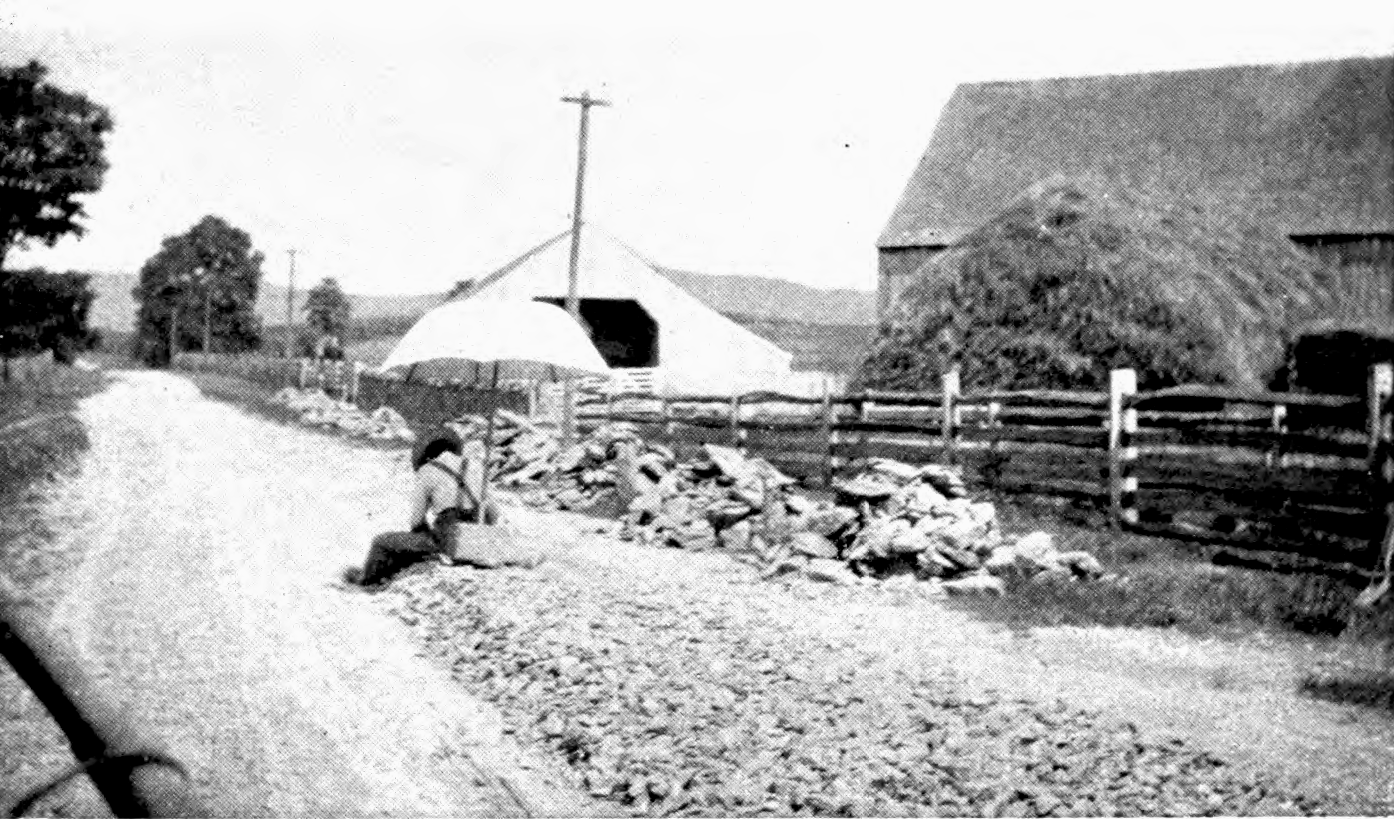
Road construction using stone crushed by hand in Maryland

A January 1805 supplement (ch. 15) permitted construction to commence once two-thirds of the shares had been subscribed and one-tenth of the capital had been paid. In 1806, this had occurred, and construction began under the direction of Caleb Merryman, civil engineer, and superintendent Cornelius Guest. Later, company minutes recorded 30 miles graded on the Hanover branch and 6 miles on the Westminster branch; by 1807, ten of those miles were fully macadamized at a cost of roughly US $10,000 per mile. The roadway used a 12 in (30 cm) compacted broken stone base, influenced by McAdam’s work.

In 1812, David Shriver Jr., a mill owner and self-taught civil engineer from Union Mills, became the engineer in charge of locating the turnpike and its construction. Except where straighter cuts reduced cost, the alignment followed existing county roads.

The Maryland company itself completed all mileage within the state, including the Reisterstown main line and both Hanover and Westminster-direction branches, by January 8, 1810. The connection from the state line at Littlestown to Gettysburg was supplied by a separately chartered Pennsylvania company, which was completed in 1811, providing a through road from Gettysburg to Baltimore.

==== Operations and finances (1810–1915) ====
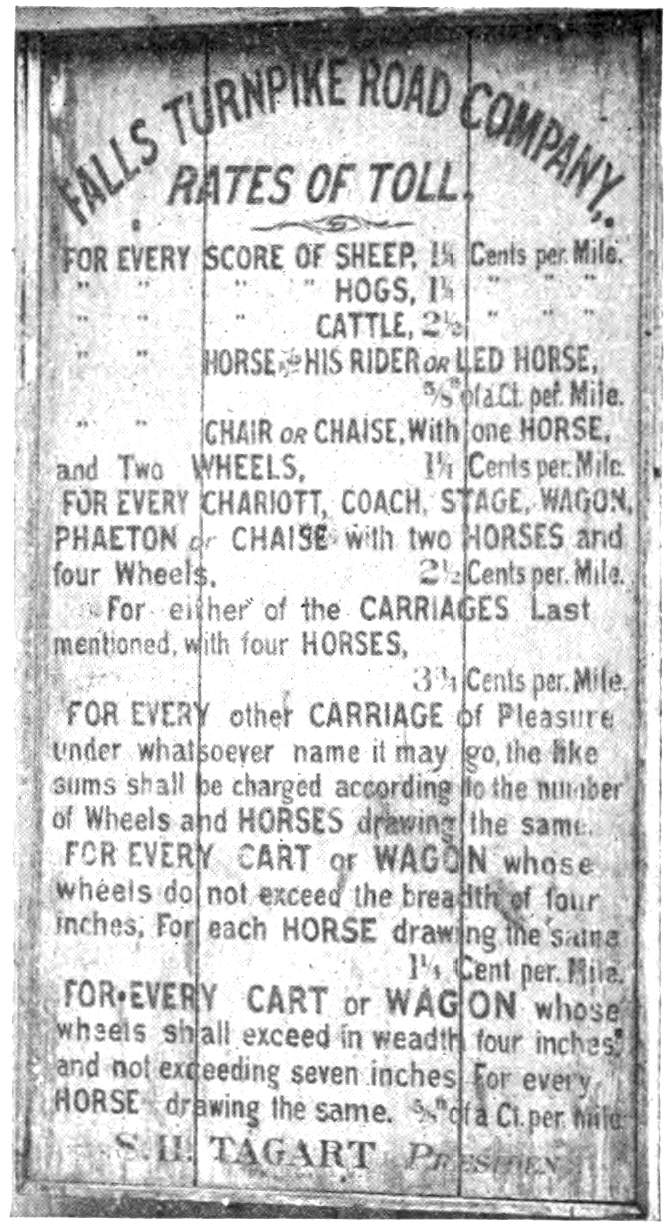
Old signboard giving the rates of toll on animals and vehicles on Maryland turnpike

An 1818 executive report estimated the total cost at nearly US$638,000—approximately US$11,000 per mile. Dividend statements filed with Governor Charles Goldsborough show payouts rising from 3 percent in 1813 to 6 percent by 1817. As of 1839, the company declared a dividend of 2.5% for the year and, in 1844, a dividend of 2 percent. In 1899, the company had reduced its mileage to 48 miles. It was the second-longest turnpike in the state, with the Baltimore and Frederick Turnpike longer at 57 miles. Still, at that time, it was considered to be one of the best of the Baltimore-area turnpikes. Rail competition eroded toll traffic after 1873, and collection north of Owings Mills ceased in 1899. The turnpike company began selling portions of its right-of-way, first in 1825 and then again in 1830, to the City of Baltimore. The State Roads Commission ledgers indicate limited but continuous maintenance until Maryland purchased the right of way in 1915 and subsequently dissolved the corporation in 1916.

The road became part of the state network; it was numbered U.S. Route 140 in 1926 and redesignated MD 140/MD 97 in 1977.

==== State Route description ====
Mile 0 begins at North Howard & West Madison Streets, climbs to Druid Hill ridge (mile 1.5), crosses Gwynns Falls at mile 4.3, and follows today’s MD 140 past the Worthington Milestone (mile 6.0). It reaches Cherry Hill (mile 13.8) and ends at Main St., Reisterstown (mile 18.9).

== Legacy ==
=== Convict labor ===
In 1788, Maryland passed legislation that created a new court in Baltimore County, the Court of Oyer and Terminer and Gaol Delivery. This court was established to handle criminal cases within Baltimore County, with jurisdiction over all felonies and other crimes, offenses, and misdemeanors.

The court could sentence convicted men to up to seven years' hard labor, working on the public roads of Baltimore County or maintaining the streets and basins of Baltimore. Such laws became known as "wheelbarrow" laws. Later, the Turnpike Laws of 1805 added the option to use convict labor in their construction.

Persons convicted of vagrancy were ordered to work on the construction of these turnpikes in Baltimore, as well as in the other counties with turnpikes. Convict labor provided most of the labor force to construct these turnpikes in Baltimore County. In 1809, convicts condemned to laboring on road construction could appeal their sentence to penal confinement. This system of contract labor continued until 1935, when federal legislation outlawed the practice (Chapter 213, Acts of 1937).

=== National Road ===
The Baltimore and Reisterstown Turnpike formed the eastern leg of a continuous private turnpike route connecting Baltimore to Cumberland. Although the federally funded National Road officially began at Cumberland in 1811, Maryland merchants and travelers used the Reisterstown and successor pikes (e.g., Westminster and Hagerstown turnpikes) to reach its eastern terminus. This corridor became functionally complete by the early 1810s, long before Maryland formally accepted the National Road in 1833. Reisterstown served as a major rest and relay point on this route, linking southern Pennsylvania to Baltimore by stagecoach and freight wagon. The turnpike corridor was later incorporated into the United States Numbered Highway System as US 140 in 1926 and redesignated as Maryland Route 30, Maryland Route 140, and Maryland Route 97 in 1977.
