= Williamsport, Maryland =

- Town
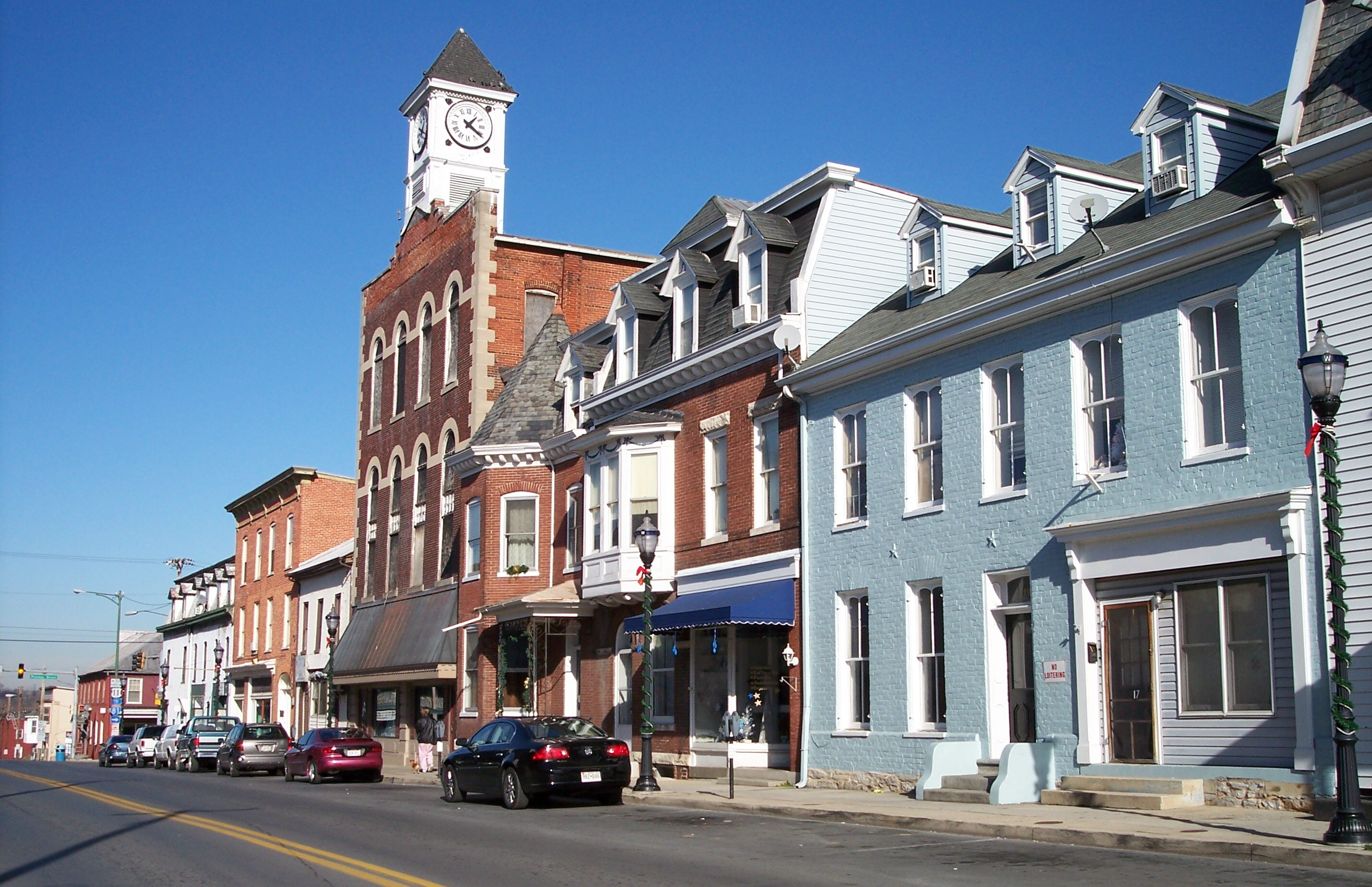
- Conococheague Street in Williamsport in 2007

- Flag Seal

- Location of Williamsport, Maryland
- Coordinates: 39°35′50″N 77°49′05″W
- Country: United States
- State: Maryland
- County: Washington
- Incorporated: 1823

Government
  - Type: Mayor–council

Area
  - Total: 0.98 sq mi (2.55 km^{2})
  - Land: 0.98 sq mi (2.55 km^{2})
  - Water: 0 sq mi (0.00 km^{2})
- Elevation: 420 ft (130 m)

Population (2020)
  - Total: 2,083
  - Density: 2,118.4/sq mi (817.91/km^{2})
- Time zone: UTC-5 (Eastern (EST))
  - Summer (DST): UTC-4 (EDT)
- ZIP code: 21795
- Area codes: 301, 240
- FIPS code: 24-85100
- GNIS feature ID: 2391487
- Website: http://williamsportmd.gov/

Williamsport is an incorporated town in Washington County, Maryland, United States. As of the 2020 census, Williamsport had a population of 2,083.

== Geography ==
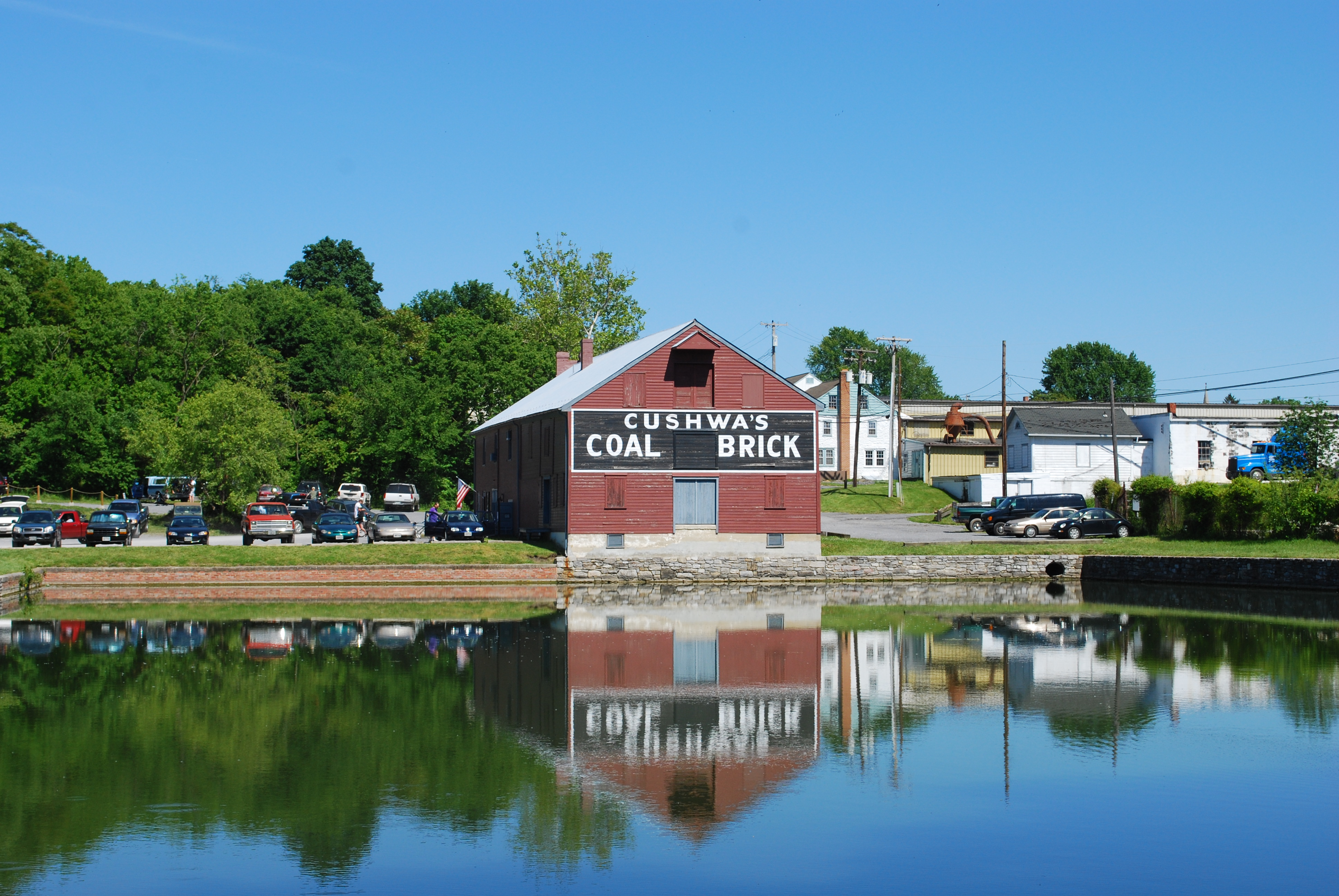
Cushwa Basin and Visitor Center

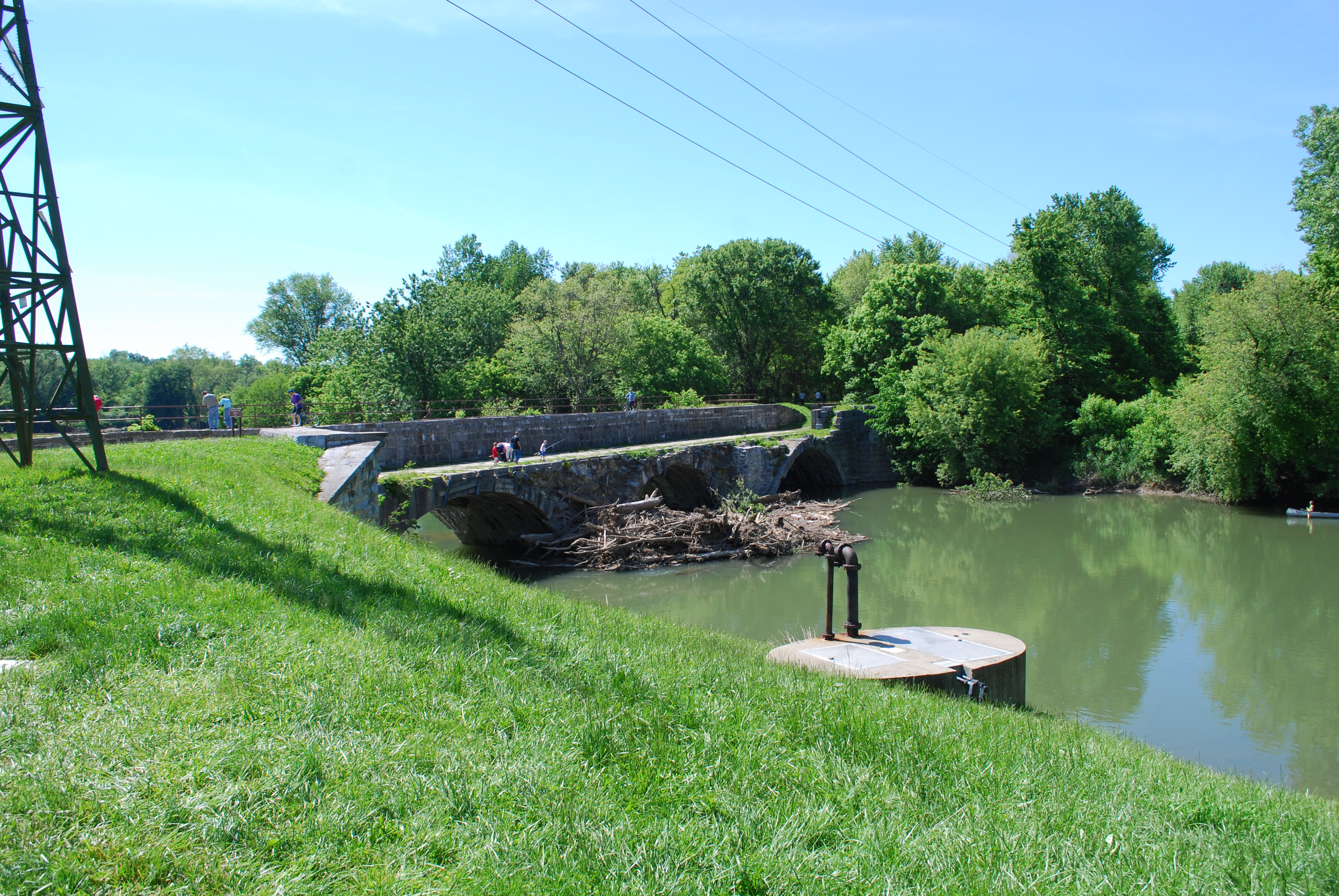
Conococheague Creek Aqueduct

According to the United States Census Bureau, the town has a total area of 1.04 square miles (2.69 km^{2}), all land.

Williamsport is located 7.69 mi (12.38 km) southwest of Hagerstown and 16.23 mi (26.12 km) north of Martinsburg, West Virginia.

=== Climate ===
The climate in this area is characterized by hot, humid summers and generally mild to cool winters. According to the Köppen Climate Classification system, Williamsport has a humid subtropical climate, abbreviated "Cfa" on climate maps.

== Demographics ==
Historical population
Census	Pop.	Note	%±
1850	1,091		—
1860	1,016		−6.9%
1870	1,283		26.3%
1880	1,503		17.1%
1890	1,277		−15.0%
1900	1,472		15.3%
1910	1,571		6.7%
1920	1,615		2.8%
1930	1,775		9.9%
1940	1,772		−0.2%
1950	1,890		6.7%
1960	1,853		−2.0%
1970	2,270		22.5%
1980	2,153		−5.2%
1990	2,103		−2.3%
2000	1,868		−11.2%
2010	2,137		14.4%
2020	2,083		−2.5%
U.S. Decennial Census

=== 2020 census ===
As of the 2020 census, Williamsport had a population of 2,083. The median age was 46.7 years. 18.8% of residents were under the age of 18 and 25.9% of residents were 65 years of age or older. For every 100 females there were 86.6 males, and for every 100 females age 18 and over there were 84.9 males age 18 and over.

97.6% of residents lived in urban areas, while 2.4% lived in rural areas.

There were 998 households in Williamsport, of which 24.6% had children under the age of 18 living in them. Of all households, 26.5% were married-couple households, 26.2% were households with a male householder and no spouse or partner present, and 38.2% were households with a female householder and no spouse or partner present. About 43.3% of all households were made up of individuals and 20.4% had someone living alone who was 65 years of age or older.

There were 1,076 housing units, of which 7.2% were vacant. The homeowner vacancy rate was 1.2% and the rental vacancy rate was 3.9%.

Racial composition as of the 2020 census
Race	Number	Percent
White	1,858	89.2%
Black or African American	82	3.9%
American Indian and Alaska Native	2	0.1%
Asian	14	0.7%
Native Hawaiian and Other Pacific Islander	1	0.0%
Some other race	20	1.0%
Two or more races	106	5.1%
Hispanic or Latino (of any race)	55	2.6%

=== 2010 census ===
As of the census of 2010, there were 2,137 people, 960 households, and 543 families residing in the town. The population density was 2,054.8 inhabitants per square mile (793.4/km^{2}). There were 1,080 housing units at an average density of 1,038.5 per square mile (401.0/km^{2}). The racial makeup of the town was 95.6% White, 2.5% African American, 0.1% Native American, 0.3% Asian, 0.3% from other races, and 1.1% from two or more races. Hispanic or Latino of any race were 1.1% of the population.

There were 960 households, of which 25.9% had children under the age of 18 living with them, 36.7% were married couples living together, 12.9% had a female householder with no husband present, 7.0% had a male householder with no wife present, and 43.4% were non-families. 38.5% of all households were made up of individuals, and 19.8% had someone living alone who was 65 years of age or older. The average household size was 2.12 and the average family size was 2.73.

The median age in the town was 44.9 years. 19% of residents were under the age of 18; 7.8% were between the ages of 18 and 24; 23.3% were from 25 to 44; 26.4% were from 45 to 64; and 23.4% were 65 years of age or older. The gender makeup of the town was 46.0% male and 54.0% female.

=== 2000 census ===
As of the census of 2000, there were 1,868 people, 785 households, and 471 families residing in the town. The population density was 1,725.6 inhabitants per square mile (666.3/km^{2}). There were 836 housing units at an average density of 772.3 per square mile (298.2/km^{2}). The racial makeup of the town was 98.29% White, 0.80% African American, 0.05% Native American, 0.16% Asian, 0.27% from other races, and 0.43% from two or more races. Hispanic or Latino of any race were 0.27% of the population.

There were 785 households, out of which 27.0% had children under the age of 18 living with them, 43.7% were married couples living together, 12.0% had a female householder with no husband present, and 40.0% were non-families. 35.7% of all households were made up of individuals, and 17.6% had someone living alone who was 65 years of age or older. The average household size was 2.21 and the average family size was 2.84.

In the town, the population was spread out, with 20.0% under the age of 18, 7.2% from 18 to 24, 26.3% from 25 to 44, 22.8% from 45 to 64, and 23.7% who were 65 years of age or older. The median age was 43 years. For every 100 females, there were 80.7 males. For every 100 females age 18 and over, there were 76.5 males.

The median income for a household in the town was $34,243, and the median income for a family was $41,115. Males had a median income of $30,833 versus $21,708 for females. The per capita income for the town was $16,179. About 7.4% of families and 8.5% of the population were below the poverty line, including 4.8% of those under age 18 and 14.8% of those age 65 or over.

== Notable people ==
- Nick Adenhart, former MLB pitcher
- Katharine Edgar Byron, former Member, U.S. House of Representatives from Maryland's 6th district
- William Devereux Byron II, former Member, U.S. House of Representatives from Maryland's 6th district
- Dave Cole, former MLB pitcher
- Gina Marie Groh, United States District Court Judge
- Dean Lesher, California newspaper publisher

== History ==
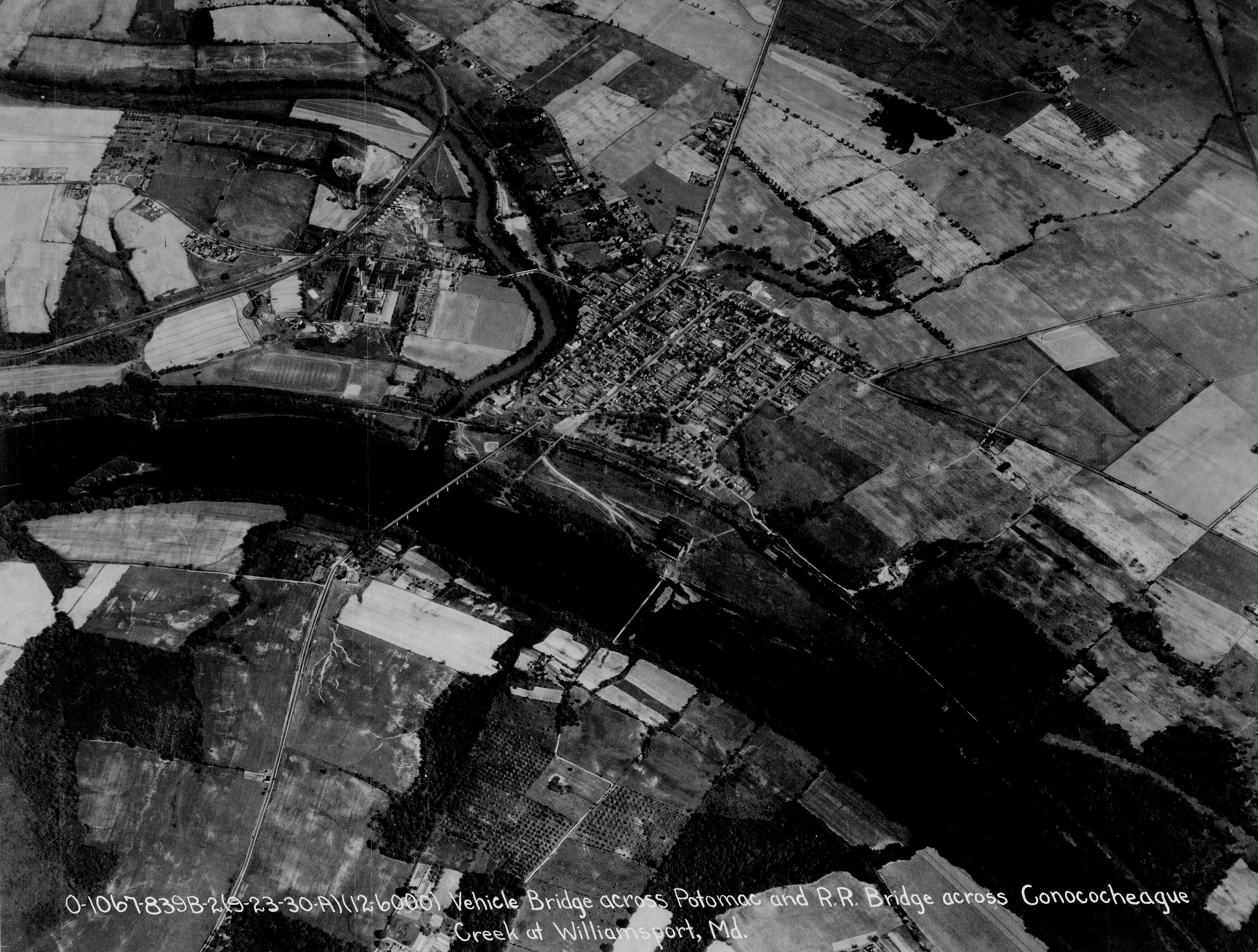
Aerial view of Williamsport in 1930

The town lies on one of the early Native American trails between New York and the Carolinas. In the mid-18th century, tens of thousands of European settlers and pioneer families with their wagons followed the same route on the Great Wagon Road from Pennsylvania to Virginia and points south and west. In 1744, a ferry was established at the present site of Williamsport to carry the traffic across the Potomac River. Today’s travelers make the crossing on Interstate 81 a mile downriver from the town.

In 1755 the land tract of Thomas Cresap (Jr.) named "Leeds" at the future site of Williamsport would become an important supply depot for the Braddock expedition to capture the French fort Duquesne (at present Pittsburgh). Supplies were transported to this place both west from Rock Creek (today's Georgetown) and south from Pennsylvania. Col. Thomas Dunbar's 48th regiment of the British Army encamped here on May 1, 1755, before ferrying across the Potomac River and marching two days south to rejoin Sir Thomas Halkett's 44th regiment north of Winchester, Virginia. Just over two months later Dunbar, the highest-ranking surviving, unwounded officer, would lead the remains of the tattered army through Williamsport to Frederick, Maryland on the retreat to Philadelphia.

The land of present-day Williamsport was previously owned by Otho Holland Williams, a Continental Army officer in the American Revolutionary War, and for whom the town is named.

Cedar Grove, Daniel Donnelly House, Elmwood, Rose Hill, Sprechers Mill House, Springfield Farm, Tammany, and the Williamsport Historic District are listed on the National Register of Historic Places.

=== Economic growth ===
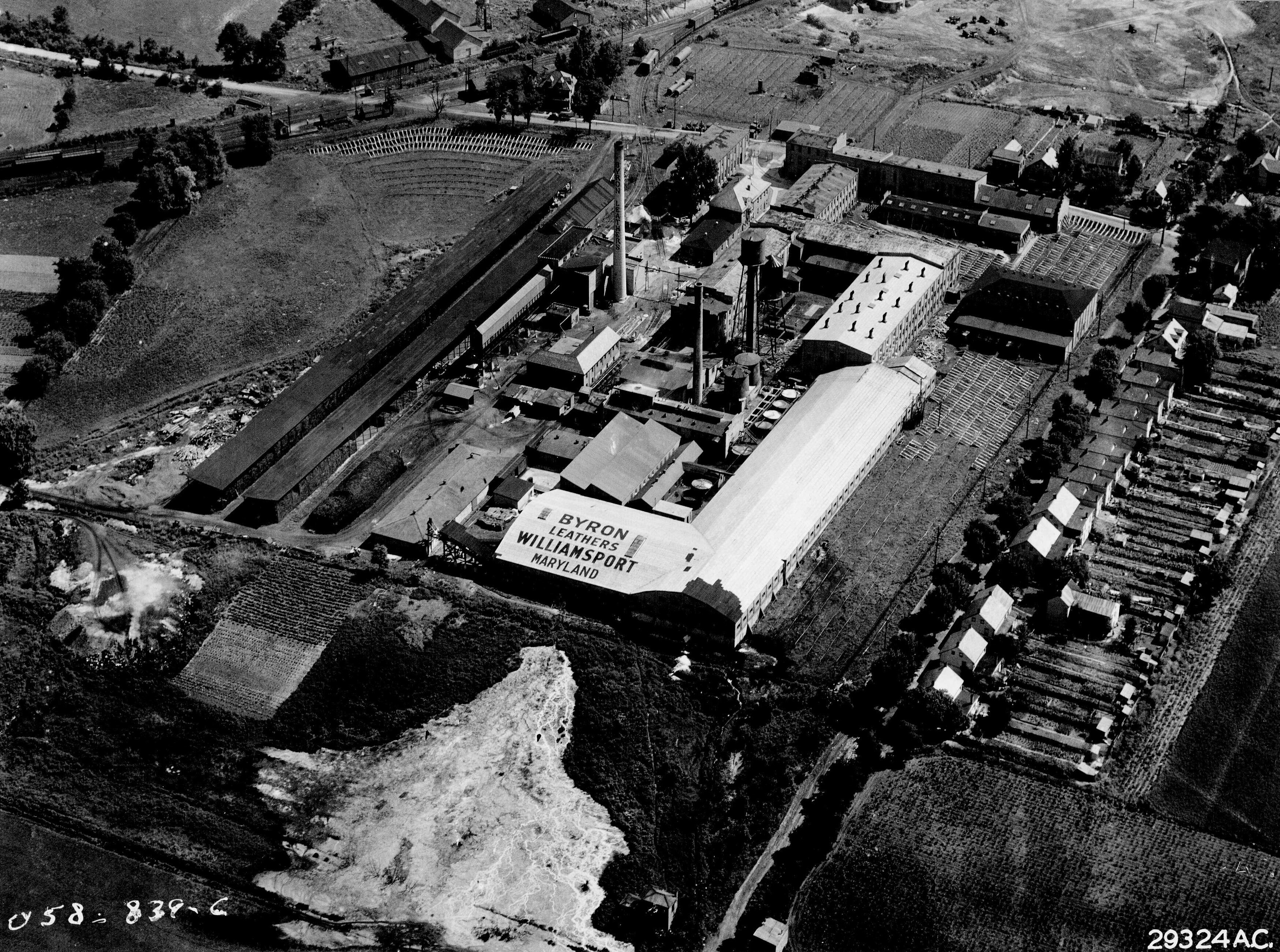
W.D. Byron & Sons Tannery, 1945

In 1834, boats using a portion of the newly built Chesapeake and Ohio Canal were able to reach Williamsport from Washington, D.C. The canal itself was extended to Williamsport in 1835. The canal became an important commercial route which connected the area with the lower Potomac River region and the Chesapeake Bay, and later with the Cumberland, Maryland region as the canal construction continued westward. Williamsport became a very popular waterfront town which benefited the economy. In 1873, the Western Maryland Railway extended its line from Hagerstown to Williamsport, in order to gain access to canal traffic. Coal from Cumberland area mines was one of the principal commodities transferred from canal barges to rail cars at Williamsport.

=== Flooding ===
In 1863, during the Civil War, the overflowing flooding waters of the river prevented General Robert E. Lee's army, on its retreat from Gettysburg, from crossing and making it safely into Virginia for several days. A large flood in 1924 caused extensive damage to the canal, which was then permanently shut down.

== Recent developments ==
The town's historic core was added to the National Register of Historic Places as the Williamsport Historic District in 2001.

The town in May 2010 secured Michael Sparks, a previous town consultant and writer of a revitalization feasibility study, as Director of Economic and Community Development to revitalize downtown and attract tourism. Mr. Sparks outlined a revitalization initiative with the acronym of C.A.R.E.

- C-Connecting the various assets of the Town both physically and aesthetically.
- A-Align and inform the merchants with the needs and demographics of tourists.
- R-Rebuild through improving building conditions with Code Enforcement and Ordinance changes.
- E-Entertainment and how to create excitement to pull tourist activity into the town so that it can be built upon and capitalized on by a revitalized Town Center.

Over a one-year experiment with having a full-time economic development employee hundreds of thousands of grant dollars were secured for projects including handicap accessibility for town buildings, reconstruction of sewage pump stations, a possible bike-and-boat rental facility, and the town was approved as a Heart of the Civil War Heritage Area Target Investment Zone. Bike lanes, bike racks and directional signage were installed to better direct tourists and connect the town with the Chesapeake and Ohio Canal National Historical Park. A new permit process was set up with the Washington County, Maryland permit office, building code enforcement and heavy truck traffic were addressed. Events were coordinated that emphasized revitalization and the downtown merchants. Additionally local youth were honored for community involvement, events were coordinated for town youth and a Boys and Girls Club was created. The changes increased business in Williamsport. The town is part of a regional initiative known as the Canal Towns Partnership.

FirstEnergy corporation closed the R. Paul Smith Power Station in Williamsport on September 1, 2012.

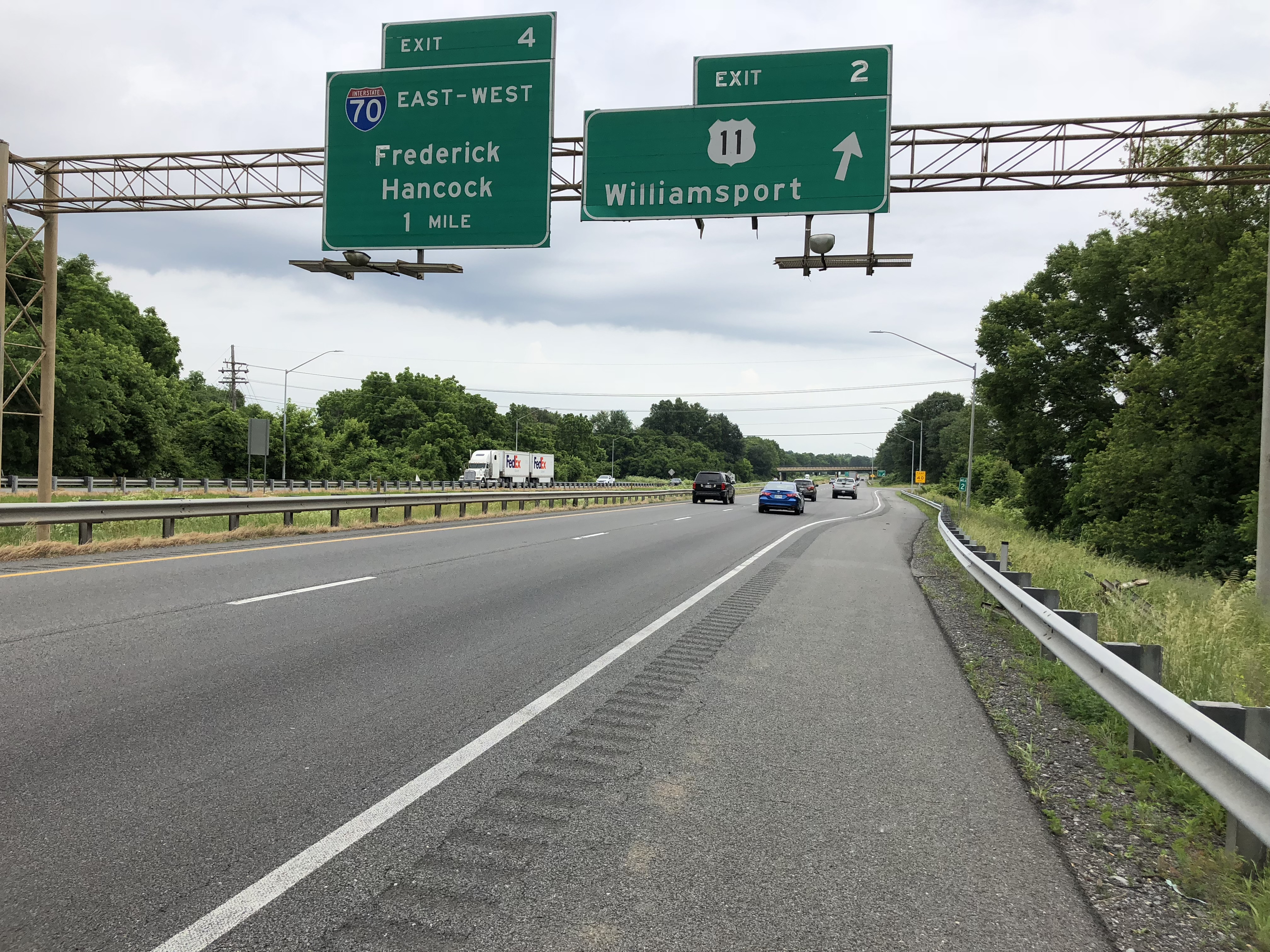
I-81 northbound at the exit for US 11 in Williamsport

On January 16, the United States Department of Homeland Security (DHS) purchased a warehouse in Williamsport to use as an Immigration and Customs Enforcement (ICE) mass detention center. Members of the community learned of the detention center after DHS purchased the property at 16220 Wright Road for $102 million. DHS plans to begin housing detained persons in the warehouse by April 2026.

== Transportation ==
The main means of transportation to and from Williamsport are by road. Interstate 81 is the main highway directly serving Williamsport, passing along the town's southeastern border. I-81 continues north towards Harrisburg and south towards Martinsburg. A few miles from Williamsport, I-81 also has an interchange with Interstate 70, which provides access to Baltimore and Pittsburgh. Other highways serving Williamsport include U.S. Route 11, Maryland Route 63 and Maryland Route 68, all of which converge in the center of town.

WCT operates bus route 441 to Williamsport, connecting the town to Hagerstown's transit center and Valley Mall.
