= Camp Misty Mount Historic District =

Historic district in Maryland, United States

- U.S. National Register of Historic Places
- U.S. Historic district
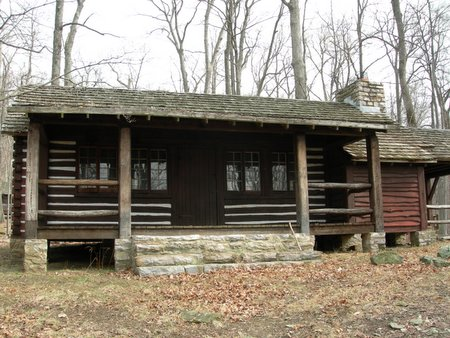

- Location within Maryland Location within the United States
- Location: Park Central Road, Thurmont, Maryland
- Coordinates: 39°38′31″N 77°26′55″W
- Area: 72 acres (29 ha)
- Built: 1937
- Architect: WPA; NPS
- Architectural style: NPS rustic architecture
- MPS: ECW Architecture in Catoctin Mountain Park MPS
- NRHP reference No.: 89001582
- Added to NRHP: October 11, 1989

Camp Misty Mount is located in Catoctin Mountain Park near Thurmont, Maryland. The camp was built by the Works Progress Administration labor program in the development of what was then known as the Catoctin Mountain Recreational Development Area, and comprises 35 rustic log buildings including sleeping cabins, administrative buildings and lodges. All were built between 1935 and 1938. The buildings are a simplified version of the National Park Service Rustic style. Misty Mount is used as a public cabin-camping facility.

Misty Mount is also known as Camp 1: Camp 2 is Camp Greentop and Camp 3, originally called Camp Hi-Catoctin and located at a much higher elevation, became Camp David.

Camp Misty Mount Historic District was listed on the National Register of Historic Places in 1989.
