= 38th G8 summit =

2012 international leader meeting in the US

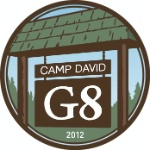

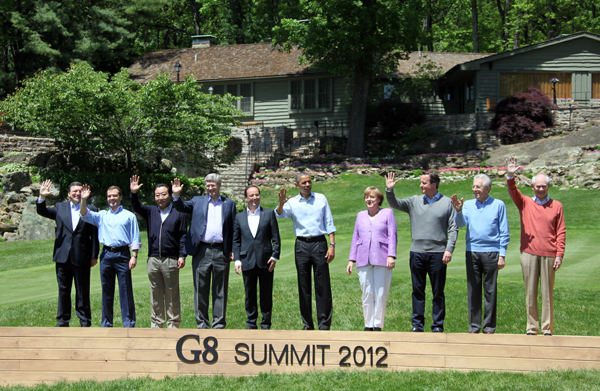
- Host country: United States
- Date: 18–19 May 2012
- Cities: Thurmont
- Venues: Camp David
- Follows: 37th G8 summit
- Precedes: 39th G8 summit

The 38th G8 summit was held in Camp David, Maryland, United States, on 18–19 May 2012.

The event occurred just before the year's NATO summit. The G8 summit was moved from Chicago, where it was going to be held back-to-back with the NATO summit, possibly due to fears of a large convergence of protestors.

This was the first summit since Russia joined the group in 1997 that was not attended by the President of Russia; former President and then-current Prime Minister Dmitry Medvedev attended in place of the recently reelected Vladimir Putin, who cited domestic obligations as his reason for not attending, though some interpreted the gesture as a sign of rising tensions between Putin's government and the West.

As of 2025, this is the most recent G7 summit to be hosted by the United States as the 46th G7 summit in 2020 was canceled due to the COVID-19 pandemic.

== Overview ==
The Group of Six (G6) was an unofficial forum which brought together the heads of the richest industrialized countries: France, Germany, Italy, Japan, the United Kingdom, and the United States. This select few became the Group of Seven (G7) starting in 1976 when Canada joined. The Group of Eight was formed with the addition of Russia in 1997. In addition, the President of the European Commission has been formally included in summits since 1981. The summits were not meant to be linked formally with wider international institutions; and in fact, a mild rebellion against the stiff formality of other international meetings was a part of the genesis of cooperation between France's president Valéry Giscard d'Estaing and West Germany's chancellor Helmut Schmidt as they conceived the initial summit of the Group of Six in 1975.

The G8 summits during the 21st century have inspired widespread debates, protests and demonstrations; and the two- or three-day event becomes more than the sum of its parts, elevating the participants, the issues and the venue as focal points for activist pressure.

The current form of the G8 is being evaluated. Some reports attribute resistance to the relatively smaller powers such as Canada and Japan, who are said to perceive a dilution of their global stature. Alternately, a larger forum for global governance may be more reflective of the present multi-polar world.

The forum is in a process of transformation by expanded membership and by other changes.

== Location ==
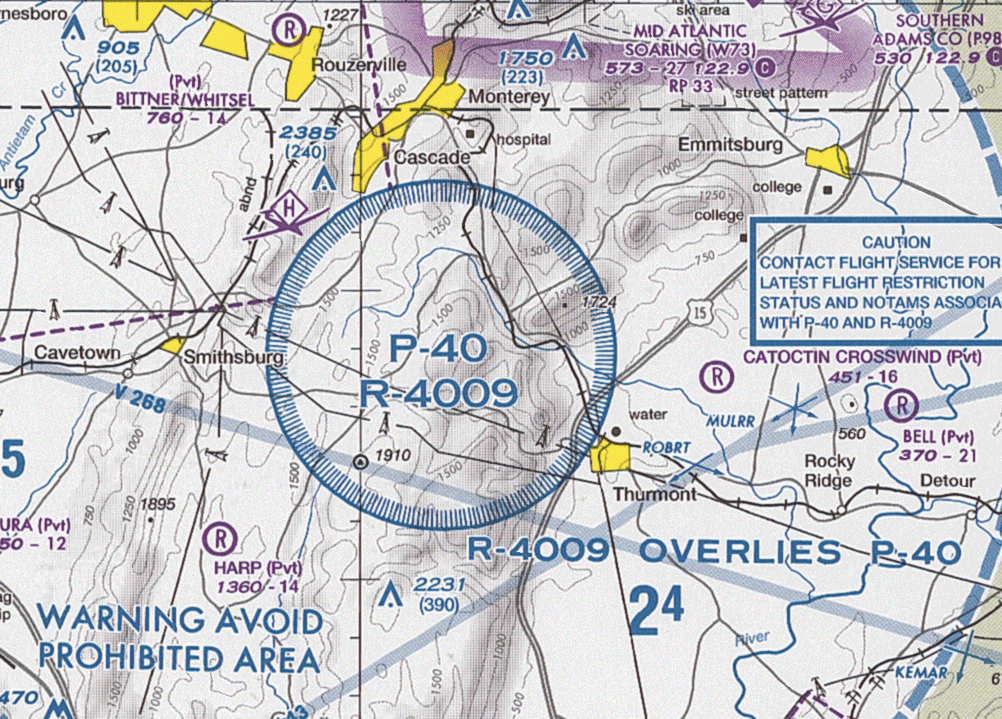
Prohibited area P-40 surrounding Camp David

A decision to move the summit from Chicago to Camp David was announced by the White House on 5 March 2012. The decision came as a surprise to Chicago officials who had been planning for the event for months. Some of those planning to protest the event took credit for the move; however, President Barack Obama denied that the decision was motivated by the demonstrations. Suggestions in the media indicated the move was to placate Russian President Vladimir Putin who said he would not attend a NATO summit in Chicago at the same time.

In preparation for the Camp David summit, two nearby parks — Cunningham Falls State Park and Catoctin Mountain Park — were closed by the Secret Service. Nonetheless officials in Frederick County, where Camp David is located, expressed hope the summit would have an overall positive economic impact for the county.

Prior to the summit, officials were unsure if there would be many protests in Thurmont, the town nearest to Camp David. In fact only a small number of peaceful protestors gathered in Thurmont with signs and a replica of an aerial drone.

== Leaders at the summit ==
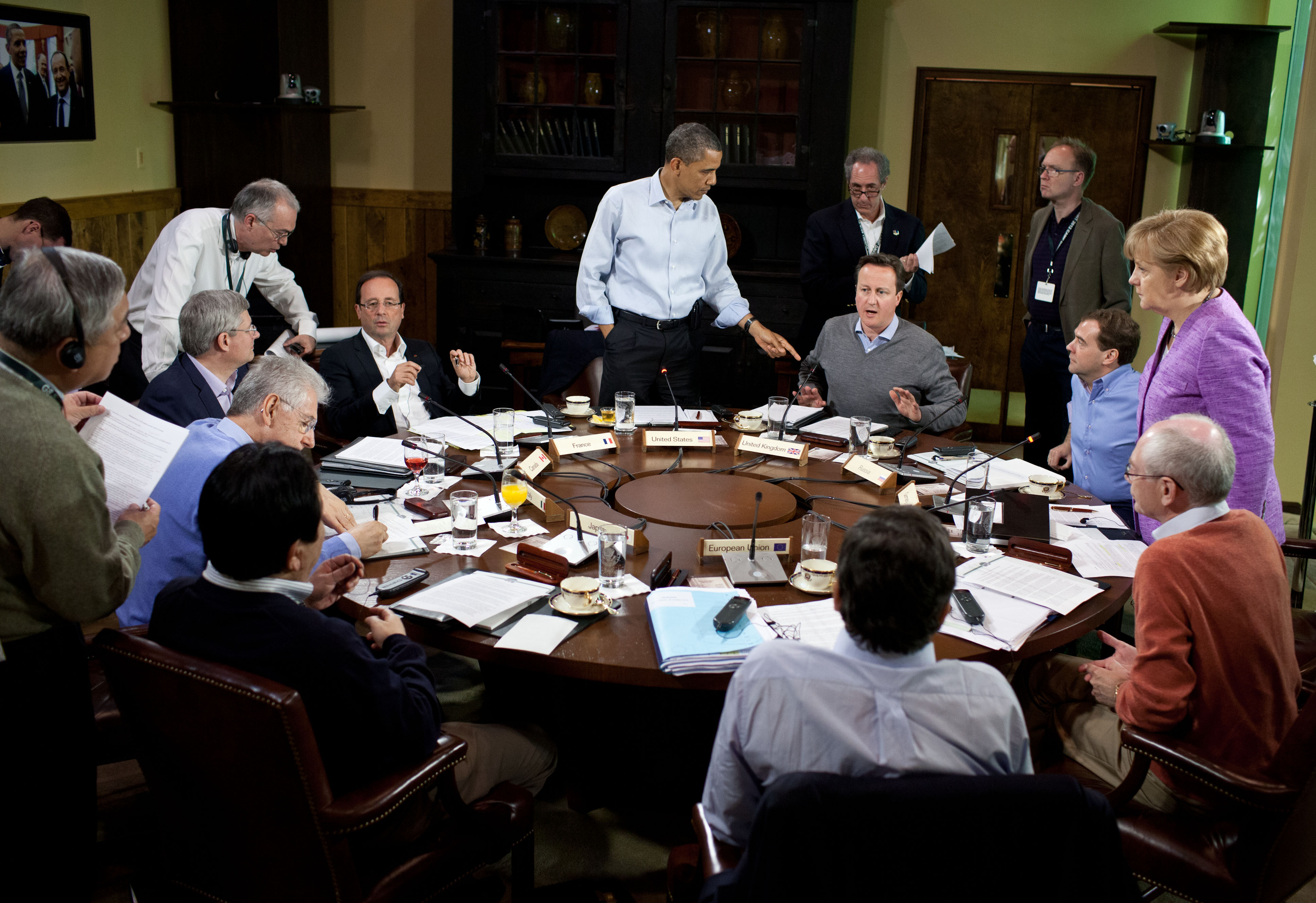
G8 summit working session focused on global and economic issues

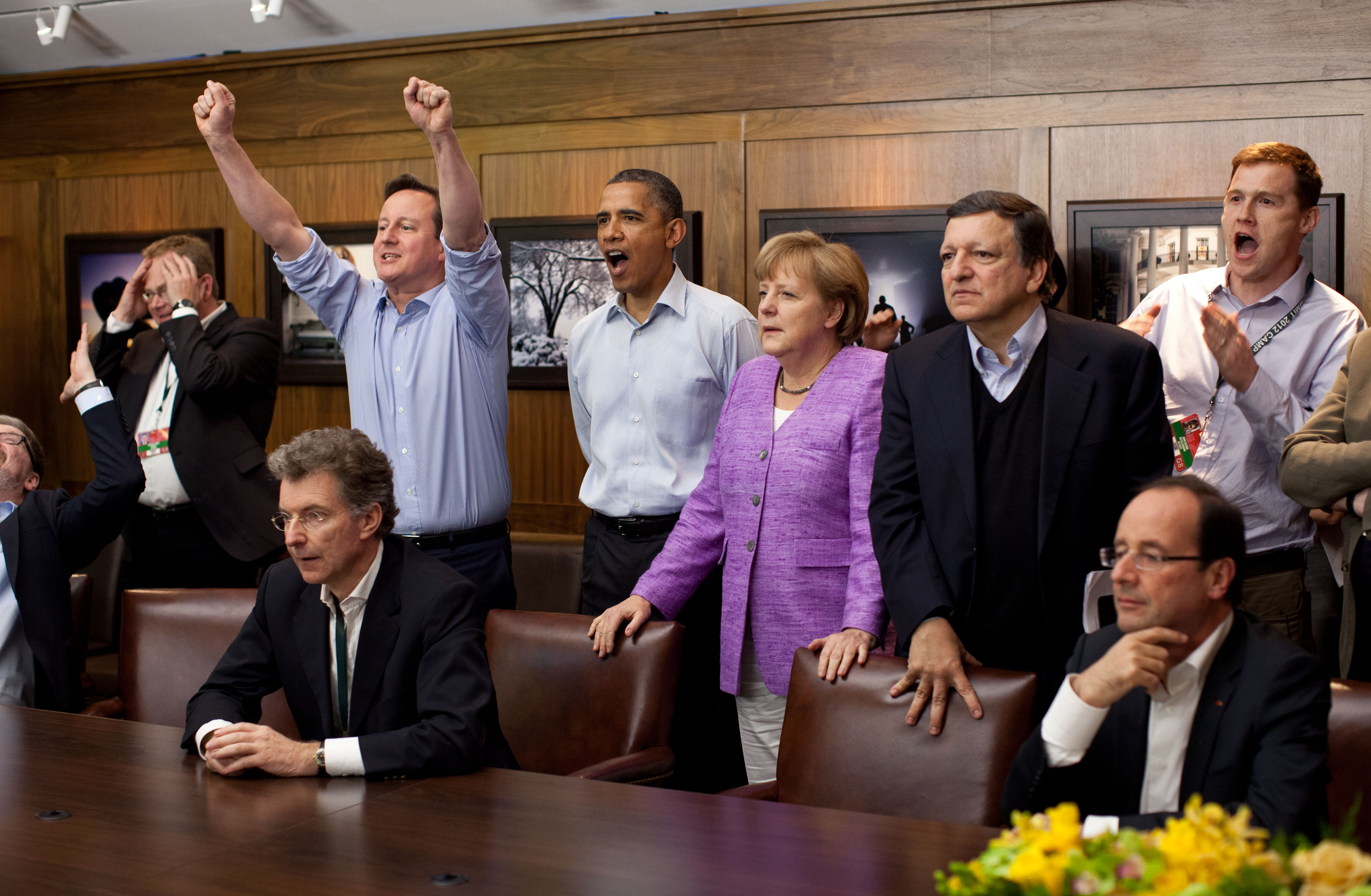
David Cameron, Barack Obama, Angela Merkel, José Manuel Barroso, François Hollande, and others watching the overtime shootout of the Chelsea (England) vs. Bayern Munich (Germany) Champions League final. Cameron's elation with the penalty shootout (United Kingdom) and Merkel's look of utter dismay (Germany) reflect the outcome of the match, which was won by Chelsea on penalties.

The attendees include the eight core participants who make up the G8, as well as the European Union which is represented within the G8 but cannot host or chair summits. A number of other national leaders are also traditionally invited to attend the summit and to participate in some G8 summit activities, but none were invited this year.

Russian President Vladimir Putin announced that he would not be attending the summit because he was "busy," amid concerns about the discord between Russia–United States relations. However, according to his economic aide Arkady Dvorkovich, Russia's participation would be "absolutely full-fledged" due to Prime Minister Dmitry Medvedev's "huge experience working" at such events. Media speculation also arose that Putin was timing his first foreign visit since being re-elected for a visit to China to attend the Shanghai Cooperation Organisation summit.

The 38th G8 summit was the first summit for French President François Hollande and was the last summit for Dmitry Medvedev as the leader of Russia. It was also the first and only summit for Italian Prime Minister Mario Monti and Japanese Prime Minister Yoshihiko Noda.

=== Participants ===
These summit participants represent the current core members:

**Core G8 members** Host state and leader are shown in bold text.
| Member | | Represented by | Title |
| (Canada) | Canada | Stephen Harper | Prime Minister |
| (France) | France | François Hollande | President |
| (Germany) | Germany | Angela Merkel | Chancellor |
| (Italy) | Italy | Mario Monti | Prime Minister |
| (Japan) | Japan | Yoshihiko Noda | Prime Minister |
| (Russia) | Russia | Dmitry Medvedev | Prime Minister |
| (United Kingdom) | United Kingdom | David Cameron | Prime Minister |
| (United States) | **United States** | **Barack Obama** | **President** |
| (European Union) | European Union | José Manuel Barroso | Commission President |
| (European Union) | European Union | Herman Van Rompuy | Council President |

== Priorities ==
The summit was intended as a venue for resolving differences among its members. As a practical matter, the summit was also conceived as an opportunity for its members to give each other mutual encouragement.

Traditionally, the host country of the G8 summit sets the agenda for negotiations, which take place primarily amongst multi-national civil servants known informally as "sherpas". Effective organization at the sherpa level is understood to be essential for the success of a summit meeting.

Food security is anticipated as a priority with thematic follow-through in G8, G20, and other international venues. As context, the emphasis on agriculture and food security at the L’Aquila summit resulted in pledges, and these pledges included multi-year follow-up by G8 members.

In 2010, France announced plans to "prepare far upstream" for African outreach.

== Schedule and agenda ==
A tentative agenda for the 38th G8 summit included some issues which remain unresolved from previous summits. For example, leaders at the G8 summit in L’Aquila supported post-2012 plans for accelerating emissions reductions in aviation. Other issues were the effort to tackle a global hunger crisis and the European sovereign debt crisis, particularly following the fall of talks to form a Greek government following an election.

In 2010, strategic plans for lobbying summit organizers were tentatively in place. The United States was challenged to deliver "workmanlike summits that include China, India and other emerging powers as full partners."

=== Discussed topics ===
The main topic of the G8 summit was the European sovereign debt crisis, particularly following the fall of talks to form a Greek government following an election. Obama told the press: "There is now an emerging consensus that more must be done to promote growth and job creation right now in the context of these fiscal and structural reforms." In its declaration the G8 agreed "that all of our governments need to take actions to boost confidence and nurture recovery including reforms to raise productivity, growth and demand within a sustainable, credible and non-inflationary macroeconomic framework. We commit to fiscal responsibility and, in this context, we support sound and sustainable fiscal consolidation policies that take into account countries' evolving economic conditions and underpin confidence and economic recovery." The G8 leaders also stated in the declaration that they agreed on the importance of a strong and cohesive eurozone for global stability and recovery, and affirmed their interest in Greece remaining in the eurozone while respecting its commitments. However disagreement over economic growth favored by France's president François Hollande and fiscal responsibility favored by Germany's chancellor Angela Merkel is also reflected in the G8 summit declaration where the G8 members stated "The global economic recovery shows signs of promise, but significant headwinds persist. Against this background, we commit to take all necessary steps to strengthen and reinvigorate our economies and combat financial stresses, recognizing that the right measures are not the same for each of us."

During their first meeting the G8 leaders discussed the nuclear program of Iran, North Korea's nuclear ambitions, and the violent internal conflict in Syria. They agreed that Iran must prove that its nuclear programme is peaceful and that North Korea will be further isolated if it "continues down the path of provocation". There were consensus among the G8 that the Kofi Annan peace plan for Syria must be fully implemented. The G8 also discussed the political transition in Burma. In this context President Obama said: "On a brighter note, we had the opportunity to discuss Burma, and all of us are hopeful that the political process and transition and transformation that is beginning to take place there takes root."

The G8 states committed themselves to a New Alliance for Food Security and Nutrition with African leaders and the private sector whose target it is to lift 50 million people from poverty within 10 years. By this alliance, the G8 wanted to "accelerate the flow of private capital to African agriculture, take to scale new technologies and other innovations that can increase sustainable agricultural productivity, and reduce the risk borne by vulnerable economies and communities." The G8 leaders also discussed a broad release of national oil reserves to steady shaky energy markets when sanctions against Iran began on 28 July 2012 respectively when an oil embargo against Iran by the European Union went into effect on 1 July 2012.

=== Bilateral meetings ===
UK Prime Minister David Cameron was scheduled to meet with Hollande on the sidelines of the summit. Obama held bilateral meetings with Cameron and Merkel.

== Controversy ==
=== Protesters and demonstrations ===
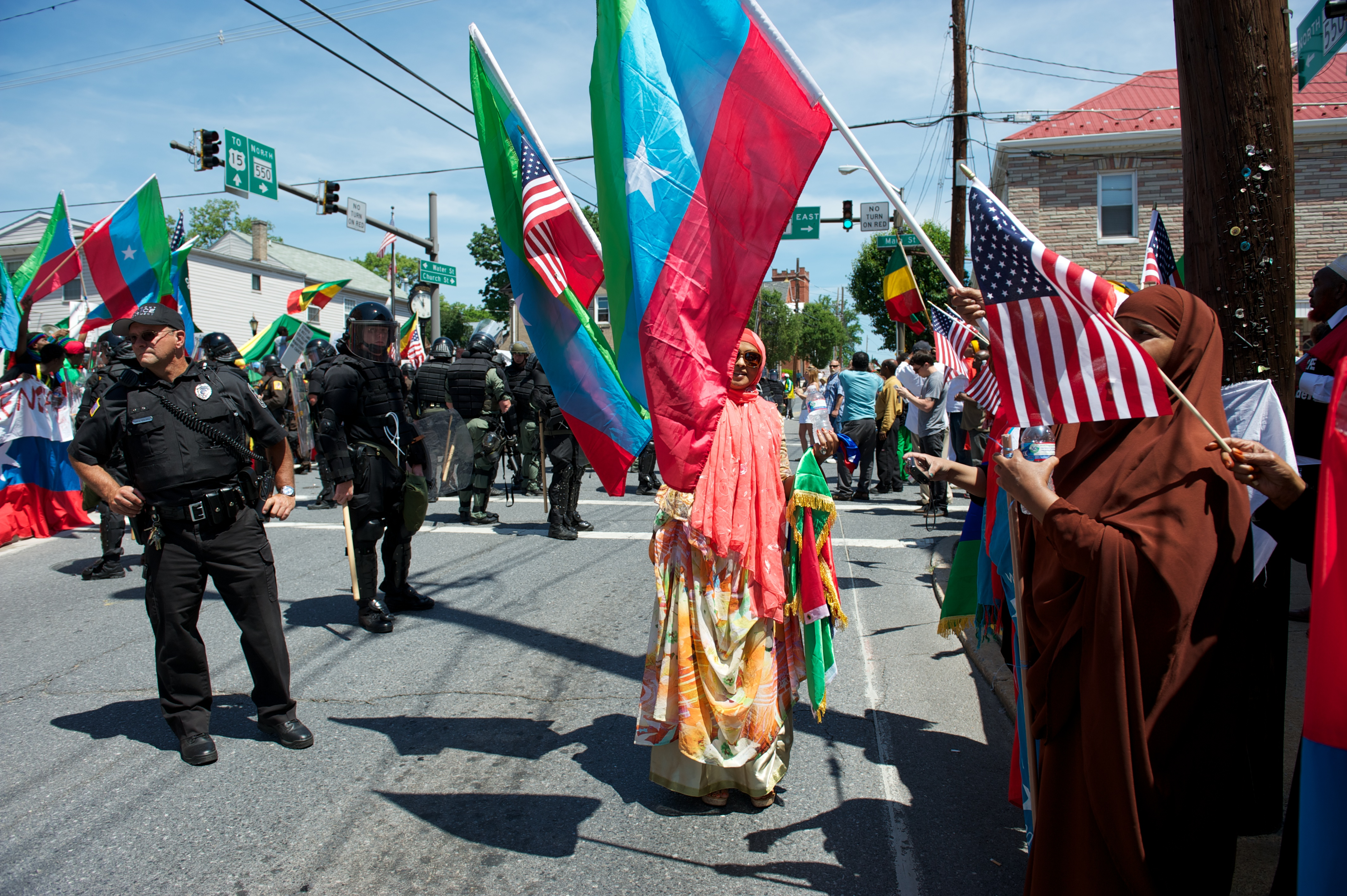
Protesters in Thurmont, Maryland

Protest groups and other activists were expected to make a strong showing at the summit in Chicago. Adbusters, an organization that helped initiate Occupy Wall Street, had called for a mass occupation of Chicago starting on 1 May, before the venue was changed to the much less accessible Camp David. This call has the potential to bring together the newer US-focused Occupy movement with the ongoing anti-globalization movement.

About 150 protesters met in Thurmont, MD on 19 May. Your4State, a news station local to the area, said that the Thurmont Police were "preparing for the traffic and protesters" and that "their ten-member police force will grow." The protests in Thurmont were non-violent and around 30 of the protesters were allowed to stay at a local farm. Cozy, a local Inn, sold all of its rooms to journalists.

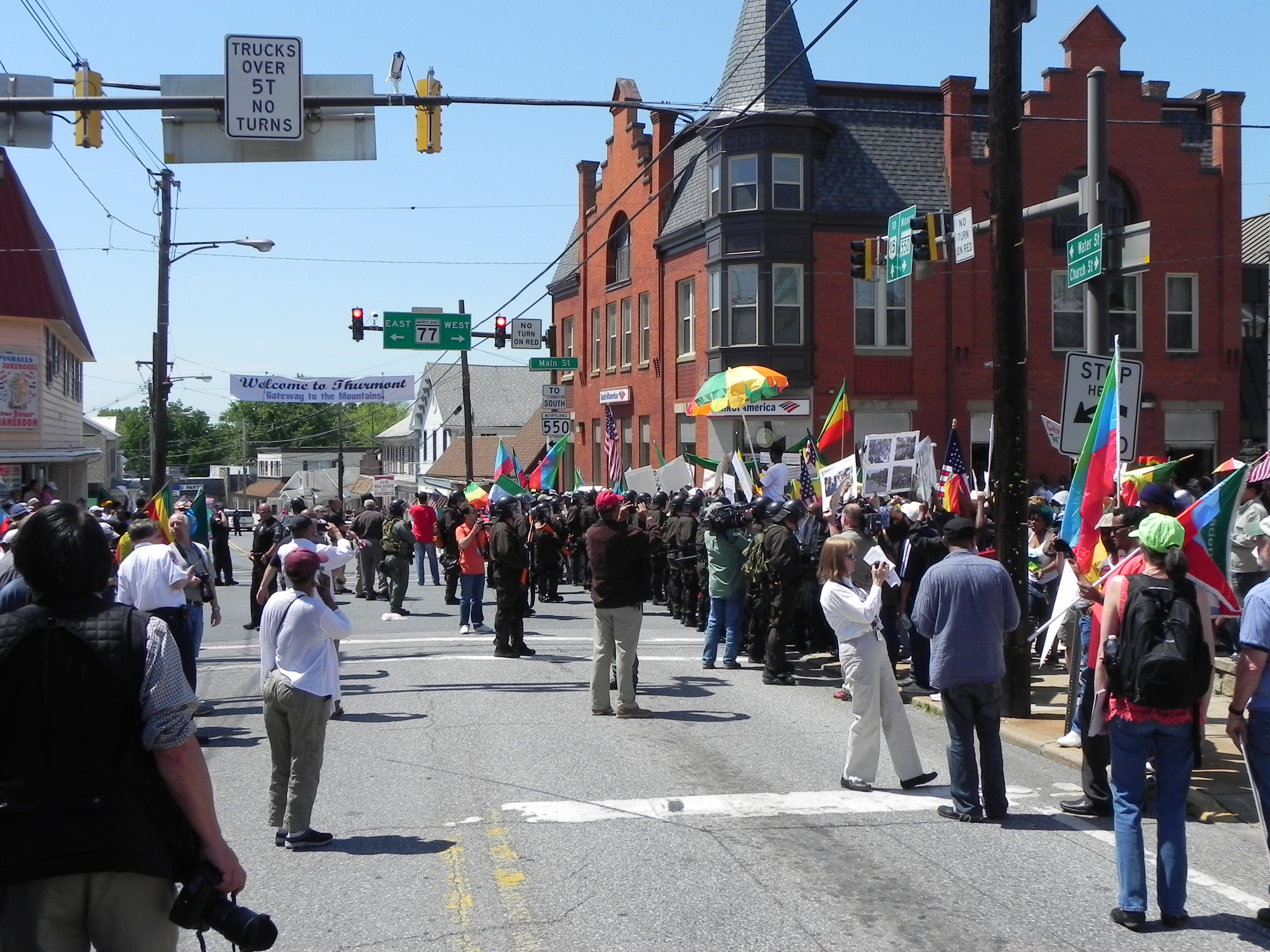
Protesters in Thurmont, Maryland during the 2012 G8 Summit, hosted at nearby Camp David

=== New ordinances ===
Chicago Mayor Rahm Emanuel proposed a set of ordinances to prepare for protests during the summit in Chicago before the summit was moved to Camp David. Though Emanuel initially stated that these ordinances would apply only during the summit, he later acknowledged that they would be permanent.

- Authorization for the Mayor to purchase and deploy surveillance cameras throughout the city, without any type of oversight
- Restrictions on public activity, including amplified sound and morning gatherings
- Restrictions on parades, including the requirement to purchase an insurance policy worth $1 million and to register every sign or banner that will be held by more than one person
- The power to deputize many different types of law enforcement personnel other than the Chicago Police Department

These new ordinances drew protests from the ACLU, Amnesty International, the Occupy Movement (particularly Occupy Chicago), and the anti-abortion movement.

== Gallery of participating leaders ==
=== Core G8 participants ===
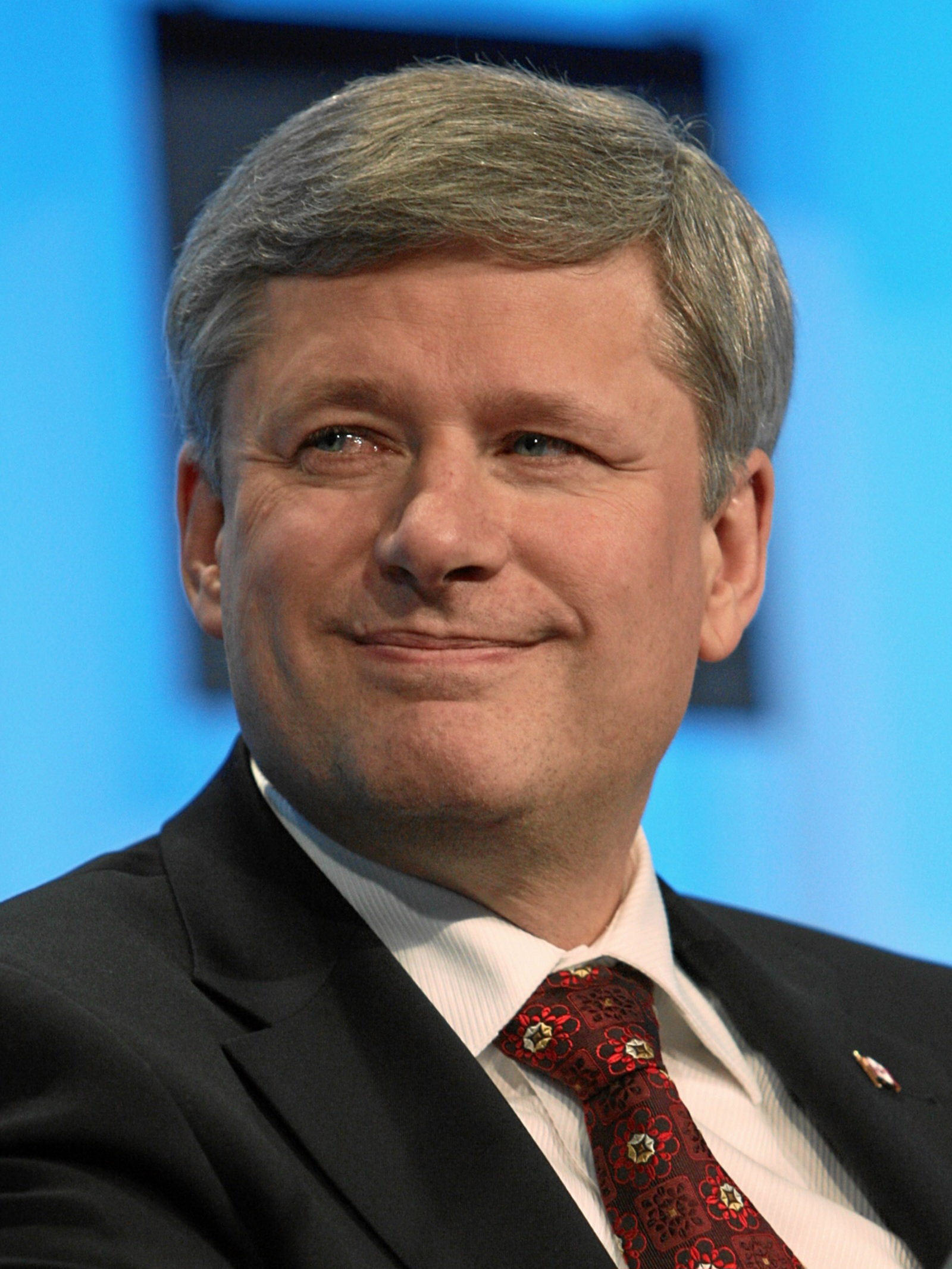
(Canada) Canada
Stephen Harper,
Prime Minister

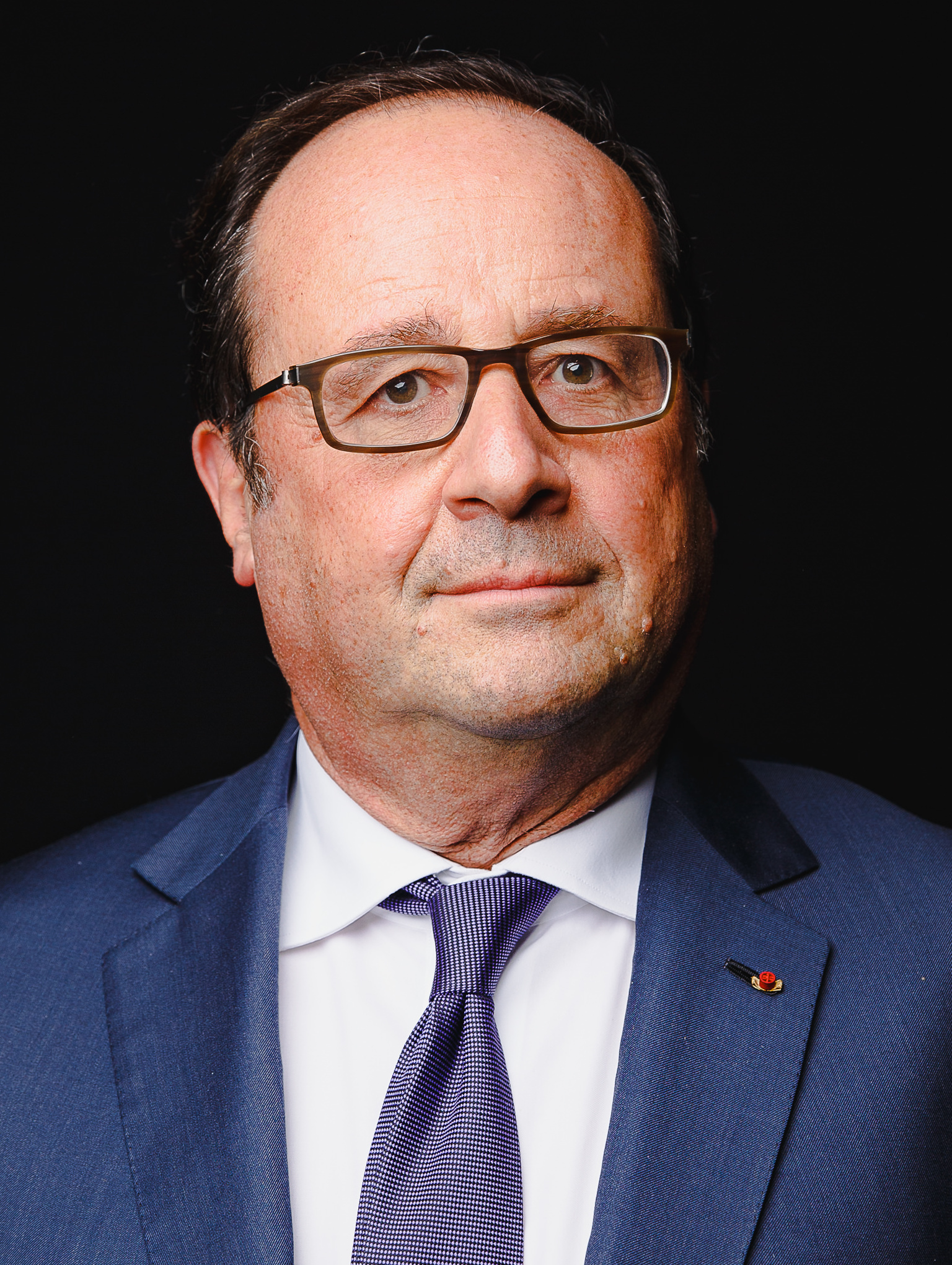
(France) France
François Hollande,
President

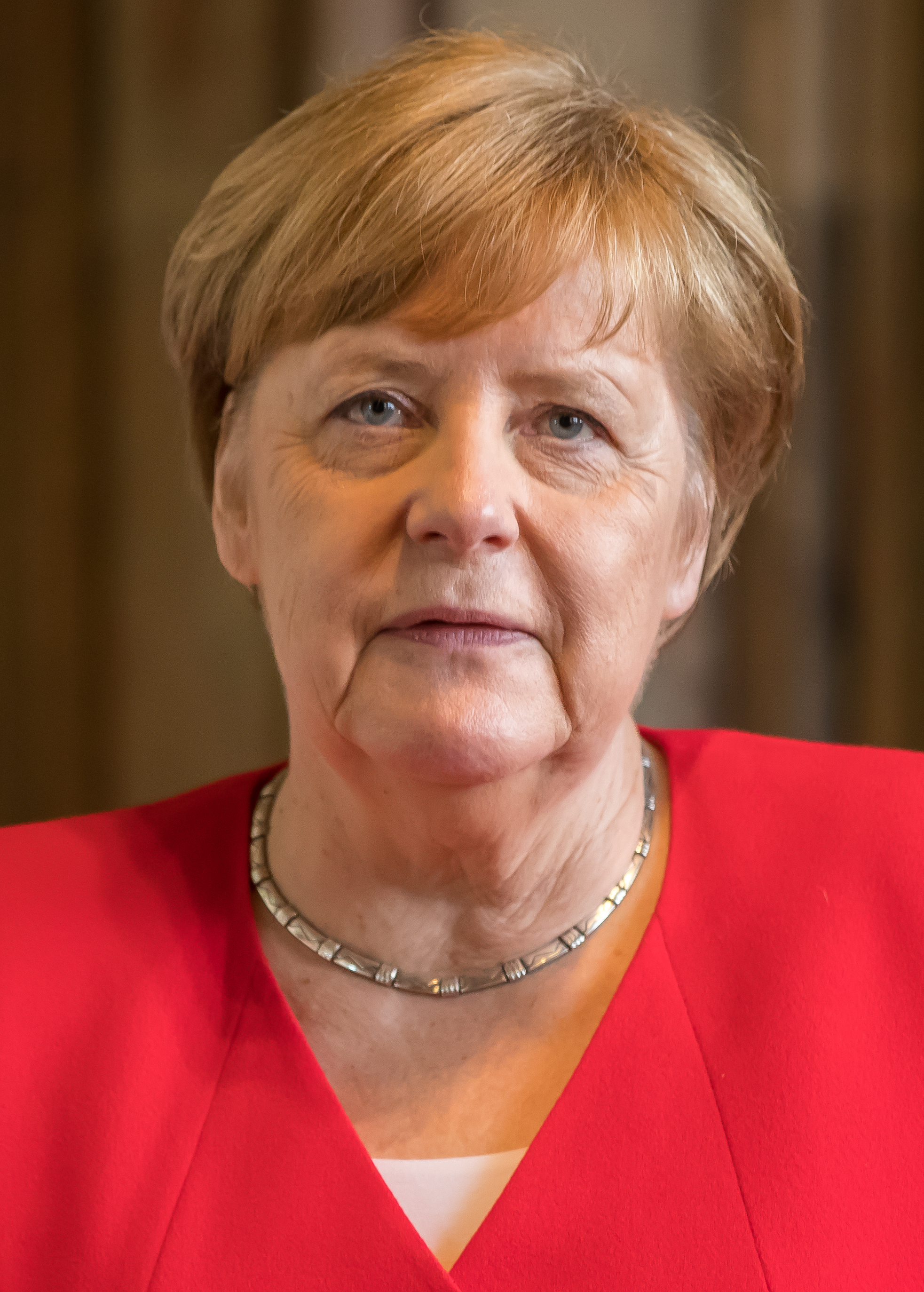
(Germany) Germany
Angela Merkel,
Chancellor

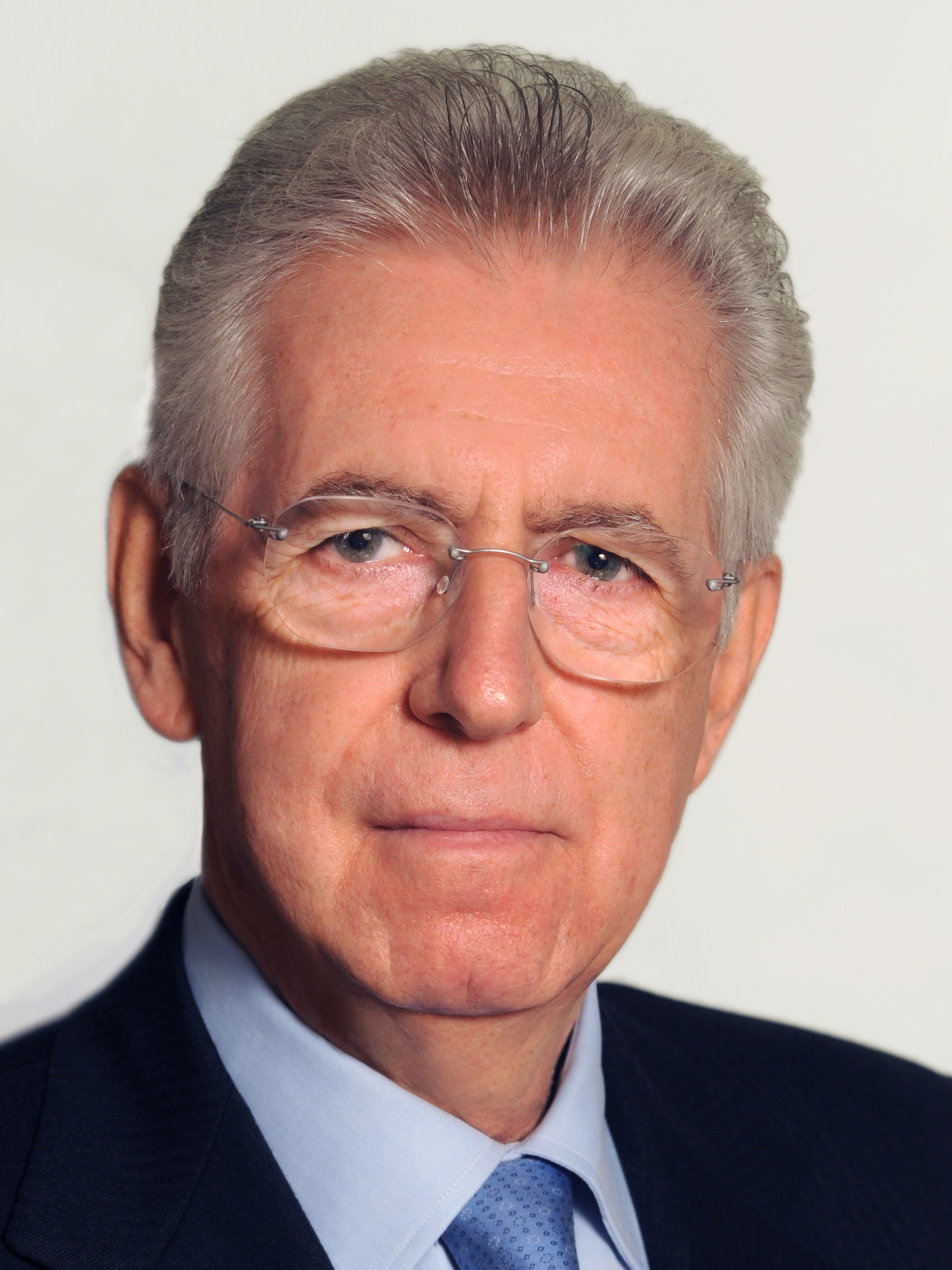
(Italy) Italy
Mario Monti,
Prime Minister

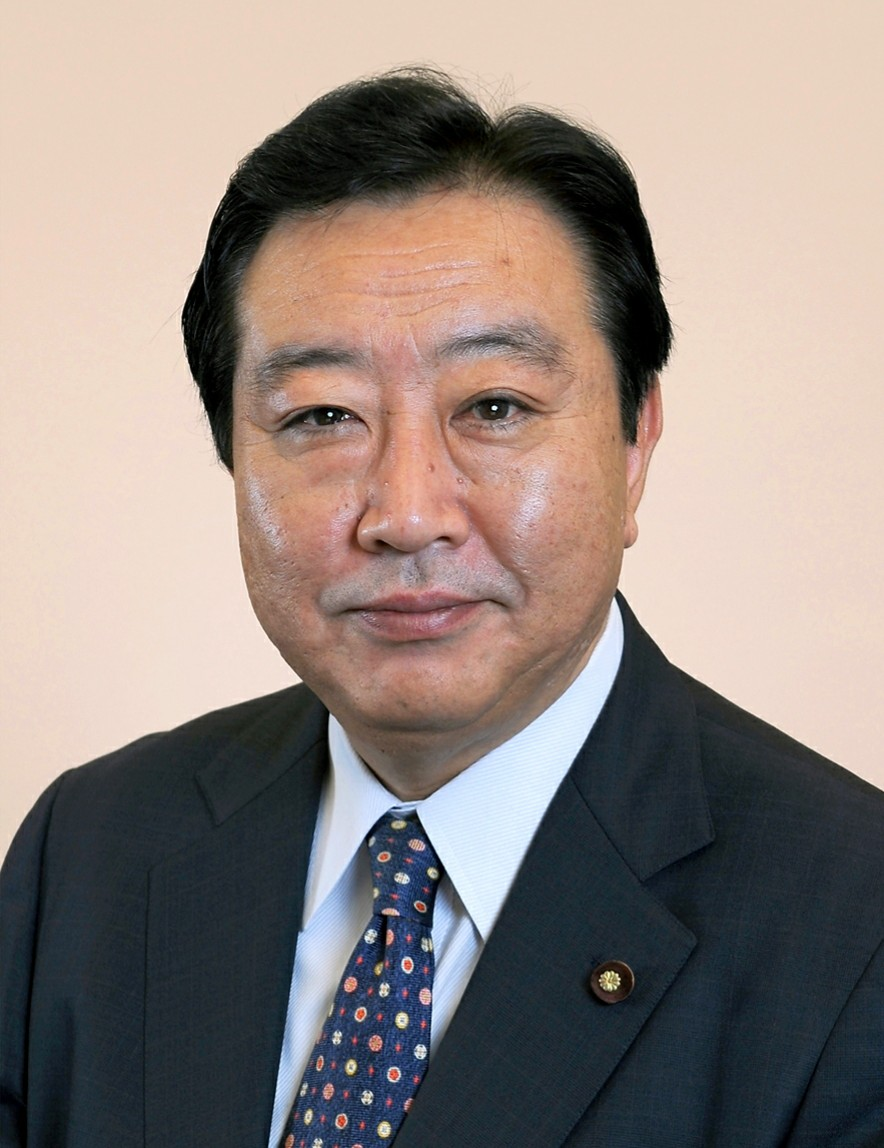
(Japan) Japan
Yoshihiko Noda,
Prime Minister

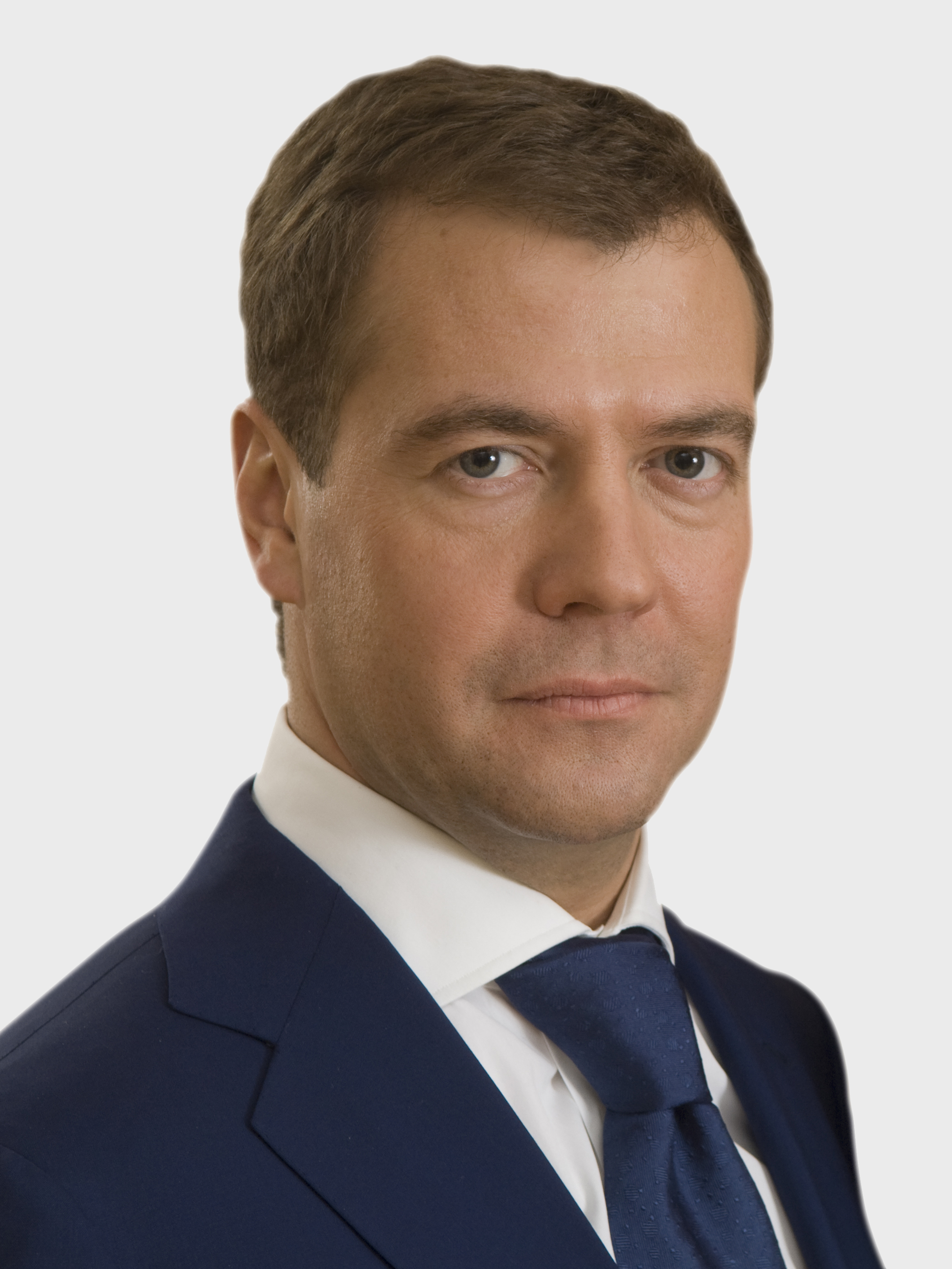
(Russia) Russia
Dmitry Medvedev,
Prime Minister

(United Kingdom) United Kingdom
David Cameron,
Prime Minister

(United States) United States
Barack Obama,
President (Host)
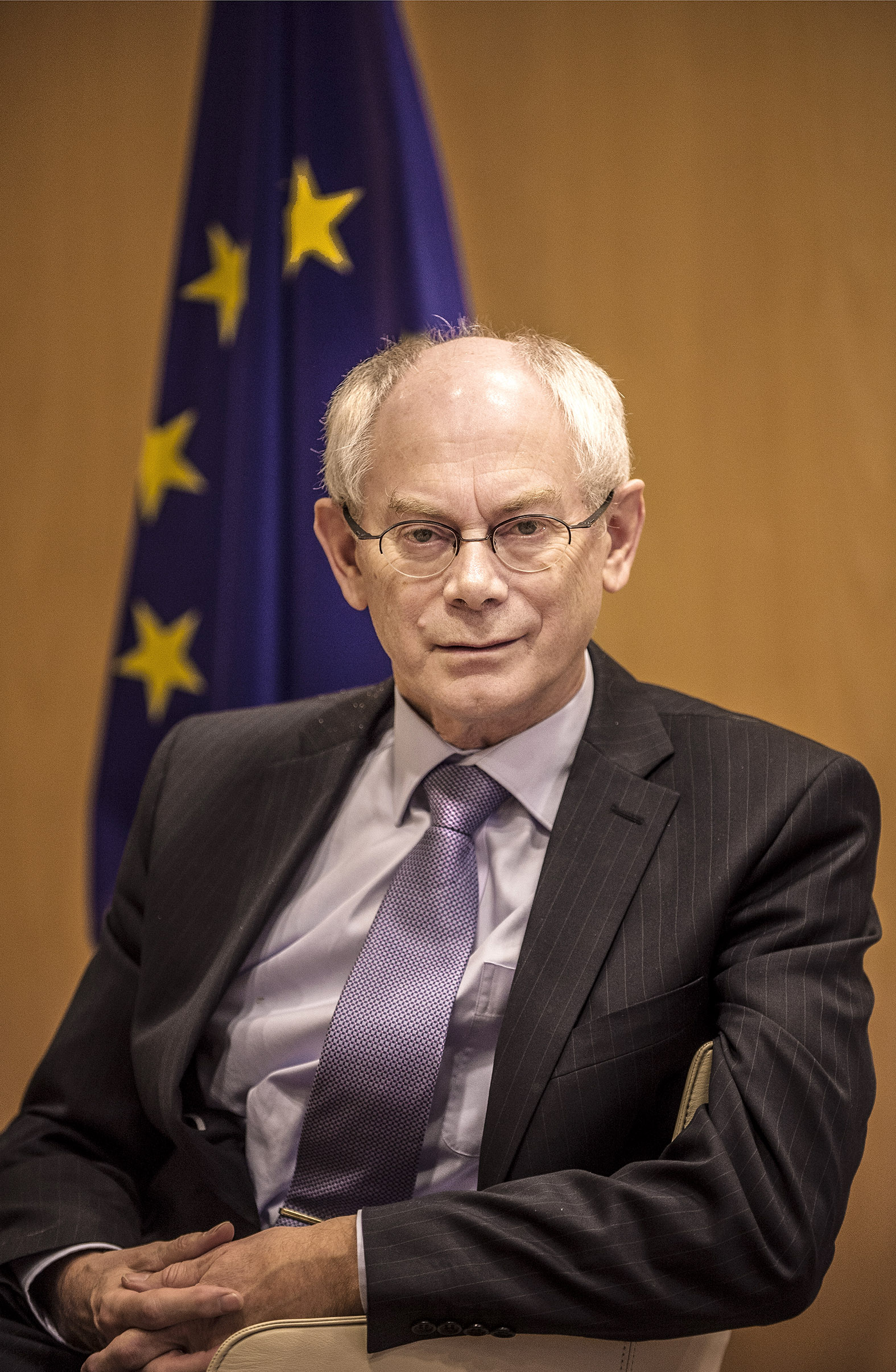
(European Union) European Union
Herman Van Rompuy,
Council President

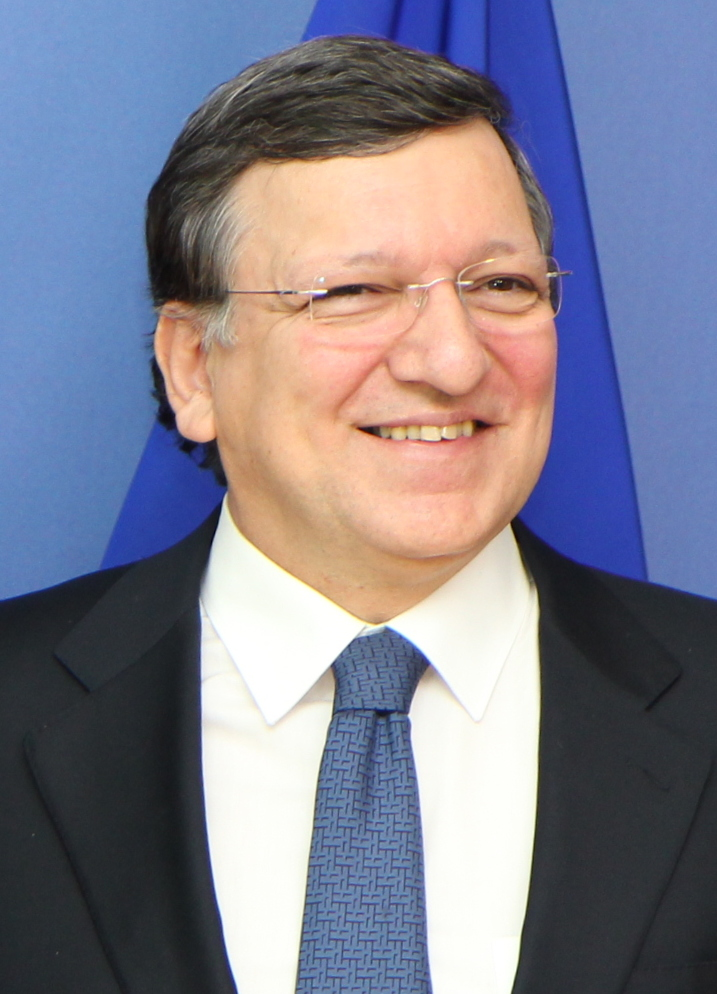
(European Union) European Union
José Manuel Barroso,
Commission President

== See also ==
- Intergovernmental Panel on Climate Change
- United Nations Framework Convention on Climate Change
