= Orange One =

U.S. Navy-operated facility located under Camp David

- Near Thurmont, Maryland, in United States

Location
- Coordinates: 39.6472°N 77.4625°W

Orange One is a U.S. Navy–operated facility located in the Appalachian Mountains, extending underneath Camp David, the U.S. President's country retreat. Described in one account as a "fortress", it was designed for use by the president as a military headquarters during an emergency.

== Design ==
According to the diary of British Prime Minister Harold Macmillan, who toured the facility in 1959, Orange One can house a staff of 200 persons in two separate wings and is a "fortress ... hewn out of the rock". Bill Gulley has said Orange One can be reached by an elevator from Aspen Lodge, the president's quarters at Camp David, and that part of Orange One extends underneath the Aspen Lodge swimming pool. Gulley noted that, as of the mid 1970s, Orange One was no longer considered a primary command and control facility as its communications systems had not, at that time, been improved and it had not been updated to withstand attack by certain categories of weapons.

== History ==
Orange One was first visited by a sitting president in the 1950s when Dwight D. Eisenhower inspected the facility while leading the exercise Operation Alert. In April 1961, then-former president Eisenhower returned to Camp David for consultations with John F. Kennedy on the failed Bay of Pigs invasion. According to former Associated Press reporter Dale Nelson, Kennedy inspected Orange One following Eisenhower's departure before helicoptering to his private estate, Glen Ora, in Middleburg, Virginia.

The existence of Orange One came to public light in the 1970s, during the Watergate scandal, after it was revealed that Richard Nixon's choice of location for an outdoor swimming pool at Aspen Lodge sat over a portion of the subterranean Orange One. This necessitated the construction of an above-ground pool, landscaped to appear in-ground.

== See also ==
- Site R—located near Orange One, houses the Alternate National Military Command Center
- Tagansky Protected Command Point—a Cold War-era Soviet government leadership facility
- Wolf's Lair—a World War II–era German government leadership facility
