= Catoctin Colorfest =

Craft festival in Thurmont, Maryland, US

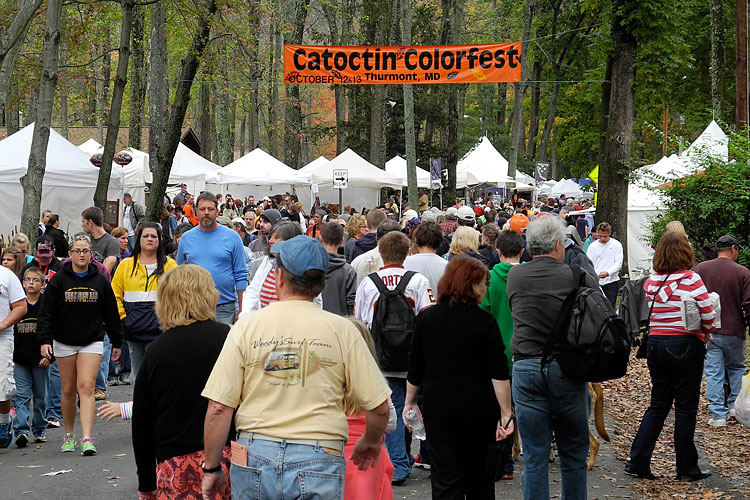
- A photo of Catoctin Colorfest 2013 taken near the front entrance to the town park.
- Begins: Second Saturday in October
- Ends: Second Sunday in October
- Frequency: Annually
- Locations: Thurmont, Maryland
- Years active: 63
- Founder: Duncan Burchard, John Brown
- Most recent: 12–13 October 2024
- Next event: 11–12 October 2025
- Attendance: 125,000
- Organiser: Colorfest, Inc.
- Website: Catoctin Colorfest

Catoctin Colorfest is an annual arts and crafts festival in Thurmont, Maryland. Every year about 125,000 people attend, making it one of the largest festivals of its kind on the east coast of the United States. In 2005 Colorfest was recognized as one of the top 35 arts and craft shows in the United States by Sunshine Artists Magazine. In 2013 about 250 vendors participated in Colorfest. The event is free to attend, but parking costs a fee. The festival takes place the second weekend of October each year. During Colorfest a free shuttlebus service is provided to get to and from the parking areas. The event takes the entire year to plan.

== History ==
Colorfest began in 1963 as a nature walk, but would eventually become a juried arts and crafts festival. The walk was originally organized by either Duncan Burchard, a local naturalist, or John Brown, another Thurmont local. Between 1968 and 1971 the other festivities were added to the walk, which now drew in 30,000 people. In the year 1973 craftspeople, who set up their stands at the carnival grounds and in the community park, were invited to the festival for the first time. The 1973 event was planned by the Catoctin Mountain Tourist Council with the help of volunteers. In 1974 officers were elected for the first time to organise Colorfest. By 1975 the event was drawing in over 75,000 people. The year 1976 was notable for a bad flood on Saturday, which according to American Towns, almost ruined the event. The rain stopped on Sunday and the event was a success in the end.

In 1979 Beverly Zienda was elected president of the Colorfest, a job she would hold for 29 years until her death in 2008 when she died from breast cancer. Her husband is quoted as saying that, "she was practically running that Colorfest from her hospital bed." In November 1977 Colorfest held their inaugural Catoctin Colorfest dinner meeting. In 1980 craftspeople were invited to set up their stands in the area in front of Thurmont Middle School. By 1988 over 350 vendors participated in Colorfest. In 2008 the festival began to offer recycling bins for the first time. As of 2013 the president of the Colorfest committee is Carol Robertson who took up the position after Beverly Zienda's death.

2020 saw the COVID-19 pandemic as grounds for cancellation. The 58th was deferred to 2021.

== Fundraising ==
In 1983 Colorfest became successful enough that the Colorfest committee turned a profit. Every year since then they have donated the proceeds of the event to local organisations. Much of the money raised from parking and vendor fees is used to support local scholarships and projects with over $140,000 having been given out in Scholarships to graduates of Catoctin High School. Colorfest weekend is one of the biggest fundraising weekend for many charities in the area. Colorfest Inc. regularly donates to the local Guardian Hose Fire Company, Frederick County Public Libraries, and the Frederick Food Bank. The Frederick Food Bank received $13,000 from Colorfest Inc. between 2011 and 2013. A number of churches, along with the Thurmont Community Ambulance Company, consider Colorfest to be their biggest fundraiser of the year.
