= Camp Greentop =

Historic district in Maryland, United States

- Camp Greentop Historic District
- U.S. National Register of Historic Places
- U.S. Historic district
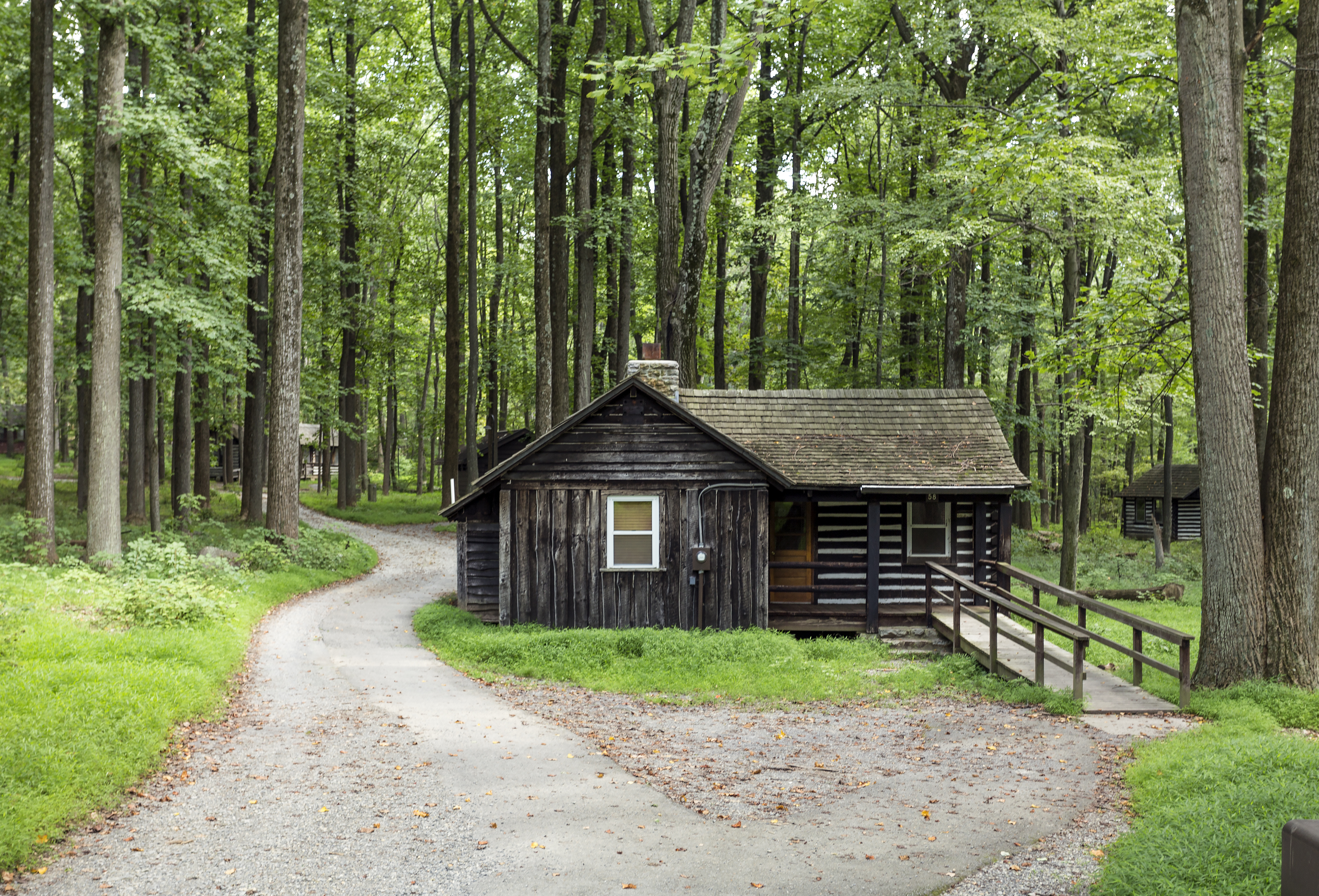
- Greentop cabin in 2016

- Location within Maryland Location within the United States
- Location: Park Central Road, Thurmont, Maryland
- Coordinates: 39°38′39″N 77°28′35″W
- Area: 40 acres (16 ha)
- Built: 1938
- Architect: WPA; NPS
- Architectural style: NPS rustic architecture
- MPS: ECW Architecture in Catoctin Mountain Park MPS
- NRHP reference No.: 89001583
- Added to NRHP: October 11, 1989

Camp Greentop is located in Catoctin Mountain Park near Thurmont, Maryland. The camp was built by the Works Progress Administration labor program in the development of what was then known as the Catoctin Mountain Recreational Demonstration Area, and comprises 22 rustic log buildings including sleeping cabins, administrative buildings and lodges. All were built between 1934 and 1938. The buildings are a simplified version of the National Park Service Rustic style. The camp was originally to duplicate the design of Camp Misty Mount, but was modified during construction for use by the Baltimore League for Crippled Children, making it one of the first handicap-accessible facilities in the United States. "From 1957 through 1996, every student in Frederick County enjoyed the opportunity to make a national park their school". Students stayed in the cabins while taking advantage of this outdoor school as part of Frederick County's Outdoor School program.

The camp was designed to accommodate 150 people, organized into units of 30. As a matter of policy, a swimming pool was provided, as no natural alternative existed. The cabins with siding exteriors used "waney board" siding, with boards cut from untrimmed logs, resulting in irregular, wavy or "waney" edges. The design modifications at Greentop to accommodate handicapped children reduced capacity to 98.

Greentop is also known as Camp 2: Camp 1 is Camp Misty Mount and Camp 3, originally called Camp Hi-Catoctin and located at a much higher elevation, became Camp David.

Camp Greentop Historic District was listed on the National Register of Historic Places in 1989.
