= Camp David =

Country retreat of the US president

Camp David Naval Support Facility Thurmont
- Catoctin Mountain Park; Frederick County, Maryland in the United States
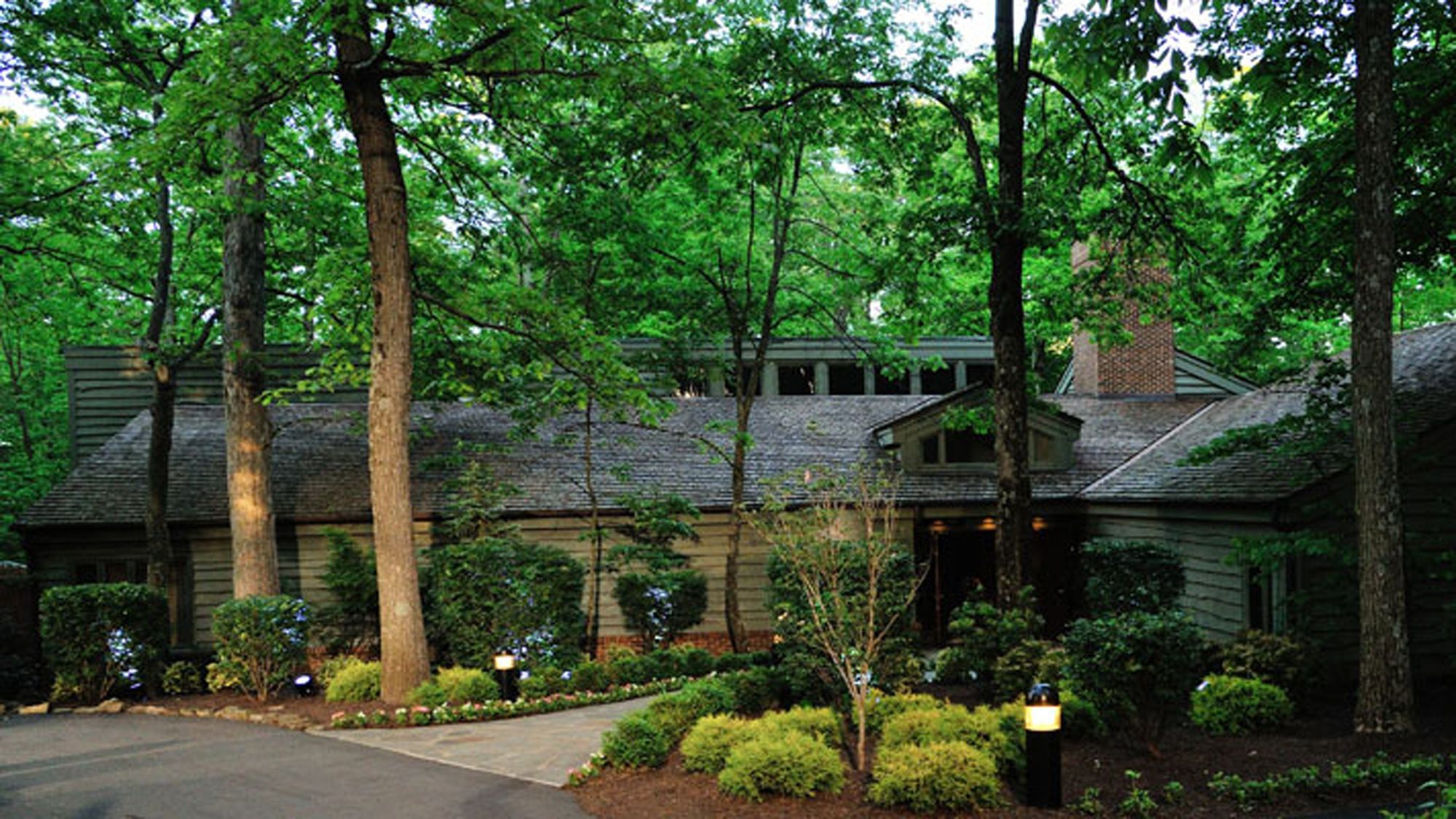
- The main lodge in 2012

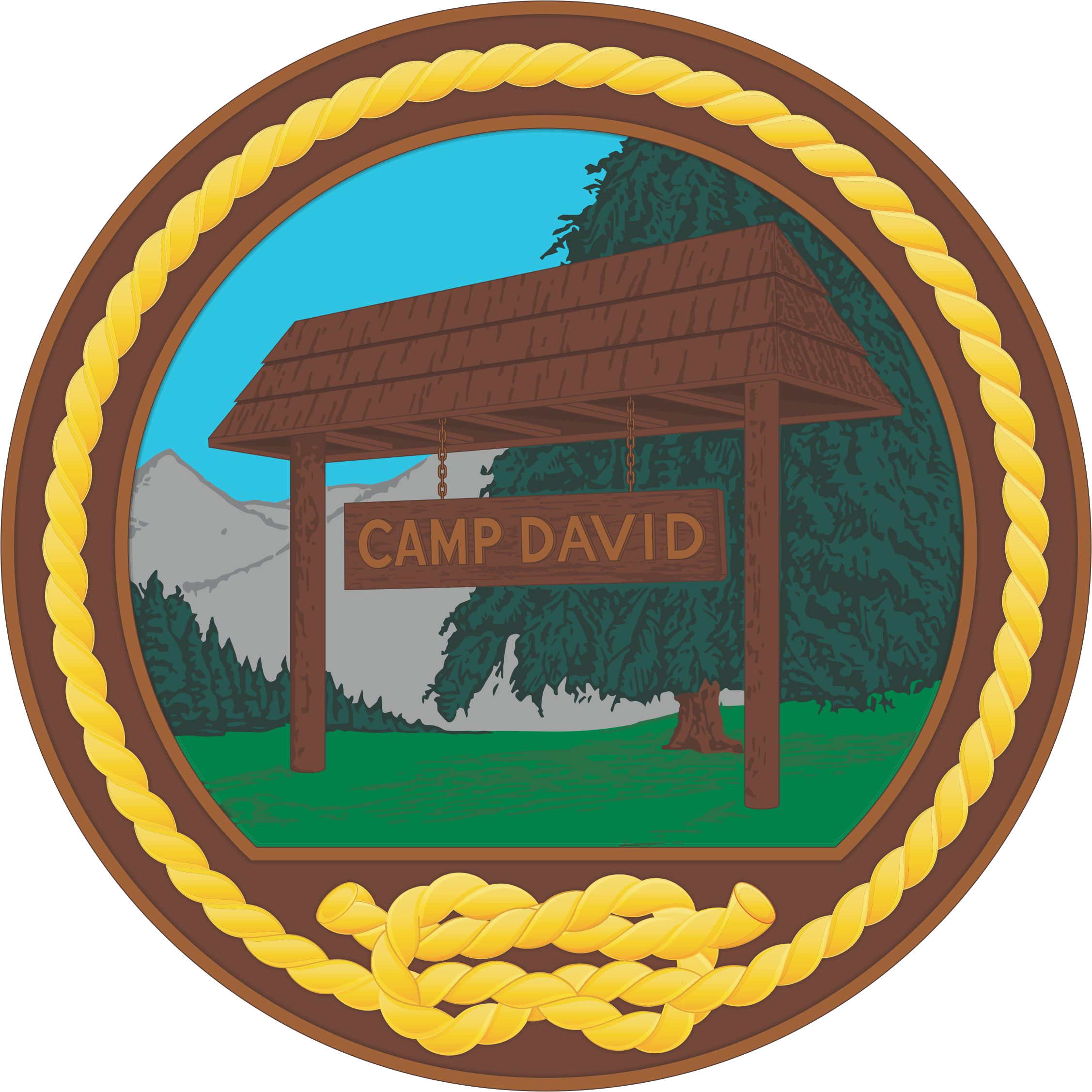

Site information
- Type: Presidential country retreat
- Owner: Department of Defense
- Operator: US Navy
- Controlled by: Naval District Washington
- Open to the public: No
- Website: Official website

Location
- Location in Maryland Location in the United States
- Coordinates: 39°38′54″N 77°27′54″W

Site history
- Built: 1935–1938
- Built by: Works Progress Administration
- In use: 1938–present
- Events: Camp David Accords (1978); Camp David Summit (2000); 38th G8 summit (2012); ~~46th G7 summit~~ (2020, cancelled)

Garrison information
- Current commander: Commander Craig Culbertson
- Occupants: President of the United States and the First Family

Camp David is a 125-acre (51-hectare) country retreat for the president of the United States. It lies in the wooded hills of Catoctin Mountain Park, in Frederick County, Maryland, near the towns of Thurmont and Emmitsburg, about 62 miles (100 kilometers) north-northwest of Washington, D.C. It is officially named Naval Support Facility Thurmont. Technically a military installation, it is staffed primarily by the Seabees, the Civil Engineer Corps (CEC), the United States Navy, and the United States Marine Corps. Naval construction battalions are tasked with Camp David construction and send detachments as needed.

Originally known as Hi-Catoctin, Camp David was built as a retreat for federal government agents and their families by the Works Progress Administration. Construction started in 1935 and was completed in 1938. In 1942, President Franklin D. Roosevelt converted it to a presidential retreat and renamed it "Shangri-La", after the fictional Himalayan paradise. Camp David received its present name in 1953 from President Dwight D. Eisenhower, in honor of his father and his grandson, both named David.

The Catoctin Mountain Park does not indicate the location of Camp David on park maps due to privacy and security concerns, although it can be seen through the use of publicly accessible satellite images, and is also viewable on certain public web mapping services like Google Maps.

== Presidential use ==
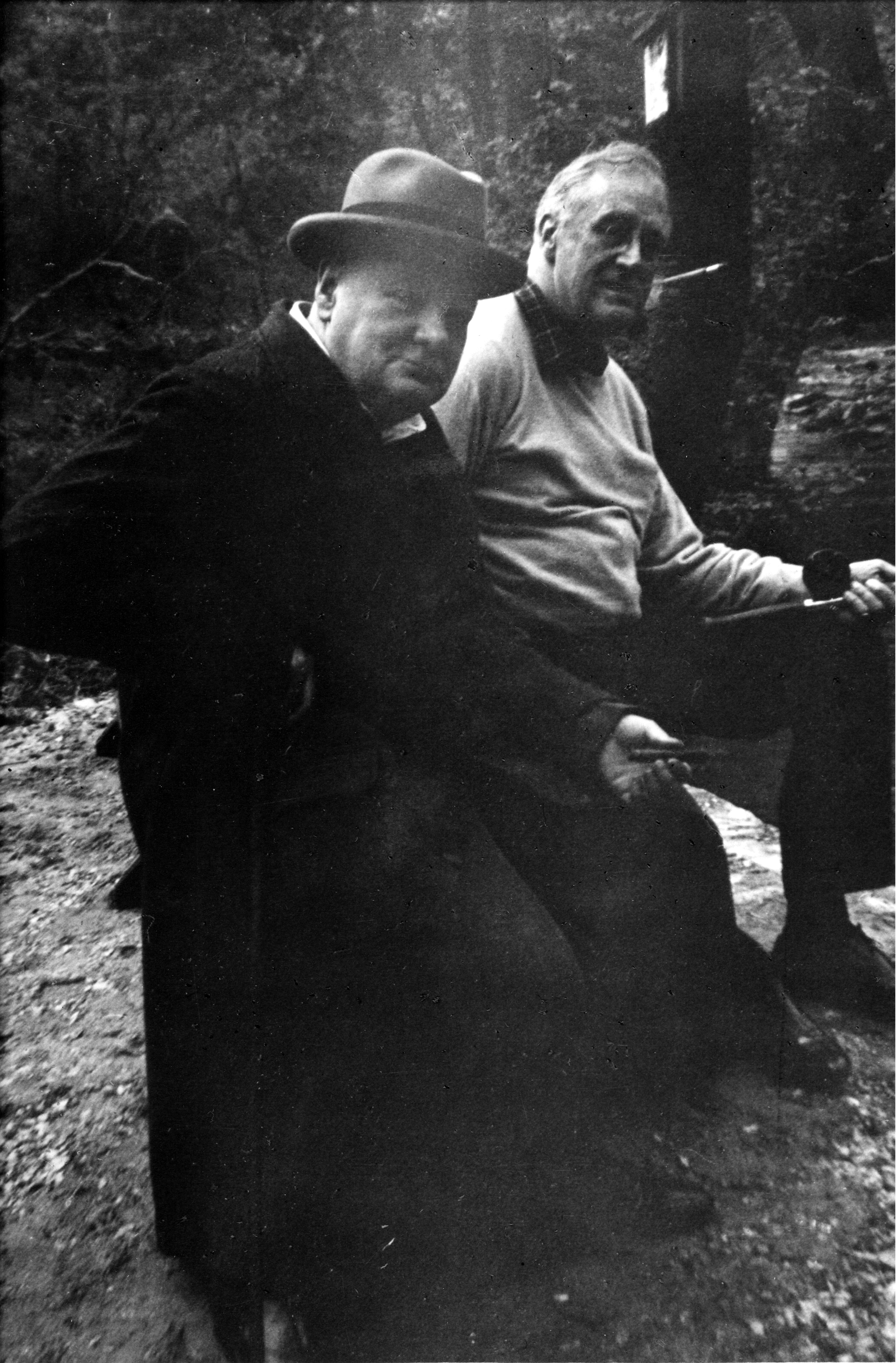
Winston Churchill and Franklin D. Roosevelt at Shangri-La, May 1943

Camp David has been used to host private diplomatic meetings with foreign leaders and heads of state since at least World War II. Franklin D. Roosevelt hosted Winston Churchill at Shangri-La in May 1943, during World War II. Dwight Eisenhower held his first post heart-attack cabinet meeting there on November 22, 1955, following hospitalization and convalescence he required after a heart attack suffered in Denver, Colorado, on September 24. Eisenhower met Nikita Khrushchev there for two days of discussions in September 1959.

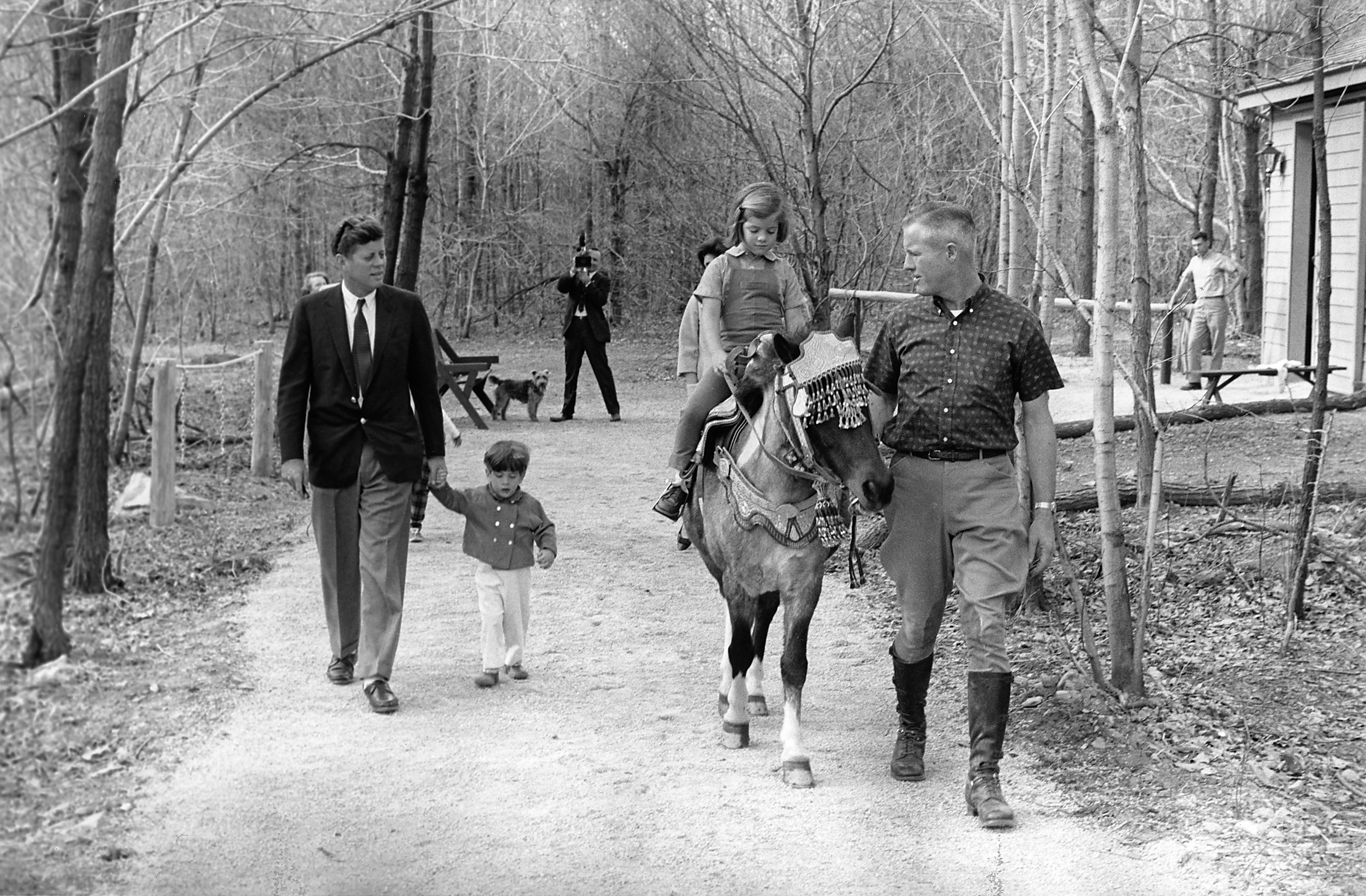
President Kennedy, John F. Kennedy Jr., Caroline Kennedy (riding "Tex"). Camp David, MD.

John F. Kennedy and his family often enjoyed riding and other recreational activities there, and Kennedy often allowed White House staff and Cabinet members to use the retreat when he or his family were not there. Lyndon B. Johnson met with advisors in this setting and hosted both Australian prime minister Harold Holt and Canadian prime minister Lester B. Pearson there. Richard Nixon was a frequent visitor. He personally directed the construction of a swimming pool and other improvements to Aspen Lodge. Gerald Ford hosted Indonesian president Suharto at Camp David.

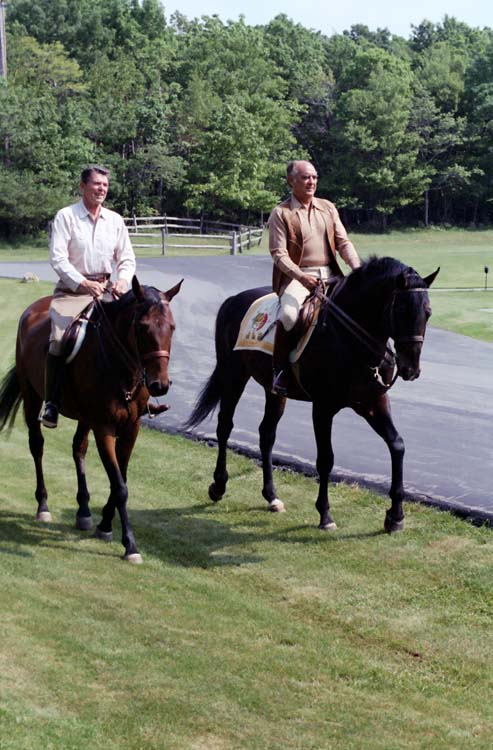
U.S. president Ronald Reagan (left) and Mexican president José López Portillo (right) riding horses in Camp David, Maryland

Jimmy Carter initially favored closing Camp David in order to save money, but once he visited the retreat, he decided to keep it. Carter brokered the Camp David Accords there in September 1978 between Egyptian president Anwar al-Sadat and Israeli prime minister Menachem Begin. Ronald Reagan visited the retreat more than any other president. In 1984, Reagan hosted British prime minister Margaret Thatcher. Reagan restored the nature trails that Nixon paved over so he could horseback ride at Camp David. George H. W. Bush's daughter, Dorothy Bush Koch, was married there in 1992, in the first wedding held at Camp David. During his tenure as president, Bill Clinton spent every Thanksgiving at Camp David with his family. In July 2000, he hosted the 2000 Camp David Summit negotiations between Israeli prime minister Ehud Barak and Palestinian Authority chairman Yasser Arafat there.

In February 2001, George W. Bush held his first meeting with a European leader, British prime minister Tony Blair, at Camp David, to discuss missile defense, Iraq, and NATO. After the September 11 attacks, Bush held a Cabinet meeting at Camp David to prepare the United States invasion of Afghanistan. During his two terms in office, Bush visited Camp David 149 times, for a total of 487 days, for hosting foreign visitors as well as a personal retreat. He met Blair there four times. Among the numerous other foreign leaders he hosted at Camp David were Russian president Vladimir Putin and President Musharraf of Pakistan in 2003, Danish prime minister Anders Fogh Rasmussen in June 2006, and British prime minister Gordon Brown in 2007.

Barack Obama chose Camp David to host the 38th G8 summit in 2012. President Obama also hosted Russian prime minister Dmitry Medvedev at Camp David, as well as the GCC Summit there in 2015.

Donald Trump hosted Senate majority leader Mitch McConnell and Speaker of the House Paul Ryan at Camp David while the Republican Party prepared to defend both houses of Congress in the 2018 midterm elections. Trump also planned to meet with the Taliban at Camp David to negotiate a peace agreement in 2019, but refrained after a suicide bombing in Kabul killed US troops. The 46th G7 summit was to be held at Camp David on June 10–12, 2020, but was cancelled due to health concerns during what was at the time considered the height of the COVID-19 pandemic.

Joe Biden hosted the U.S.–Japan–Korea Summit with Japanese prime minister Fumio Kishida and South Korean president Yoon Suk Yeol at Camp David in August 2023, resulting in the declaration of the Camp David Principles on trilateral relations between the U.S., Japan, and South Korea.

=== Count of visits by each president ===
Presidential visits to Camp David
| President | No. of visits | Years in office |
|---|---|---|
| Roosevelt | Unknown | 1933–1945 |
| Truman | 10 | 1945–1953 |
| Eisenhower | 45 | 1953–1961 |
| Kennedy | 19 | 1961–1963 |
| Johnson | 30 | 1963–1969 |
| Nixon | 160 | 1969–1974 |
| Ford | 29 | 1974–1977 |
| Carter | 99 | 1977–1981 |
| Reagan | 189 | 1981–1989 |
| G. H. W. Bush | 124 | 1989–1993 |
| Clinton | 60 | 1993–2001 |
| G. W. Bush | 150 | 2001–2009 |
| Obama | 39 | 2009–2017 |
| Trump | 15 (first term) | 2017–2021 |
| Trump | 4 (second term) | 2025–present |
| Biden | 39 | 2021–2025 |

== Practice golf facility ==
To be able to play his favorite sport, President Eisenhower had golf course architect Robert Trent Jones design a practice golf facility at Camp David. Around 1954, Jones built one golf hole—a par 3—with four different tees; Eisenhower added a 250-yard (230 m) driving range near the helicopter landing zone.

Jones modeled the green on those at two of Eisenhower's favorite courses, Augusta National and Burning Tree.

== Security incidents ==
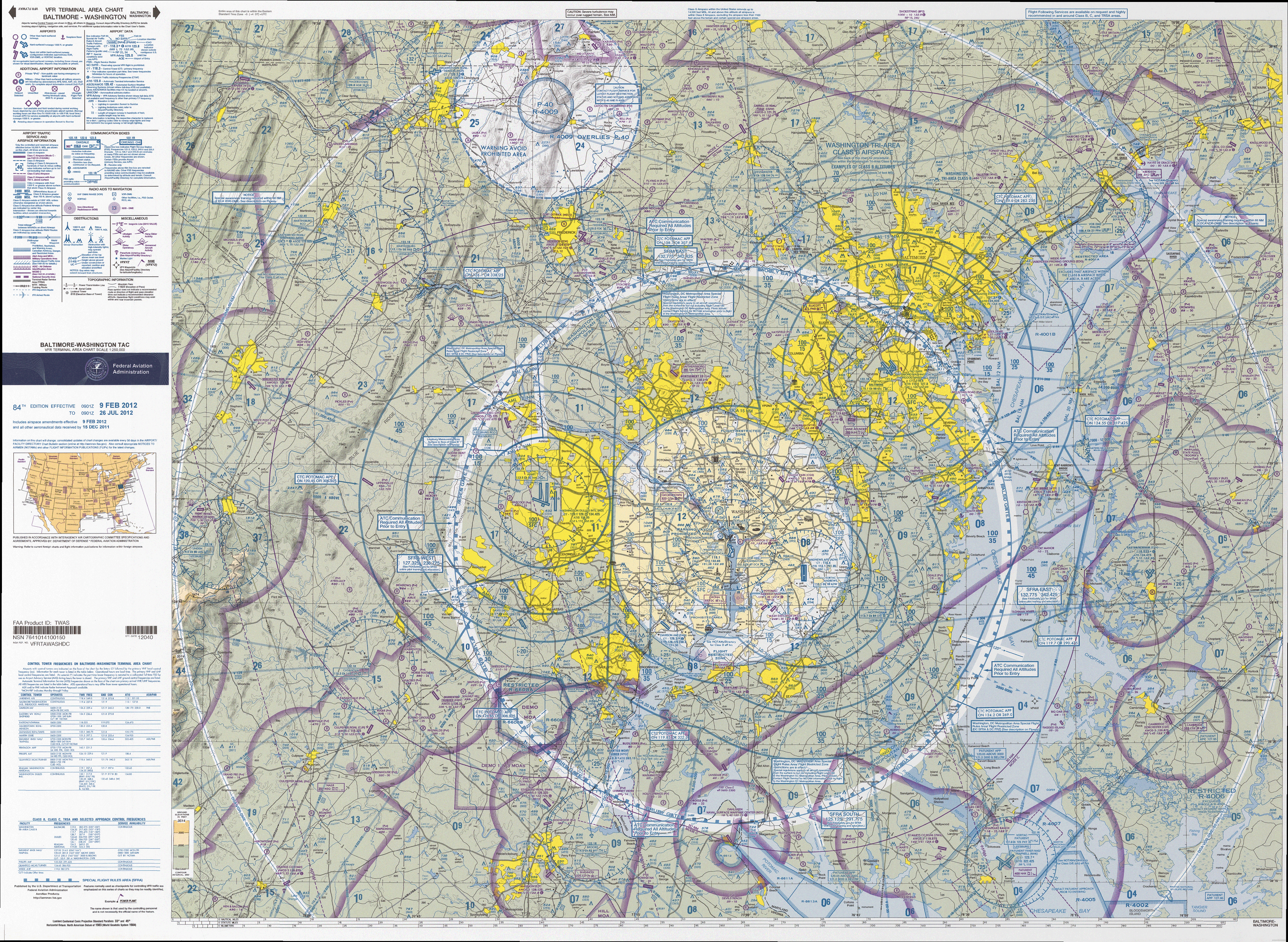
Aviation chart showing restricted airspace in the Washington DC area. Camp David is the light circle to the north.

On July 2, 2011, an F-15 intercepted a civilian aircraft approximately 6 miles (10 km) from Camp David, when President Obama was in the residence. The two-seater, which was out of radio communication, was escorted to nearby Hagerstown, Maryland, without incident.

On July 10, 2011, an F-15 intercepted another small plane near Camp David when Obama was again in the residence; a total of three planes were intercepted that weekend.

== See also ==
- List of residences of presidents of the United States
- Blair House, another official White House lodging for guests
- Camp Misty Mount Historic District and Camp Greentop Historic District, built at the same time in Catoctin Mountain Park as Camps 1 and 2
- Chequers, the country house of the prime minister of the United Kingdom
- Harrington Lake, the retreat of the prime minister of Canada
- Night of Camp David, a 1965 novel (political thriller)
- Official residence
- Orange One, a U.S. Navy-operated facility underneath Camp David
- Presidential Townhouse, the official guest house for former U.S. presidents
- Rapidan Camp, the predecessor of Camp David from 1929 to 1933
- Site R, bunker and communications center near Camp David
- Trowbridge House, adjacent to Blair House and the guest house for former presidents
- White House, official residence of the president of the United States since 1800
