= Catoctin Clarion =

Weekly newspaper published in Mechanicstown, Maryland, US

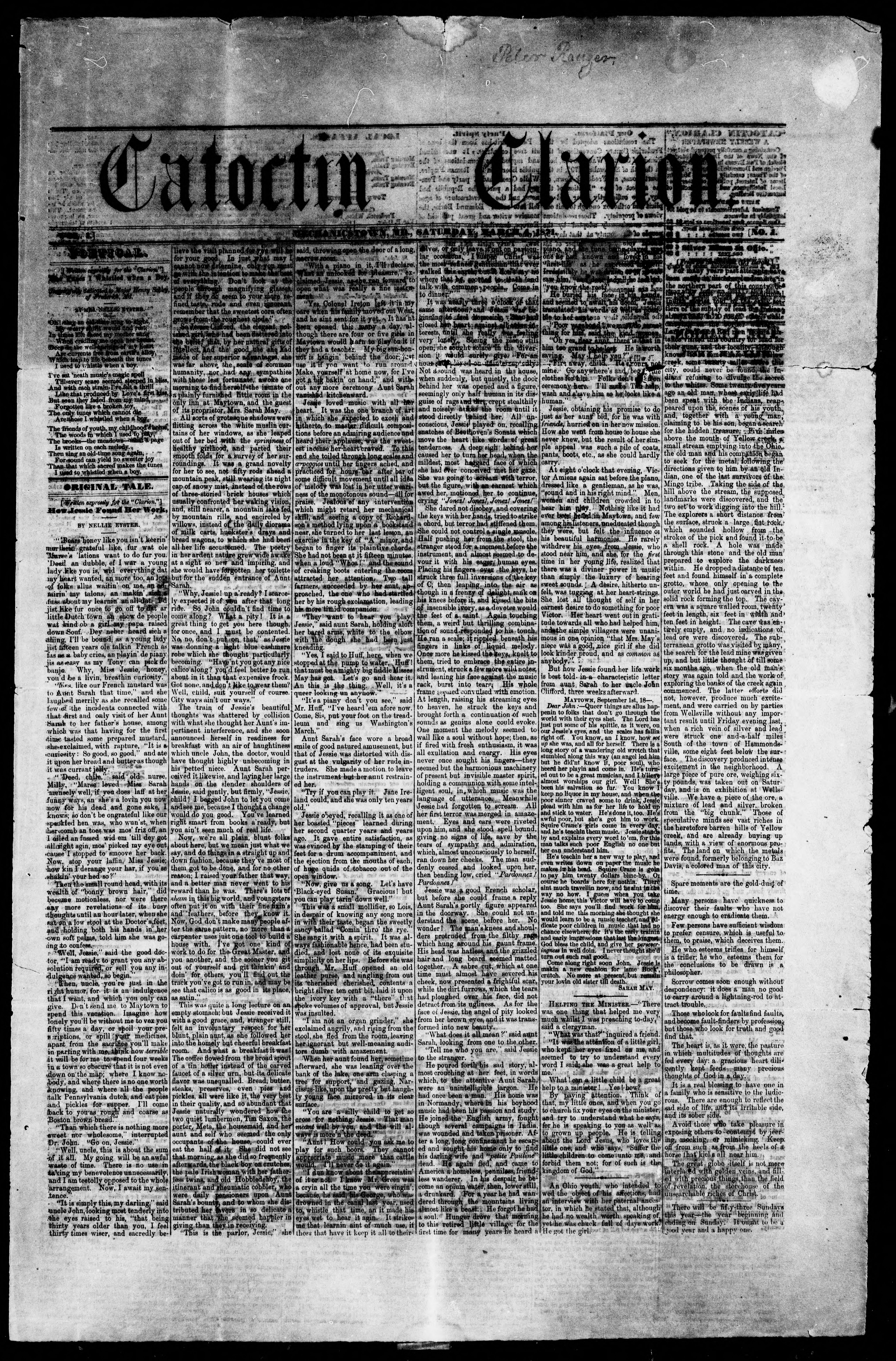
- The cover page of the March 4, 1871 issue of the Catoctin Clarion
- Type: Weekly newspaper
- Owner(s): William Need (1871–1875), Alex P. Beatty (1875–1879), Charles E. Cassell (1879–1905), Clarion Publishing Co. (1905–1921), J. Howard Cassell (1921–1942)
- Founder: William Need
- Publisher: William Need (1871–1875), Alex P. Beatty (1875–1879), Charles E. Cassell (1879–1905), Clarion Publishing Co. (1905–1921), J. Howard Cassell (1921–1942)
- Editor: William Need (1871–1875), Alex P. Beatty (1875–1879), Charles E. Cassell (1879–1905), C.C. Waters (1905–1921), Charles E. Cassell, Jr. (1921–1942)
- Founded: March 4, 1871
- Language: English
- OCLC number: 10617186

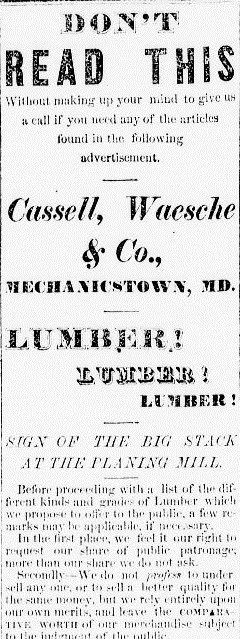
Advertisement appearing on p. 4 of the April 29, 1871, Catoctin Clarion. Via Chronicling America.

The Catoctin Clarion was a weekly newspaper published in Thurmont, Maryland (formerly Mechanicstown), United States, from March 4, 1871, to 1942. The paper was named for the nearby Catoctin Mountain located west of Mechanicstown. Contents included local, state, national and international news briefs; stories from Frederick County history; market news; poetry and literature in "a rare selection of instructive Reading"; letters to the editor, and advertisements, being called a "sprightly sheet of neat appearance... conducted with ability". The paper measured 18 by 24 inches and ran on Thursdays.

== History ==
The Clarion was founded by William Need and its inaugural issue was published on March 4, 1871. In this issue, Need stated his intent to establish a newspaper that would serve the best interests of citizens in Frederick County, writing the following notice:

"Custom requires and courtesy sanctions that we should state the grounds on which our paper will be conducted. It will, as stated in the prospectus, be 'independent, fearless and free' in the discussion of public matters--no great man's parasite, no party's tool. We intend to devote our energies to the development of the varied resources, and promote the interests of the citizens...We shall 'seek nothing that is to be won by kneeling,' but go on in the path of duty with a firm and vigorous hand, and leave to time to test the question whether we shall succeed or fail. We fear not the verdict of the people."

Though the paper had no official political affiliation, it endorsed Horace Greeley's 1872 presidential campaign. In 1875, Need fell into ill health and was forced to sell the Clarion to Alexander P. Beatty, a printer from Carlisle, Pennsylvania. Beatty echoed his predecessor's apolitical sentiments, writing in the July 23, 1875 issue of the Clarion, "Our paper will take no part in the bitter strife of party politics. [...] Our part, therefore, while we stand as a quiet looker-on at the movements of parties, will be rather to constantly urge upon each the selection of their best men--men of tried integrity and principle--for all stations of trust, from the highest to the lowest." By the end of 1878, Beatty had turned over the accounts to Van B. Osler, a local banker, as acknowledged beneath the masthead in the December 5, 1878 issue.

On August 1, 1879, Alexander Beatty sold the paper to Charles E. Cassell and Edgar L. Root, admitting in the October 30, 1879 issue that though "neither are practical printers," Cassell and Root were "well known both in social as well as in political circles" and would "leave nothing undone to make it one of the spiciest and best country papers in the State." Cassell and Root admit their inexperience again in their salutatory in the same issue, writing, "Although we are not tyros in the profession, yet...our determination to win, aided by an unsparing and intelligent criticism, may reasonably be expected to bear their fruit in due season." This promise ended up being fulfilled: as editor, Cassell became more active in local politics and continued to chronicle the economic growth of Mechanicstown. One of his most permanent legacies involved the change of the town's name from Mechanicstown to Thurmont in 1894.

Root left the Clarion in 1882, dramatically declaring that "the memory of our short connection with the Clarion will serve to strengthen and sustain our faith in the goodness of human nature and we shall go forward again to combat with the world stregthened [sic] with the knowledge that mankind, taken collectively, has more of good than of evil." Cassell ended up selling the paper to the Clarion Publishing Company and moving to Hanover, Pennsylvania in 1905, at which time Charles C. Waters took over editing. Waters was "one of the leading and most prominent members of the Frederick County Bar" and came from a family that could trace their history back to the first settlers of Frederick County. In their first issue, they assert, "The political policy of the paper is to be absolutely neutral and independent, allying itself with neither party." However, some notable topics were recorded during this period of ownership, including the impact of local women's suffrage movements and coverage of a major Spanish Flu outbreak.

The Catoctin Clarion was returned to the control of the Cassell family in 1921 when former owner Charles E. Cassell's sons J. Howard Cassell and Charles E. Cassell, Jr. acquired the paper. In their salutatory, published in the July 7, 1921 issue, the brothers detail the entire history of the paper's ownership, concluding with, "And again, after fourteen years, it is in new hands--yet would we say old hands, for, did we not serve our apprenticeship with the Clarion?" The brothers appear to have held ownership of the paper until it ceased publication. There is no specific record of when exactly the paper ceased publishing, but the Maryland State Archives retains microfilm versions of the paper up to February 6, 1942. Charles E. Cassell died a few years later in November 1945 at the age of 68.

After the Clarion ceased publishing, it was replaced by a new Thurmont newspaper called the Catoctin Enterprise. The Enterprise was published by George Carlton Rhoderick, Jr., a "good journalist" and a "self-made man" who had inherited ownership of the paper from his father after his death in 1906. In its first issue, Rhoderick wrote that the Enterprise "has come to Thurmont to stay--to be a part of the community life and to fill, if possible, what we believe has been a deeply noticeable void since Thurmont's former newspaper suspended publication."
