= Patapsco train collision =

1905 train wreck in Maryland, U.S.

Details
- Date: June 17, 1905 (121 years ago); 5:55 pm
- Location: Patapsco, Carroll County, Maryland
- Coordinates: 39°31′49″N 76°53′02″W
- Country: United States
- Line: Western Maryland Railroad
- Incident type: Head-on collision between moving trains
- Cause: Failure of freight train driver to wait for passenger train to pass

Statistics
- Trains: 2
- Deaths: 26
- Injured: 20

The Patapsco train collision (also known as the Ransom train wreck) occurred on June 17, 1905 near Patapsco station in Patapsco, Carroll County, Maryland. A Western Maryland Railroad passenger train collided head-on with a freight train, killing 26.

== Collision ==
On Saturday, June 17, 1905, the regularly scheduled Western Maryland Railroad passenger train No. 5 departed Hillen Station at 5 pm. The train consisted of an engine, tender, two baggage cars, and three day coaches. Its conductor, George T. Buckingham, was making his first run on the main line after being transferred from the Waynesboro branch.

Along the way, the train picked up 35 railroad workers who were repairing a damaged section of track near Mount Hope Station. As the passenger cars were full, most of the men found space in the baggage car. The remaining sat on one of the car's adjoining platforms.

At 5:55 pm, No. 5 collided head-on with special freight No. 43, consisting of two engines and 17 coal cars, about one and a half miles from Patapsco station in the village of Ransom. Both trains were traveling at a high rate of speed, with No. 5 traveling at 30 miles per hour and No. 43 likely going faster. No. 43 was supposed wait on a siding until three passenger trains had passed, but left after only the second train. A new schedule went into effect that day, which may have caused the crew of the No. 43 to think the they would pass the No 5. at a different time. The accident occurred on a curve where the railroad crosses the Patapsco River, so it was impossible for either train to see the other until it was too late to avoid a collision. The impact of the collision destroyed all three engines and drove No. 5's tender into the baggage car, demolishing it and the mail car. No 5's other cars derailed, but their passengers suffered only minor injuries.

Two physicians who were on the No. 5 directed the immediate care of the injured passengers. They were assisted by women from nearby farms who fashioned bandages from their clothing and household linen. A messenger was sent to the nearest telegraph station to summon help from nearby Westminster, Maryland. There, a number of physicians boarded a stopped mail train and proceeded to the wreck site. A relief train containing more physicians and medical supplies was sent from Baltimore. The seriously injured were transported to Union Station and brought by ambulance to Baltimore City Hospital. The bodies of the deceased were placed on the mail train and brought to the Westminster fire house for identification.

26 men, all employees of the Western Maryland Railroad, were killed in the wreck. Four of the deceased were crewmen on the No 5., four were crewmen on the No 43., and the other 18 had been part of the crew at Mount Hope Station. 16 of these men were from Thurmont, Maryland. The town closed all of its all businesses the Monday afternoon following the wreck, during which time most of the funerals were held.
