= Catoctin High School =

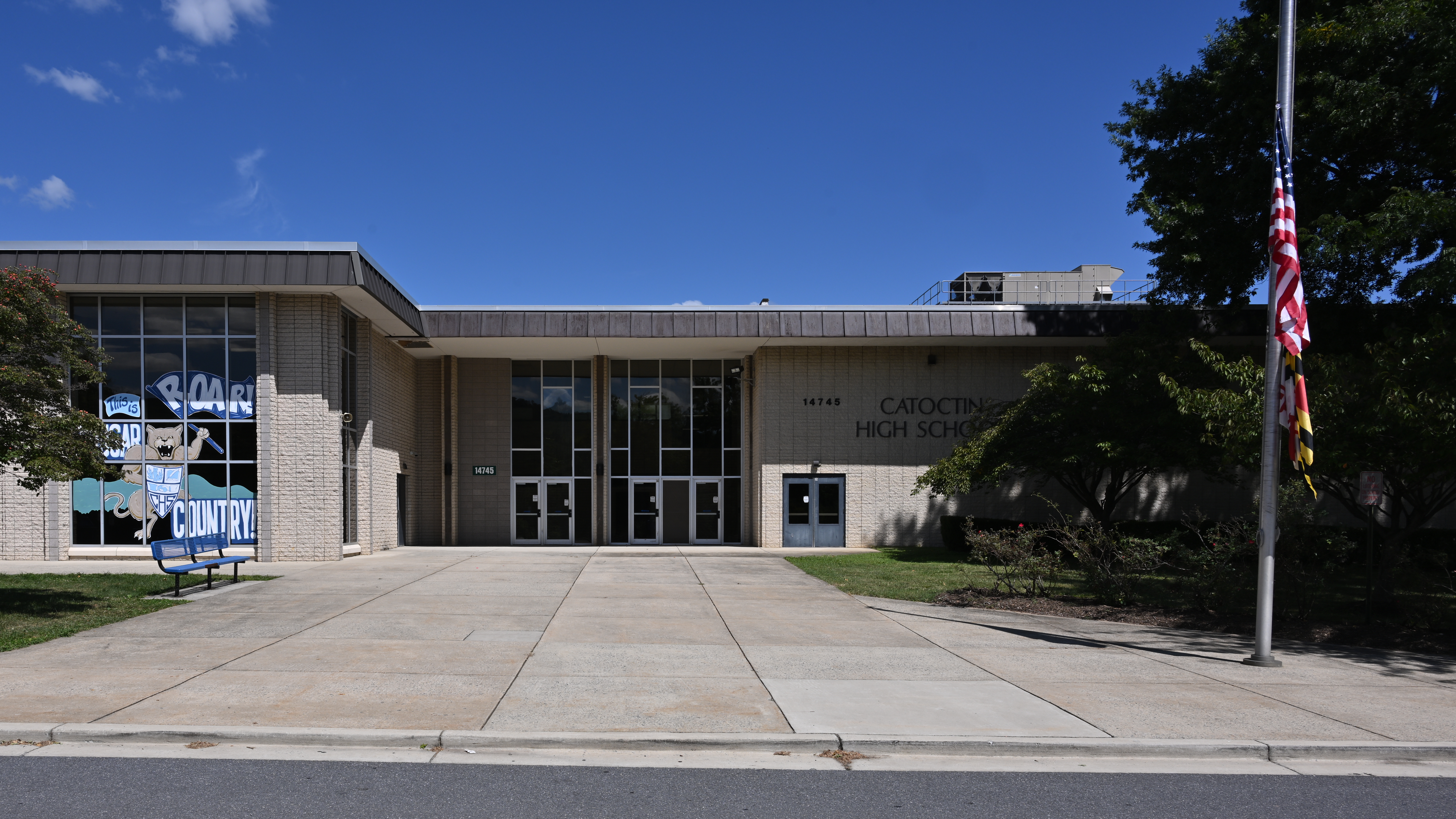

Location
- 14745 Sabillasville Road; Thurmont, Maryland 21788; United States; 39°38′19″N 77°24′33″W

Information
- School type: Public, High school
- Motto: Enabling All Students to Pursue Excellence
- Opened: 1969
- School district: Frederick County Public Schools
- Principal: Jennifer Clements
- Faculty: 41.00 (FTE)
- Grades: 9–12
- Gender: Coed
- Enrollment: 783 (2017–18)
- Student to teacher ratio: 19.10
- Campus: Rural
- Colors: Blue; White
- Team name: Cougars
- Website: School website

Catoctin High School (CHS) is a four-year public high school in Thurmont, Frederick County, Maryland, United States.

== Athletics ==
The following sports are offered at Catoctin:

- Cheerleading
- Cross country
- Field hockey
- Football
- Golf
- Soccer
- Volleyball
- Basketball
- Swimming & diving
- Indoor track
- Wrestling
- Baseball
- Lacrosse
- Softball
- Tennis
- Track
- Unified Bocce
- Unified Tennis
- Unified Track
- Women's Flag Football
