= Catoctin Mountain Park =

U.S. National Park system unit and historic district, in north-central Maryland

- Location within Maryland Location within the United States
- Location: Frederick County, Maryland, USA
- Nearest city: Thurmont, Maryland
- Coordinates: 39°38′04″N 77°27′00″W
- Area: 6,154 acres (24.90 km^{2})
- Established: July 12, 1954
- Visitors: 460,857 (in 2025)
- Governing body: National Park Service
- Website: Catoctin Mountain Park

Catoctin Mountain Park is a park located in part of the Monocacy Valley and Catoctin Mountain ridge−range that forms the northeastern rampart of the Blue Ridge Mountains, in the Appalachian Mountains System. The park is approximately 5120 acres or 8 square miles (21 km^{2}) in area.

Catoctin Mountain Park is managed by the National Park Service, and lies north of and directly adjacent to the similarly sized Cunningham Falls State Park.

== History ==
In the 1930s, after years of making charcoal to fuel nearby iron furnaces, mountain farming, and harvesting of trees for timber, land was purchased to be transformed into a productive recreation area, helping to put people back to work during the Great Depression. Beginning in 1935, the Catoctin Recreational Demonstration Area was under construction by both the Works Progress Administration and the Civilian Conservation Corps. The northern portion of the park was transferred to the National Park Service on November 14, 1936, and renamed and reorganized on July 12, 1954, with the southern 5,000 acres (20 km^{2}) transferred to Maryland as Cunningham Falls State Park.

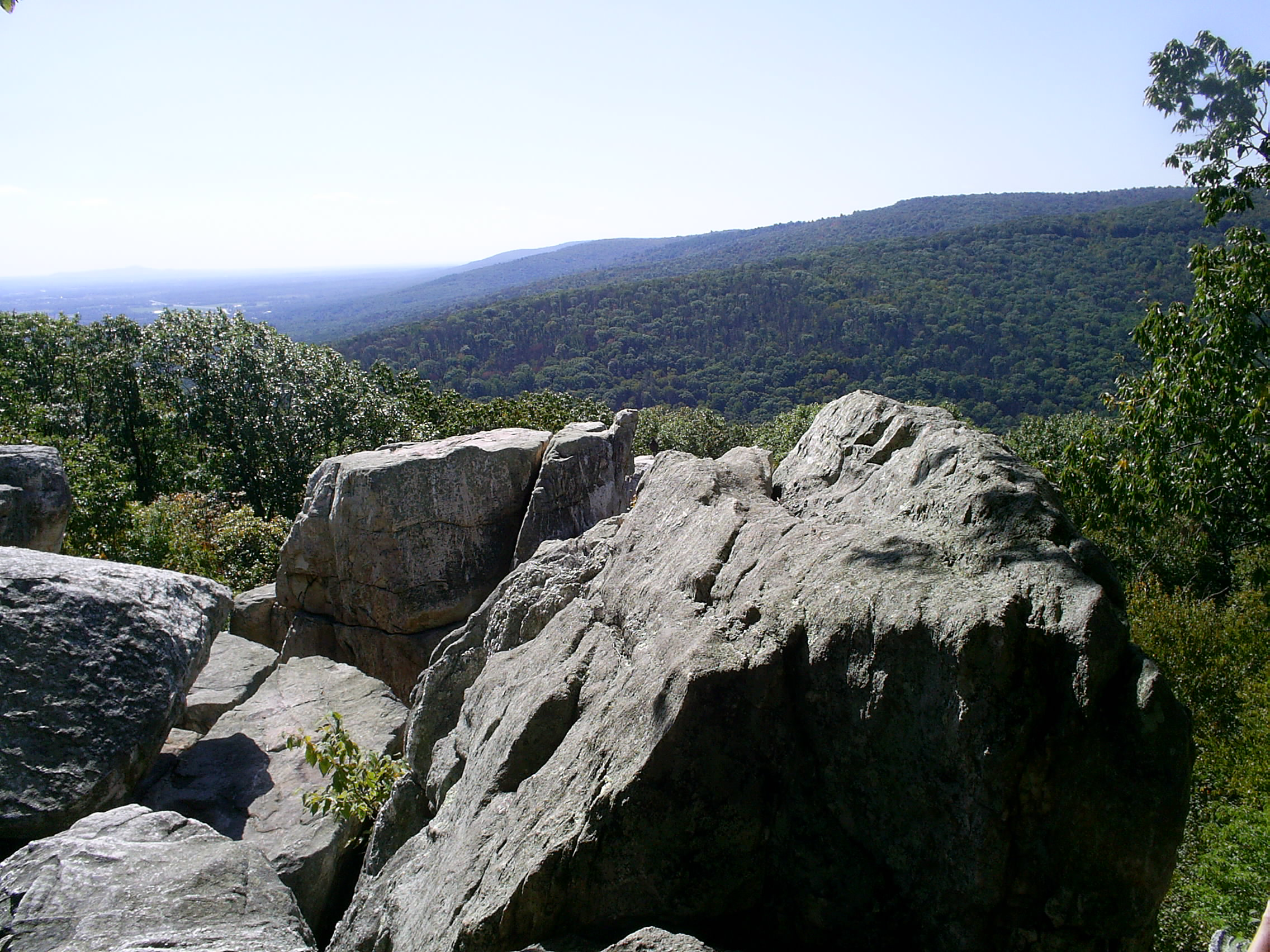
Catoctin Mountain vista

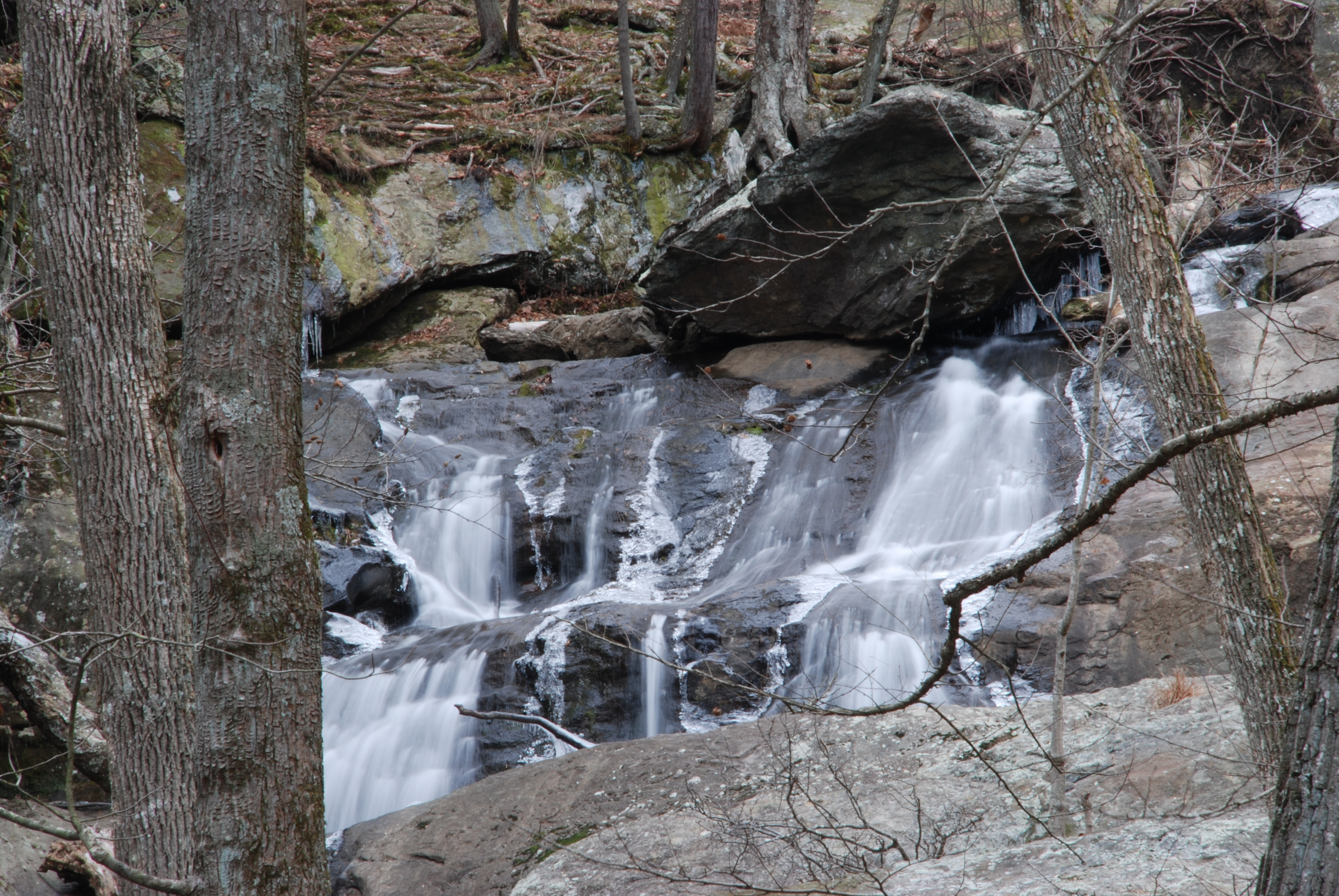
Cunningham Falls at Catoctin Mountain Park

Bills were introduced in the United States Senate in 2003 and 2005 to re-designate the park as Catoctin Mountain National Recreation Area. The bills passed the Senate, but were not taken up by the House, and therefore did not become law. The park was listed on the National Register of Historic Places in 2014.

Originally planned to provide recreational camps for federal employees, one of the camps eventually became the home of the Presidential retreat, Camp David. The Presidential retreat is not open or accessible to the public; however, the eastern hardwood forest of Catoctin Mountain Park does have many other attractions for visitors, some of which include camping, picnicking, fishing, 25 miles (40 km) of hiking trails, and scenic mountain vistas.

== See also ==
- Catoctin Mountain Park Run
- Catoctin Mountain
- Catoctin Trail
- Camp Misty Mount Historic District
- Camp Greentop Historic District
