= Thurmont, Maryland =

- Town
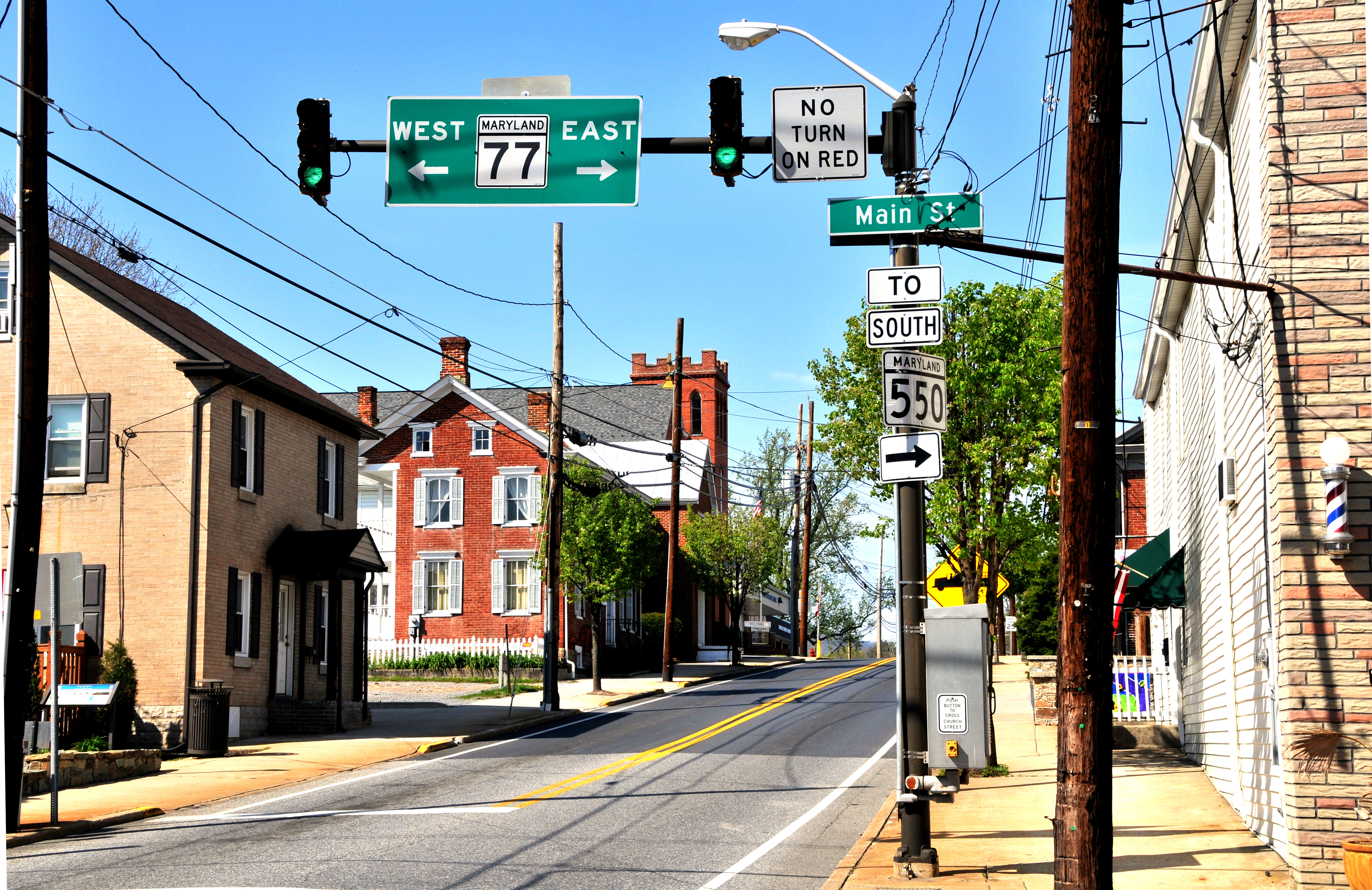
- Corner of Main and Water in downtown Thurmont

- Flag Seal
- Motto: "...Gateway to the Mountains"
- Location of Thurmont, Maryland
- Coordinates: 39°37′30″N 77°24′37″W
- Country: United States of America
- State: Maryland
- County: Frederick
- Founded: 1751
- Incorporated: 1831 (as Mechanicstown), 1894 (as Thurmont)

Area
  - Total: 3.12 sq mi (8.08 km^{2})
  - Land: 3.11 sq mi (8.05 km^{2})
  - Water: 0.012 sq mi (0.03 km^{2})
- Elevation: 482 ft (147 m)

Population (2020)
  - Total: 6,213
  - Density: 1,999.8/sq mi (772.12/km^{2})
- Time zone: UTC−5 (Eastern (EST))
  - Summer (DST): UTC−4 (EDT)
- ZIP Code: 21788
- Area codes: 301, 240
- FIPS code: 24-77825
- GNIS feature ID: 2391445
- Website: www.thurmont.com

Thurmont is a town in Frederick County, Maryland, United States. The population was 6,935 at the 2020 census. The town is located in the northern part of Frederick County (north of Frederick, the county seat), approximately ten miles from the Pennsylvania border, along U.S. Highway 15. It is very close to Cunningham Falls State Park and Catoctin Mountain Park, the latter of which contains the presidential retreat of Camp David. Thurmont is also home to Catoctin Colorfest, an arts and crafts festival that draws in about 125,000 people each autumn.

In 2005, Thurmont was designated as a Maryland Main Street Community, and in that year was designated a National Main Street under the National Trust for Historic Preservation.

== History ==
=== Name change ===
Originally incorporated as the Town of Mechanicstown in 1751, the name of the town was changed to Thurmont by an act of Maryland General Assembly on January 18, 1894. This name change was due to several other nearby towns having similar names, such as Mechanicsburg, Pennsylvania and Mechanicsville, Maryland. Charles E. Cassell, editor of the local newspaper Catoctin Clarion was the one to suggest the name Thurmont and promoted debate about the name change in the Clarion. Some of the names considered included Beaufort, Eastmont, Glenmont, Monduru, Fern Glen, and Blue Point. Eventually, the options were pared down to two main contenders: Cassell's suggestion of Thurmont, and local real estate broker Charles Shipley's suggestion of Blue Mountain City, which he argued was "appropriate" and "pretty" during an address at a town meeting in December 1893. In the December 14, 1893, issue, the Clarion printed the following:

The name is a misnomer: it is harshness long drawn out; it is an antique minus the lacquer; the sentimentalism that cries out against a change lacks its correlative, poetry, and smacks of the catacombs; its prestine [sic] glory is effaced by the ruthless circumstance of immigration to improve condition; an hundred, yea, hundreds of grandsons now recount to strangers in other States how their grand-fathers drove a thriving trade in factory, forge and mill in Mechanicstown and then confess--Ilium fuit; Delenda est Carthago! [Troy is no more; Carthage must be destroyed!]

By the end of December 1893, there had been several rounds of voting, and Thurmont had been officially chosen as the town's new name. The Clarion noted, however, that "the reception of a letter from the Postoffice Department saying that the name 'Blue Mountain City' would not be approved by the Department as there is an office called 'Blue Mountain' in the State, probably defeated the choice of that name."

The name Thurmont is derived from thur, the German word for gateway or entrance, and mons, the Latin word for mountain, roughly translating to "Gateway to the Mountains."

=== Railroads ===
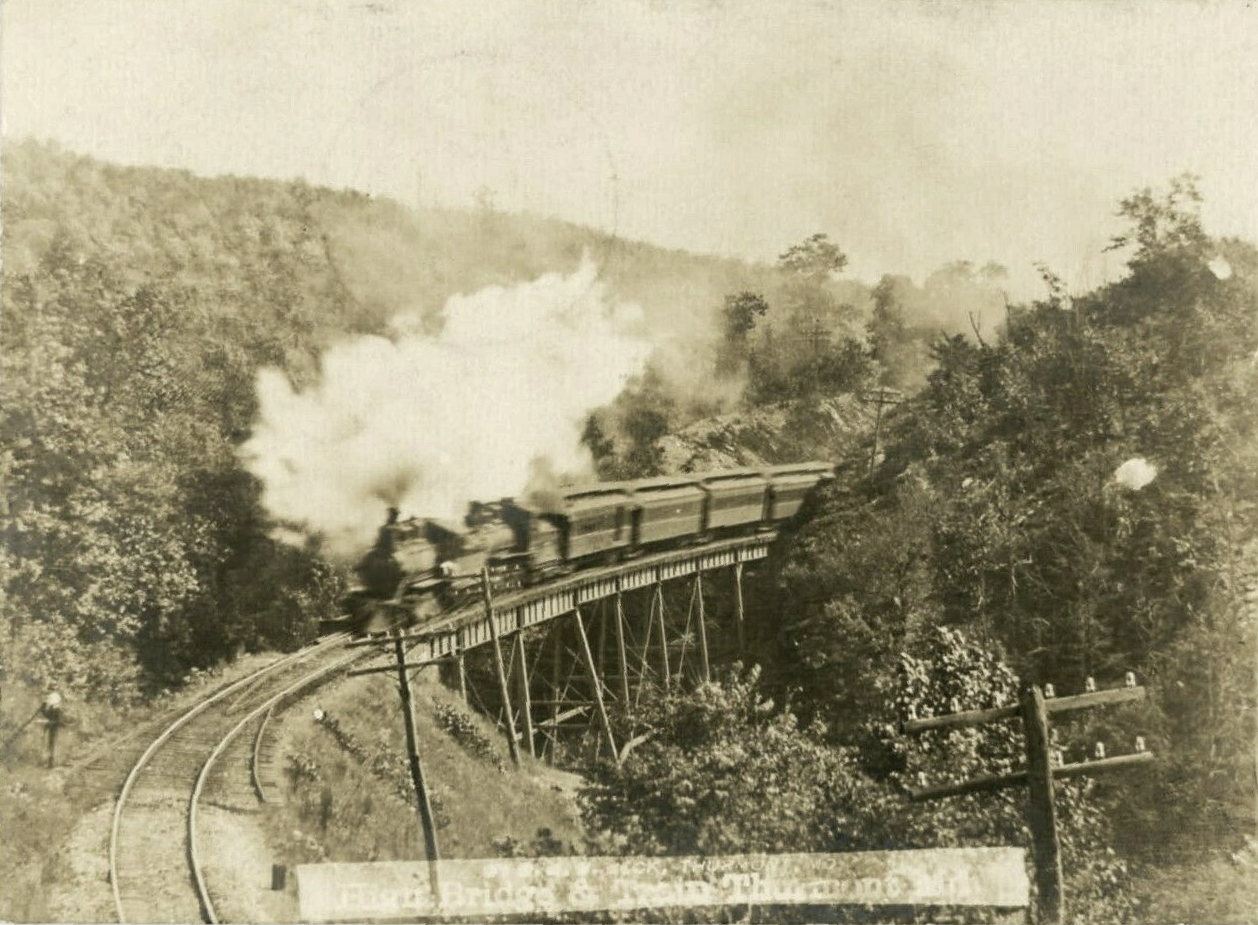
A steam train crossing a bridge in Thurmont

The Western Maryland Railway built its main railroad through Thurmont, connecting the town with Baltimore, and later with Hagerstown and Cumberland. On June 17, 1905, 16 men from Thurmont were killed in a railway wreck in Patapsco, Maryland when a westbound freight train collided head-on with another train. All Thurmont businesses were closed on the Monday following the accident, and it became an event that had a lasting effect on the entire community. Another large railway accident occurred on June 25, 1915, when the Blue Mountain Express train hit another train head-on just west of Thurmont, killing 6 people. Charles Frederick Eyler, who was 17 years old at the time of the crash, said the following: "People were still wondering the next day how the two engines had stayed on the rails. But it was easy to see how the wreck had occurred. The bridge is 'blind' from both directions."

The Washington, Frederick & Gettysburg Railroad operated between Thurmont and Frederick. In 1908, the railway was bought out by the Hagerstown and Frederick Railway, which serviced the line until 1958.

== Geography ==
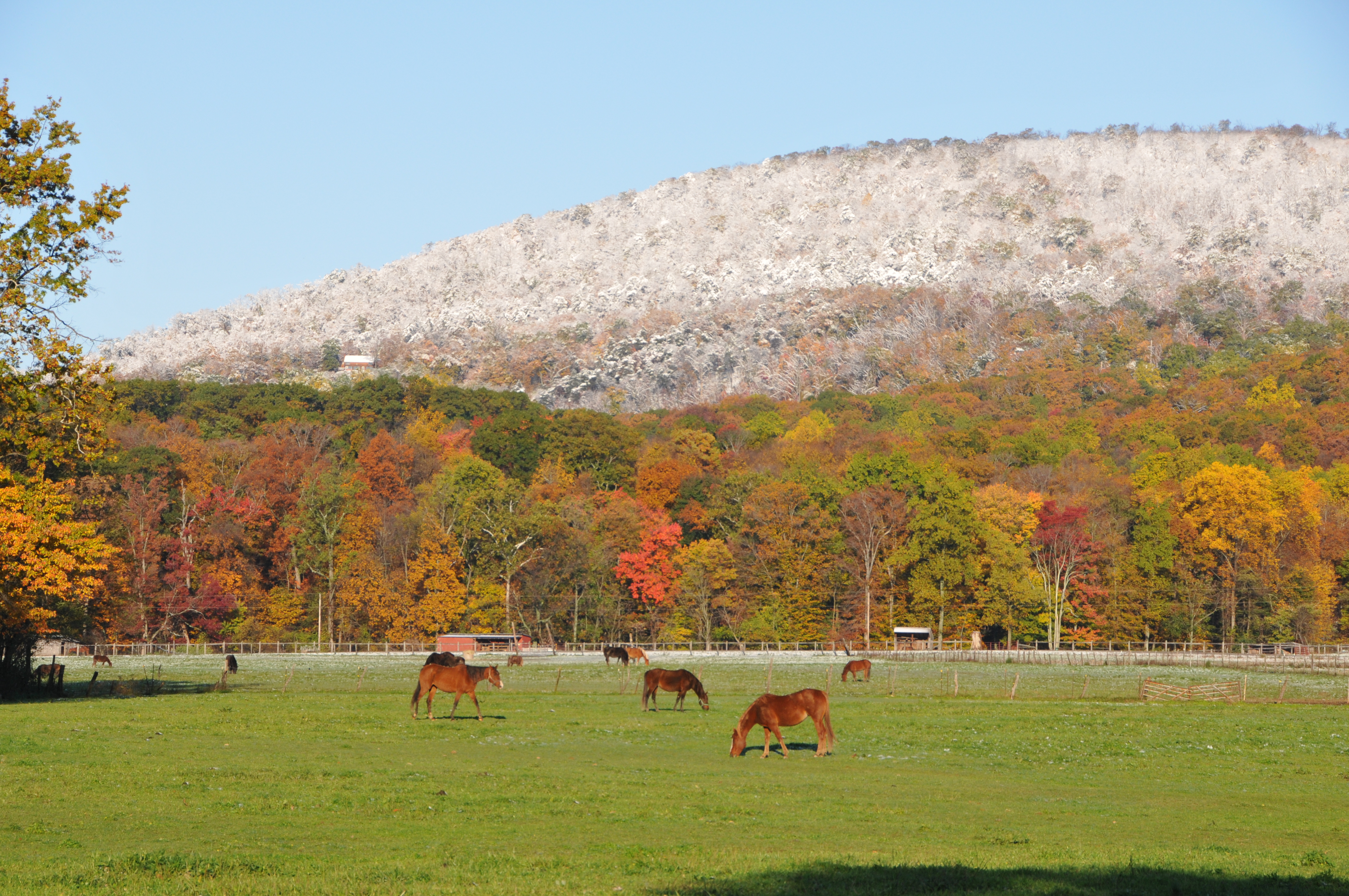
The Catoctin Mountains near Thurmont

Thurmont is located at the eastern foothill of the Catoctin spur of the Blue Ridge Mountains.

According to the United States Census Bureau, the town has a total area of 3.13 square miles (8.11 km^{2}), of which 3.12 square miles (8.08 km^{2}) is land and 0.01 square miles (0.03 km^{2}) is water.

=== Climate ===
The climate in this area is characterized by hot, humid summers and generally mild to cool winters. According to the Köppen Climate Classification system, Thurmont has a humid subtropical climate, abbreviated "Cfa" on climate maps.

== Demographics ==
Historical population
| Census | Pop. | Note | %± |
|---|---|---|---|
| 1870 | 583 | | — |
| 1880 | 730 | | 25.2% |
| 1890 | 930 | | 27.4% |
| 1900 | 868 | | −6.7% |
| 1910 | 903 | | 4.0% |
| 1920 | 1,074 | | 18.9% |
| 1930 | 1,185 | | 10.3% |
| 1940 | 1,307 | | 10.3% |
| 1950 | 1,676 | | 28.2% |
| 1960 | 1,998 | | 19.2% |
| 1970 | 2,359 | | 18.1% |
| 1980 | 2,934 | | 24.4% |
| 1990 | 3,398 | | 15.8% |
| 2000 | 5,588 | | 64.4% |
| 2010 | 6,170 | | 10.4% |
| 2020 | 6,213 | | 0.7% |
U.S. Decennial Census

=== 2020 census ===
As of the 2020 census, Thurmont had a population of 6,213. The median age was 42.1 years. 20.0% of residents were under the age of 18 and 17.5% of residents were 65 years of age or older. For every 100 females there were 98.2 males, and for every 100 females age 18 and over there were 90.9 males age 18 and over.

98.5% of residents lived in urban areas, while 1.5% lived in rural areas.

There were 2,520 households in Thurmont, of which 30.1% had children under the age of 18 living in them. Of all households, 50.0% were married-couple households, 15.4% were households with a male householder and no spouse or partner present, and 26.5% were households with a female householder and no spouse or partner present. About 24.6% of all households were made up of individuals and 12.3% had someone living alone who was 65 years of age or older.

There were 2,632 housing units, of which 4.3% were vacant. The homeowner vacancy rate was 1.4% and the rental vacancy rate was 4.6%.

Racial composition as of the 2020 census
| Race | Number | Percent |
|---|---|---|
| White | 5,666 | 91.2% |
| Black or African American | 65 | 1.0% |
| American Indian and Alaska Native | 15 | 0.2% |
| Asian | 61 | 1.0% |
| Native Hawaiian and Other Pacific Islander | 0 | 0.0% |
| Some other race | 102 | 1.6% |
| Two or more races | 304 | 4.9% |
| Hispanic or Latino (of any race) | 256 | 4.1% |

=== Income and poverty ===
The median income for a household in the town was $49,530, and the median income for a family was $56,138. Males had a median income of $37,804 versus $27,266 for females. The per capita income for the town was $20,474. About 4.0% of families and 6.1% of the population were below the poverty line, including 8.3% of those under age 18 and 5.8% of those age 65 or over.

=== 2010 census ===
As of the census of 2010, there were 6,170 people, 2,354 households, and 1,701 families residing in the town. The population density was 1,977.6 inhabitants per square mile (763.6/km^{2}). There were 2,498 housing units at an average density of 800.6 per square mile (309.1/km^{2}). The racial makeup of the town was 95.8% White, 1.0% Black, 0.4% Native American, 0.6% Asian, 0.7% from other races, and 1.5% from two or more races. Hispanic or Latino of any race were 2.4% of the population.

There were 2,354 households, of which 36.7% had children under the age of 18 living with them, 56.9% were married couples living together, 11.3% had a female householder with no husband present, 4.1% had a male householder with no wife present, and 27.7% were non-families. 22.3% of all households were made up of individuals, and 9.3% had someone living alone who was 65 years of age or older. The average household size was 2.62 and the average family size was 3.08.

The median age in the town was 39.5 years. 25.8% of residents were under the age of 18; 7.2% were between the ages of 18 and 24; 26.3% were from 25 to 44; 27.7% were from 45 to 64; and 13.1% were 65 years of age or older. The gender makeup of the town was 48.4% male and 51.6% female.

== Infrastructure ==
=== Transportation ===
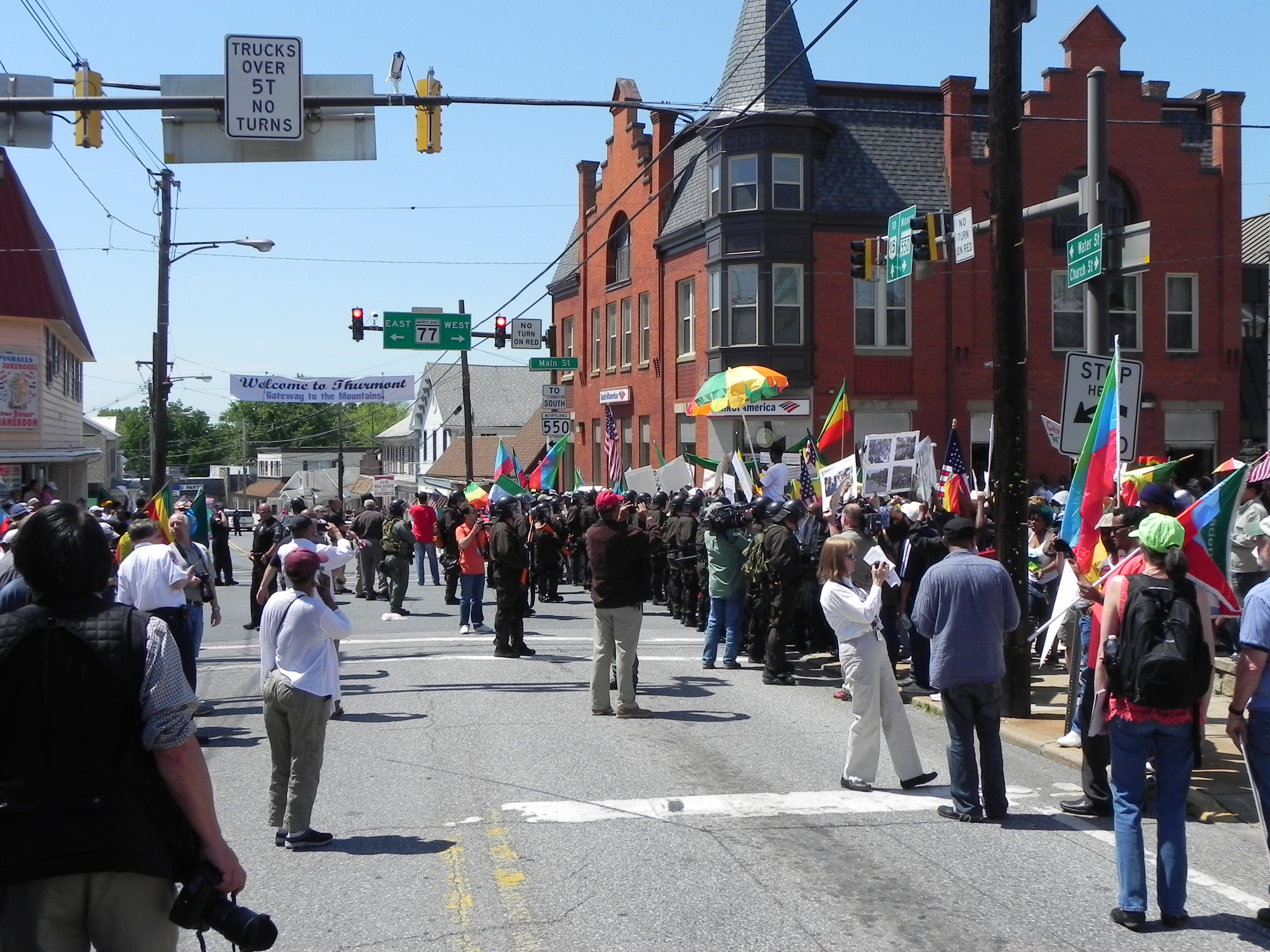
Protesters in Thurmont during the 2012 G8 Summit, hosted at nearby Camp David.

The primary method of travel to and from Thurmont is by road. U.S. Route 15 is the main highway serving Thurmont, providing connections northward to Gettysburg, Pennsylvania and southward to Frederick. Maryland Route 806 follows portions of the old alignment of US 15 through the center of Thurmont, with the main highway now following a bypass on the west side of town. Maryland Route 77 is the main east-west highway traversing the town, which provides connections eastward towards Keymar and westward towards Smithsburg. MD 77 also provides access to Catoctin Mountain Park. One other highway, Maryland Route 550, provides access northwestward towards Fort Ritchie and southeastward to Woodsboro.

TransIT provides service to the town via the Emmitsburg / Thurmont Shuttle.

== Education ==
It is in Frederick County Public Schools.

School zoning is as follows: It is zoned to Thurmont Primary School, Thurmont Elementary School, Thurmont Middle School, and Catoctin High School.

== Notable people ==
- Neal Coty, country music singer
- John P. T. Mathias (1848–1927), member of the Maryland House of Delegates and Maryland Senate
- Richard Troxell, opera singer
