= Cullen House (disambiguation) =

Cullen House is a grand estate house in the coastal town of Cullen in Moray, Scotland.

Cullen House may also refer to:

== Places ==
- Cullen Homestead Historic District, Crisfield, Maryland, listed on the U.S. National Register of Historic Places (NRHP)
- William Cullen Bryant Homestead, Cummington, Massachusetts, NRHP-listed
- Whipple-Cullen House and Barn, n Lincoln, Rhode Island, NRHP-listed
- Ezekiel Cullen House, San Augustine, Texas, NRHP-listed in San Augustine County
- Keyser-Cullen House, Salt Lake City, Utah, NRHP-listed

== Fictional places ==
- Cullen House (Twilight), a setting which was home of vampire Edward Cullen and family in Twilight (2008 film)

== See also ==
- Victor Cullen Center, Old Administration Building, Sabillasville, Maryland
- Victor Cullen School Power House, Sabillasville, Maryland
