= John W. Garrett =

American banker & railroad executive

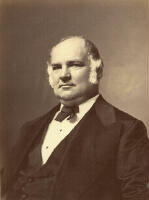
- Born: July 31, 1820; Baltimore, Maryland, U.S.
- Died: September 26, 1884 (aged 64); Deer Park, Maryland, U.S.
- Resting place: Green Mount Cemetery
- Occupations: Banker; railroad executive
- Years active: 1850s–1880s
- Known for: President, Baltimore and Ohio Railroad
- Predecessor: Chauncy Brooks
- Successor: Robert Garrett, II
- Spouse: Rachel Ann Harrisson (died 1883)
- Children: 4, including Mary Elizabeth

John Work Garrett (July 31, 1820 – September 26, 1884) was an American merchant turned banker who became president of the Baltimore and Ohio Railroad (B&O) in 1858 and led the railroad for nearly three decades. The B&O became one of the most important American railroads by the time Garrett died. The rail magnate would also become a noted philanthropist, providing Johns Hopkins University with B&O stock worth more than 1 billion inflation-adjusted dollars. He provided crucial support for the Union cause during the Civil War, expanded the railroad to reach Chicago, Illinois, and competed with the Pennsylvania Railroad for access to New York City.

== Early life ==
Born in Baltimore, on July 31, 1820, to merchant Robert Garrett (1783–1857) and his wife Elizabeth Stouffer Garrett (1791–1877). Like his elder brother Henry Garrett (1818-1867), John W. Garrett attended Boisseau Academy in Baltimore, essentially a prep school for Lafayette College. He attended the college in Easton, Pennsylvania, but never graduated. His father Robert [Sr.], had come from Ireland as a young boy in 1801 with his parents and family, including his father who died at sea during the transit. The Garrett family also included a daughter, Elizabeth Garrett White (1827–1917).

John Work Garrett married Rachel Ann Harrisson (1823–1883), and the couple had four children, three of whom survived their parents: Robert Garrett (1847–1896), Thomas Harrison Garrett (1849–1888) and Mary Elizabeth Garrett (1854–1915). Their initial residence was on Fayette Street, in the heart of Baltimore's present business district.

== Early commercial career ==
At age 19 (in 1839) Garrett began working as a clerk and apprentice in his father's mercantile, banking and financial services firm, founded 1819, Robert Garrett and Company (later Robert Garrett and Sons). He and his brother Henry learned the business from the ground up, as had their father, including how to tan leather from the teamster Alexander Sharp, how to salt pork and how to pack madder and Spanish whiting in barrels. While Henry remained in Baltimore, John Garrett headed west, seeking to expand trade over the mountains. His travels through Virginia into Ohio, Kentucky, Indiana, and beyond taught him that the key to Baltimore's commerce lay in the western states, whose trade came to eastern ports including Baltimore.

The Garrett company's initial fleet of Conestoga wagons carried food and supplies west over the old National Road, from Baltimore to Cumberland, Maryland and further to Ohio and the territorial capital at Vandalia, Illinois, or via the Ohio River toward the Mississippi River, or over the Cumberland Trail towards Kentucky and Tennessee. From their store then located on Howard Street, Robert Garrett and Company supplied western general stores with various goods, including flints, chocolate and chalk, and in turn received ginseng, snakeroot and whiskey.

As the brothers took over the business from their father, they sponsored new projects, building warehouses and hotels such as the Howard House and the Eutaw House on Baltimore's west side. With the end of the Mexican–American War of 1846–1848, they expanded toward the new American Southwest and California, causing the largest steamship then ever built in Baltimore, "The Monumental City", which soon made regular runs down the Chesapeake Bay to New Orleans, and San Francisco. The company added to its fleet and expanded its mercantile and financial business to South America and Europe.

== Interest in B&O Railroad ==
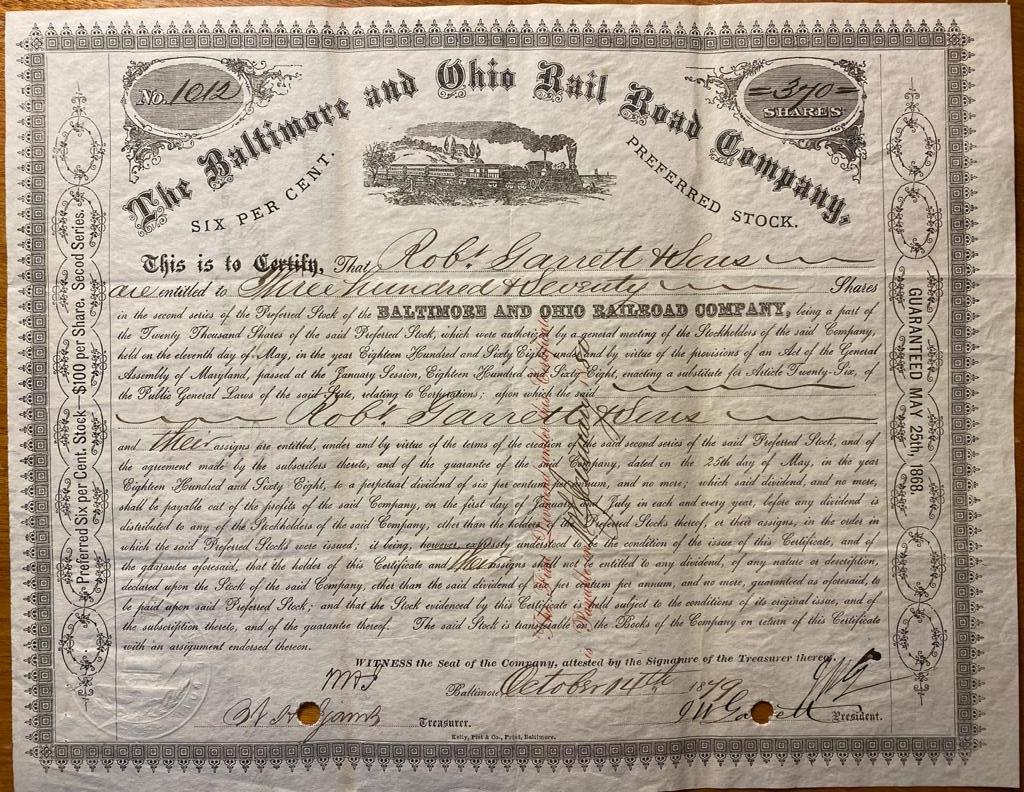
Share of the Baltimore and Ohio Rail-Road Company, issued October 14, 1879

Garrett began purchasing B&O Railroad stock early, when the railroad was competing with the newly completed Chesapeake and Ohio Canal, which paralleled the Potomac River from Georgetown near Washington, D.C., to Cumberland and the National Road. Virginia also subsidized canals and railroads which would connect with the National Road further along, in Wheeling. In its early years the B&O had a combination of private and public ownership, because it needed public grants and loans to both acquire right-of-way and build the railroad, but this also led to conflicts within the board. Of the 30 members of the B&O's board of directors, 18 were selected by the State of Maryland and the City of Baltimore, who helped fund the construction. In 1854, the Baltimore City Council extended a five million dollars emergency loan to the struggling railroad's growing construction debt as the line pushed westward over the Appalachian Mountains. During the Panic of 1857, money became extremely tight.

Brother Henry Garrett had been serving as a B&O director for some time and in 1847, John Work Garrett joined him. The local newspaper The Sun on November 17, 1858, reported on the extensive debate and controversy between those directors wishing to keep the line in private hands, and those representing the interests of the state and city governments. The meeting included an election, and by a vote of 16 to 14, Garrett was elected over incumbent executive Chauncy Brooks (1794-1880) of "Cloverdale", who represented the state interests. Following a motion by board member Johns Hopkins (1795-1873), the largest stockholder since 1847 as well as chairman of the financial committee, Garrett became the B&O's new president. Hopkins, a Maryland native, had become a hardware wholesale merchant on South Charles Street and made his substantial fortune in Baltimore. The Garrett Company as well as the B&O also had strong ties to the London-based George Peabody & Company, and through their business interests, financier George Peabody (1795–1869).

== The Civil War ==
The B&O got an early taste of the Civil War during abolitionist John Brown's raid on the Federal armory in Harper's Ferry, West Virginia (in those days still part of Virginia). Garrett learned that raiders had stopped a train at Harper's Ferry, and sent a telegram to the U.S. Secretary of War. Federal troops with U.S. Marines led by Colonel Robert E. Lee (U.S. Army), from Arlington House, Virginia across the river from the Capital, were sent to put down the rebellion on a special B&O train.

Garrett had previously always considered the B&O to be a "Southern railroad", and had originally pro-South sympathies. However, his business sense, with possibly political and economic acumen (and his anger at seeing Confederates tearing up his railroad) made him side with the Union and the policies of President Abraham Lincoln. Under his direction, the B&O was instrumental in supporting the Federal government, as it was the main rail connection between Washington, D.C., and the northern and western states. Garrett became a confidante of President Lincoln, and often accompanied him on his visits to battlefields in Maryland. During the third Confederate invasion of the North in July 1864, B&O agents began reporting Confederate troop movements in western Virginia, the Shenandoah Valley and through Frederick, Maryland under General Jubal Early eleven days prior to what became the critical Battle of the Monocacy. Garrett had their intelligence passed to the U.S. War Department, particularly to Major General Lew Wallace (later noted author of the historical novel Ben Hur), who commanded the department responsible for defense of the area surrounding the national capitol. As battle preparations progressed, Garrett provided transport for Federal troops and munitions, and on two occasions President Lincoln contacted him directly for further information. Though Union forces lost this battle, the two-day delay allowed General Ulysses S. Grant, then campaigning further south and threatening the Confederate capital, Richmond and nearby Petersburg to detach several Federal regiments from his substantial forces and send them up north on the Chesapeake Bay and Potomac River. They two days later thus repelled the Gen. Early's attack on Washington at the Battle of Fort Stevens on the capital's northwestern outskirts of the capital. After the battle, President Lincoln commended Garrett as "The right arm of the Federal Government in the aid he rendered the authorities in preventing the Confederates from seizing Washington and securing its retention as the Capital of the Loyal States."

In 1865, Garrett organized the funeral train that took the assassinated president's corpse from Washington to Springfield, Illinois. The several-week procession included stops and ceremonies in Baltimore; Harrisburg, Pennsylvania; Philadelphia; New York City; Albany, New York; Buffalo, New York; Cleveland; Columbus; Indianapolis; and Chicago.

== Postbellum activities ==
After the war, Garrett acquired three gunboats that had been used in the blockade service and refitted them into packet boats, establishing the first regular line service from Baltimore to Liverpool, Pennsylvania. He was also associated with several telegraph companies. Garrett also expanded the B&O by purchasing competing railroads in Ohio and Virginia. The B&O had reached Pittsburgh, Pennsylvania before the war, where it competed with the Pennsylvania Railroad for western traffic. However, the route west from Pittsburgh continued through the Appalachian Mountains, which raised costs as well as engineering headaches. The easier route west, along either bank of the Ohio River, was initially owned by competing railroads. Garrett bought the Central Ohio Railroad, which reached Sandusky, Ohio, from which a relatively level expanse continued through Ohio into Indiana and Illinois. In the early 1870s, Garrett expanded the B&O westward from Chicago Junction (later Willard, Ohio) through Nappanee, Indiana, reaching "Baltimore Junction" at the edge of Chicago on November 15, 1874.

=== Railroad strikes of 1877 ===
Garrett was president of the B&O during the Great Railroad Strike of 1877, which was a result of his wage-cutting response to the widespread depression caused by the Panic of 1873, as well as his need for capital to expand the railroad.

On July 20, 1877, he asked Maryland Governor John Lee Carroll to move troops from Baltimore, Maryland to Cumberland, Maryland, where large crowds had gathered at a B&O facility and the situation deteriorated. This troop movement erupted into riots in Baltimore, which continued to spread throughout much of the country. President Rutherford B. Hayes ultimately used federal troops to end the strike (which had spread to other railroads) by force.

Following the strife, in 1880, Garrett helped organize the B&O Employees' Relief Association. The B&O provided its initial endowment and assumed all administrative costs. Worker coverage included sickness, indefinite time for recovery from accidents, and a death benefit. In 1884, Garrett was instrumental in negotiating the loans which allowed the B&O to extend its main line northeast to Philadelphia and through connections with the Philadelphia and Reading Railroad to reach New York City, to compete further with the dominant northeastern lines, the Pennsylvania Railroad and the New York Central.

Meanwhile, Garrett became deeply involved with the Peabody Institute, which George Peabody had created and endowed in 1857, along with several programs and facilities which opened following the Civil War in 1866. As one of the institute's trustees, Garrett asked Peabody to persuade Johns Hopkins (1795–1873) to make the bequest that eventually led to creation of the Johns Hopkins University in 1876.

=== Johns Hopkins University ===
According to Peabody's biographer Franklin Parker, at Johns Hopkins' request, Garrett arranged a dinner meeting with Peabody and Hopkins, and the very next day Hopkins announced his intention to found a hospital and a university. While this story is uncorroborated, Peabody likely did influence Hopkins in deciding what to do with his wealth. Parker also refers to Hopkins as "married but childless," but Hopkins never married. As a friend and business associate, it was logical that Garrett would be asked to serve as a trustee, and he became one of the twelve founding trustees of The Johns Hopkins University.

As the University grew, Garrett found himself at odds with his fellow trustees on two major issues. The original $3.5 million University endowment had been given by Hopkins in the form of B&O Railroad stock, and Hopkins recommended that the stock be held, not sold. In the 1880s, the railroad stopped paying dividends on its stock, and the trustees felt they had no choice but to sell the stock. Garrett objected to this as a violation of the founder's wishes, arguing that the railroad remained financially sound. The other eleven trustees, fearing that the new University might collapse in bankruptcy, prevailed and the stock was sold.

Along with the B&O stock endowment, Hopkins had given his summer estate, Clifton, with the understanding that it would eventually become a permanent campus, once capital had been accumulated to commence a building program. However, along with selling the B&O stock, the trustees felt they had no choice but to sell Clifton, over Garrett's strenuous objections. He felt it was another betrayal of the founder's wishes, even though Hopkins left no written instructions stating that Clifton had to be retained or become the Hopkins campus. Garrett felt so strongly about these two issues that he felt he had to "denounce the board publicly and withdraw from its counsels." Ultimately, Clifton was sold to the City of Baltimore after Garrett's death.

Following the founding of the Johns Hopkins University in 1876, the Johns Hopkins Hospital opened in 1889, and the Johns Hopkins School of Medicine in 1893.

=== Residences and personal matters ===
In 1870 Garrett purchased 1,400 acres in northeast Baltimore and built a summer home that he named "Montebello." The Victorian-style wood-frame turreted mansion in what is now the Coldstream-Homestead-Montebello neighborhood was demolished in the early 1900s.

As many well-to-do families moved to more spacious and luxurious residences, they acquired a semi-detached mansion in a neighborhood then known as "Garrett Park" near Franklin Square on the west side. A later house fire resulted in the dramatic rescue of the two Garrett boys who were taken to the imposing nearby residence of Gen. George H. Steuart (militia general). Garrett purchased and gave to his son Robert II (1847–1887) a substantial townhouse on West Mount Vernon Place, later known as the Garrett Jacobs Mansion.

In 1878 Garrett purchased and gave to his son, T. Harrison, "Evergreen" mansion off North Charles Street above Cold Spring Lane. The mansion was donated by a Garrett family descendant to The Johns Hopkins University in 1942. Evergreen is now the home of the rare book collection of The Johns Hopkins University.

Garrett's daughter, Mary Elizabeth Garrett (1854–1915), a civic activist, philanthropist in her own right and suffragist, helped found the Bryn Mawr School, the Baltimore Museum of Art (1914), and secured the admission of women to the Johns Hopkins School of Medicine as a condition of her bequest to supplement the endowment of Hopkins' from twenty years before. Thus, the new Hopkins medical college became one of the nation's first co-educational schools in 1893.

== Death and legacy ==
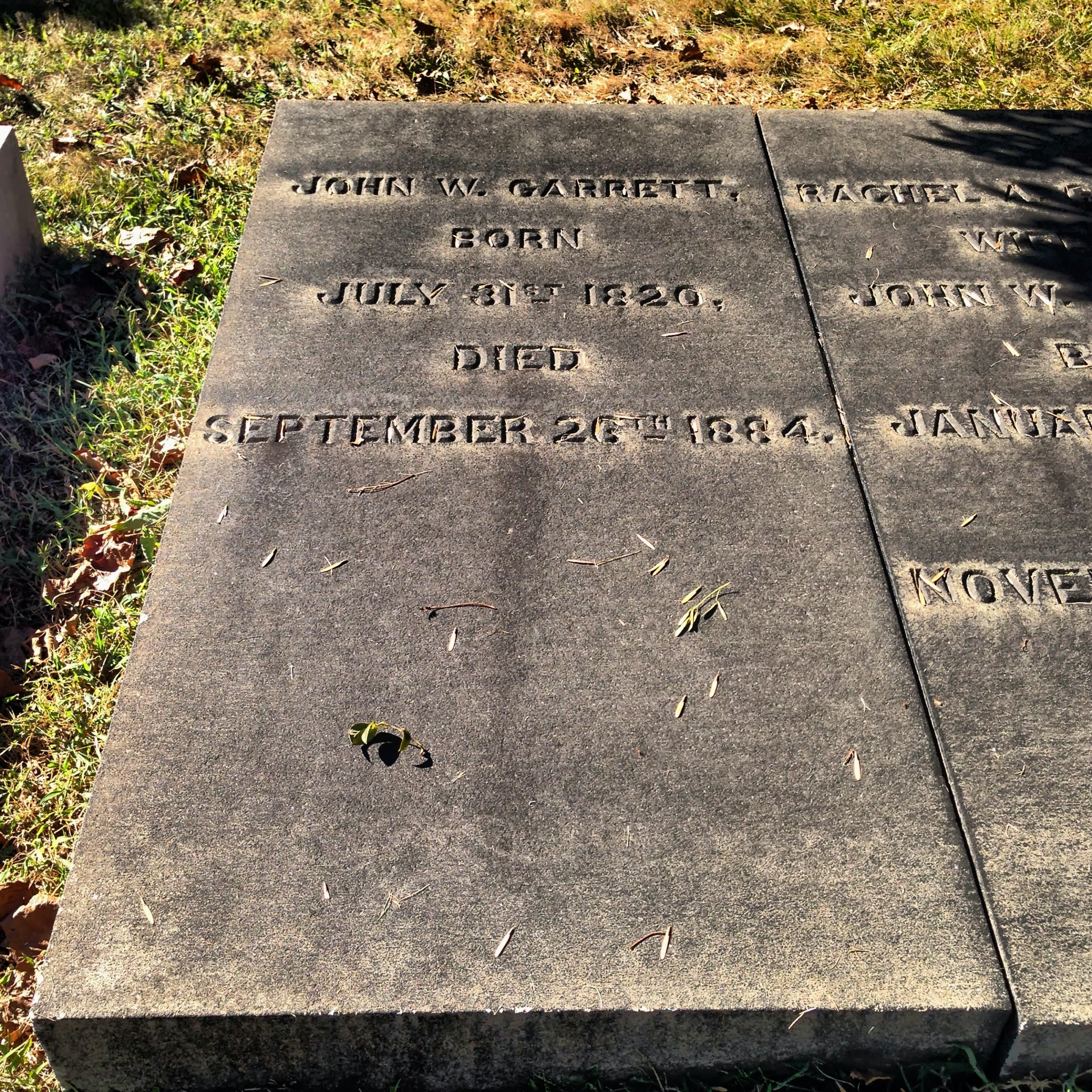
Grave of Garrett in Green Mount Cemetery

Garrett survived his wife by almost a year. He died on September 26, 1884, at his summer home on the grounds of the Deer Park Hotel, which he, Senator Henry Gassaway Davis (a former B&O employee) and the B&O Railroad had developed in Garrett County, Maryland after the Civil War. Garrett was buried in Baltimore's Green Mount Cemetery.

Many of his B&O papers are held by the Smithsonian Institution; other family papers are held by the Library of Congress.

With succeeding generations, the Garrett family business expanded in railroads, shipping, and banking. Nine years after the Great Baltimore Fire of February 1904, the firm marked the city's (and financial district's) revival by building a landmark skyscraper of thirteen stories (tall for those days) designed by noted architects J.B. Noel Wyatt and William G. Nolting in a variety of then popular styles including the Chicago, Commercial/Vernacular and Renaissance Revival styles at the southwest corner of Water and South Streets. The firm, led by his descendants, endured into 1974, when it merged with its former rival, Alex. Brown & Sons. In 1981, a law firm which had long leased space in the building merged with another firm, Gordon, Feinblatt, Rothman, Hoffberger and Hollander; purchased The Garrett Building; and began and completed a substantial historically-minded restoration and renovation, which included placing the building on the National Register of Historic Places.

Places named in Garrett's honor include:

- Garrett, Indiana
- Garrett County, Maryland, the last of the state's 23 counties to be established, in 1872
- Garrett Island in the (Susquehanna River)
- Garrett Park (Montgomery County)
- Garrett, Pennsylvania

The Garrett Park recreation area in Baltimore City's Brooklyn neighborhood, on East Patapsco Avenue, between Second and Third Streets, was donated and named for John Work Garrett's grandson Robert Garrett, a member of the 1896 Olympics American team in Athens, Greece and a long-time recreation and parks leader in Baltimore City.

== See also ==
- List of railroad executives
