= Matthew Cullen =

Matthew Cullen may refer to:

- Matthew Cullen (bishop), in Ireland
- Matthew Cullen (miner), of Cullen Hotel and Keyser–Cullen House, Utah, USA

== See also ==
- Mathew Cullen, video and film director
- Cullen (disambiguation)
