= The Garrett Building =

- U.S. National Register of Historic Places
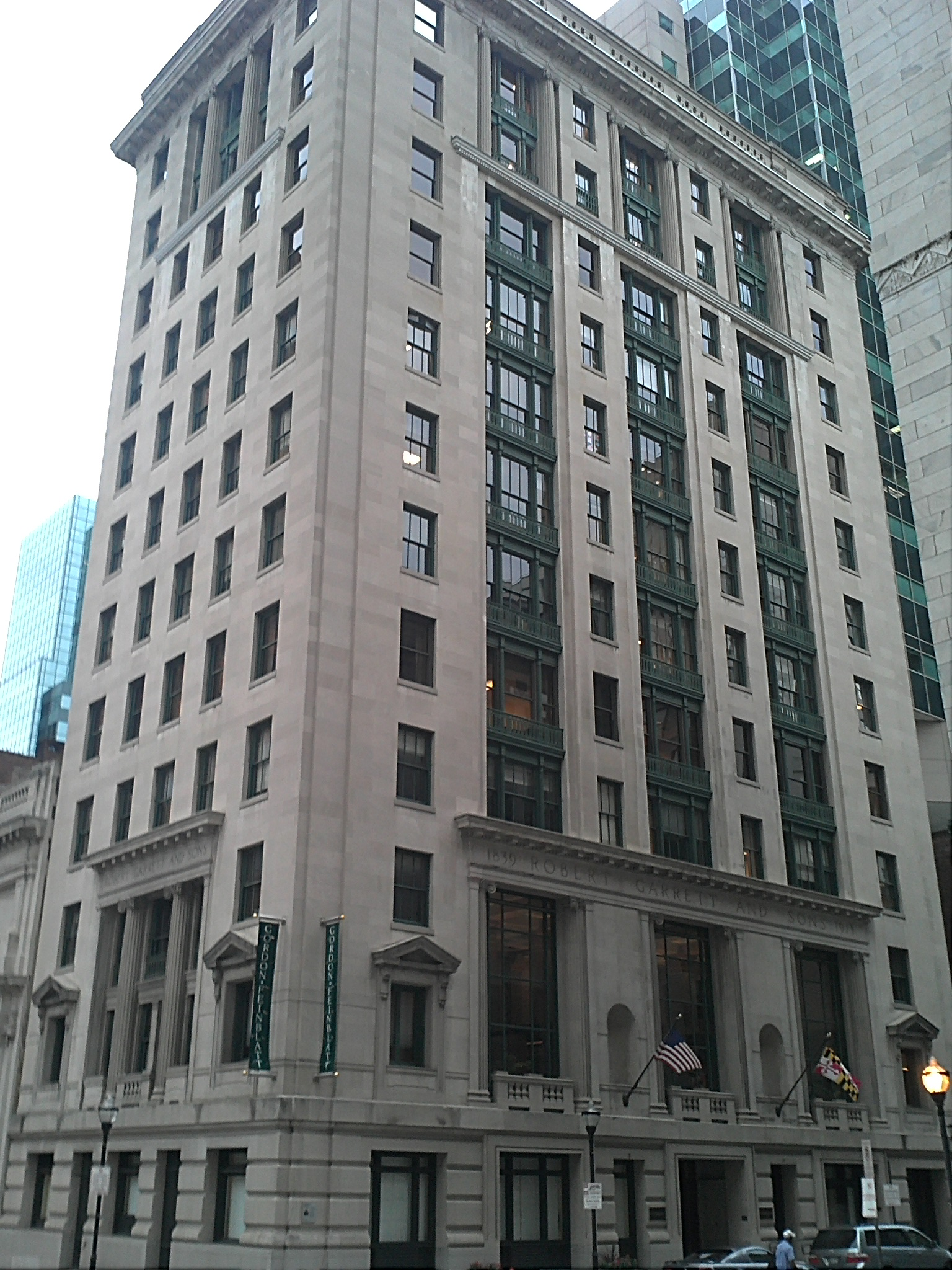
- Garrett Building, September 2012

- Location within Baltimore Location within Maryland Location within the United States
- Location: 233-239 Redwood St., Baltimore, Maryland
- Coordinates: 39°17′20″N 76°36′40″W
- Area: 0.1 acres (0.040 ha)
- Built: 1913
- Architect: Wyatt & Nolting
- Architectural style: Early Commercial, Renaissance
- NRHP reference No.: 82001586
- Added to NRHP: December 16, 1982

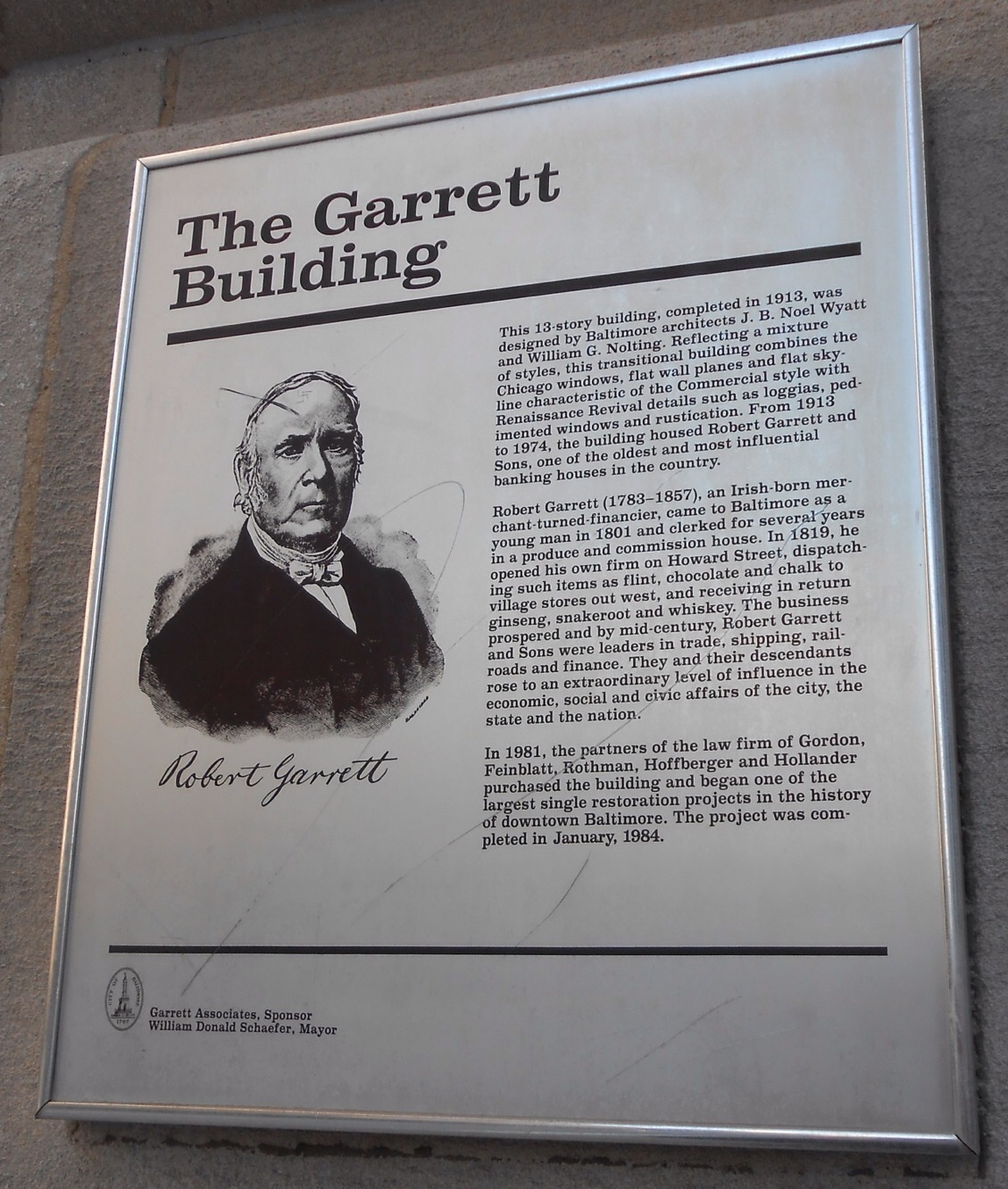
Robert Garrett was an Irish immigrant and merchant who started a financial firm, Garrett and Sons, in 1819.

The Garrett Building is a historic office building located at 233-239 Redwood Street, Baltimore, Maryland, United States. It is a 13-story, limestone faced skyscraper which combines the Commercial style with Renaissance Revival detailing. It was designed and built in 1913 by the Baltimore architects J.B. Noel Wyatt and William G. Nolting for the Garrett and Sons investment banking company, a leading Baltimore financial institution offering a wide variety of services in several cities.

== History ==
Robert Garrett was an Irish immigrant and merchant who came to Baltimore in 1801 and opened his financial firm in 1819. His son, John W. Garrett, was an American banker, philanthropist, and president of the Baltimore and Ohio Railroad (B&O), whose support for the Union was critical in the Civil War. He was a close confidante of Johns Hopkins and George Peabody. Robert Garrett's great-grandson, Robert Garrett was an Olympic athlete and prominent in Baltimore civic life in the 20th century. Robert Garrett & Sons resided there until 1974 when it merged with Alex. Brown & Sons.

The Baltimore law firm Gordon Feinblatt which had leased space in The Garrett Building since 1967, purchased the building in 1981 and then began one of the largest single restoration projects in the history of downtown Baltimore. The project was completed in January, 1984. The Garrett Building was home to Gordon Feinblatt LLC until April 19, 2021. The firm sold the building to Byrnes & Associates, Inc. at the end of October 2020.

The Garrett Building was listed on the National Register of Historic Places in 1982.
