= Pikesville Armory =

- U.S. National Register of Historic Places
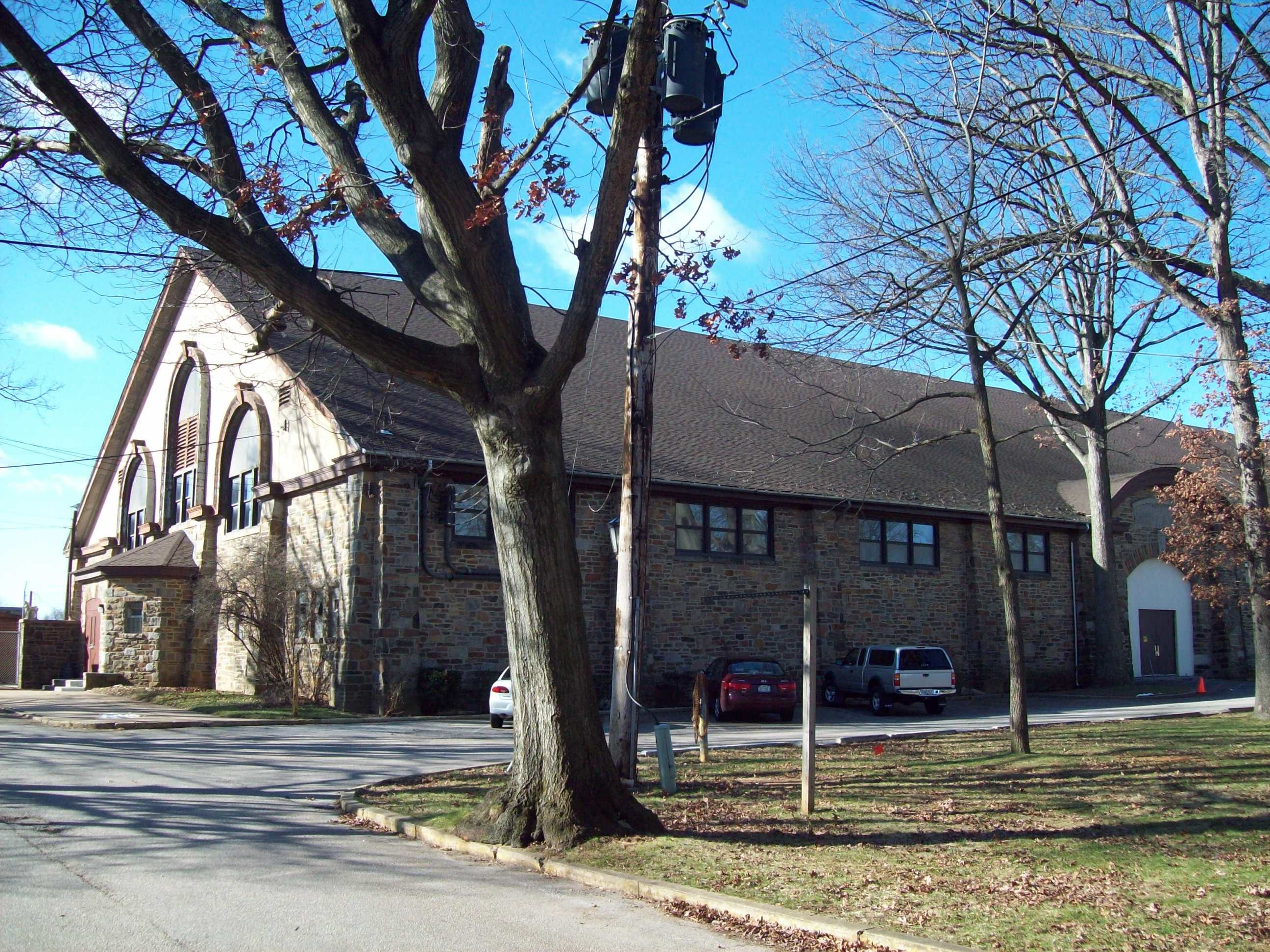
- Pikesville Armory, December 2009

- Location within Maryland Location within the United States
- Location: 610 Reisterstown Rd., Pikesville, Maryland
- Coordinates: 39°22′8″N 76°43′18″W
- Area: 10 acres (4.0 ha)
- Built: 1903
- Architect: Wyatt & Nolting
- MPS: Maryland National Guard Armories TR
- NRHP reference No.: 85002674
- Added to NRHP: September 25, 1985

The Pikesville Armory was built in 1903 to support the expansion of the National Guard program. The second-oldest armory in Maryland, it was designed by architects Wyatt and Nolting.

It was added to the National Register of Historic Places in 1985.
