= Keyser–Cullen House =

Historic house in Salt Lake City, Utah, U.S.

- U.S. National Register of Historic Places
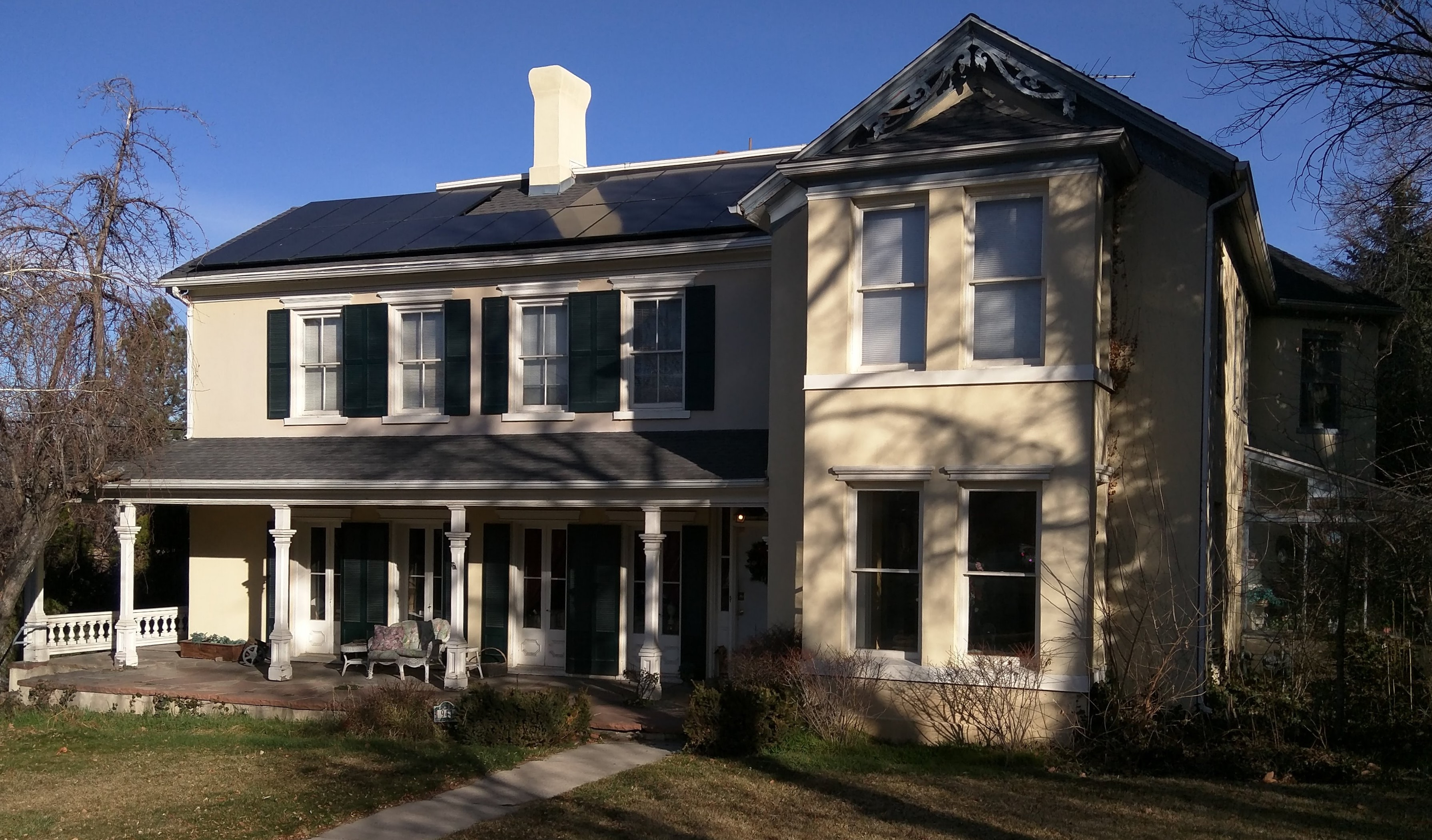

- Location within Utah
- Location: 941 East 500 South, Salt Lake City, Utah
- Coordinates: 40°45′32″N 111°51′48″W
- Area: 0.5 acres (0.20 ha)
- Built: 1879
- Architectural style: Gothic Revival, cross wing
- NRHP reference No.: 99001561
- Added to NRHP: December 9, 1999

The Keyser–Cullen House, at 941 East 500 South in Salt Lake City, Utah, was built in 1879. It was listed on the National Register of Historic Places in 1999.

It is a brick two-story cross-wing house. Its original section, a west-facing two-room-plan building was built in 1879; the wing extending to the west from that was added in the mid-1880s. It has a gabled roof, with bargeboard trim in the cross wing gable. It has some elements of Gothic Revival style.

It was built by and home of Aaron Keyser, a cattle baron and brewer, c. 1879–1883. Subsequently, it was home for 35 years for Matthew Cullen, silver miner and owner of Cullen Hotel in Salt Lake City.
