= Virginia Bank and Trust Building =

Historic commercial building in Virginia, United States

- U.S. National Register of Historic Places
- Virginia Landmarks Register
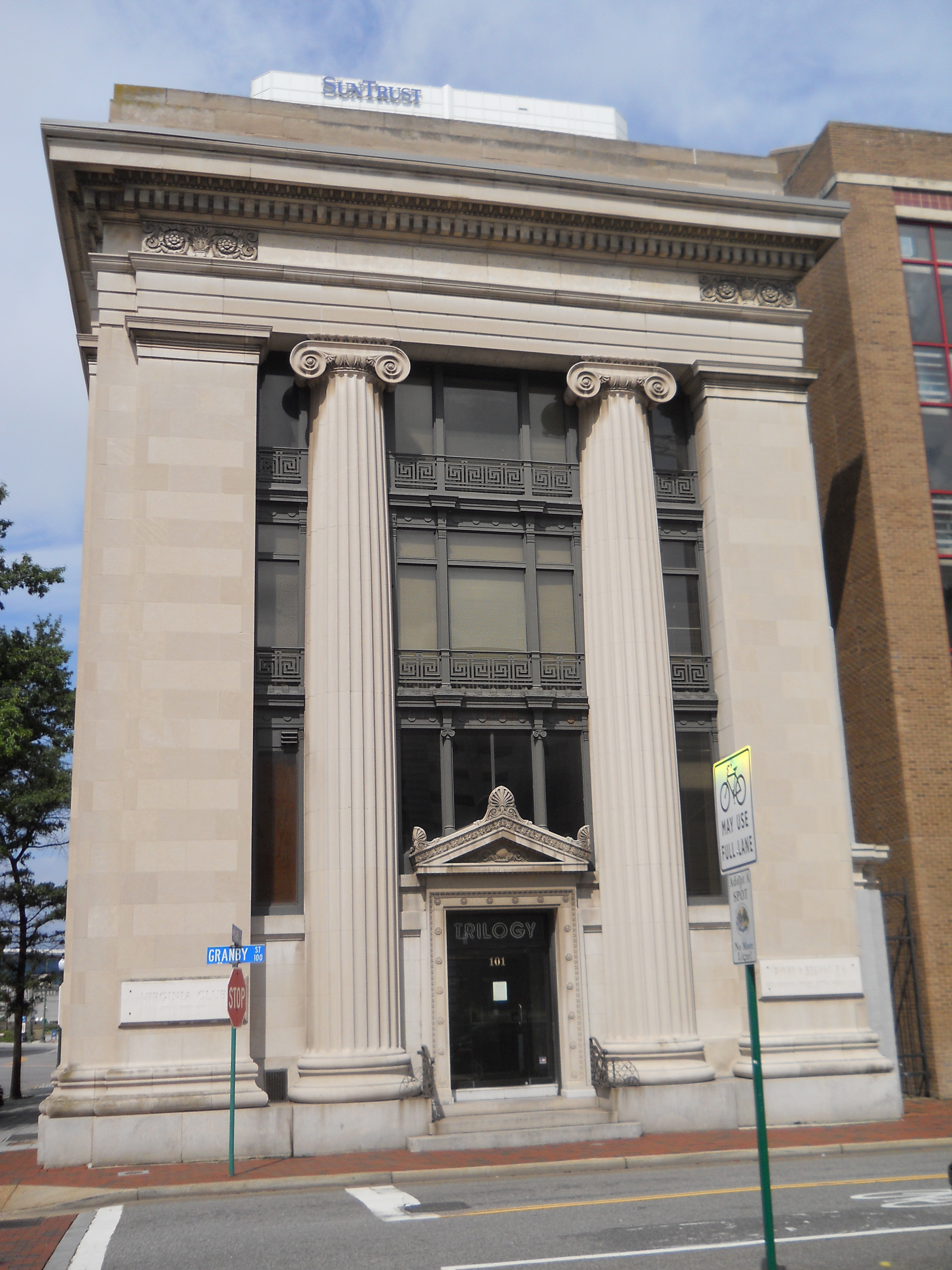
- Virginia Bank and Trust Building, September 2013

- Location within Virginia Location within the United States
- Location: 101 Granby St., Norfolk, Virginia
- Coordinates: 36°50′46″N 76°17′36″W
- Area: 0.1 acres (0.040 ha)
- Built: 1908-1909
- Architect: Wyatt & Nolting; Taylor & Hepburn
- Architectural style: Beaux Arts
- NRHP reference No.: 84003553
- VLR No.: 122-0078

Significant dates
- Added to NRHP: February 23, 1984
- Designated VLR: January 17, 1984

Virginia Bank and Trust Building, also known as the Auslew Gallery Building, is a historic bank building located at Norfolk, Virginia. It was designed by the architectural firm of Wyatt & Nolting and built in 1908–1909. It is a four-story, Beaux Arts style building. It features Doric order and Ionic order engaged columns and pilasters.

It was listed on the National Register of Historic Places in 1984.
