= Mary Garrett =

American suffragist and philanthropist (1854–1915)

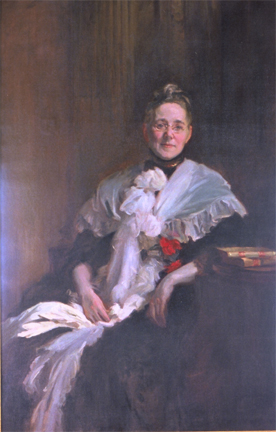
- Portrait by John Singer Sargent
- Born: Mary Elizabeth Garrett; March 5, 1854; Baltimore, Maryland, U.S.
- Died: April 3, 1915 (aged 61); Montgomery County, Pennsylvania, U.S.
- Resting place: Green Mount Cemetery; Baltimore, Maryland, U.S.
- Known for: Starting the Bryn Mawr School for Women in Baltimore Funding the Johns Hopkins Medical School
- Father: John W. Garrett

Mary Elizabeth Garrett (March 5, 1854 – April 3, 1915) was an American suffragist and philanthropist. She was the youngest child and only daughter of John W. Garrett, a philanthropist and president of the Baltimore and Ohio Railroad (B. & O.).

Well known for her "coercive philanthropy", Mary Garrett donated money to start the Johns Hopkins University Medical School in 1893 on the condition that the school would accept female students "on the same terms as men".

She founded Bryn Mawr School, a private college-preparatory school for girls in Baltimore, and generously donated to Bryn Mawr College of Pennsylvania with the requirement that her intimate friend Martha Carey Thomas be the president. Like many other suffragists of the nineteenth century, Garrett chose not to marry; instead, she kept a lifelong working and emotional relationship with Thomas. In her later years, she collaborated with her longtime friends Susan B. Anthony and Anna Howard Shaw to try to secure the right for women to vote in the United States.

== Biography ==
=== Childhood ===
Mary Elizabeth Garrett was born in Baltimore, Maryland on March 5, 1854. Both of her parents, John W. Garrett and Rachel Ann Harrison, came from prominent and wealthy Baltimore families. Mary was the only daughter and youngest child of John W. Garrett. She was the favored child of the family, and her father often said, "I wish Mary had been born a boy!" purportedly because he felt that Mary's potential was being suppressed by social barriers against women at the time.

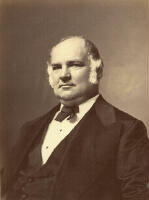
John W. Garrett (1820-1884), Mary's father

Mary Garrett was raised in a wealthy household. After her father was elected president of B&O Railroad, the Garrets moved into a mansion in Mount Vernon Place. Although living in a luxurious house in the most prosperous part of Baltimore, Garrett had a lonely and unhappy childhood. Her youngest brother was 5 years older than her, and the age difference made it difficult for her to connect with her brothers. Moreover, according to her memoir, she had serious trouble with the bone of her right ankle until she received effective treatment at the spas of Cape May.

Garrett learned about charitable works in her young age as both her parents and grandparents were involved in philanthropy. Furthermore, she eavesdropped on her father's conversations with famous politicians and businessmen at home, during the Civil War. She was also greatly influenced by other Maryland women, who offered significant assistance to Union soldiers during the Civil War by providing water, refreshments and nursing care.

=== School life and self-education ===
Garrett went to Miss Kummer's School when she was twelve. At school, she met two lifelong friends, Julia Rebecca Rogers, nicknamed "Dolly" and Elizabeth King, nicknamed "Bessie". Both Dolly and Bessie were from well-known families associated with the Garrett family in Baltimore. Dolly was the daughter of a steel magnate and became the legal ward of John W. Garrett after her father's death. Bessie, from a famous Quaker family, was the daughter of an associate of Mary's father. Mary was initially excited about school life and enjoyed it, but she gradually got bored because of her school's conservative stances toward girls' education. The school principal, who once had a very good relationship with Mary, believed "in cultivation, not in college." Also, the school restricted girls from studying science. In response to the restrictive school policy, the three girls formed their own study group to learn biological science, and dissected a rat to everyone's horror.

Disappointed with the lackluster experiences of school education, Mary quit school at age seventeen and never returned to school in the following years. She preferred to teach herself at home and read literary classics. With only self-education, she learned to speak fluent Italian and French and practiced German and Greek.

=== Adolescence ===
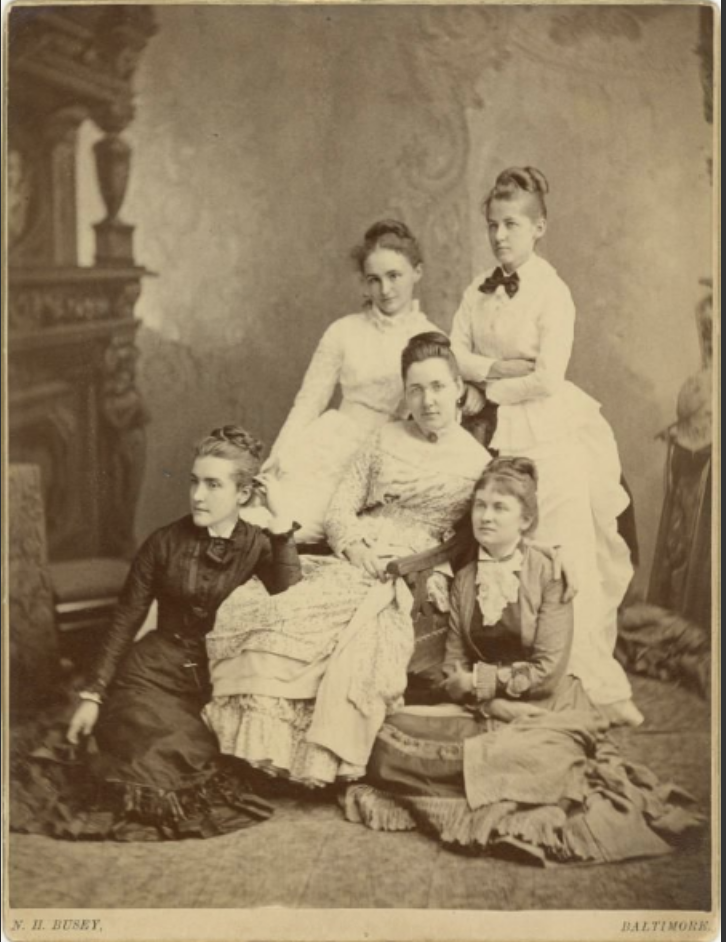
This is an image of the Friday Evening Meeting with Mamie Gwinn, Bessie King, Mary Garrett, M. Carey Thomas and Julia Rogers.

Adolescence was not a period of comfort and happiness for Garrett. She felt uncomfortable with the Victorian expectations of women at the time and was also uncomfortable with the attitude towards sex in her family. Every family member avoided sex-related topics on purpose, and she had to teach herself about puberty.

Garrett showed interests in business and managed her personal business matters by herself during this time period. Given a weekly allowance of five to ten dollars per week, she kept record of all expenses in her notebook. Besides, she kept all the letters from her relatives and friends, including Julia and Elizabeth.

Garrett also kept a diary, which was given to her by the philanthropist and longtime friend of the Garret family, George Peabody, the respectable founder of the Peabody Institute and George Peabody Library in Baltimore.

After leaving school, she continued to learn from her father about commerce and the operation of a railroad company, later serving as his secretary.

=== Adulthood ===
Garrett and her friends, including M. Carey Thomas, Mamie Gwinn, Elizabeth "Bessie" King, and Julia Rogers, were known as the "Friday Evening" because of their bi-weekly meetings on Friday nights. Through collective effort, the members of "The Friday Evening" started the Bryn Mawr School for Girls in Baltimore, 1885. It was an elite preparatory institution for girls, named after the famous women's college, Bryn Mawr College of Pennsylvania. Garrett was the major financial supporter of the new school.

Later on, Garrett shifted her focus to medical education. At the age of 22, she requested special permission from Daniel Coit Gilman, the first president of the Johns Hopkins University, to enroll in Johns Hopkins University, but was denied entrance due in part to her status as a woman. However, her opportunity to establish justice came soon after. When the Johns Hopkins School of Medicine was under construction in the late nineteenth century, the school board quickly ran out of the original endowment from Johns Hopkins. Garrett and her friends founded the Women's Medical School Fund Committee and promised to make up for the deficit provided that women were accepted "on the same terms as men." The condition was accepted by the school board, and since then, medical education had become more and more accessible to females. Garrett was also hugely involved in Women's suffrage movement, working with her friends Anna Howard Shaw, Julia Ward Howe, and Susan B. Anthony and serving as a major benefactor of the movement.

Garrett spent her final years at the Bryn Mawr College with M. Carey Thomas. Thomas and Garrett shared the same campus home, "the Deanery" at Bryn Mawr.

== Career ==
=== Secretary ===
Prior to inheriting a fortune of about $2 million following her father's death, Garrett worked as a personal secretary for her father, John W. Garrett. She thus had opportunities to meet with many business magnates in America, including Andrew Carnegie, J. P. Morgan, William Henry Vanderbilt, and Jay Gould. This experience exposed Mary to professional finance and endowed her with the skills to be an effective negotiator and businesswoman.

=== Philanthropist ===
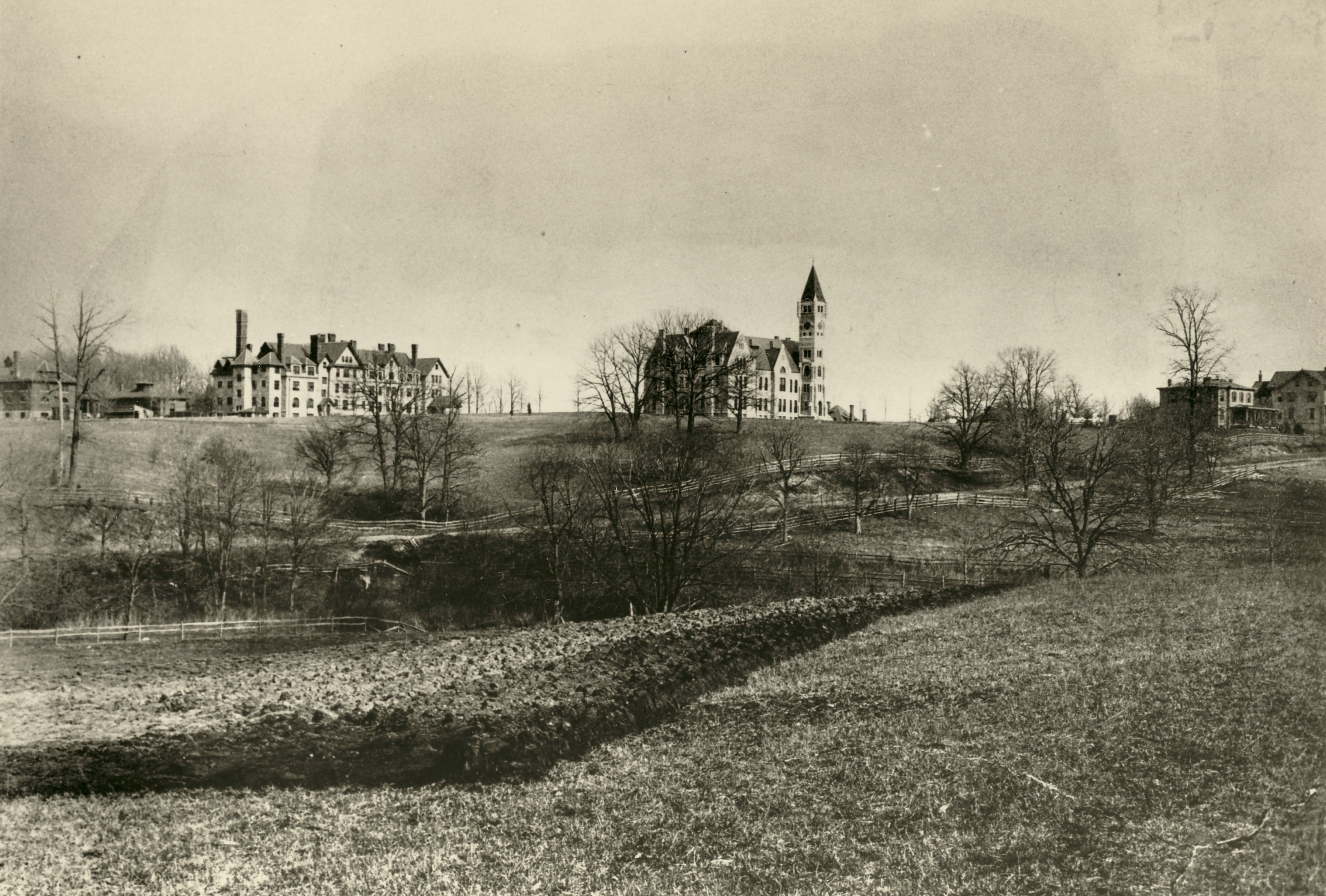
Bryn Mawr College

==== Founding the Bryn Mawr School for Girls ====
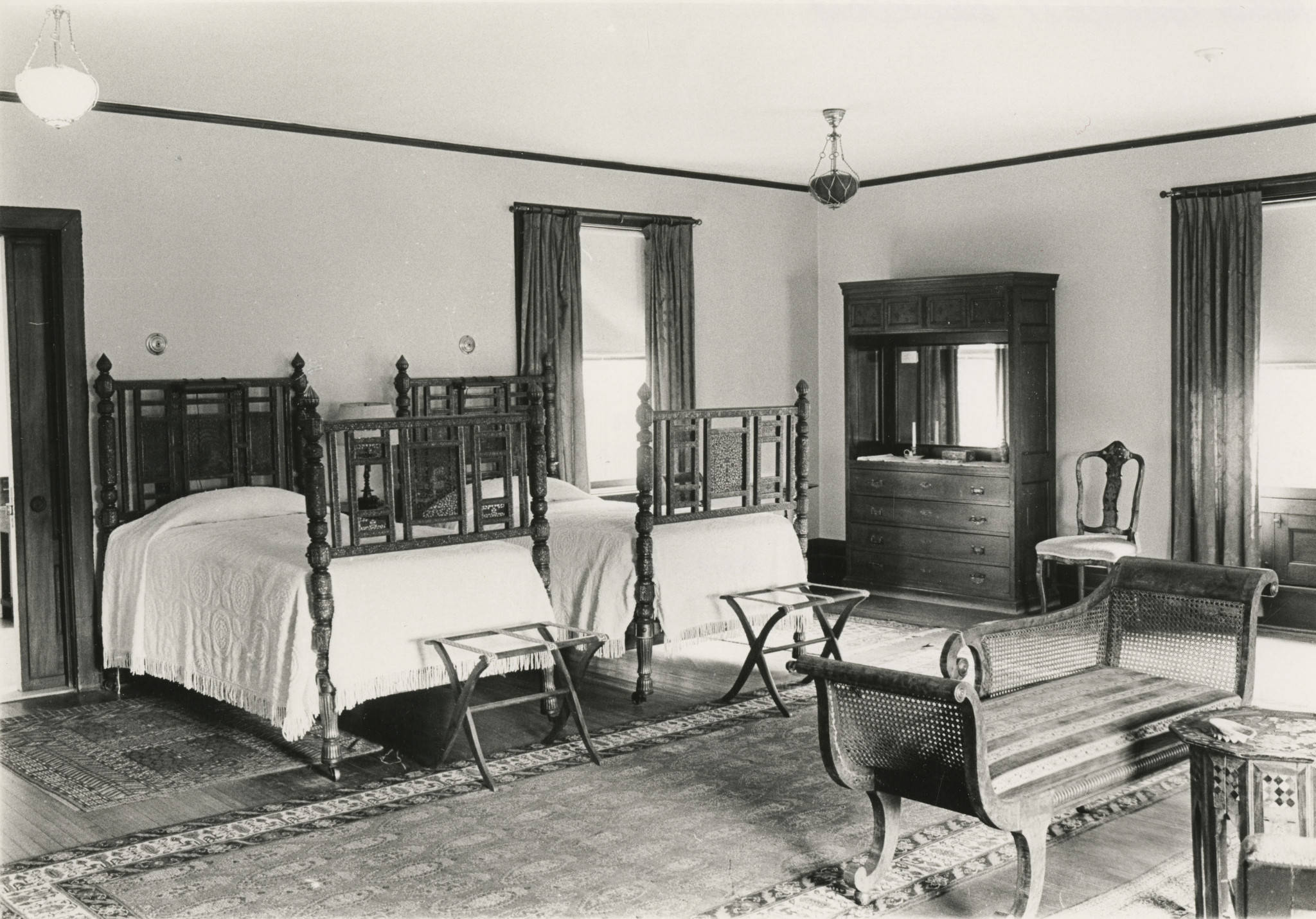
Miss Garrett's Bedroom in Bryn Mawr College, 1968

Using her inherited wealth, Garrett helped found the Bryn Mawr School for Girls in Baltimore, so named to reference the already-popular Bryn Mawr College of Pennsylvania, which focused on scholastic achievement in traditionally male-dominated disciplines, such as mathematics and science. She spent over $500,000 on the construction and decoration of the school, and she supervised much of the construction processes. Although she was greatly hailed for her work, her donations were also controversial at the time and sometimes criticized for breaking social norms. Women at the time were expected and restricted to be good housekeepers, mothers, and wives. Thus, the great amount of money invested to raise the standard of women's education seemed like a waste, since women would eventually stay at home and do household chores. For instance, "The Kitchen Magazine asked, 'Why does not Miss Garrett or some other philanthropist invest a quarter of a million dollars in a model school of domestic economy, in which we prepare girls for housekeeping and homemaking,' adding that 'without thoroughly trained, competent housekeepers it is a folly to hope for well-trained, pleasant homes.'"

==== Enriching the Bryn Mawr College of Pennsylvania ====
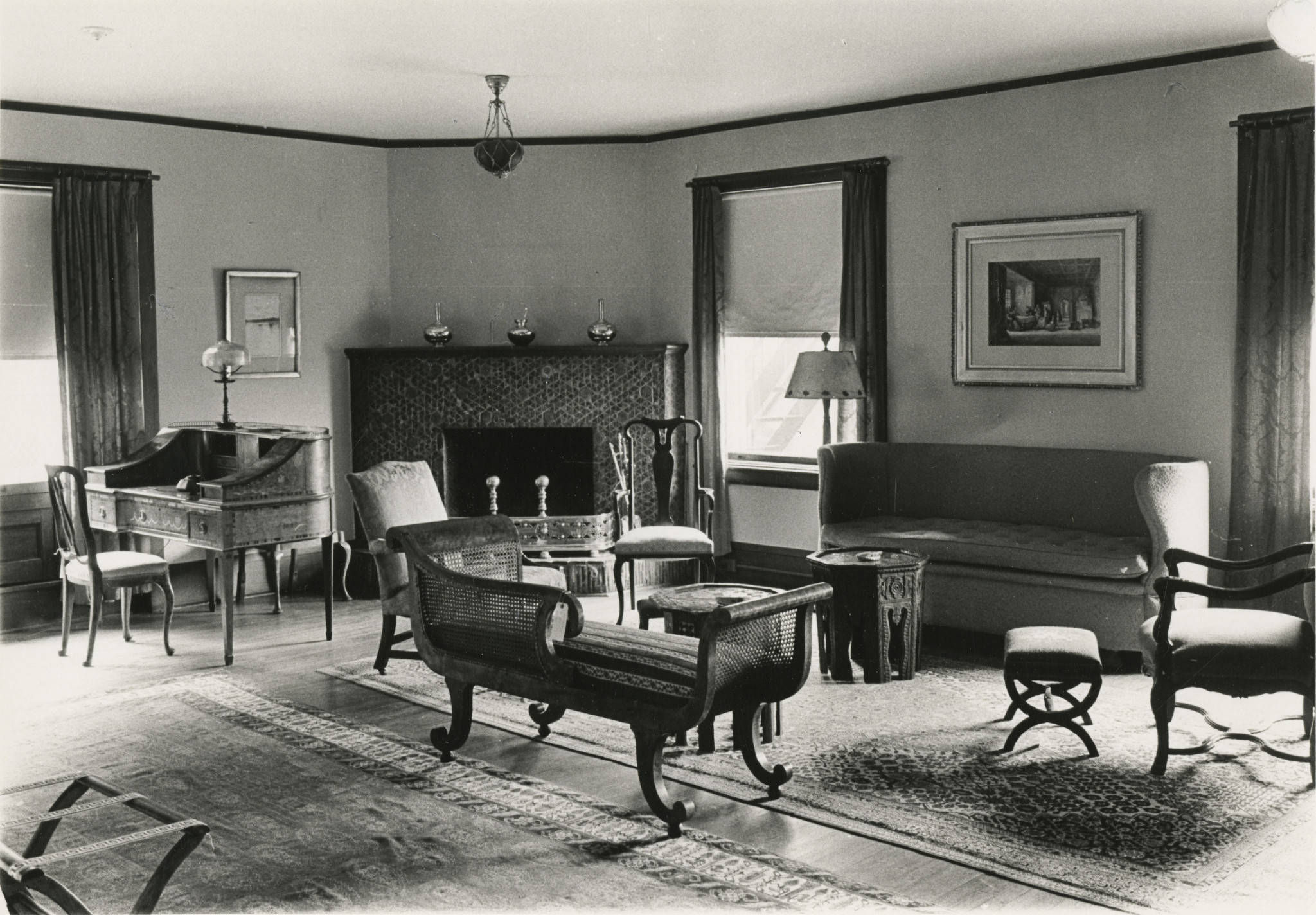
Miss Garrett's Bedroom in Bryn Mawr College, 1968

Garrett enriched Bryn Mawr College, donating $10,000 per year to help the college and pay all the bills of the school on the condition that M. Carey Thomas be the president. She redesigned the Deanery, home of the school president and employed Frederick Law Olmsted, the designer of New York's Central Park and the campus of Stanford University, to help with the campus plan.

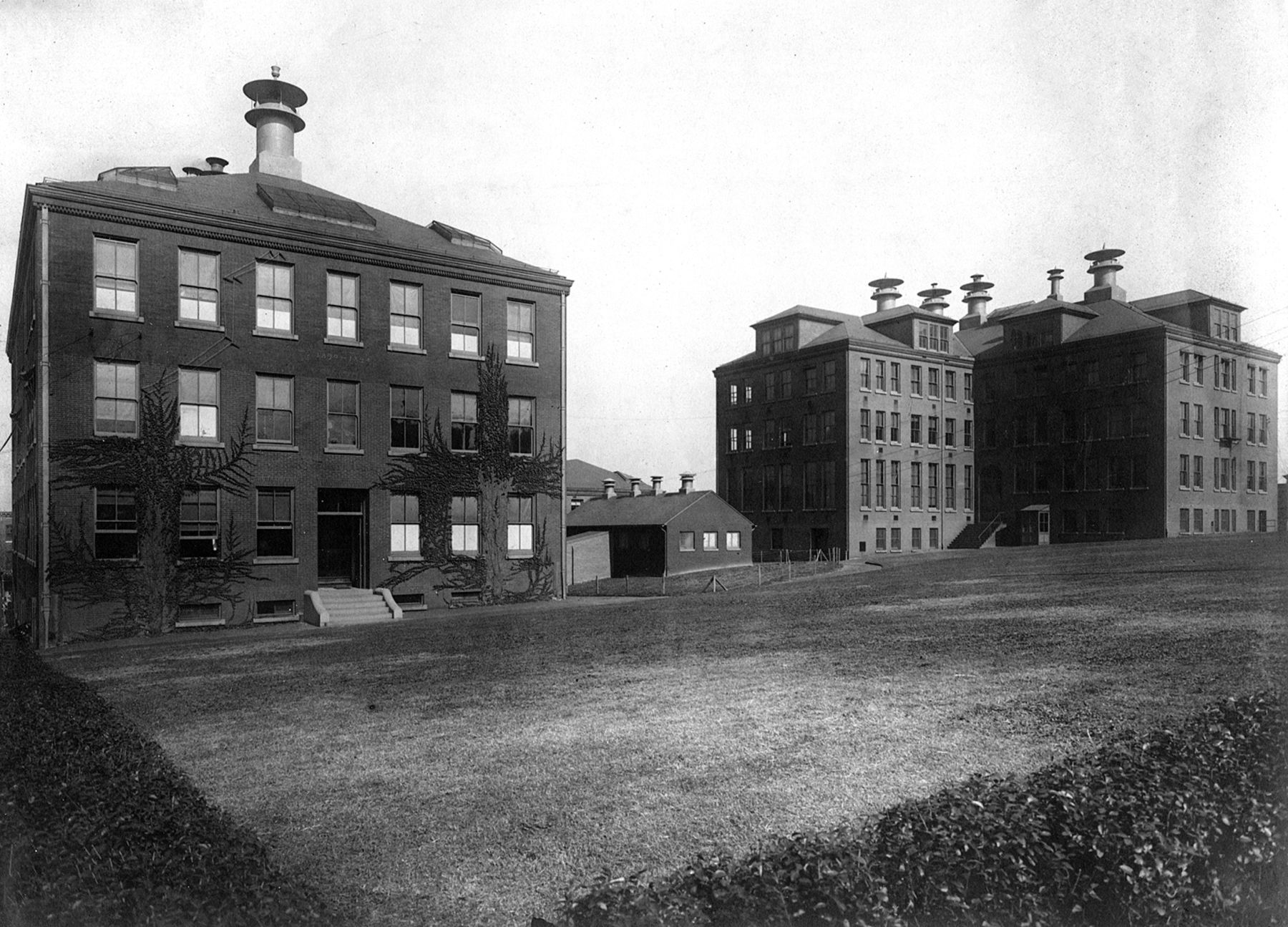
The Women's Fund Memorial Building of Johns Hopkins Medical School (Left), photo taken in 1912

==== Funding the establishment of the Johns Hopkins Medical School ====
Alan Chesney, dean emeritus of the Johns Hopkins School of Medicine, describes Garrett's role by writing: "For to this lady, more than any other single person, save only Johns Hopkins himself, does the School of Medicine owe its being." Garrett endowed the Johns Hopkins Medical School with a great sum of money. At first, the president of Johns Hopkins University, Daniel Coit Gilman requested $100,000 to open the medical school, but he increased this amount to $500,000 even before the Women's Medical School Fund committee (WMSF) started to raise the money. The trustees of the WMSF, many of whom were daughters of members of the Johns Hopkins University board of trustees, had a strong incentive to fund a Hopkins initiative. They reached the goal of raising $100,000 after two years of work, but the balance, more than $300,000, seemed intimidating. Garrett, failing to secure additional funding and disappointed by the WMSF trustees, finally donated $306,977 by herself to the medical school. She paid annual installments of $50,000 and also a 5% interest rate to the school until all the needed money was received by the school.

Garrett set forth six extremely stringent conditions for acceptance of her gift:

1. First and foremost, she insisted that a "Women's Fund Memorial Building" be built in memory of the women who contributed to the higher education.
2. Second, she required that 'women "enjoy all the advantages on the same terms as men" as well as "all prizes, dignities, or honors" that were afforded male students.'
3. Third, She added the date October 28, 1890, when the trustees of Johns Hopkins agreed to accept female students, to the school calendar.
4. Fourth, she insisted that the medical school be exclusively a graduate school as an integral part of the Johns Hopkins University. According to her conditions, the medical school should only provide a four-year course, "leading to the Doctor of Medicine".
5. Fifth, she established rigorous academic standards, insisting that the students have a background not only in the sciences but also in foreign languages, i.e. French and German.
6. Finally, she required that students should pass examinations based on the medical courses and studies in order to receive their degrees.

Garrett set the admission standards according to the highly praised European standards of medical education. Gilman was very concerned about the more rigorous academic standards. In the late nineteenth century, most of the medical schools in the United States were "small profit-making enterprises" owned by the faculties. The medical schools sold medical degrees to whoever paid the tuition fee. No preliminary education was required for admission. When Harvard University and University of Pennsylvania raised the academic standards earlier, they faced a revenue drop as fewer students were qualified for admission. The precarious financial situation of Hopkins worried Gilman; he could not afford a new financial dilemma. He tried to convince Garrett to lower her standards but failed. Through negotiations, Garrett finally agreed to modify two paragraphs of her terms, emphasizing that her terms of gift "would not interfere with the operation of the university". She also added that the university could modify the admission requirement, but the standard should remain the same. On February 20, 1893, she approved the statement and terms and signed the Requirements of Admission. By forcing the university to accept females on the same basis as males and increasing the admission requirements, Garrett made Johns Hopkins School of Medicine the first co-educational, graduate-level medical school in the United States.

=== Suffragist ===
Garrett was heavily involved in the Women's Suffrage Movement in her adulthood. She hosted the National American Woman Suffrage Association's 1906 convention in her Mount Vernon home. Attendees included Baltimore college women and notable suffragists, like Susan B. Anthony.

She also served as the financial chair of the National College Equal Suffrage League from 1908 to 1914. Garrett continued to donate heavily to the suffrage movement, giving $10,000~$20,000 annually, and actively participated in Women's Suffrage events, such as the 1912 Baltimore suffrage parade. Women in the United States were lawfully given the right to vote five years after Garrett's death.

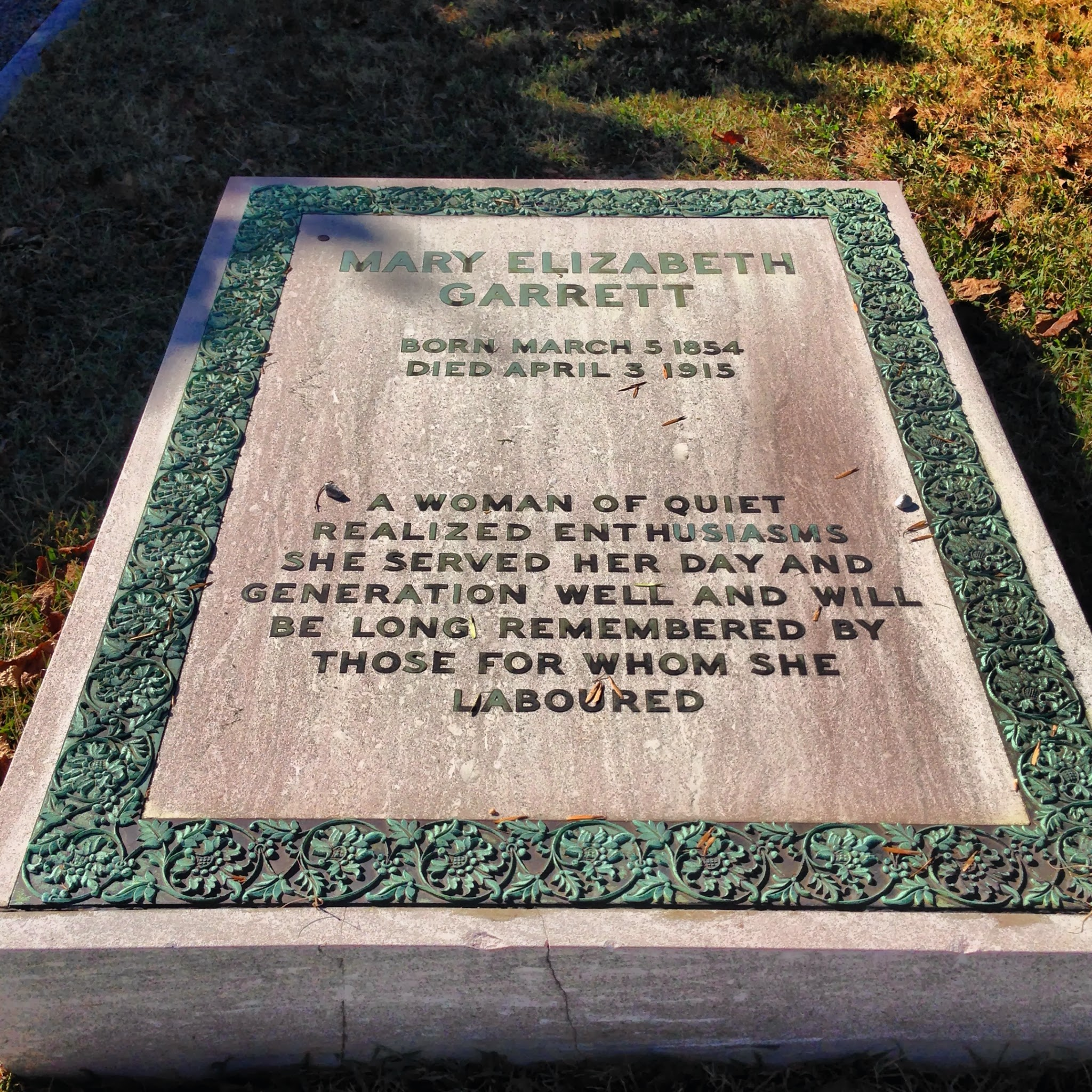
Gravesite of Mary Garrett in Baltimore's Green Mount Cemetery

== Death ==
Garrett died at Bryn Mawr College of leukemia on April 3, 1915, at age 61. She was buried in Baltimore's Green Mount Cemetery, next to her father. She left most of her funds and properties including the Mount Vernon mansion to M. Carey Thomas in her will.

== Legacy ==
In October 1893, after accepting Garrett's terms and conditions of her gift, the Johns Hopkins University School of Medicine admitted three women students for the first time. By June 21, 2000, 1547 women had graduated from the Johns Hopkins University School of Medicine. Famous women graduates include Florence Rena Sabin, Dorothy Reed Mendenhall, and Helen B. Taussig.

The Bryn Mawr School for Girls was established by Garrett and her friends. Notable alumnae of Bryn Mawr School include Julia Randall, Mildred Natwick, and Léonie Gilmour.

== See also ==
- John Work Garrett
- Martha Carey Thomas
- Bryn Mawr School
- Bryn Mawr College Deanery
- Bryn Mawr College
