= Gordon Feinblatt =

Coordinates: 39°17′2.5″N 76°35′58″W

Gordon Feinblatt LLC
- No. of attorneys: 73
- Key people: Michele Bresnick Walsh (Chairman & CEO), Todd R. Chason (Managing Member), & Robyn Seabrease (Executive Director)
- Date founded: 1953
- Founder: David P. Gordon, Eugene M. Feinblatt, and Donald N. Rothman
- Company type: Limited Liability Company
- Website: https://www.gfrlaw.com/

Gordon Feinblatt is a Baltimore, Maryland based law firm. The office is in Inner Harbor East. As of 2026, the firm has more than 70 attorneys and over 140 employees.

Founded in 1953, Gordon Feinblatt provides legal services, including but not limited to, Bankruptcy & Restructuring, Business, Energy & Environmental, Litigation, Estate Planning, Healthcare, as well as Real Estate. The firm and its attorneys have appeared in legal ranking publications, including Chambers and Partners, Best Lawyers, Super Lawyers, and the Baltimore Magazine.

Gordon Feinblatt has also reported involvement in the neighboring community. These activities include pro bono legal work and support for non-profit organizations in the Baltimore area. The firm identifies diversity, inclusion, equity, sustainability, and community engagement as components of its Corporate Social Responsibility program.

== History ==
Gordon Feinblatt originated from several Baltimore law practices that were established in the mid-20^{th} century. In 1946, the firm Byrnes & Gordon was formed by Judge William L. Byrnes and David P. Gordon, following their earlier association at Tydings, Sauerwein, Levy & Archer. Simultaneously, Judge Simon E. Sobeloff, prior to serving in public positions (Solicitor General of the United States and Chief Judge of the U.S. Court of Appeals for the Fourth Circuit), practiced privately at The Sobeloff Firm with associates Eugene M. Feinblatt and Donald N. Rothman. After Judge Byrnes and Judge Sobeloff left for judicial appointments in 1952, David P. Gordon, Eugene M. Feinblatt, and Donald N. Rothman combined their practices to form Gordon and Feinblatt in 1953. The firm was renamed Gordon Feinblatt and Rothman in 1956. It expanded further in 1972, through a merger with the Baltimore firm, Hoffberger & Hollander and became Gordon, Feinblatt, Rothman, Hoffberger & Hollander. Effective January 1, 2012, the firm changed its name to Gordon Feinblatt LLC.

== Leadership ==
- Barry Rosen was elected Chair and Chief Executive Officer of Gordon Feinblatt in 1989 and served in that role until the end of July 2024.
- Herbert Goldman was the Managing Member of Gordon Feinblatt from 1980 to 2012, before Michael C. Powell became the Managing Member at the firm. Todd R. Chason was then elected Managing Member and General Counsel in 2019. As of 2026, Chason remains in both roles.
- In 2020, Gordon Feinblatt sold The Garrett Building, which was listed on the National Register of Historic Places in 1982. The firm had resided in the building since 1967, purchasing it in 1981. Prior to the move, Gordon Feinblatt had restored the structure to its historic appearance.
- In 2022, Alexandria K. Montanio, Esq. became Gordon Feinblatt’s Director of Corporate Social Responsibility. According to The Daily Record, Montanio oversees diversity, equity, inclusion, community engagement, and sustainability efforts at the firm.
- In 2024, Michele Bresnick Walsh was the first woman elected Chair and Chief Executive Officer at Gordon Feinblatt.

== Practice Areas ==
Bankruptcy & Restructuring, Benefits/ERISA, Business, Digital Assets, EMERGE, Employment, Energy & Environmental, Family, Financial Services, Government Relations, Healthcare, Litigation, Mergers & Acquisitions, Personal Injury, Real Estate, Securities, Tax, Technology & Intellectual Property, Trusts & Estates.

== Recognition ==
- 34 Gordon Feinblatt attorneys were named in Maryland Super Lawyers 2026
- 10 Gordon Feinblatt attorneys & six areas of practice are ranked by Chambers & Partners
- 39 Gordon Feinblatt attorneys were named in Best Lawyers in America 2026, with 10 designated as “ones to watch” in Baltimore
- 21 Gordon Feinblatt attorneys were named in Baltimore Magazine’s Top Lawyers for 2026
- Gordon Feinblatt placed third and first in the large employer category for “Best Places to Work” in 2023 and 2025, respectively. The firm’s published materials identify quality, integrity, collegiality, selflessness, commitment, diversity, trust, and confidence as stated values.

== Corporate Social Responsibility ==
- Diversity, Equity, and Inclusion (DEI)
  - Firm Inclusion: The firm states this is to develop a company culture where each employee can be their best professional self while remaining true to their identity, where feedback is encouraged, and appropriate balance and integration of work and other responsibilities is respected.
  - Recruiting & Retention: Gordon Feinblatt notes that it has a focus on ensuring the firm’s recruitment efforts and hiring process include and welcome candidates from diverse backgrounds and identities at all stages of the process, resulting in a workforce where colleagues embody many diverse identities.
  - Gordon Feinblatt has sponsored the Maryland Law Black Law Student Association Alternative Dispute Resolution Team since 2018 and the University of Baltimore Black Law Student Association Alternative Dispute Resolution Team since 2026. The teams have won two national titles at the National Black Student Association Nelson Mandela International Negotiation Competition.
  - The firm has been sponsoring the Maryland Law LEAP scholars’ program since 2019.
- Community Engagement
  - Gordon Feinblatt attorneys and staff provide pro bono legal counseling, monetary support, and volunteer services at 100+ non-profit organizations in the area, including:
    - Back on My Feet, Baltimore Symphony Orchestra, Cristo Rey Jesuit High School, Enoch Pratt Free Library, House of Ruth, Kennedy Krieger Institute, Maryland Food Bank, Teach for America, Meals on Wheels, University of Maryland Francis King Carey School of Law
- Sustainability Initiatives
  - Gordon Feinblatt completed the All-Legal Industry Sustainability Standards (ALISS) self-assessment in 2021 to evaluate its environmental practices.
  - The firm notes that it has partnered with Compost Crew to reduce waste sent to landfills and installed two BEVI water machines to reduce single use plastic.
