= Liriodendron (Bel Air, Maryland) =

Historic house in Maryland, US

- U.S. National Register of Historic Places
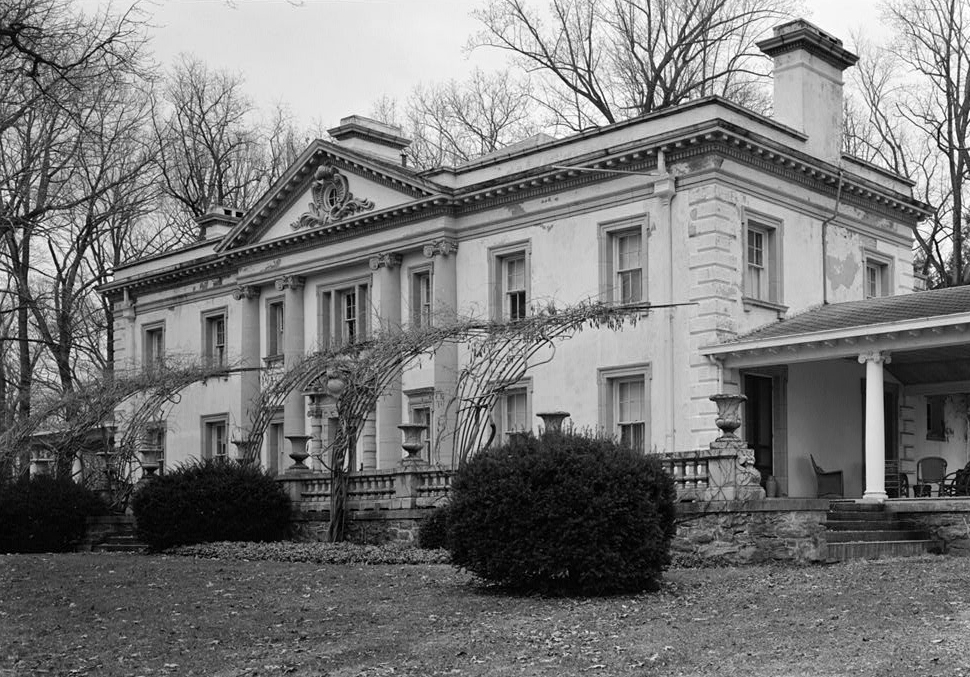
- Liriodendron in 1980

- Location within Maryland Location within the United States
- Location: 501 and 502 W. Gordon St., Bel Air, Maryland
- Coordinates: 39°32′1″N 76°21′40″W
- Area: 48.2 acres (19.5 ha)
- Built: 1835
- Architects: Wyatt & Nolting; J. Kift & Son
- Architectural style: Colonial Revival, Georgian Revival
- NRHP reference No.: 80001816
- Added to NRHP: September 27, 1980

Liriodendron is a historic home and estate located at Bel Air, Harford County, Maryland, United States. It was the summer home of Laetitia and Dr Howard Kelly, a successful surgeon and founding member of the Johns Hopkins Medical College, and comprises the mansion named Liriodendron; the Graybeal-Kelly House; a c. 1835 bank barn; a c. 1898 carriage house; a c. 1850 board-and-batten cottage; and five other outbuildings including a corn crib, a smokehouse, two ice houses, and a shed. The 2 1/2-story, stuccoed brick mansion was designed by the Baltimore architectural firm of Wyatt and Nolting in the Georgian Revival style and constructed about 1898. The 2 1/2-story Georgian-style Graybeal-Kelly House, built about 1835, was the manor house for the farm until the mansion was constructed. It is used as a wedding, conference, and arts facility.

Liriodendron was listed on the National Register of Historic Places in 1980.
