= Fifth Regiment Armory =

- U.S. National Register of Historic Places
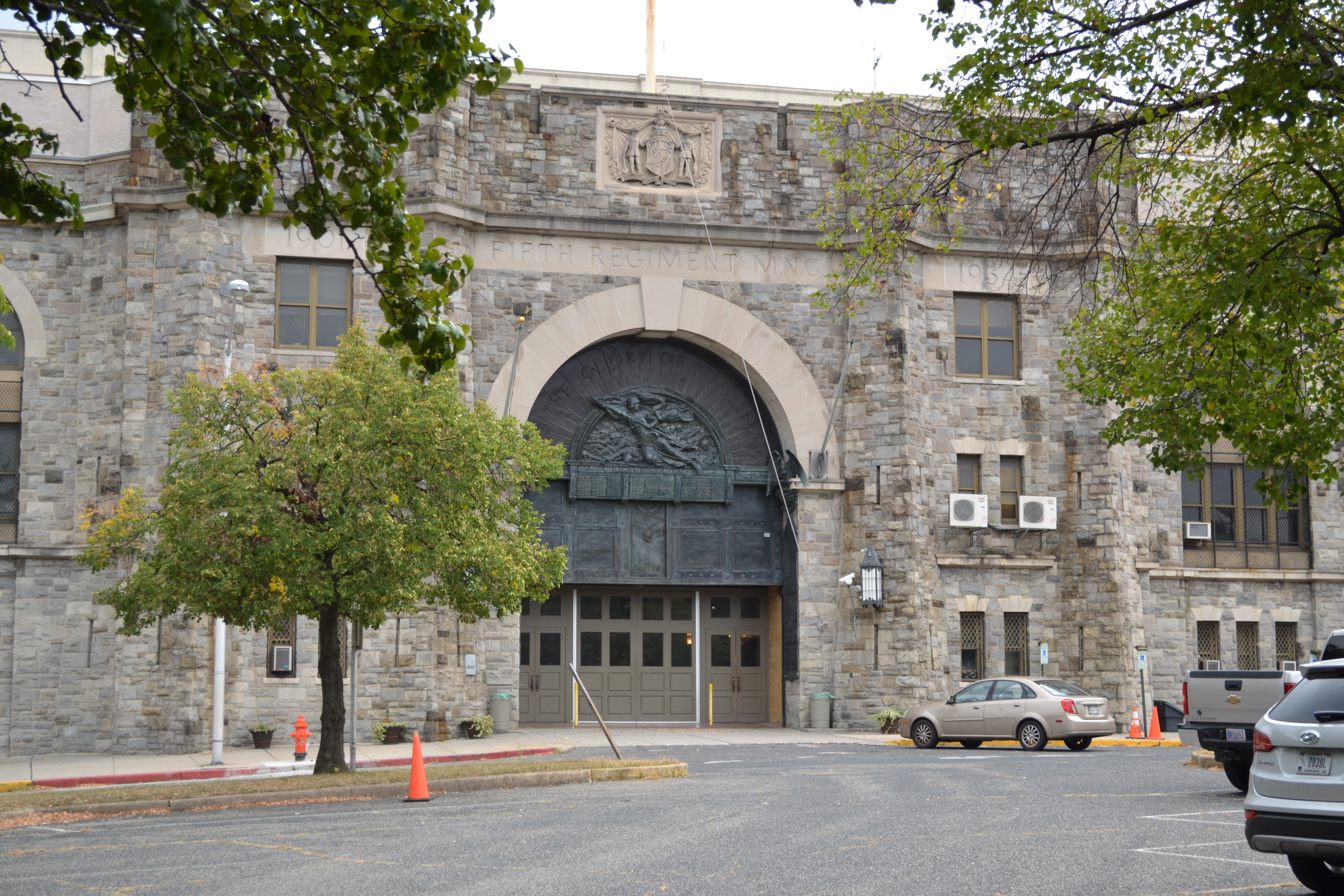

- Location within Baltimore Location within Maryland Location within the United States
- Location: 29th Division St., Baltimore, Maryland
- Coordinates: 39°18′12″N 76°37′19″W
- Area: 1.2 acres (0.49 ha)
- Built: 1901
- Architect: Wyatt & Nolting
- MPS: Maryland National Guard Armories TR
- NRHP reference No.: 85002671
- Added to NRHP: September 25, 1985

The Fifth Regiment Armory is a historic National Guard armory built in Baltimore, Maryland, United States in 1901. The Armory is a fortress-type structure situated in midtown Baltimore. It consists of a full basement, a first floor containing a 200 foot by 300 foot drill hall, a mezzanine or "balcony" level, and a newer second level (reconstructed in 1933 after a fire) housing the trussed steel drill hall roof. The façade features buttresses, parapets, casement windows, and a crenellated roofline, giving the appearance of a medieval fortification. It was the site of the 1912 Democratic National Convention.

The Fifth Regiment Armory was designed by architects Wyatt & Nolting. It was listed on the National Register of Historic Places in 1985. It is included within the Baltimore National Heritage Area.

On October 31, 1958, President Dwight Eisenhower delivered a televised speech from the Fifth Regiment Armory. The event, promoting Republican Party candidates in that year's midterm elections, was attended by Maryland Governor Theodore McKeldin, Senator John Glenn Beall, Jr., Senator John Marshall Butler, and Congressman James Devereux.

== Museum ==
The Maryland Museum of Military History, housed at the Armory, collects artifacts and runs programming related to Maryland's militias, dating back to Colonial times, and present-day branches of the military.
