= Sabillasville, Maryland =

- Census-designated place
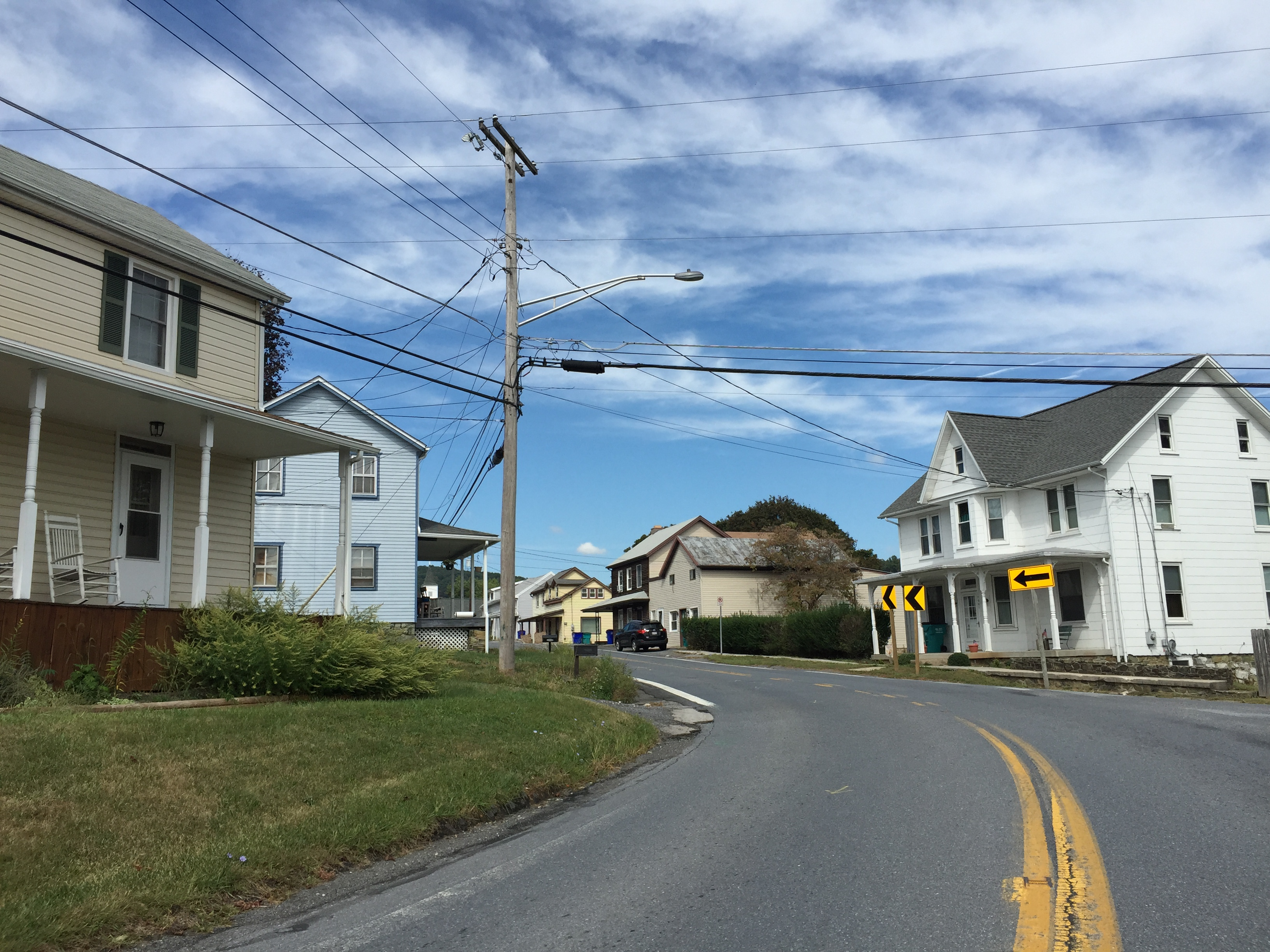
- MD 550 through Sabillasville

- Location in Maryland Sabillasville (the United States)
- Coordinates: 39°41′58″N 77°27′26″W
- Country: United States
- State: Maryland
- County: Frederick

Area
  - Total: 1.67 sq mi (4.33 km^{2})
  - Land: 1.67 sq mi (4.33 km^{2})
  - Water: 0 sq mi (0.00 km^{2})
- Elevation: 1,122 ft (342 m)

Population (2020)
  - Total: 470
  - Density: 281.0/sq mi (108.49/km^{2})
- Time zone: UTC−5 (Eastern (EST))
  - Summer (DST): UTC−4 (EDT)
- ZIP code: 21780
- Area codes: 301, 240
- FIPS code: 24-69200
- GNIS feature ID: 2629805

Sabillasville is an unincorporated community and census-designated place in Frederick County, Maryland, United States. As of the 2010 census it had a population of 354.

The Victor Cullen School Power House was listed on the National Register of Historic Places in 1987 and the Victor Cullen Center, Old Administration Building was listed in 1990.

== History ==
The first European settlers to arrive in the vicinity of Sabillasville were Swiss immigrants in the late-1750s. Among the earliest settlers was Peter Zollinger (or Zullinger), who owned the land on which the present-day village is located. In 1813, the village was laid out by Andrew Smith and named Sabillasville in honor of Savilla Zollinger (wife of Peter). In 1872, the Western Maryland Railroad reached Sabillasville on its line leading from Baltimore to Hagerstown and the surrounding area soon developed into a summer resort called Pen Mar (a portmanteau of Pennsylvania and Maryland).

== Geography ==
The town is located in the northwest corner of Frederick County at an elevation of 1,100 feet (340 m) above sea level, in the Harbaugh Valley, between South Mountain to the northwest and Wertenbaker Hill to the southeast. Route 550 passes through the town, leading northwest 2 miles (3 km) to Blue Ridge Summit, Pennsylvania, and southeast 7 miles (11 km) to Thurmont.

According to the U.S. Census Bureau, the Sabillasville CDP has an area of 1.5 square miles (3.9 km^{2}), all land.

== Demographics ==
Historical population
Census	Pop.	Note	%±
2010	354		—
2020	470		32.8%
U.S. Decennial Census

== Education ==
It is in Frederick County Public Schools.

School zoning is as follows: It is zoned to Thurmont Primary School, Thurmont Elementary School, Thurmont Middle School, and Catoctin High School.
