= Victor Cullen Center, Old Administration Building =

- U.S. National Register of Historic Places
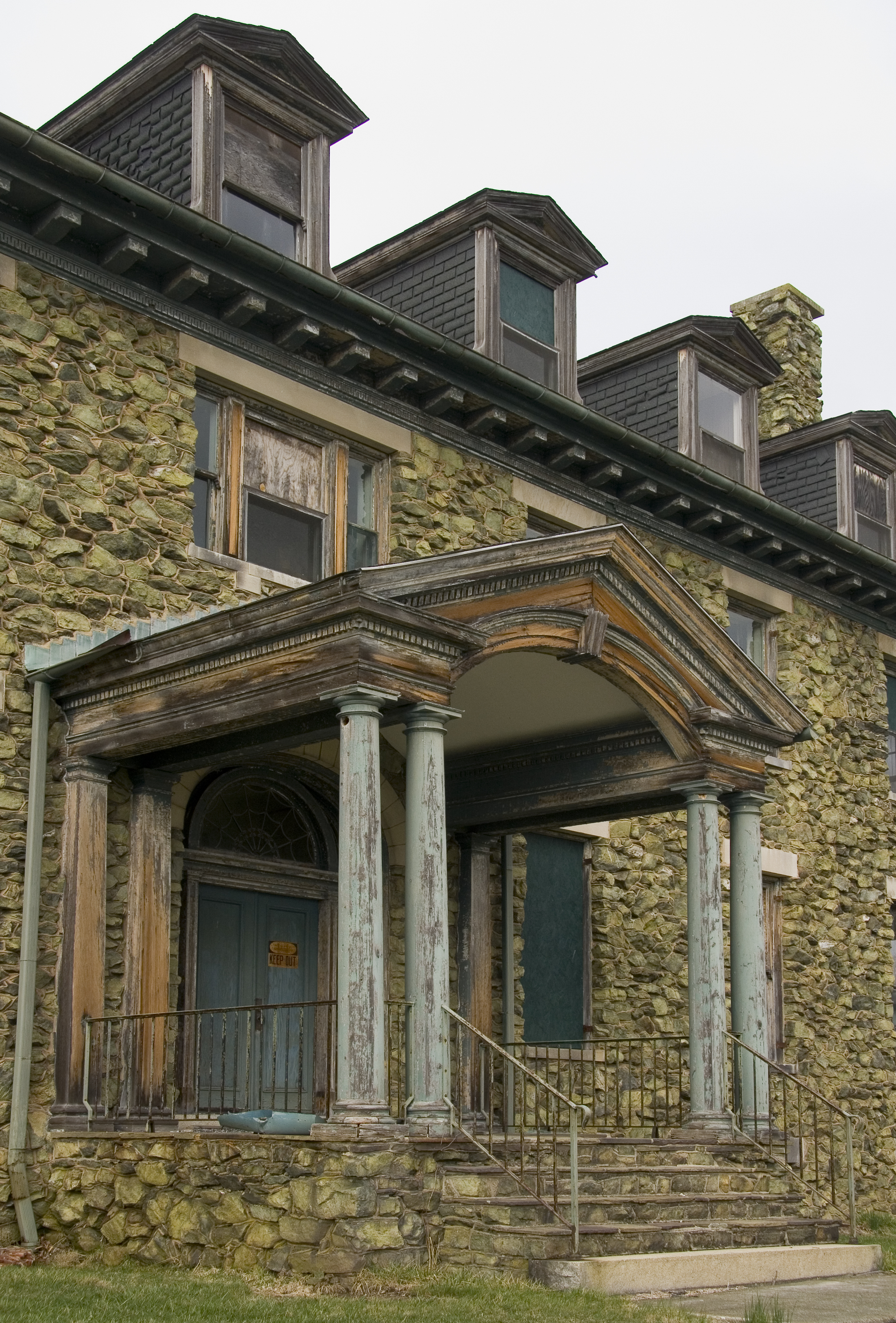

- Location within Maryland Location within the United States
- Location: Victor Cullen Center Campus, Sabillasville, Maryland
- Coordinates: 39°42′40″N 77°27′26″W
- Area: less than one acre
- Built: 1907
- Architect: Wyatt & Nolting
- Architectural style: Colonial Revival
- NRHP reference No.: 90001228
- Added to NRHP: August 22, 1990

The Victor Cullen Center, Old Administration Building is a historic building located at Sabillasville, Frederick County, Maryland, United States. It is a 2 1/2-story, stone and frame Colonial Revival style structure located on a hillside with four stone chimneys, two on each gable end. The building was built originally to house the Maryland Tuberculosis Sanitorium, the first state sponsored institution of its type in Maryland. It was designed by the architectural firm Wyatt & Nolting.

The Old Administration Building of the Victor Cullen Center was listed on the National Register of Historic Places in 1990.

== See also ==
- Victor Cullen School Power House, also NRHP-listed
