= Matthew Cullen (miner) =

American miner and hotelier

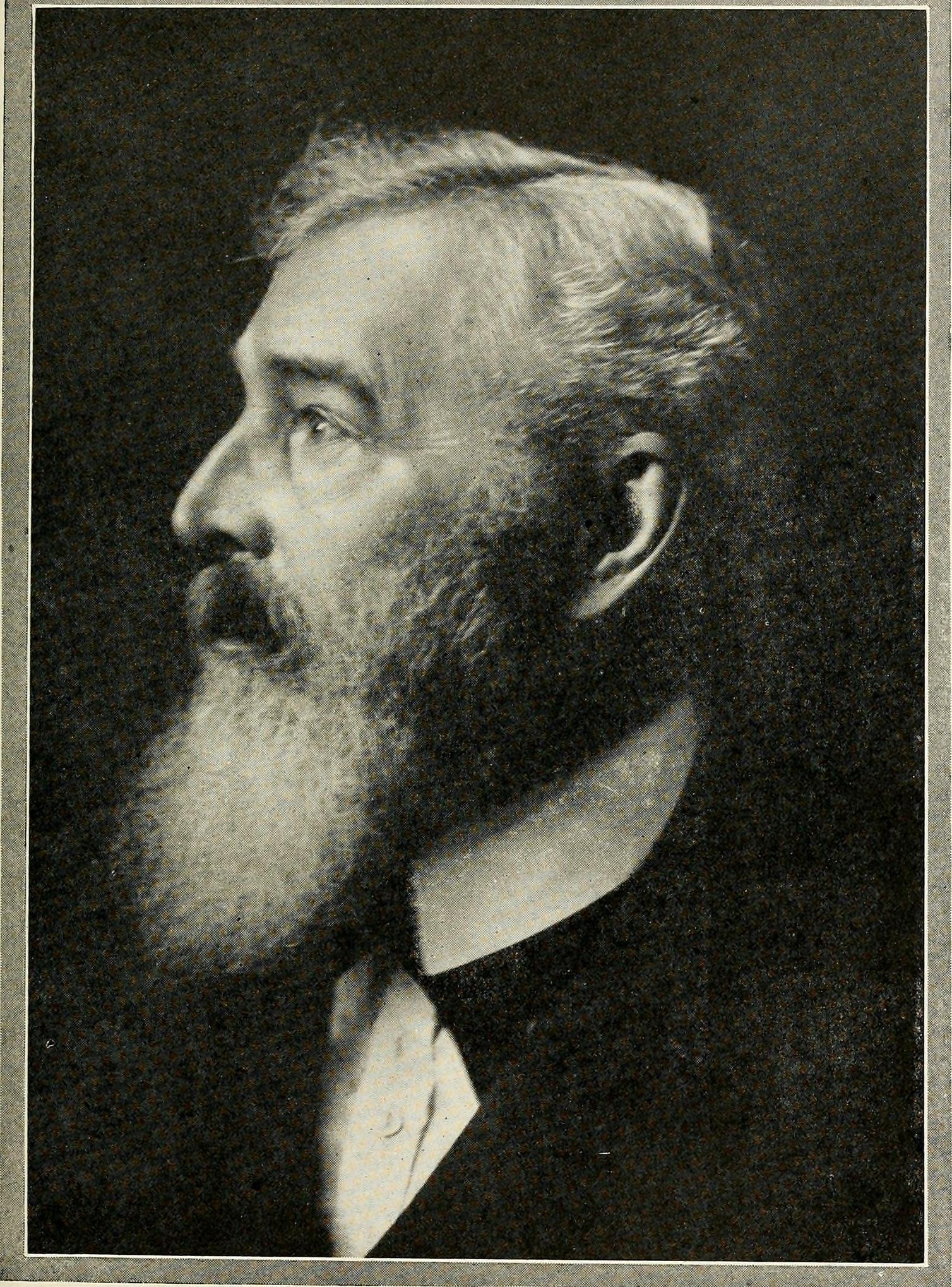
- Born: July 17, 1840; Ireland
- Died: February 27, 1918 (aged 77); Salt Lake City, Utah
- Known for: Mining entrepreneur in Utah

Matthew Cullen (1840–1918) was an American miner who struck it rich in silver mining in the U.S. west. He later built and operated the Cullen Hotel in Salt Lake City, Utah, and lived 35 years at the Keyser–Cullen House.

== Early life ==
He was born July 17, 1840, in Ireland and immigrated to the U.S. in 1852.

== Career ==
Born in Ireland on July 17, 1840, to Patrick and Catherine Rice Cullen, Matthew emigrated with his family to the United States in 1852, settling in Maryland. After apprenticing as a blacksmith at the age of fourteen, Matthew worked in the trade for three years before heading west, driving a team across the plains to Fort Bridger, Wyoming. He spent the next few years herding cattle and freighting between Fort Bridger and Fort Laramie. He was then placed in charge of government stock at what is now Stockton, where he remained until May 1860. Matthew then returned to Maryland after a stop at New Mexico with the United States Army. With the outbreak of the Civil War, Cullen embarked on an active and short-lived military career. He was stationed in several areas, and served in the First Division, Twentieth Corps, which accompanied General Sherman on his march through Atlanta. After the war, he returned to Maryland for a short visit with his mother and sister before traveling to Chicago to secure the release of his brother, who had been a Confederate soldier, from the Camp Douglas military prison. From this point, Cullen continued west, ending up in Denver, Colorado, in the autumn of 1865. He became involved with mining for a couple of years, and then in 1867 became a railroad contractor, assisting in the construction of the Union Pacific line through Utah and Wyoming. He subsequently moved to Echo, Utah, where he made freighting trips between there and Salt Lake City. He also shuttled passengers to the mines and the railroads. His career path then took another turn when he became a prospector. Along with James C. O'Neil he discovered the rich Star District mines in Beaver County, Utah, and also became a part owner of the Horn Silver Mine near Frisco, in Beaver County in 1876. With an investment of $25,000, Cullen and his three partners, A.G. Campbell, Dennis Ryan, and A. Byram would become owners of one of the richest silver mines in the world at the time. The partnership sold the mine three years later for $5 million. Cullen also became highly involved in real estate and his business activities contributed much to the development of the state. Along with his involvement with mines (which was not limited to Utah alone), he also owned the Cullen Hotel (demolished) in Salt Lake City, and the Gault House in Chicago, Illinois. He later purchased an interest in the Salt Lake Brewing Company, where he served as president (later, this would become the Cullen Ice and Beverage Company). It was most likely through this association with the Salt Lake Brewery that Cullen met Aaron Keyser, although no documentation mentions anything about their acquaintanceship. It seems to have been common practice for brewery owners in Salt Lake City to live near their breweries. Albert Fisher, a major brewer in the city lived near his brewery; Keyser lived here until his death.

== Death ==
He died February 27, 1918.
