= Cullen Hotel =

Hotel in Salt Lake City, Utah, US

Coordinates: 40.7650°N 111.8919°W

The Cullen Hotel, in Salt Lake City, Utah, was a five-story hotel opened in 1887. Construction began in August 1886, and the hotel was opened on October 3rd, 1887. Also known as The Cullen, it was owned by Matthew Cullen.

Frederick U. Leonard, who married a daughter of Cullen, rose to presidency of some of Cullen's enterprises and was a director of the hotel.

It was designed by architect Richard K. A. Kletting.
