= Wyatt & Nolting =

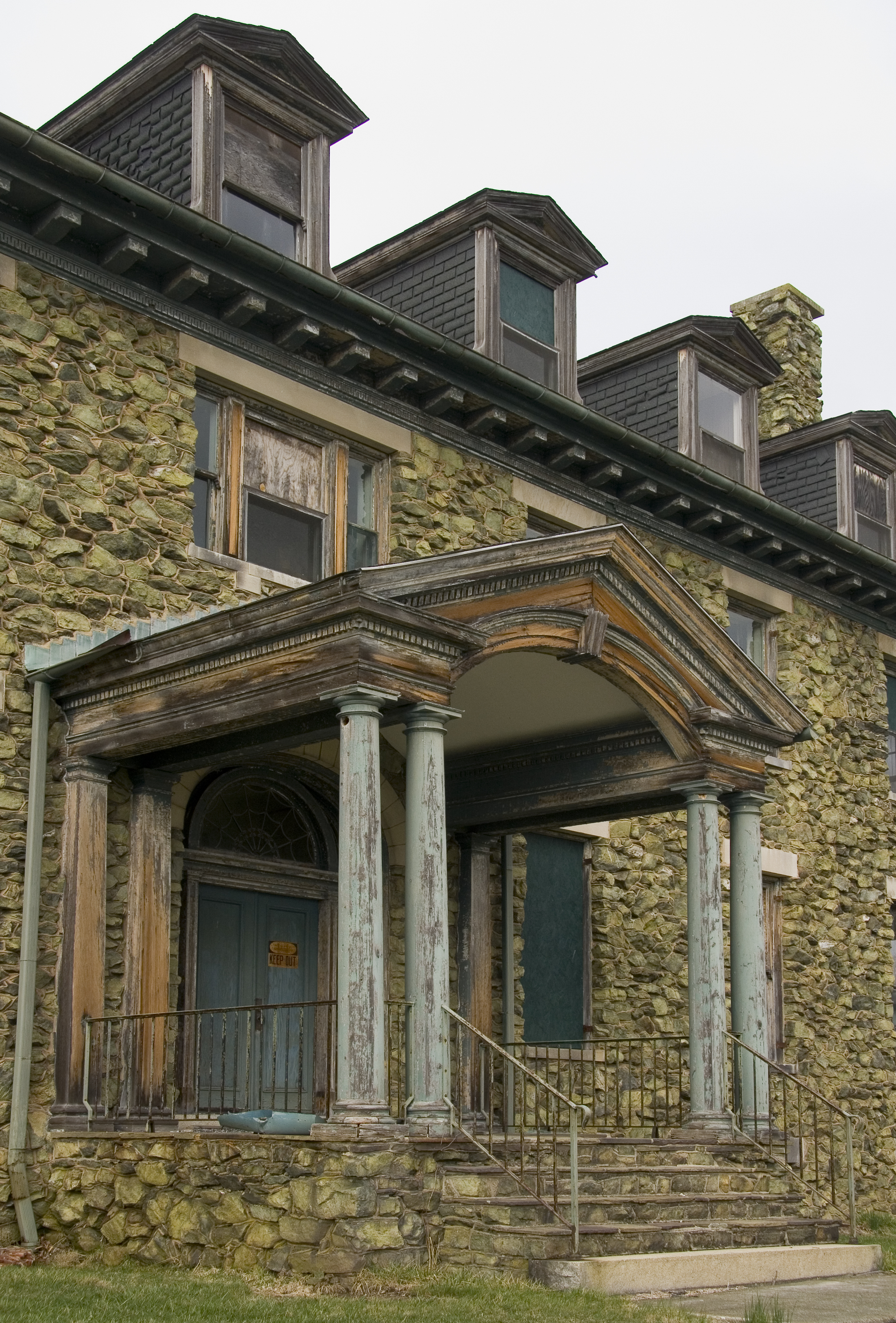
Victor Cullen Center, Old Administration Building

Wyatt & Nolting was an architectural partnership of James Bosley Noel Wyatt (1847–1926) and William G. Nolting (1866–1940), which completed numerous works listed on the U.S. National Register of Historic Places:

- Emmanuel Episcopal Church, Bel Air, 301 North Main Street, Bel Air, Maryland, 1896
- Clarence M. Mitchell Jr. Courthouse, Baltimore, Maryland, 1896-1900
- Liriodendron (Bel Air, Maryland), 501 and 502 West Gordon Street, Bel Air, Maryland, 1898
- Old Norfolk City Hall, 235 E. Plume Street, Norfolk, Virginia, 1898-1900
- Fifth Regiment Armory, 210—247 West Hoffman Street, Baltimore, Maryland, 1901
- Pikesville Armory, 610 Reisterstown Road, Pikesville, Maryland, 1903
- Victor Cullen Center, Old Administration Building, Victor Cullen Center Campus, Sabillasville, Maryland, 1907
- Victor Cullen School Power House, MD 81, Sabillasville, Maryland, 1908
- Virginia Bank and Trust Building, 101 Granby Street, Norfolk, Virginia, 1908-09
- The Garrett Building, 233-239 Redwood Street, Baltimore, Maryland, 1913
- Physics Building, later Kreiger Hall, Homewood Campus of Johns Hopkins University, Baltimore, Maryland, 1928-1933
- One or more works in Clifton Park, bounded by Hartford Road, Erdman Avenue, Clifton Park Terrace, the Baltimore Belt Railroad and Sinclair Lane, Baltimore, Maryland, (Niersee & Neilson; Wyatt and Nolting)
