= Maryland Food Bank =

American nonprofit organization

- Abbreviation: MFB
- Formation: 1979
- Founder: Ann Miller
- Type: Non-profit
- Tax ID no.: 52-1135690
- Purpose: Hunger relief for people in Maryland
- Headquarters: 2200 Halethorpe Farms Road, Baltimore, MD 21227, US
- Location: Maryland, United States
- Region served: Baltimore City and 21 Maryland counties (all except Prince George's and Montgomery counties)
- Services: Food collection and distribution, nutrition education, culinary job training, SNAP outreach, advocacy, volunteer opportunities
- President and CEO: Meg Kimmel
- Key people: Mike Blair (Board Chair)
- Affiliations: Feeding America
- Website: mdfoodbank.org

The Maryland Food Bank (MFB) is a non-profit organization dedicated to alleviating hunger in Maryland. It was founded in 1979 as the first food bank on the East Coast. The organization collects and distributes food through a statewide network of community partners and operates programs aimed at addressing the root causes of hunger.

== History ==
The Maryland Food Bank was founded in 1979 by Ann Miller. In its inaugural year, MFB distributed 400,000 pounds of food to 38 assistance sites in Baltimore City. In 1981, the organization expanded its operations by opening a branch in Salisbury to serve the Eastern Shore better.

The food bank celebrated its 45th anniversary in 2024. Over the decades, its services grew significantly; in 2019, the amount of food distributed in its first year (400,000 pounds) was distributed in less than a week.

In 2004, the Maryland Food Bank moved its headquarters from Baltimore City to a larger facility in Halethorpe, Baltimore County, to accommodate its expanding operations.

== Mission ==
The Maryland Food Bank's mission is "Feeding people, strengthening communities, and ending hunger for more Marylanders." Beyond immediate food assistance, MFB works to address the root causes of food insecurity through various programs and advocacy efforts, aiming to create a more equitable, resilient, and accessible food system.

== Coverage area ==
The Maryland Food Bank serves Baltimore City and 21 of Maryland's 23 counties. Prince George's and Montgomery Counties are served by the Capital Area Food Bank. MFB operates three primary warehouse and distribution facilities:

- Baltimore Office (Headquarters): 2200 Halethorpe Farms Road, Baltimore, MD 21227
- Eastern Shore Branch: 28500 Owens Branch Road, Salisbury, MD 21801 (opened 1981)
- Western Branch: 220 McRand Court, Hagerstown, MD 21740

MFB distributes food through a network of about 780 community-based organizations, including soup kitchens, food pantries, shelters, and schools.

== Programs ==
The Maryland Food Bank operates a variety of programs to address the needs of food-insecure individuals and families across the state:

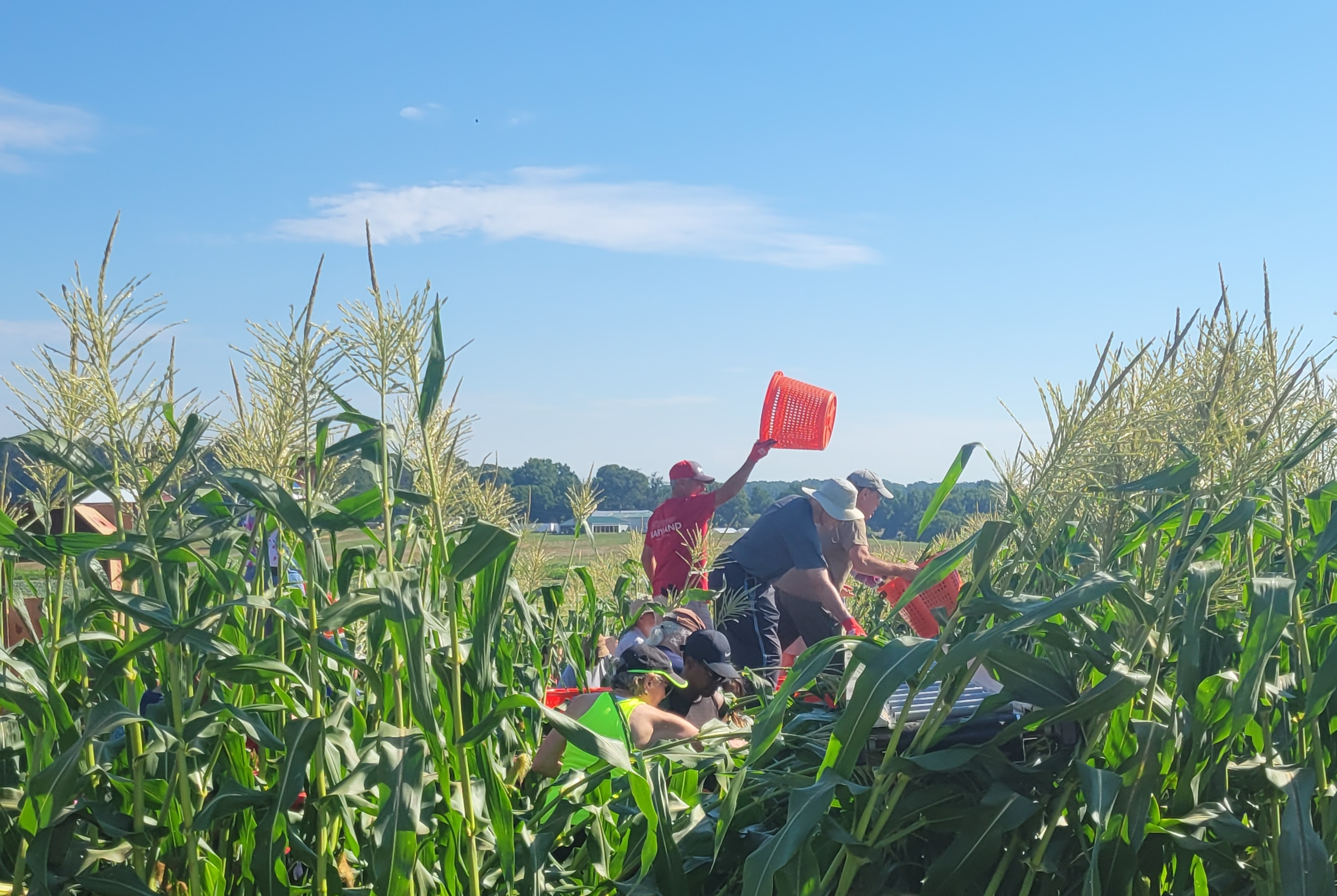
- Volunteers at First Fruits Farm for Maryland Food Bank. (August 20, 2022.)
  Farm to Food Bank: This program partners with local Maryland farms (over 50 as of 2019) to procure fresh, local produce for distribution, increasing access to nutritious food options. In Fiscal Year 2024, this program helped distribute over 14 million pounds of produce.
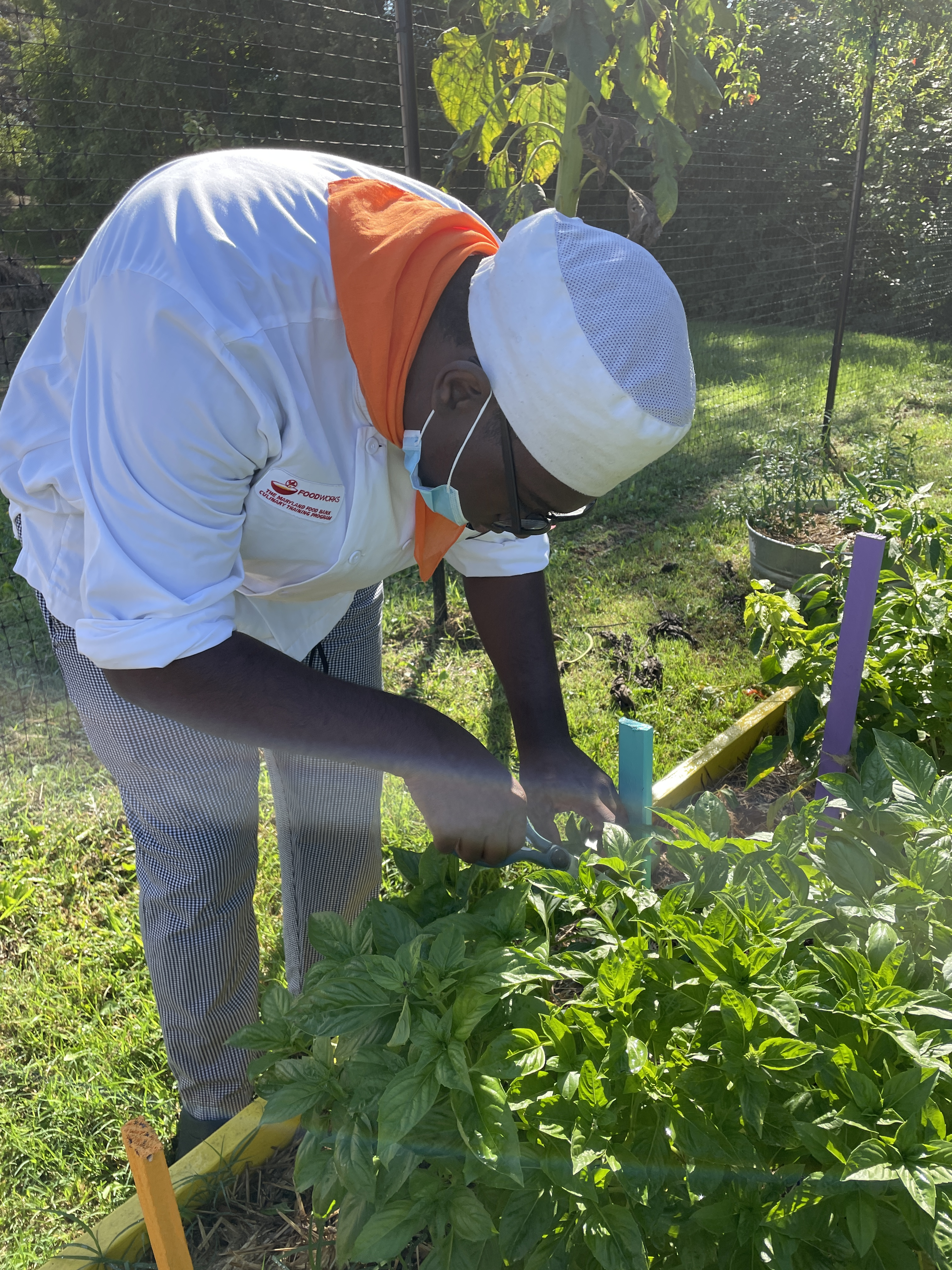
- A FoodWorks trainee snips fresh basil for use in a prepared dish.
  FoodWorks: A free 12-week culinary training program.
- Mobile Markets: Refrigerated vans that bring fresh produce and other healthy food options directly to communities, that lack other food assistance options.
- Pantry on the Go: A program that brings large quantities of food directly to communities where access to traditional food pantries is limited. In FY24, Pantry on the Go distributed 10.5 million meals through 2,075 events.
- School Pantry Program: A program of school-based pantries that provide food to children and their families. In FY24, MFB supported 185 school pantries.
- SNAP Outreach: MFB assists eligible Marylanders in applying for the Supplemental Nutrition Assistance Program (SNAP), formerly known as food stamps.
- Summer Clubs and Supper Clubs: These programs provide meals to children who may rely on free or reduced-price school meals during the academic year to ensure they have access to food during out-of-school times.
- Workforce Development: MFB offers or connects individuals to training opportunities that lead to sustainable employment.

== Impact and statistics ==
The Maryland Food Bank plays a significant role in addressing food insecurity across the state.

- In Fiscal Year 2024, MFB distributed over 52 million pounds of food, which was enough to provide more than 43.5 million meals.
- The organization served an estimated 1,021,729 unique individuals in FY24.
- Of the food distributed in FY24, over 14.3 million pounds was fresh produce.
- The organization works with a network of about 780 community partners.

== Community Tools and Resources ==
=== Find Food Search Tool ===
The Maryland Food Bank's Find Food tool is an interactive map designed to connect individuals and families in need with nearby food assistance programs. Users can locate food pantries, soup kitchens, meal programs for children, and other partner organizations. This resource aims to simplify the process for individuals seeking immediate food assistance in their communities.

=== Maryland Hunger Map ===
The Maryland Hunger Map is a data visualization tool that offers a comprehensive view of food insecurity across the state. This interactive map utilizes various data layers, including food insecurity rates, poverty levels, unemployment rates, and ALICE (Asset Limited, Income Constrained, Employed) data, to illustrate the prevalence and characteristics of hunger at different geographic levels. The map also displays the reach of the Maryland Food Bank's distribution network and the locations of partner organizations.

=== Research ===
The Maryland Food Bank publishes research reports and data briefs to further inform the public and stakeholders about the state of food insecurity in Maryland. They cover specific aspects of hunger, analyze trends, and highlight the impact of the food bank's programs and broader economic factors.

== Volunteer Program ==
Volunteers contribute time and skills across various programs and locations.

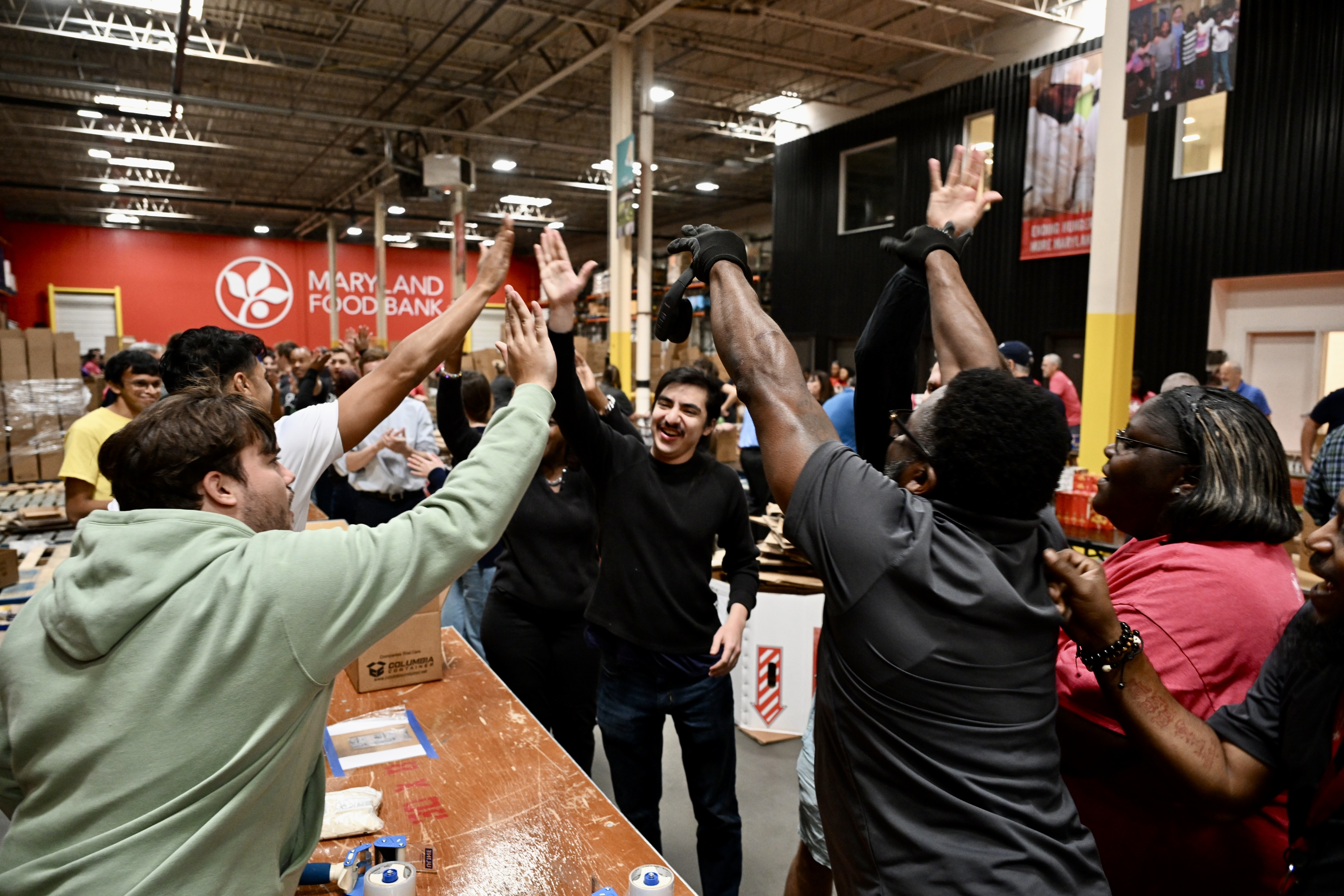
MFB Pack to Give Back volunteers celebrate after completing a shift in 2024.

Key volunteer activities include:

- Warehouse Operations (Baltimore, Salisbury): Sorting donated food, checking expiration dates, packing boxes with non-perishables, and creating meal kits.
- Kitchen Assistance (Charles T. Bauer Community Kitchen, Baltimore): Preparing ingredients and packaging meals for distribution.
- Farm to Food Bank Program (Partner Farms Statewide): Assisting with harvesting fresh fruits and vegetables at various partner farms.
- Garden Support (Education/Demonstration Garden, Baltimore): Watering and tending to plants in the facility's 5,000sq ft. outdoor living classroom.
- Office Support: Assisting with administrative tasks such as filing, data entry, and special projects.

Prospective volunteers can find more information, specific requirements, and sign-up details on the Maryland Food Bank's website.

== FoodWorks Culinary Training Program ==
FoodWorks is the Maryland Food Bank's flagship workforce development program, focused on culinary arts.

=== History ===
The FoodWorks program was launched in 2010 at the Maryland Food Bank's headquarters in Halethorpe, Baltimore County, operating out of the newly constructed Charles T. Bauer Community Kitchen. The program aimed to address unemployment, a root cause of hunger, by providing job skills and pathways to careers in the culinary field.

In March 2022, MFB expanded the program by launching a second FoodWorks site on the Eastern Shore in Salisbury in partnership with Wor-Wic Community College.

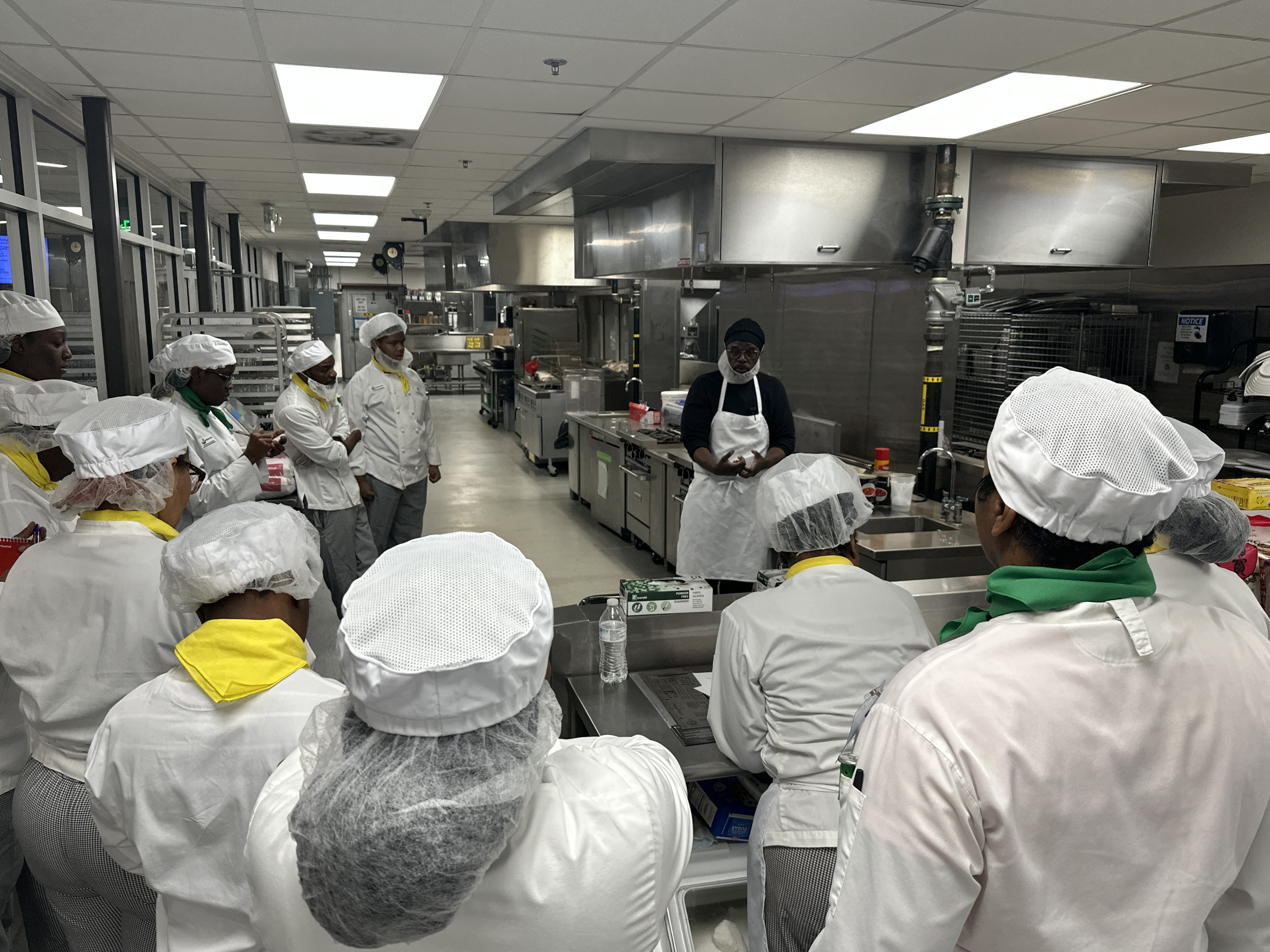
FoodWorks Class 44 students learn cooking techniques from a chef trainer.

By the end of Fiscal Year 2024, over 550 individuals had graduated from the FoodWorks program since its inception.

=== Program Details ===
FoodWorks is a 12-week, intensive training program offered free of charge to eligible individuals aged 18 and older who are residents of MFB's service area.

The curriculum includes:

- Fundamental culinary techniques and knife skills
- Nutrition and menu planning
- Food safety and handling (leading to ServSafe® Food Handler and Manager certifications)
- Professionalism, workplace discipline, and interpersonal "life skills"
- Job-seeking skills, including resume-building and interview preparation

Training takes place in professional kitchens at the MFB headquarters (Charles T. Bauer Community Kitchen).

In FY24, 67 students graduated from the program.

== Education Garden and Workshops ==
The Maryland Food Bank maintains a 5,000-square-foot Education/Demonstration Garden at its Baltimore headquarters in Halethorpe. This garden serves as an outdoor living classroom and is a component of MFB's broader nutrition education initiatives.

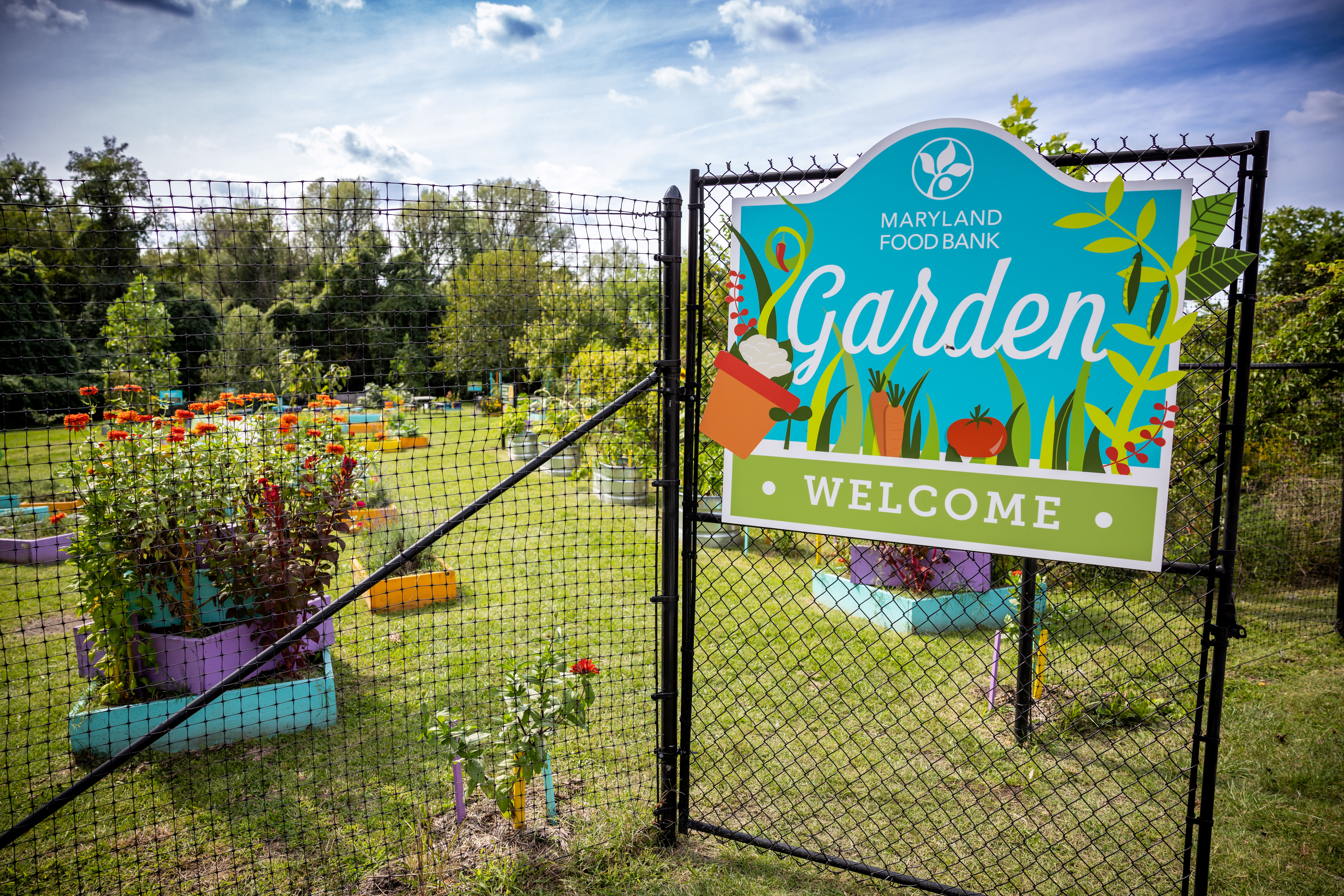
Maryland Food Bank's Nutrition Garden

The garden offers educational opportunities for various groups, including schoolchildren, MFB's network partners, and FoodWorks students. Participants can learn about basic farming and gardening techniques and sustainability practices in food production.

Volunteer opportunities are available to help maintain the Education Garden. The hands-on experience aims to deepen understanding of fresh food and healthy eating.

== Affiliations ==
The Maryland Food Bank is a member of Feeding America, the national network of food banks.

== See also ==
- List of food banks
- Feeding America
- Capital Area Food Bank (serves Montgomery and Prince George's counties in Maryland)
