= Victor Cullen School Power House =

- U.S. National Register of Historic Places
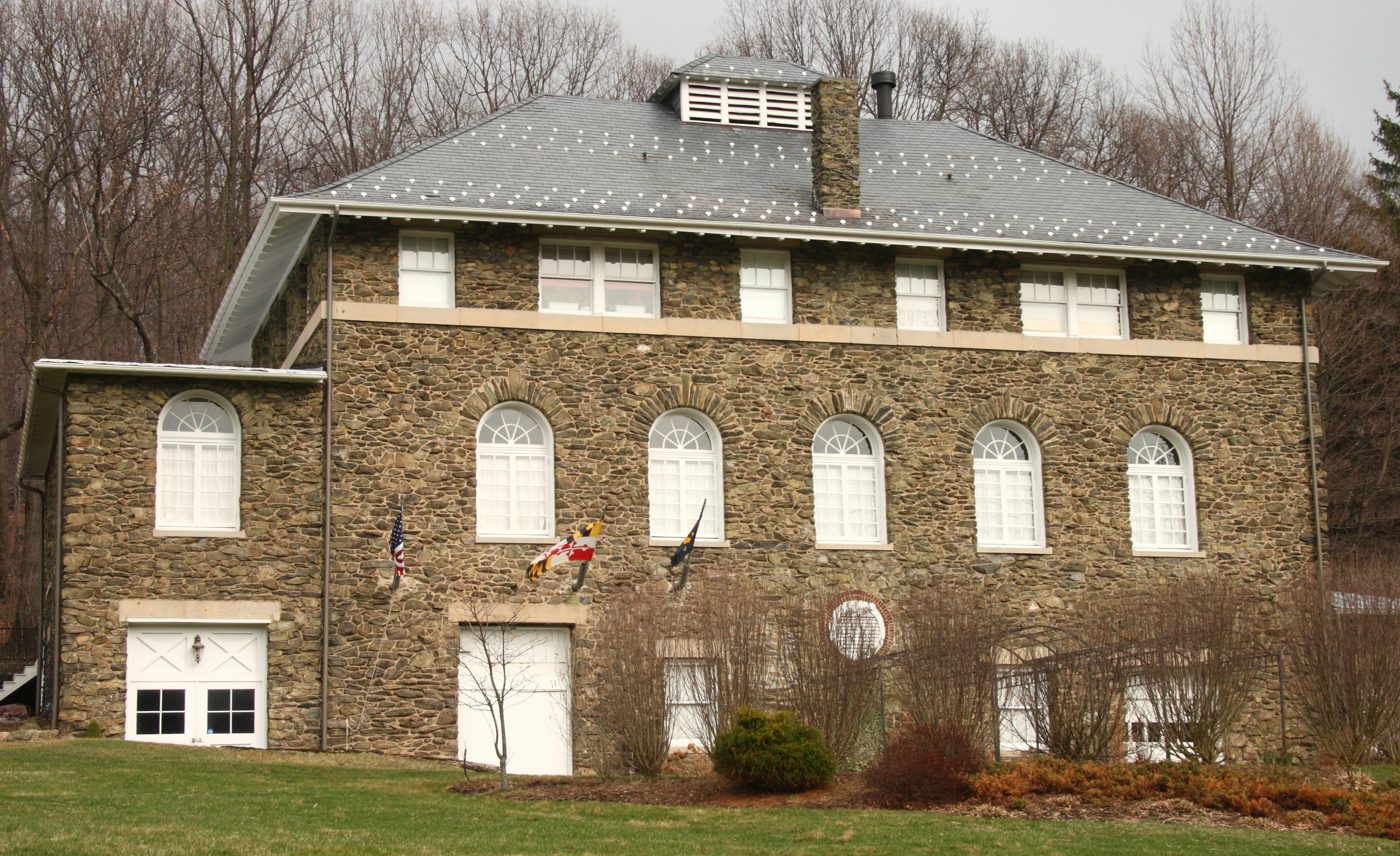

- Location within Maryland Location within the United States
- Location: MD 81, Sabillasville, Maryland
- Coordinates: 39°42′52″N 77°27′43″W
- Area: 2 acres (0.81 ha)
- Built: 1908
- Architect: Wyatt & Nolting; Smith, Henry, Sons & Co.
- Architectural style: Romanesque
- NRHP reference No.: 87000045
- Added to NRHP: January 7, 1987

The Victor Cullen School Power House is a historic power house building located at Sabillasville, Frederick County, Maryland. It is a 2 1/2-story, Renaissance Revival stone erection, with a hip roof and a fully exposed basement. The building was built originally as part of the Maryland Tuberculosis Sanitorium, the first state sponsored institution of its type in Maryland. It was designed by architects Wyatt & Nolting.

The Victor Cullen School Power House was listed on the National Register of Historic Places in 1987.

== See also ==
- Victor Cullen Center, Old Administration Building, also NRHP-listed
