= James Bosley Noel Wyatt =

American architect

James Bosley Noel Wyatt (1847–1926) was an American architect and co-founder of the Wyatt & Nolting architectural partnership.

== Education ==
Wyatt attended Harvard University, Massachusetts Institute of Technology, and the Ecole des Beaux Arts.

== Career ==
Wyatt's career began in the offices of E.F. Baldwin where he began his affiliation with Joseph Evans Sperry. Their partnership lasted from 1878 to 1887. He later established the Wyatt & Nolting architectural partnership with William G. Nolting from 1889 until his own death in 1926. The Wyatt & Nolting partnership completed numerous works that are listed on the U.S. National Register of Historic Places.

Wyatt was chapter president of the American Institute of Architects, Baltimore chapter from 1902 until 1911. He served as a correspondent for American Architect & Building News, and was a college lecturer. Among his prominent works in Baltimore, where he chiefly practiced, were: St. Michael and All Angels Church, Belvedere Terrace, and the Mercantile Safe Deposit and Trust Company Building.
