= Maryland Route 806 =

State highway in Maryland, United States

Maryland Route 806
- Maryland Route 806 highlighted in red

Route information
- Maintained by MDSHA
- Existed: 1960–present
- Tourist routes: Journey Through Hallowed Ground Byway

MD 806A
- Length: 3.04 mi (4.89 km)
- South end: US 15 near Catoctin Furnace
- North end: Frederick Road in Thurmont

MD 806R
- Length: 0.55 mi (890 m)
- South end: MD 550 in Thurmont
- North end: Emmitsburg Road in Thurmont

Location
- Country: United States
- State: Maryland
- Counties: Frederick

Highway system
- Maryland highway system; Interstate; US; State; Scenic Byways
← MD 805	→ MD 807

Maryland Route 806 (MD 806) is a state highway in the U.S. state of Maryland. The state highway runs a total of 4.05 miles (6.52 km) in two segments from U.S. Route 15 (US 15) near Catoctin Furnace north to Roddy Creek Road near Thurmont. MD 806A, which has a length of 3.04 miles (4.89 km) from Catoctin Furnace to Thurmont, and MD 806R, which extends 0.55 miles (0.89 km) on the north side of Thurmont, are separated by a section of municipally-maintained road on the south side of Thurmont and a segment of MD 550 north of MD 77. MD 806 is the old alignment of US 15 through Catoctin Furnace and Thurmont. The state highway was originally constructed in the 1910s. MD 806 was assigned to the highway when US 15 bypassed Thurmont in the late 1950s. The state highway became a split route in the late 1980s. There have been several other segments of MD 806 along former sections of US 15 in Frederick County, including portions around Lewistown and south of Frederick.

== Route description ==
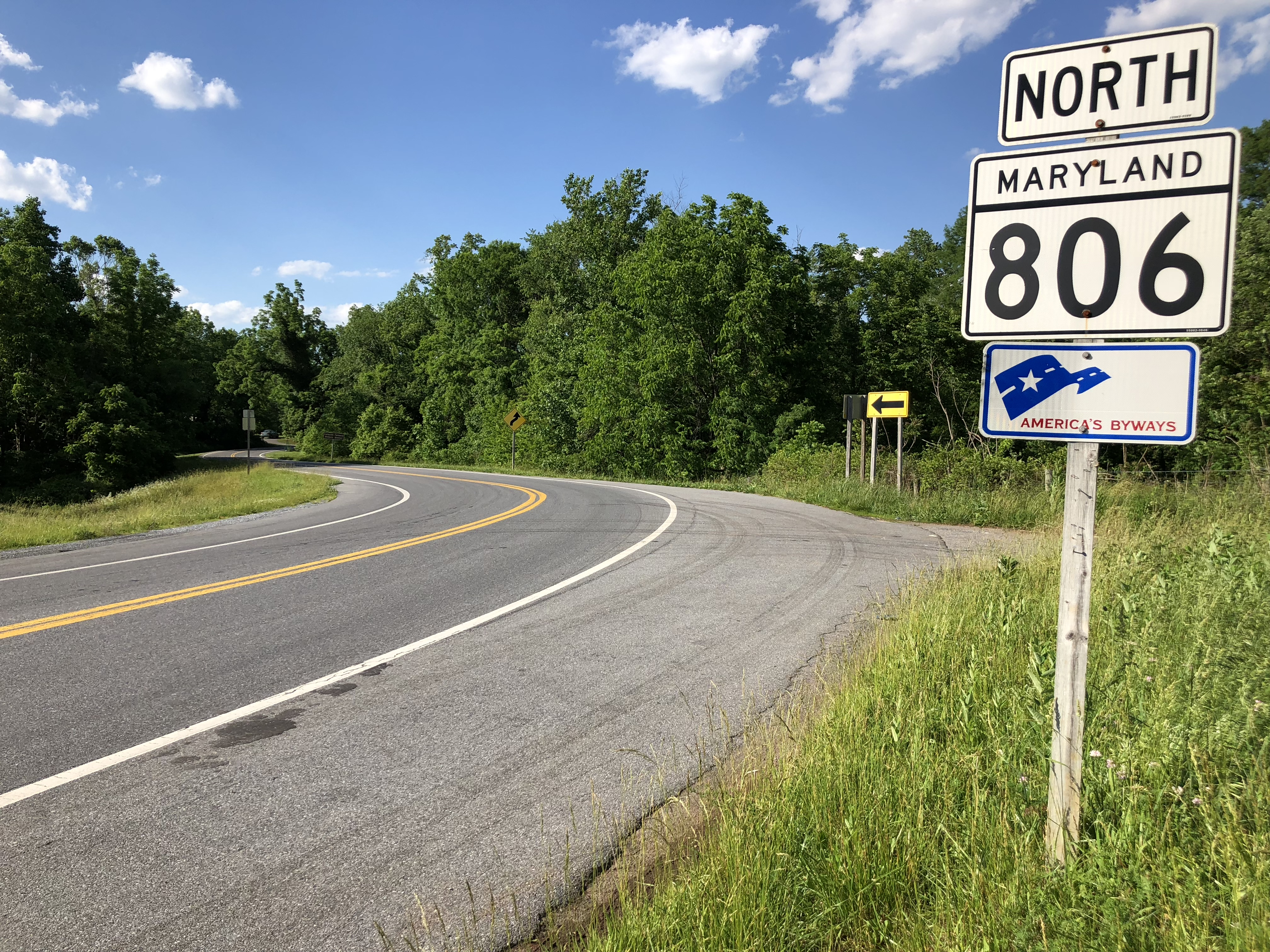
View north along MD 806 at US 15 in Catoctin Furnace

MD 806 begins at an intersection with US 15 (Catoctin Mountain Highway) and Auburn Road, the old alignment of US 15 that heads south closely paralleling the southbound lanes of US 15. The state highway, officially MD 806A, heads north as two-lane undivided Catoctin Furnace Road through the community of Catoctin Furnace. MD 806 parallels the northbound lanes of US 15, which itself parallels the eastern edge of Catoctin Mountain and the eastern boundary of Cunningham Falls State Park. The state highway crosses Little Hunting Creek and passes the site of the Catoctin Furnace and the Catoctin Wildlife Preserve and Zoo. Just south of the zoo, MD 806 has access to US 15 and the Manor Area of Cunningham Falls State Park via a two-way spur to US 15, which closely parallels MD 806 at that point. The state highway veers away from US 15 and intersects Blue Mountain Road, which heads west as unsigned US 15G to provide another access point to the parallel divided highway. MD 806 traverses High Run then reaches its northern terminus at the southern town limit of Thurmont.

The roadway, which was formerly part of MD 806, continues north as municipally-maintained Frederick Road through a commercial area. Frederick Road intersects Thurmont Boulevard, which heads west to a diamond interchange with US 15. The old highway crosses Hunting Creek and turns north onto Water Street to pass through downtown Thurmont. At MD 77 (Main Street), the old alignment becomes a state highway again as part of MD 550, which heads east with MD 77 along Main Street and north along Church Street, which passes under the Maryland Midland Railway. The Church Street portion of MD 550 is also signed as MD 806. The next official segment of MD 806 (officially MD 806R) begins at MD 550 and follows Emmitsburg Road northeast to the northern border of Thurmont. At this point, MD 806R ends and Emmitsburg Road continues north as a county road.

== History ==
The two sections of MD 806 through Catoctin Furnace and Thurmont and the intervening town streets are the old alignment of US 15. Originally part of the Frederick and Emmitsburg Turnpike, the highway was one of the original state roads marked for improvement by the Maryland State Roads Commission in 1909. The commission purchased the turnpike in 1911 and resurfaced the turnpike south of Thurmont with a 14-foot (4.3 m) wide macadam surface in 1915. The same type of surface was applied along the turnpike right-of-way from Thurmont to Emmitsburg between 1915 and 1919. The highways through Catoctin Furnace and Thurmont were designated US 15 in 1927 and widened to 20 feet (6.1 m) around 1930.

Construction on the Thurmont Bypass from Catoctin Furnace to Owens Creek began in 1956. The new highway, which was constructed as the first roadway of an ultimate divided highway, was completed in 1958. US 15 moved to its present alignment and the old road was designated as the first section of MD 806. The northern terminus of the Thurmont section of MD 806 was originally just north of the right angle turn from Emmitsburg Road to Albert Staub Road, where MD 806 met then two-lane US 15 at an oblique intersection. When US 15 was reconstructed as a divided highway from MD 550 north toward Emmitsburg in 1983, MD 806's original terminus was removed. MD 806 was moved onto Albert Staub Road, which was extended north over a new bridge over Owens Creek to an intersection with Roddy Creek Road. MD 806 was split into MD 806A and MD 806R when the highway from the southern town limit of Thurmont to MD 77 was transferred to municipal maintenance around 1989.

Several other sections of the old alignment of US 15 have been marked as sections of MD 806. US 15 bypassed Lewistown in 1962. The old alignment along Hessong Bridge Road and Angleberger Road was a segment of MD 806 until it was transferred to county maintenance around 1985. US 15 originally followed what is now MD 85 from Tuscarora to Frederick. When US 15 was moved to Washington National Pike (now Interstate 270) and the Frederick Freeway after the latter freeway was completed in 1959, the portion of US 15 between Washington National Pike and MD 355 became a segment of MD 806. The segment of MD 806 south of Frederick became part of MD 85 in 1971. Other portions of the old alignment of US 15 that were part of MD 806 include Hansonville Road between Frederick and Lewistown; Auburn Road between Lewistown and Catoctin Furnace; and Franklinville Road, St. Anthony Road, and Old Emmitsburg Road between Thurmont and Emmitsburg. On October 31, 2016, the portion of MD 806R between the northern border of Thurmont and Roddy Creek Road was transferred to county maintenance.

== Junction list ==
The entire route is in Frederick County.

Location	mi	km	Destinations	Notes
Catoctin Furnace	0.00	0.00	US 15 (Catoctin Mountain Highway) / Auburn Road south – Frederick, Gettysburg	Southern terminus of MD 806A
Catoctin Furnace	1.29	2.08	To US 15	Two-way spur to US 15
Catoctin Furnace	2.31	3.72	Blue Mountain Road to US 15	Blue Mountain Road west is unsigned US 15G
Thurmont	3.04	4.89	Frederick Road north	Northern terminus of MD 806A; Thurmont town limit
Thurmont	Highway continues as municipally-maintained Frederick Road and Water Street toward MD 77 and MD 550			
Thurmont	0.00	0.00	MD 550 (Church Street) to MD 77 – Sabillasville	Southern terminus of MD 806R
Thurmont	0.55	0.89	Emmitsburg Road north	Northern terminus of MD 806R
1.000 mi = 1.609 km; 1.000 km = 0.621 mi

== Auxiliary routes ==
MD 806 has three existing and two former unsigned auxiliary routes.

- MD 806I is the designation for the unnamed 0.53-mile (0.85 km) service road that runs north along the southbound side of US 15 from an intersection with US 15 past Willow Road to a dead end north of Frederick.
- MD 806N is the designation for the unnamed 0.09-mile (0.14 km) service road that runs north along the southbound side of US 15 from Hayward Road north to an intersection with US 15. The route originally ran to a cul-de-sac until it was realigned to end at US 15 in 2010.
- MD 806O was the designation for the unnamed 0.04-mile (0.064 km) service road that ran north along the southbound side of US 15 from Lohr Road to a dead end between Thurmont and Emmitsburg. The route was transferred to county maintenance on October 31, 2016.
- MD 806S was the designation for Roddy Court, which ran 0.14 miles (0.23 km) from Roddy Creek Road north to a dead end in Thurmont. MD 806S was designated in 2012. The route was transferred to county maintenance on October 31, 2016.
- MD 806T is the designation for a 0.20-mile (0.32 km) section of Monocacy Boulevard at its interchange with US 15 in Frederick. The route was created on April 20, 2015.
