= U.S. Route 15 in Maryland =

Part of the U.S. Highway System in Maryland

U.S. Route 15
- US 15 highlighted in red

Route information
- Maintained by MDSHA
- Length: 37.85 mi (60.91 km)
- Existed: 1927–present
- Tourist routes: Journey Through Hallowed Ground Byway; Chesapeake and Ohio Canal Scenic Byway; Old Main Streets Scenic Byway

Major junctions
- South end: US 15 at the Virginia state line
- MD 28 in Point of Rocks; MD 464 in Point of Rocks; US 340 near Jefferson; I-70 in Frederick; US 40 / Jefferson Street in Frederick; MD 26 in Frederick; MD 77 in Thurmont; MD 550 in Thurmont; MD 76 near Emmitsburg; MD 140 in Emmitsburg
- North end: US 15 at the Pennsylvania state line

Location
- Country: United States
- State: Maryland
- Counties: Frederick

Highway system
- United States Numbered Highway System; List; Special; Divided; Maryland highway system; Interstate; US; State; Scenic Byways
← MD 14	→ MD 16

U.S. Route 15 (US 15) is a part of the United States Numbered Highway System that runs from Walterboro, South Carolina, north to Painted Post, New York. In Maryland, the highway runs 37.85 miles (60.91 km) from the Virginia state line at the Potomac River in Point of Rocks north to the Pennsylvania state line near Emmitsburg. Known for most of its length as Catoctin Mountain Highway, US 15 is the primary north–south highway of Frederick County. The highway connects the county seat of Frederick with Point of Rocks, Leesburg, Virginia, and Charles Town, West Virginia (via US 340), to the south and with Thurmont, Emmitsburg, and Gettysburg, Pennsylvania, to the north. US 15 is an expressway throughout the state except for the portion south of MD 28. The highway is a freeway along its concurrency with US 340 and through Frederick, where the highway meets US 40 and Interstate 70 (I-70). US 15 has a business route through Emmitsburg.

US 15 is the descendant of a pair of turnpikes that connected Frederick with Emmitsburg to the north and Buckeystown to the south. These turnpikes were reconstructed as state roads in the 1910s north of Frederick and in the early 1920s from Frederick south to Tuscarora. When US 15 was assigned in 1927, the Tuscarora–Point of Rocks highway had yet to be improved; this section was paved in the early 1930s. The modern Point of Rocks Bridge was built in the late 1930s after its predecessor was destroyed in a flood. The Frederick Freeway was constructed in the 1950s. US 15 was relocated to part of the freeway; the old route of the U.S. Highway through downtown Frederick became part of Maryland Route 355 (MD 355). US 15's present highway between Point of Rocks and Jefferson was constructed in the late 1960s; the old road south of Frederick was replaced with MD 28 and MD 85. North of Frederick, the U.S. Highway bypassed Thurmont and Emmitsburg in the late 1950s and mid-1960s, respectively. US 15 was upgraded to a divided highway north of Frederick in the early 1980s.

== Route description ==
US 15 has several official designations throughout its course in Maryland. The U.S. Highway is known as Catoctin Mountain Highway from the Virginia state line at Point of Rocks north to US 340 near Jefferson and from MD 26 in Frederick north to the Pennsylvania state line near Emmitsburg. US 15 is also part of Jefferson National Pike along its freeway concurrency with US 340 and the Frederick Freeway between US 340 and MD 26. In July 2004, the Maryland General Assembly designated the highway the 115th Infantry Regiment Memorial Highway; a marker honoring the 115th Infantry Regiment was completed in the median of US 15 in Emmitsburg in July 2006. All of US 15 except the portion between Catoctin Furnace and Thurmont is part of the Journey Through Hallowed Ground Byway, which was designated a National Scenic Byway in September 2005. The entire length of the highway in Maryland is part of the National Highway System.

=== Point of Rocks to Frederick ===
US 15 enters Maryland at Point of Rocks, named for the pair of mountain peaks between which the Potomac River cuts through Catoctin Mountain in Maryland and Furnace Mountain in Loudoun County, Virginia. The highway crosses the river on the Point of Rocks Bridge, a two-lane, eight-span camelback truss bridge that also passes over the Chesapeake and Ohio Canal and CSX Transportation's Metropolitan Subdivision railroad line on the Maryland side of the river. Just north of the bridge, US 15 meets the western terminus of MD 28 (Clay Street), which serves as the main street of the community of Point of Rocks. The U.S. Highway heads north as a two-lane expressway that passes through a mix of farmland and forest on the eastern flank of Catoctin Mountain. North of its roundabout at MD 464 (Point of Rocks Road), US 15 has only two intersections, with Basford and Mountville roads, before becoming a two-lane freeway. The highway then passes Elmer Derr Road and reaches a partial interchange with US 340 (Jefferson National Pike) east of Jefferson. There is no direct access from northbound US 15 to westbound US 340 or from eastbound US 340 to southbound US 15; that access is provided by using the Mount Zion Road interchange to get turned around.

US 15 and US 340 run concurrently northeast toward Frederick as a four-lane freeway. The two highways have a diamond interchange with Mt. Zion Road and cross over Ballenger Creek. The road has a diamond interchange with Jefferson Technology Parkway (MD 872G). On the southwest side of Frederick, the freeway has a partial interchange with I-70 (Eisenhower Memorial Highway), a folded diamond interchange with MD 180 (Jefferson Pike), and a partial cloverleaf interchange with the Frederick Freeway, which carries US 40 through the interchange. US 340's eastern terminus is within the third interchange, where US 15 exits north onto the Frederick Freeway and Jefferson Street continues east toward downtown Frederick.

US 15 continues north concurrent with US 40 along the six-lane Frederick Freeway. US 40 exits the freeway at a partial cloverleaf interchange with Patrick Street, which heads east toward downtown Frederick and west through the heavily commercialized Golden Mile. US 15 crosses Carroll Creek and continues north with four lanes through folded diamond interchanges with Rosemont Avenue, 7th Street, and Motter Avenue. All three streets provide access to Fort Detrick, home of the US Army Medical Research Institute of Infectious Diseases. In addition, Rosemont Avenue leads to Hood College and Motter Avenue connects the freeway with Frederick Community College. The route comes to partial interchange with the western terminus of MD 26 (Liberty Road) before the Frederick Freeway ends at a diamond interchange with Monocacy Boulevard/Christophers Crossing.

=== Frederick to Emmitsburg ===
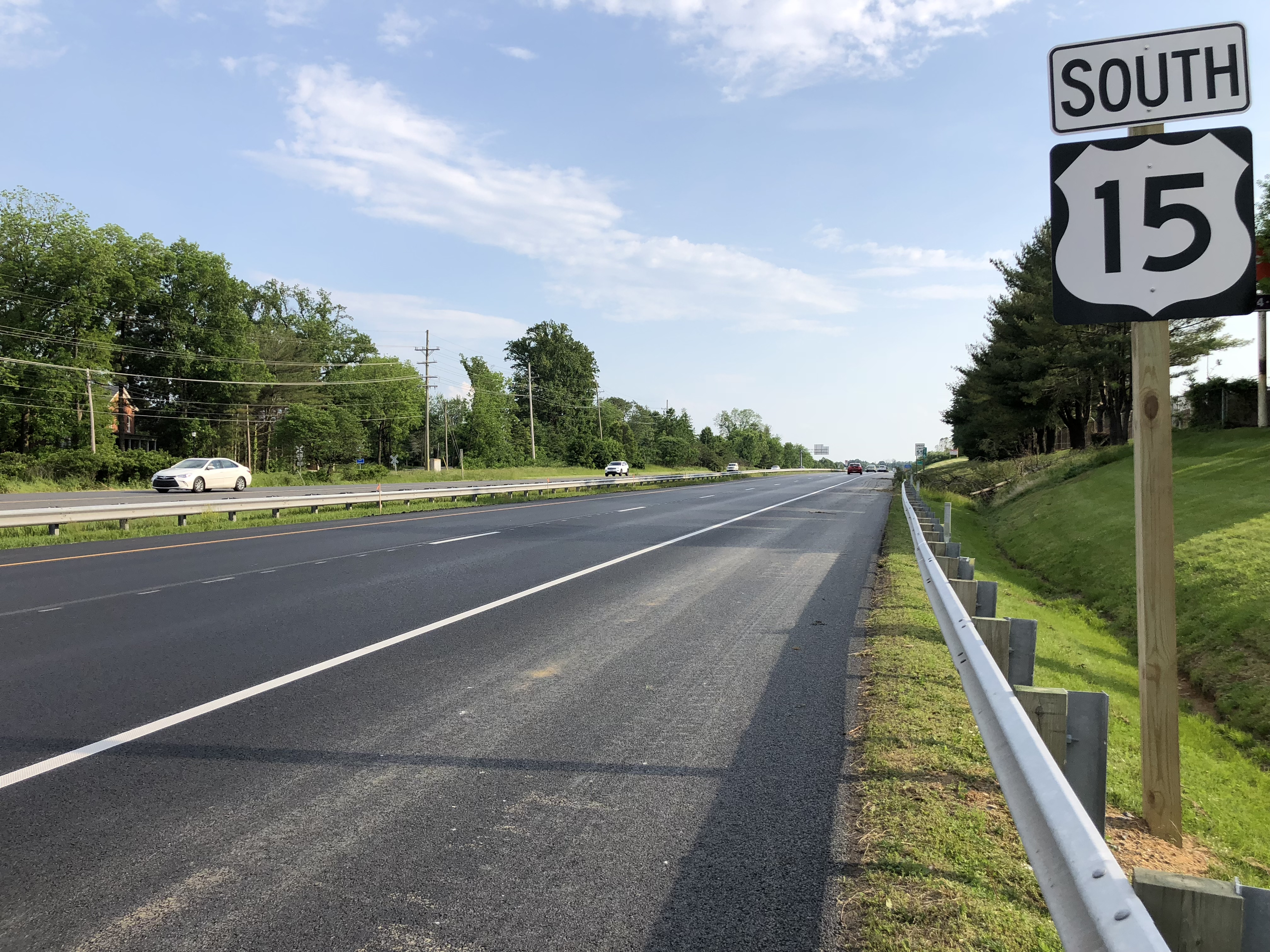
US 15 southbound past Monocacy Boulevard/Christophers Crossing in Frederick

US 15 continues north as a four-lane freeway through the Monocacy Boulevard/Christophers Crossing interchange, then becomes a four-lane expressway. Skirting the Frederick city limits, the highway crosses Tuscarora Creek and parallels the Monocacy River. It then has superstreet intersections with Willow and Biggs Ford roads. Just after passing the Frederick city limits, the highway has a superstreet intersection with Sundays Lane. Continuing north to the hamlet of Hansonville, the highway has an offset T-intersection with Old Frederick Road, followed by a superstreet intersection with Devilbiss Bridge Road/Bartgis Road. US 15 crosses Fishing Creek to the west of Lewistown and is closely paralleled on the west by Auburn Road as the highway gradually approaches the eastern flank of Catoctin Mountain. At the northern end of Auburn Road, MD 806 (Catoctin Furnace Road) begins to parallel the northbound side of the highway, which follows the eastern boundary of Cunningham Falls State Park just west of the village of Catoctin Furnace. Access to the main section of the state park is provided by Catoctin Hollow Road, which intersects the southbound lanes of US 15 and follows Little Hunting Creek up the mountain. The park's Manor Area is accessible from US 15 at an intersection a short distance north of Catoctin Hollow Road, which also provides further access to MD 806.

North of its intersection with Blue Mountain and Pryor roads, US 15 leaves the park boundary and the highway has a southbound exit ramp to Pryor Road. On the southern edge of the town of Thurmont, the highway has a diamond interchange with unnamed and unsigned MD 15C that leads to the northern end of MD 806 and to Frederick Road, which serves a commercial area south of downtown Thurmont. US 15 continues north to a partial cloverleaf interchange with MD 77 (Main Street) where the highway also crosses Hunting Creek; MD 77 follows the creek up the mountain as Foxville Road toward Catoctin Mountain Park. The southbound lanes of the highway intersect Sandy Spring Lane (unsigned MD 15D) and US 15 crosses over the Maryland Midland Railway. At the north end of Thurmont, US 15 meets MD 550 (Church Street) at a diamond interchange before crossing Owens Creek, which MD 550 follows up the mountain as Sabillasville Road. The highway heads northeast through farmland and meets Motters Station Road (also the northern end of MD 76) at a superstreet intersection before bisecting the campus of Mount St. Mary's University. On campus, the highway has a superstreet intersection with Annandale Road/College Lane; Annandale Road serves the main part of the campus and the National Shrine Grotto of Our Lady of Lourdes to the west of the highway; College Lane serves the athletic complex, which includes Knott Arena, to the east of the highway.

North of Mount St. Mary's University, US 15 meets the southern end of US 15 Business (US 15 Bus.; South Seton Avenue) at a superstreet intersection that also serves Old Frederick Road; U-turn ramps on either side of the intersection provide the missing movements. The highway crosses Toms Creek and Flat Run along the eastern side of the town of Emmitsburg before its interchange with MD 140 (Main Street); MD 140 is accessed via a pair of right-in/right-out interchanges with Emmit Gardens Drive, which is unsigned MD 904H on the northbound side of US 15 and MD 904F on the southbound side. North of MD 140, the southbound side of US 15 has a welcome center, the Mason and Dixon Discovery Center; the northbound side of the highway can access the welcome center via a U-turn ramp. US 15's last intersection in Maryland is with the northern end of US 15 Bus. (North Seton Avenue) and Welty Road, which leads to Old Gettysburg Road; there is an unusual configuration on the southbound side: the right-out from northbound US 15 Bus. to southbound US 15 is about 450 feet (140 m) south of the turn-in to US 15 Bus.; there is also no direct access from northbound US 15 Bus. to northbound US 15. North of the intersection, US 15 becomes a four-lane freeway that continues across the Pennsylvania state line as the U.S. Highway's bypass of Gettysburg.

== History ==
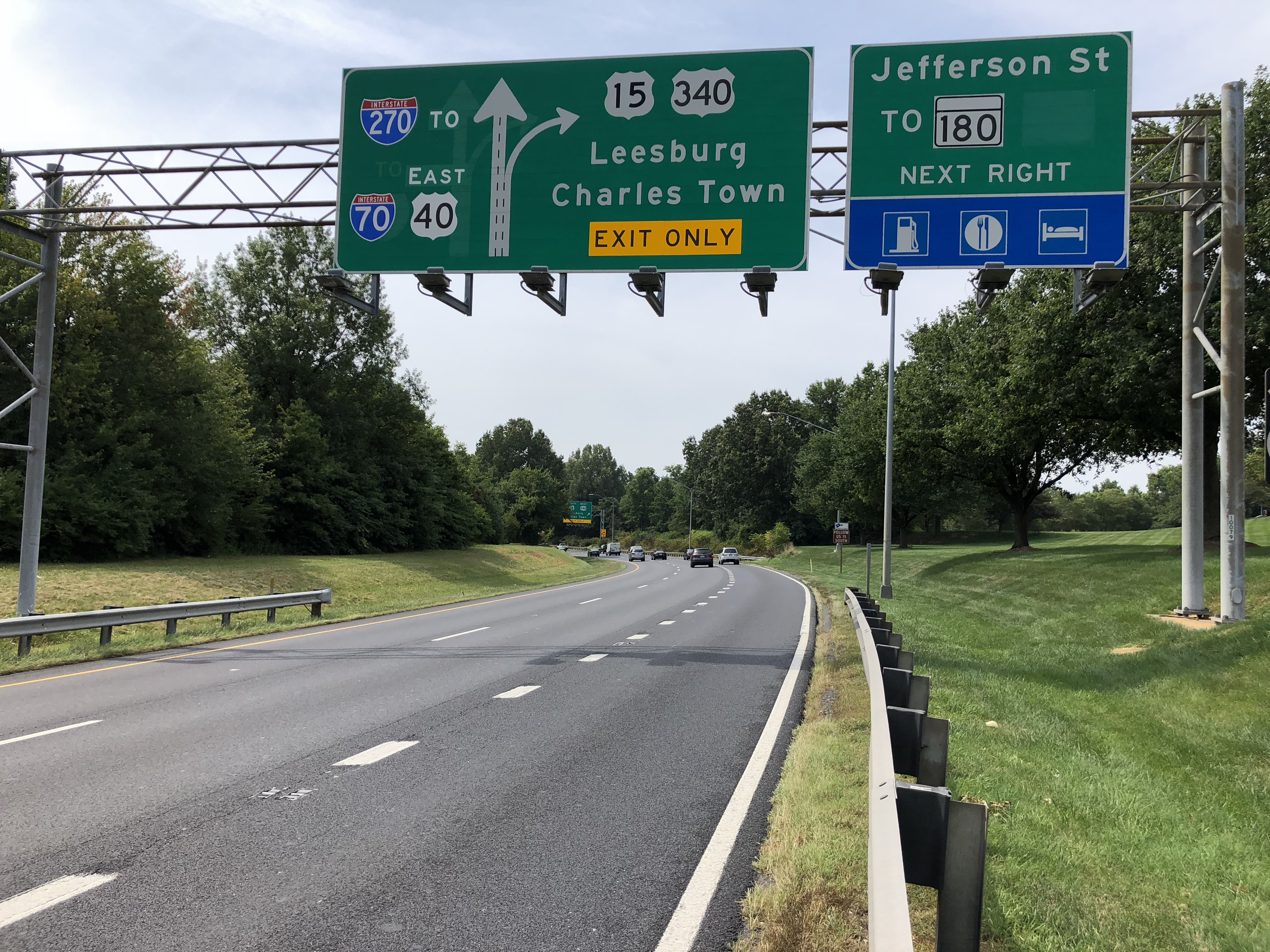
US 15 southbound and US 40 eastbound in Frederick, just before separating from US 40 and joining US 340

When the U.S. Numbered Highway System was laid out in 1926, US 15 did not enter Maryland. US 240 followed US 15's current corridor from Frederick north to near Harrisburg. No U.S. Highway connected Frederick and Leesburg via Point of Rocks. By the end of 1927, US 240 was reduced to a Washington–Frederick highway and US 15 connected Point of Rocks and Emmitsburg via Frederick as it does today.

=== Original construction and early improvements ===
US 15 was established partially along what had been a pair of turnpikes. The Frederick and Emmitsburg Turnpike connected Emmitsburg with Harmony Grove which was located at the northern end of Market Street at MD 26 on the north side of Frederick. The Frederick and Buckeystown Turnpike ran from its co-terminus with the Frederick and Monocacy Turnpike at Evergreen Point at what is today the junction of MD 85 and MD 355, south to one mile (1.6 km) south of Buckeystown. When the Maryland State Roads Commission (MDSRC) designated highways to be improved as part of a state road system in 1909, the Frederick–Emmitsburg highway was included in the new system. The MDSRC originally planned to build the state road north from the city of Frederick along the Frederick and Opossumtown Turnpike, then turn east along Hayward Road to meet the Frederick and Emmitsburg Turnpike at Harmony Grove.

The MDSRC purchased the Frederick and Emmitsburg Turnpike from its operating company in 1911. The first section of the turnpike to be rebuilt as a modern road was between Tuscarora Creek north of Frederick and just north of Sundays Lane near Hansonville in 1911. The old turnpike was resurfaced as a 14-foot-wide (4.3 m) macadam road from Lewistown to Thurmont in 1914 and from Harmony Grove to Lewistown in 1915. The Gettysburg Road from Emmitsburg to the Pennsylvania state line was also paved in 1915. The gaps between Thurmont and Emmitsburg and between the city of Frederick and Harmony Grove were resurfaced between 1915 and 1919; the Frederick–Harmony Grove road followed the turnpike right-of-way north from Worman's Mill rather than the 1910 planned route via Opossumtown Pike.

The right-of-way of the Frederick and Buckeystown Turnpike was resurfaced with macadam by 1921. The remainder of Buckeystown Pike was paved as a 15-foot-wide (4.6 m) concrete road from south of Buckeystown to around Lily Pons Road in 1918 and 1919 and south of Lily Pons Road to just north of the modern MD 28 junction in Tuscarora by 1921. The concrete highway was extended south through the MD 28 junction to modern MD 28's junction with Nolands Ferry Road by 1923. That same year, Emmitsburg Pike was paved through Thurmont. In 1926, the MDSRC assumed maintenance of and resurfaced Market Street with asphalt from the city of Frederick between the south city limit at New Design Road (now Stadium Drive) to the north city limit at 9th Street. The commission also replaced Buckeystown Pike's covered bridge at Ballenger Creek with the modern concrete arch bridge that year. US 15 was widened to a width of 20 feet (6.1 m) from Frederick to the Pennsylvania state line around 1930. The highway from Tuscarora to Point of Rocks was constructed as a concrete road in three stages starting in 1929, when the paved highway was extended west from Nolands Ferry Road to west of New Design Road. The second section of the new highway was started in 1930. The third segment was finished in 1933, which completed the paving of US 15 in Maryland. Around 1938, the U.S. Highway was resurfaced with asphalt from Emmitsburg to the Pennsylvania state line and from the south end of Frederick to Evergreen Point; in addition, a grade separation was constructed with the Western Maryland Railway in Thurmont.

=== Point of Rocks Bridge ===
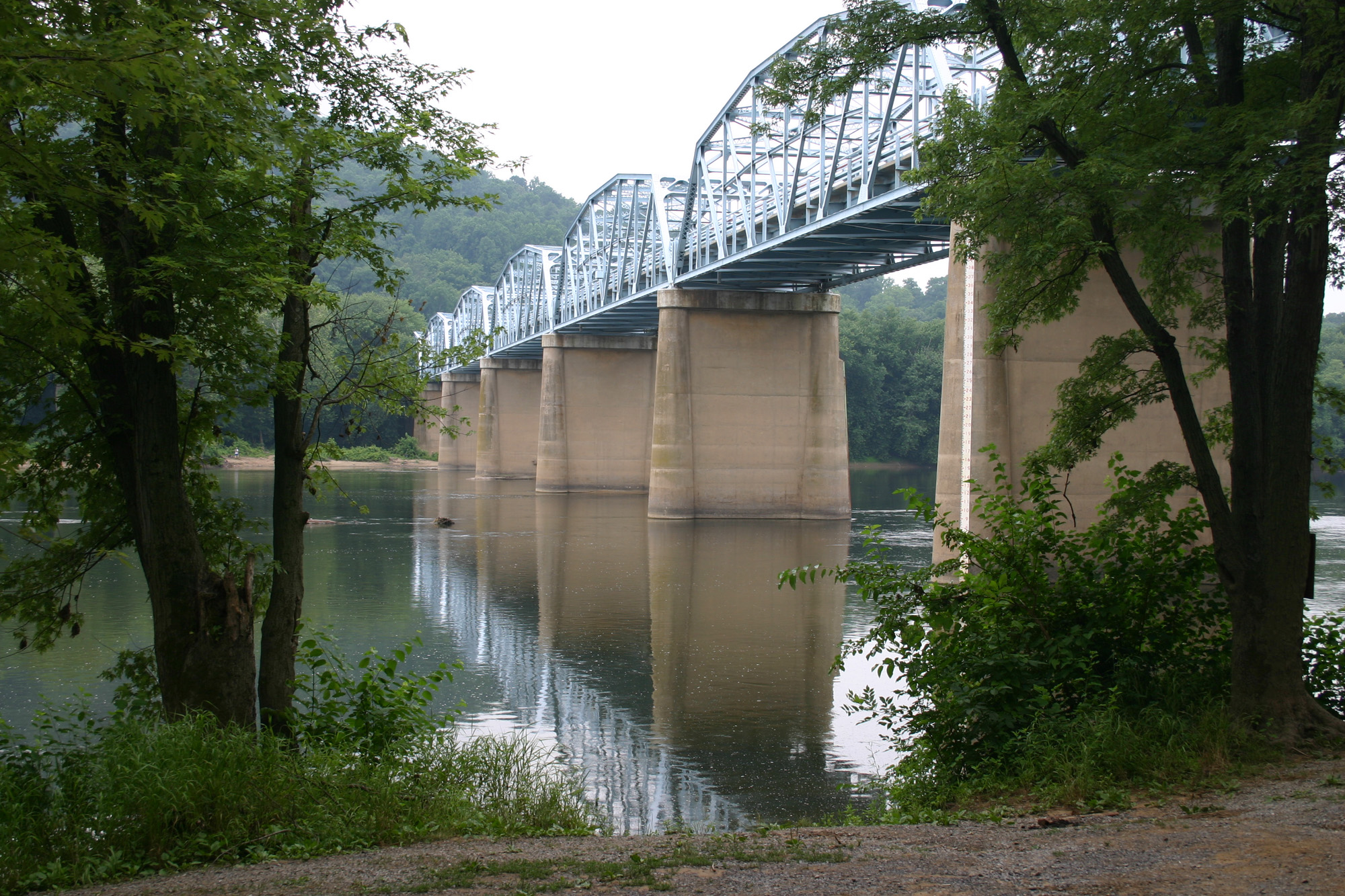
Riverside view from the Maryland side of the Point of Rocks Bridge, which carries US 15 across the Potomac River at Point of Rocks

Several ferries crossed the Potomac River at Point of Rocks before the first bridge was constructed there in 1852. This wooden bridge was constructed to carry a double-track narrow gauge railroad from a junction with the Baltimore and Ohio Railroad to a blast furnace to process the area's iron ore. This bridge, which also carried wagons and horses, was destroyed on June 9, 1861, by Confederate forces under General Turner Ashby, the same day the bridge at Brunswick was destroyed. The second bridge at Point of Rocks was an iron bridge constructed in 1889. US 15 originally followed Commerce Street and Canal Road, which is now used to access the Chesapeake and Ohio Canal National Historical Park, through an at-grade crossing of the Baltimore and Ohio Railroad to the Maryland end of the bridge, which crossed the river immediately to the east of the modern bridge. The 1889 iron bridge was swept away in the March 1936 flood that also destroyed the Potomac River crossings at Harpers Ferry, Shepherdstown, and Hancock.

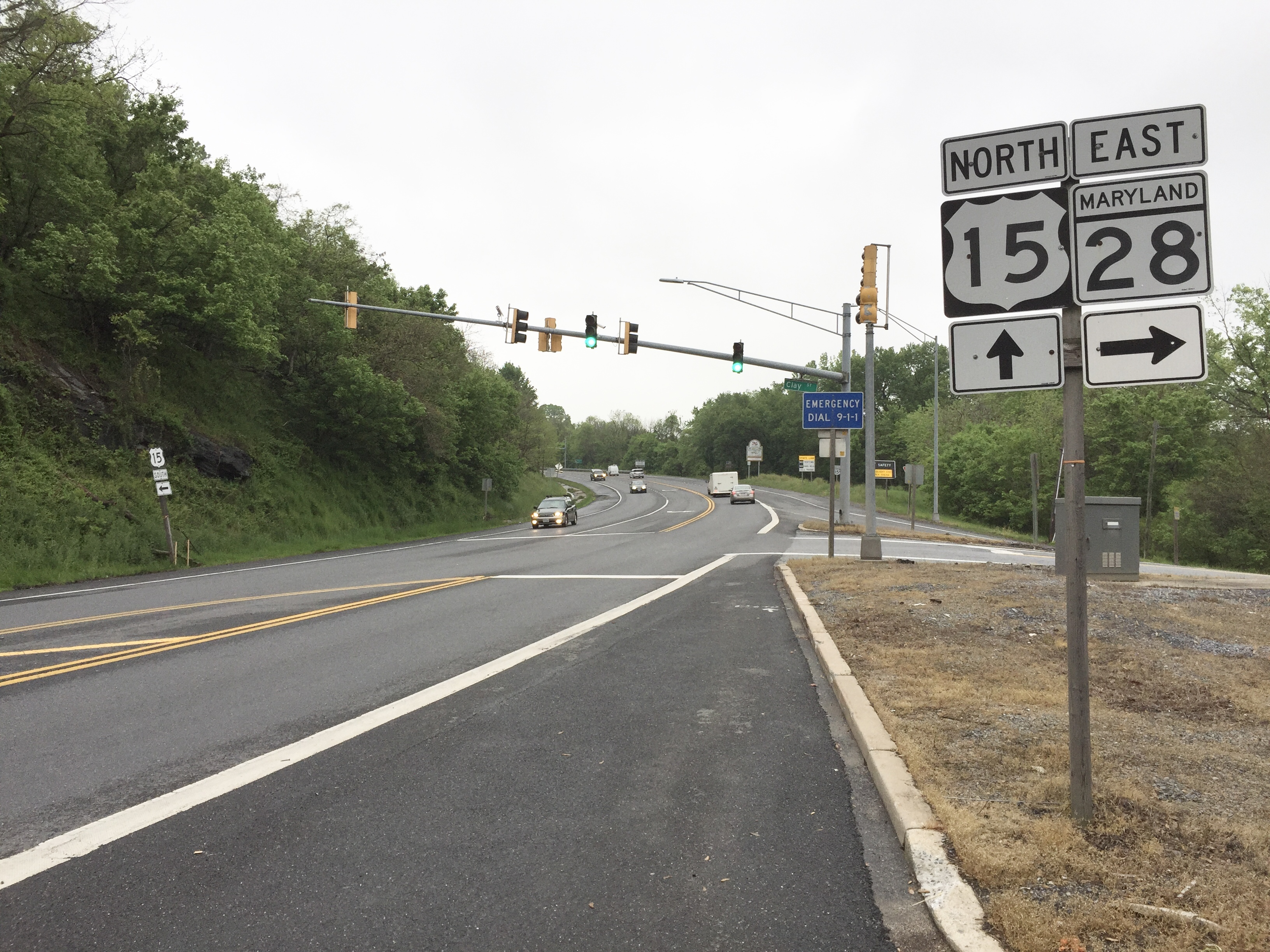
View north along US 15 at MD 28 just north of Point of Rocks Bridge

In November 1936, the MDSRC put together a plan to replace the Potomac River bridges at Hancock, Shepherdstown, and Point of Rocks. The Point of Rocks Bridge became the first of the three crossings to be started when construction began March 25, 1937; the bridge's concrete piers were completed and the piers of the old bridge were removed from the river by September of that year. The new bridge and its approaches, which crossed over the Baltimore and Ohio Railroad on the Maryland side, opened December 26, 1937. The camelback truss bridge spans 1,689 feet (515 m) and has a 24-foot-wide (7.3 m) roadway and a pair of three-foot-wide (0.91 m) sidewalks. US 15 followed a temporary approach to the new bridge along Commerce Street that remained vulnerable to major floods. The U.S. Highway was moved to higher ground on Clay Street when the highway was reconstructed and widened from Point of Rocks to Tuscarora in 1949.

=== Relocation through Frederick ===
The first relocation of US 15 north of Frederick occurred at Tuscarora Creek between 1950 and 1952. Construction on Washington National Pike, which is now I-270, began in 1950. The highway's cloverleaf interchange with US 15, which would serve as the freeway's northern terminus for several years, was built in 1952 and 1953. The adjacent portion of US 15 from Evergreen Point south to Lime Kiln was relocated, reconstructed, and widened in 1951 and 1952. In 1954, US 240 was moved to Washington National Pike; the old alignment became US 240 Alternate and then MD 355 in 1956. The section of freeway from US 15 to the Frederick Freeway was built between 1954 and 1956 concurrent with the first section of the Frederick Freeway. The original interchange between the Frederick Freeway and Washington National Pike included two ramps between the north–south and east–west portions of the Frederick Freeway.

The first section of the Frederick Freeway opened from US 40 (now MD 144) east of Frederick to a temporary half-cloverleaf interchange with Patrick Street in 1956; this section featured a cloverleaf interchange with US 340. The remainder of the Frederick Freeway from Patrick Street to MD 26 was placed under construction in 1956. The highway was constructed as a two-lane freeway from just south of its interchange with Rosemont Avenue to its northern end near Hayward Road, where the freeway tied into existing US 15 at Harmony Grove. The freeway north of Patrick Street featured interchanges with Rosemont Avenue, Motter Avenue, and a westward extension of MD 26. When the Frederick Freeway opened in 1959, US 15 was moved to Washington National Pike north of Buckeystown Pike and north through Frederick along the Frederick Freeway. Market Street north of Evergreen Point through downtown Frederick to US 15 north of the city became a northward extension of MD 355; the section of Buckeystown Pike from the freeway to Evergreen Point became a section of MD 806.

In 1960, US 15 from the MD 26 interchange to Harmony Grove was expanded to a divided highway. The Frederick Freeway gained exit numbers in 1965, the same year the highway's interchange with 7th Street was added. The exit numbers ranged from 1 at the freeway's interchange with MD 144 east of Frederick to 9 at the highway's interchange with MD 26; the 7th Street interchange became exit 7A. The two-lane section of the freeway was expanded to its present four-lane configuration in 1969, the same year the US 340 freeway was completed between Jefferson and Frederick. US 15's present alignment from Point of Rocks to US 340 was also under construction by 1969. When the new highway opened in 1970, US 15 was moved to the new highway and joined US 340 in a concurrency along Jefferson National Pike from Jefferson to the Frederick Freeway. The old section of US 15 from Point of Rocks to Tuscarora became a westward extension of MD 28. Buckeystown Pike from MD 28 to Washington National Pike was designated MD 85, which was extended north to MD 355 the following year. The U.S. Highway's interchange with Mt. Zion Road opened in 1972.

=== Bypasses and expansion north of Frederick ===
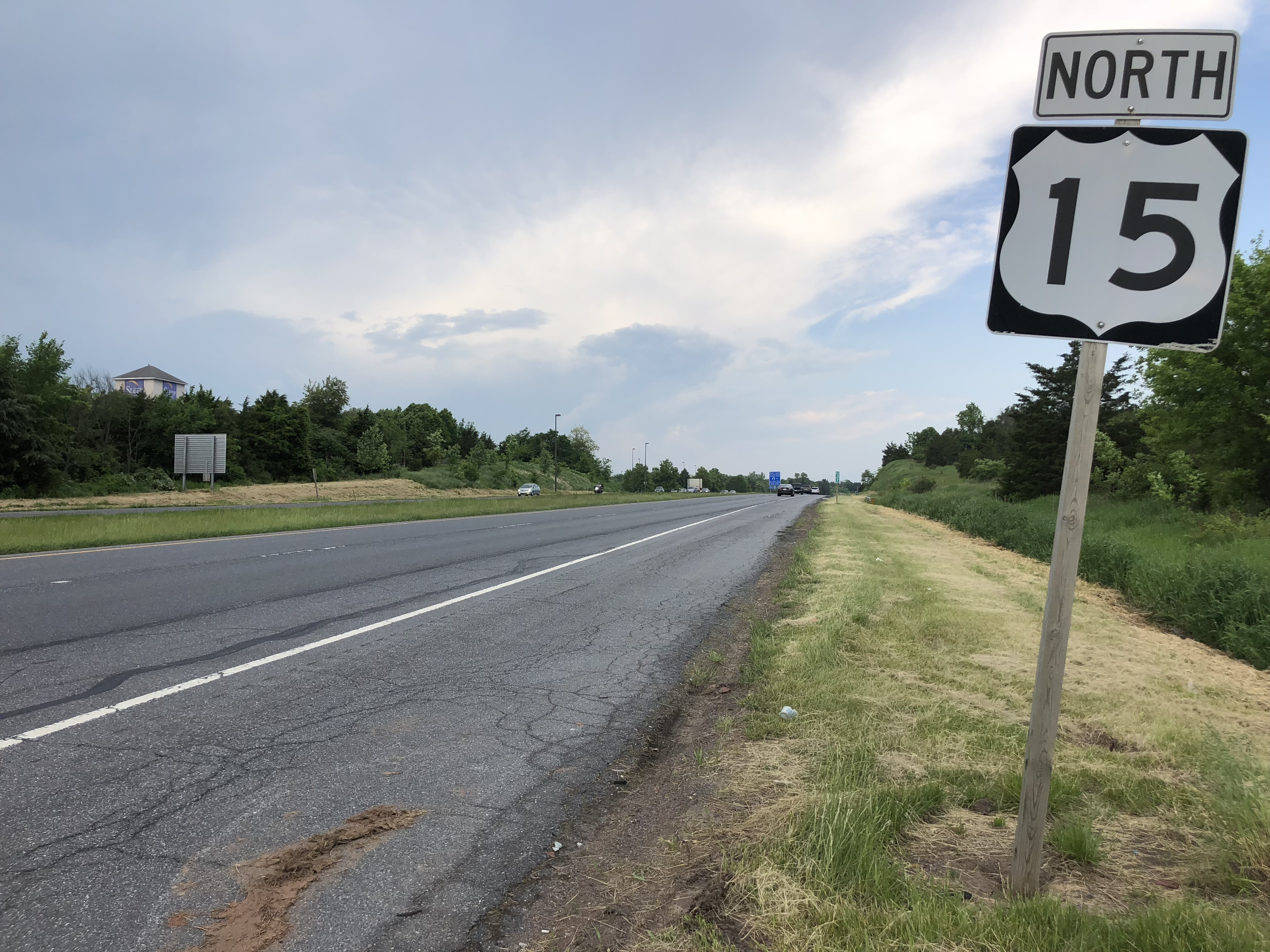
US 15 northbound past MD 140 in Emmitsburg

US 15 was widened from downtown Thurmont north to Owens Creek starting in 1953. That same year, the highway was relocated as the first carriageway of an ultimate divided highway from Owens Creek to just south of the intersection of US 15 with St. Anthony and Orndorff roads south of Mount St. Mary's University. In 1956, construction began on the Thurmont Bypass, which was constructed as the first carriageway of an ultimate divided highway from south of Catoctin Furnace to just south of Owens Creek. The bypass, which included an interchange with MD 77, was completed in 1958. The MD 77 interchange originally consisted of one two-way ramp in the northeast quadrant of the junction. The old alignment of US 15 through Catoctin Furnace and Thurmont was designated MD 806 by 1960. US 15's interchange with MD 550 was built in 1972.

Several other sections of US 15 were bypassed in the 1960s. The highway bypassed Lewistown in 1962, leaving behind its old alignment of Hessong Bridge Road and Angleberger Road, which became a section of MD 806. Construction on the U.S. Highway's bypass of Emmitsburg began in 1963. The following year, the portion of US 15 from the northern end of the bypass to the Pennsylvania state line opened contemporaneously with US 15's bypass of Gettysburg. The Emmitsburg bypass was completed in 1965; the old road through the town was designated US 15 Business by 1967. MD 140's overpass of US 15 was constructed in 1971; the old alignment of MD 140 was used for interchange ramps between the two highways.

US 15 was expanded to a divided highway north of Frederick between 1972 and 1985. The U.S. Highway was expanded to four lanes from MD 355 at Harmony Grove to Angleberger Road in Lewistown in 1973. Four-laning of US 15 continued in 1981 when the highway was expanded from the intersection with St. Anthony and Orndorff roads south of Mount St. Mary's University to just south of the Pennsylvania state line near Emmitsburg. This section of divided highway was extended south through the MD 550 interchange in 1983. As part of this project, the oblique intersection with MD 806 on the north side of Thurmont was removed. MD 806 was moved onto Albert Staub Road, which was extended north over a new crossing of Owens Creek to its present terminus at Roddy Creek Road, where local traffic could access US 15 at a perpendicular intersection. The two-lane highway between Lewistown and MD 550 was expanded to a four-lane divided highway in 1985. The MD 77 interchange was completed with the construction of the southbound US 15 ramps in the southwest quadrant of the junction. A third interchange was added on the south side of Thurmont as a connector between US 15 and MD 806 in 1985 as well. US 15's expansion to a four-lane divided highway north of Frederick was completed in 1989 when the piece of highway at the Pennsylvania state line was expanded to four lanes contemporaneous with the four-laning of the Gettysburg bypass.

=== Recent and future projects ===
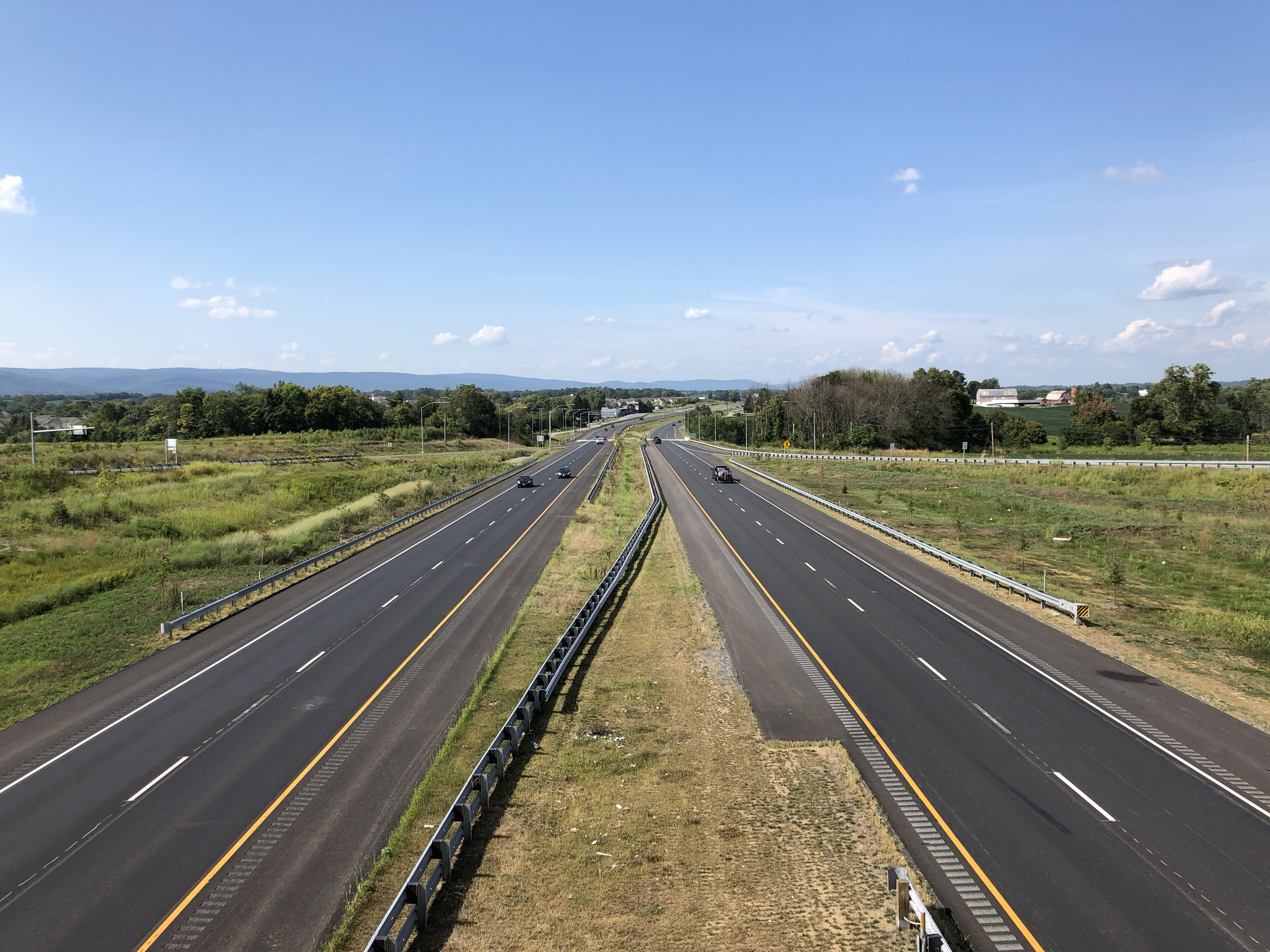
US 15 northbound at Monocacy Boulevard in Frederick

US 15 in Frederick is a subject of the I-270/US 15 Multi-Modal Corridor Study, which encompasses the corridor of the two highways from I-270's interchange with Shady Grove Road in Montgomery County to north of US 15's intersection with Biggs Ford Road north of Frederick. The study was started by the Maryland State Highway Administration (MDSHA) and Maryland Transportation Authority in the mid-1990s to examine upgrades to the highway and transit infrastructure within the corridor. As part of another long-term project initiated by the I-70 Corridor Planning Study, Jefferson National Pike's interchange with I-70, which was constructed with two ramps in 1969, received two ramps from eastbound I-70 in 1997; that same year, access from northbound US 15 and US 340 to westbound I-70 was added at the Frederick Freeway interchange. Exit numbers on US 15's portions of Jefferson National Pike and the Frederick Freeway were changed to their present numbers in 2002. The interchange between Jefferson National Pike and the Frederick Freeway was transformed from a cloverleaf to a partial cloverleaf interchange in 2004. Access between US 15 and the northern end of MD 355, then named Wormans Mill Road, was removed in 2006, the same year a ramp was added from westbound MD 26 to northbound US 15. The roundabout at the US 15–MD 464 intersection in Point of Rocks was built in 2009.

MDOT SHA replaced Motter Avenue's bridge over US 15 because the concrete deck of the old bridge was deteriorating and the four-lane width of the bridge was insufficient for the traffic it carried. The new bridge has four through traffic lanes, bike lanes, and continuous left turn lanes. The replacement bridge is long enough to accommodate future widening of US 15. Construction began in early 2012 and was completed in early 2015. The new bridge was built in two sections: one half of the bridge was constructed immediately to the north of the old bridge, then traffic was moved to the half-bridge and the old bridge removed, and the other half of the new bridge was constructed in place of the removed bridge.

In 2011, MDOT SHA completed a study to examine constructing an interchange at Monocacy Boulevard on the north side of Frederick to replace the present directional crossover intersection. Design work then occurred on a diamond interchange with the municipal highway, which serves as a circumferential arterial in the northeastern part of the city. Monocacy Boulevard was extended west to north–south Thomas Johnson Drive and meet the eastern end of Christophers Crossing, which is a circumferential boulevard throughout northwestern Frederick. As part of this project, US 15's intersection with Hayward Road was removed, resulting in the northern end of US 15's freeway section being extended from MD 26 to Tuscarora Creek. The interchange with Monocacy Boulevard/Christophers Crossing was completed in 2018. In 2015, an interchange opened at Jefferson Technology Parkway.

MDOT SHA expanded and moved the park and ride lot at the interchange of US 15 and Mt. Zion Road nearby, opening on August 29, 2022.

== Junction list ==
The entire route is in Frederick County.

Location	mi	km	Exit	Destinations	Notes
Potomac River	0.00	0.00		US 15 south (James Monroe Highway) – Leesburg	Continuation into Virginia
Potomac River	0.00	0.00	Maryland–Virginia state line		
Point of Rocks	0.37	0.60		MD 28 east (Clay Street) – Tuscarora	Western terminus of MD 28
Point of Rocks	0.37	0.60	Southern end of limited-access section		
Point of Rocks	1.40	2.25		MD 464 (Point of Rocks Road) – Brunswick	Roundabout
	7.22	11.62		US 340 west (Jefferson National Pike) – Charles Town	Southbound exit and northbound entrance; southern end of US 340 concurrency
Frederick	8.84	14.23		Mount Zion Road	
Frederick	10.50	16.90	9	Jefferson Technology Parkway (MD 872G)	
Frederick	11.30	18.19	10	I-70 east to I-270 south – Baltimore, Washington	Northbound exit and southbound entrance; exit 52 on I-70
Frederick	11.54	18.57	11	MD 180 west (Jefferson Pike) / Ballenger Creek Pike	Exit number not signed southbound
Frederick	11.93	19.20	12	Jefferson Street to I-70 west – Hagerstown US 340 ends	Northbound exit and southbound entrance; eastern terminus of US 340; signed as exits 12A (I-70) and 12B (Jefferson)
Frederick	11.93	19.20		US 40 east / Jefferson Street to I-70 / I-270 south	No northbound exit; southern end of US 40 concurrency
Frederick	12.63	20.33	13	US 40 west (Patrick Street)	Northern end of US 40 concurrency; signed as exits 13A (east) and 13B (west)
Frederick	13.40	21.57	14	Rosemont Avenue	
Frederick	13.91	22.39	15	7th Street	
Frederick	14.60	23.50	16	Motter Avenue	
Frederick	15.14	24.37	17	MD 26 east (Liberty Road) to MD 194 – Libertytown, Walkersville	No southbound exit; western terminus of MD 26
Frederick	16.14	25.97	18	Monocacy Boulevard / Christophers Crossing (MD 806T)	
Catoctin Furnace	24.64	39.65		MD 806 north (Catoctin Furnace Road)	At-grade intersection; southern terminus of MD 806
Thurmont	27.83	44.79		MD 806 (Catoctin Furnace Road) to Frederick Road – Thurmont	Access via MD 15C
Thurmont	28.60	46.03		MD 77 (W. Main Street) – Thurmont	Partial cloverleaf interchange
Thurmont	29.42	47.35		MD 550 (Church Street) – Thurmont, Sabillasville	Diamond interchange
Emmitsburg	33.53	53.96		MD 76 south (Motters Station Road) / St. Anthonys Road – Rocky Ridge	At-grade intersection; northern terminus of MD 76
Emmitsburg	35.02	56.36		US 15 Bus. north (S. Seton Avenue) / Old Frederick Road	At-grade intersection; southern terminus of US 15 Bus.
Emmitsburg	36.60	58.90		MD 140 (Main Street) – Emmitsburg, Taneytown	
Emmitsburg	37.38	60.16		US 15 Bus. south (N. Seton Avenue) / Welty Road	At-grade intersection
Emmitsburg	37.85	60.91		US 15 north – Gettysburg	Continuation into Pennsylvania
1.000 mi = 1.609 km; 1.000 km = 0.621 mi: Concurrency terminus; Incomplete access

== Related routes ==
=== Special route ===
US 15 has one business loop in Emmitsburg, known as Seton Avenue and traveling 2.34 miles (3.77 km).

=== Auxiliary routes ===
US 15 has five unsigned auxiliary routes. Two of them have a Maryland state route number designation.

- US 15A is the designation for the 0.04-mile (0.064 km) section of Biggs Ford Road immediately east of its intersection with US 15 north of Frederick.
- US 15B is the designation for the 0.19-mile (0.31 km) section of Jefferson Street from the center of US 15's bridge over the Frederick Freeway to just west of Jefferson Street's intersection with Pearl Street in the city of Frederick. The western terminus of US 15B is also the eastern terminus of US 340.
- MD 15C is the designation for the unnamed 0.12-mile (0.19 km) roadway within US 15's diamond interchange on the southern edge of Thurmont. The roadway continues as Tippin Drive to the west of the interchange and Thurmont Boulevard to the east. Thurmont Boulevard ends at Frederick Road, which becomes MD 806 just to the south at the town limit of Thurmont.
- MD 15D is the designation for the 0.04-mile (0.064 km) section of Sandy Spring Lane immediately north of its intersection with US 15 in Thurmont.
- US 15G is the designation for the 0.14-mile (0.23 km) section of Blue Mountain Road between US 15 and MD 806 south of Thurmont.

== See also ==
U.S. Route 15
Previous state: Virginia	Maryland	Next state: Pennsylvania
