= Maryland Route 550 =

State highway in Maryland, United States

Maryland Route 550
- Maryland Route 550 highlighted in red

Route information
- Maintained by MDSHA
- Length: 24.43 mi (39.32 km)
- Existed: 1933–present
- Tourist routes: Journey Through Hallowed Ground Byway

Major junctions
- South end: MD 26 in Libertytown
- MD 194 in Woodsboro; MD 77 in Thurmont; US 15 in Thurmont; MD 491 in Fort Ritchie
- North end: Pen Mar Road in Fort Ritchie

Location
- Country: United States
- State: Maryland
- Counties: Frederick, Washington

Highway system
- Maryland highway system; Interstate; US; State; Scenic Byways
← MD 547	→ MD 552

Maryland Route 550 (MD 550) is a state highway in the U.S. state of Maryland. The state highway runs 24.43 miles (39.32 km) from MD 26 in Libertytown north to Pen Mar Road in Fort Ritchie. MD 550 runs southeast–northwest across central Frederick County, connecting Fort Ritchie in the northeastern corner of Washington County and Libertytown with the towns of Thurmont and Woodsboro and the smaller communities of Creagerstown and Sabillasville. South of the highway's junction with U.S. Route 15 (US 15) in Thurmont, the state highway passes through the wide valley of the Monocacy River; to the north, the highway passes along the northern edge of Catoctin Mountain and crests South Mountain near Blue Ridge Summit, Pennsylvania.

MD 550 was built in two main sections. The highway from Thurmont to Blue Ridge Summit was constructed in the mid-1920s as Maryland Route 81 (MD 81). MD 81 was extended west to Fort Ritchie in the mid-1930s. MD 550 was constructed from Libertytown to Woodsboro in the mid to late 1930s. A second disjoint section of the state highway was built from Creagerstown to Thurmont in the late 1930s. The two segments of MD 550 were united when the designation was assigned to the highway between Woodsboro and Creagerstown in the mid-1950s. MD 550 was extended northwest from Thurmont to Fort Ritchie, assuming all of MD 81, in the late 1970s.

== Route description ==
=== Libertytown to Thurmont ===
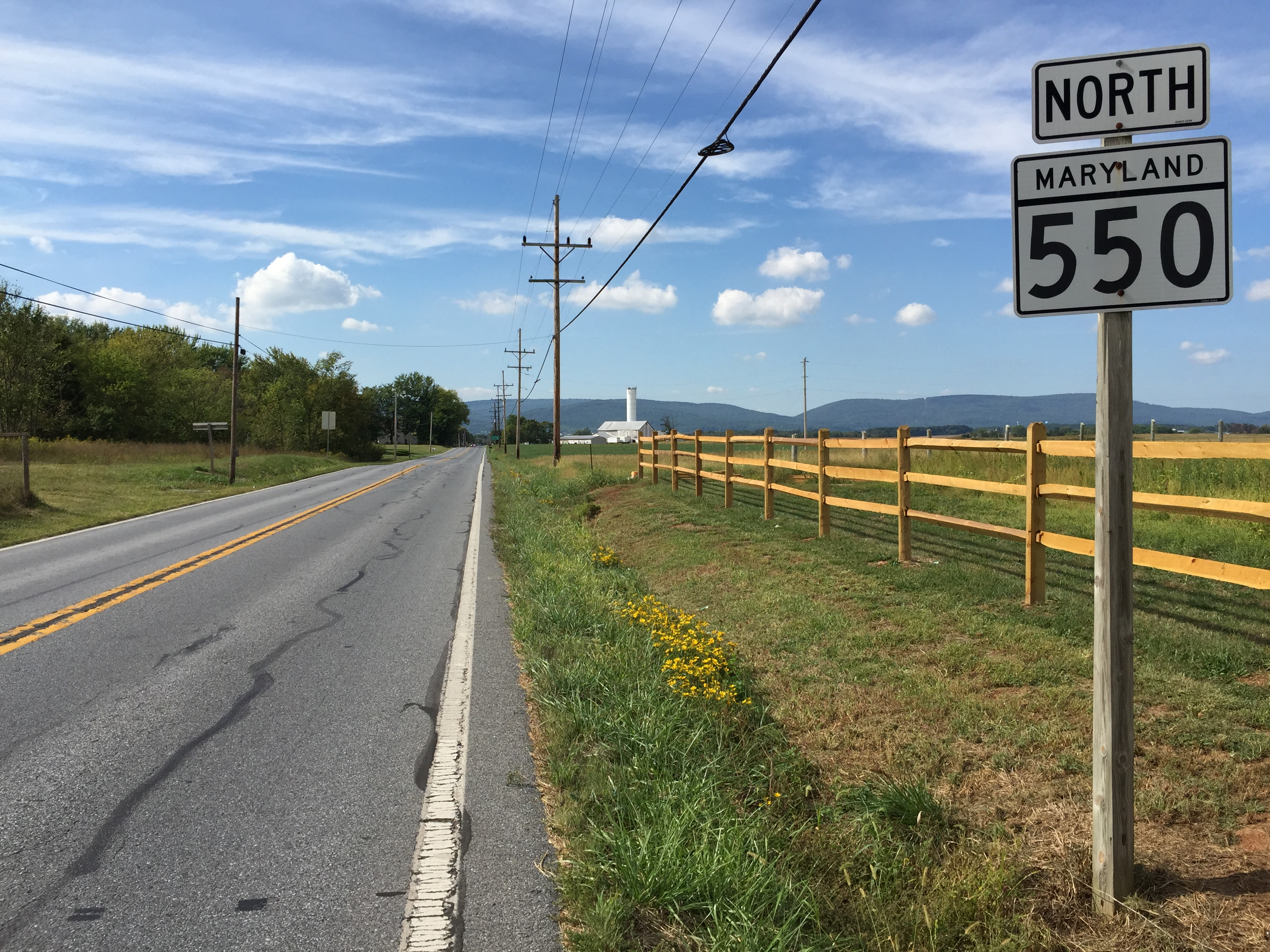
View north along MD 550 just north of Creagerstown

MD 550 begins at an intersection with MD 26 (Main Street) in the unincorporated village of Libertytown and heads northwest as Woodsboro Road. The highway passes through the Piedmont uplands, a region of rounded hills, low ridges, relatively high relief, irregular plains, and narrow valleys with a mix of farms and forests. MD 550 crosses Cabbage Run and Dorcas Branch, follows Dorcas Branch through a gap in Laurel Hill, and enters the town of Woodsboro just after crossing Israel Creek. MD 550 turns north and runs concurrently with MD 194 on Woodsboro Pike on the east side of the town; Liberty Road heads west from the intersection toward the center of town. MD 550 turns west onto Woodsboro–Creagerstown Road, which immediately intersects the north end of Main Street (MD 194A). The state highway intersects the MDOT Branch of the Maryland Midland Railway and receives the north end of Creagerstown Road before leaving Woodsboro.

MD 550 continues northwest through the Piedmont lowlands, which contain wide and undulating ridges, broad nearly level valleys, limited local relief, and a mosaic of farms, houses, and woodland. North of the route's bridge across the Monocacy River, the highway parallels Pennterra Manor Lane, which leads to the 18th century farmhouse Pennterra. MD 550 also passes to the west of another 18th century farmhouse, Strawberry Hill, before reaching the unincorporated village of Creagerstown. The route’s name changes to Creagerstown Road at Old Frederick Road at the south end of village, and at Blacks Mill Road the road passes to the east of the St. John's Church at Creagerstown Historic District, which preserves a pair of church buildings—the early 20th-century St. John’s Evangelical Lutheran Church and the 19th-century building of the defunct St. John’s Reformed Church—as well as the first church’s parish house and a cemetery. MD 550 continues northwest as Creagerstown Road to the hamlet of Jimtown; the highway intersects Moser Road and Hessong Bridge at a four-legged intersection and turns north onto Jimtown Road toward Thurmont.

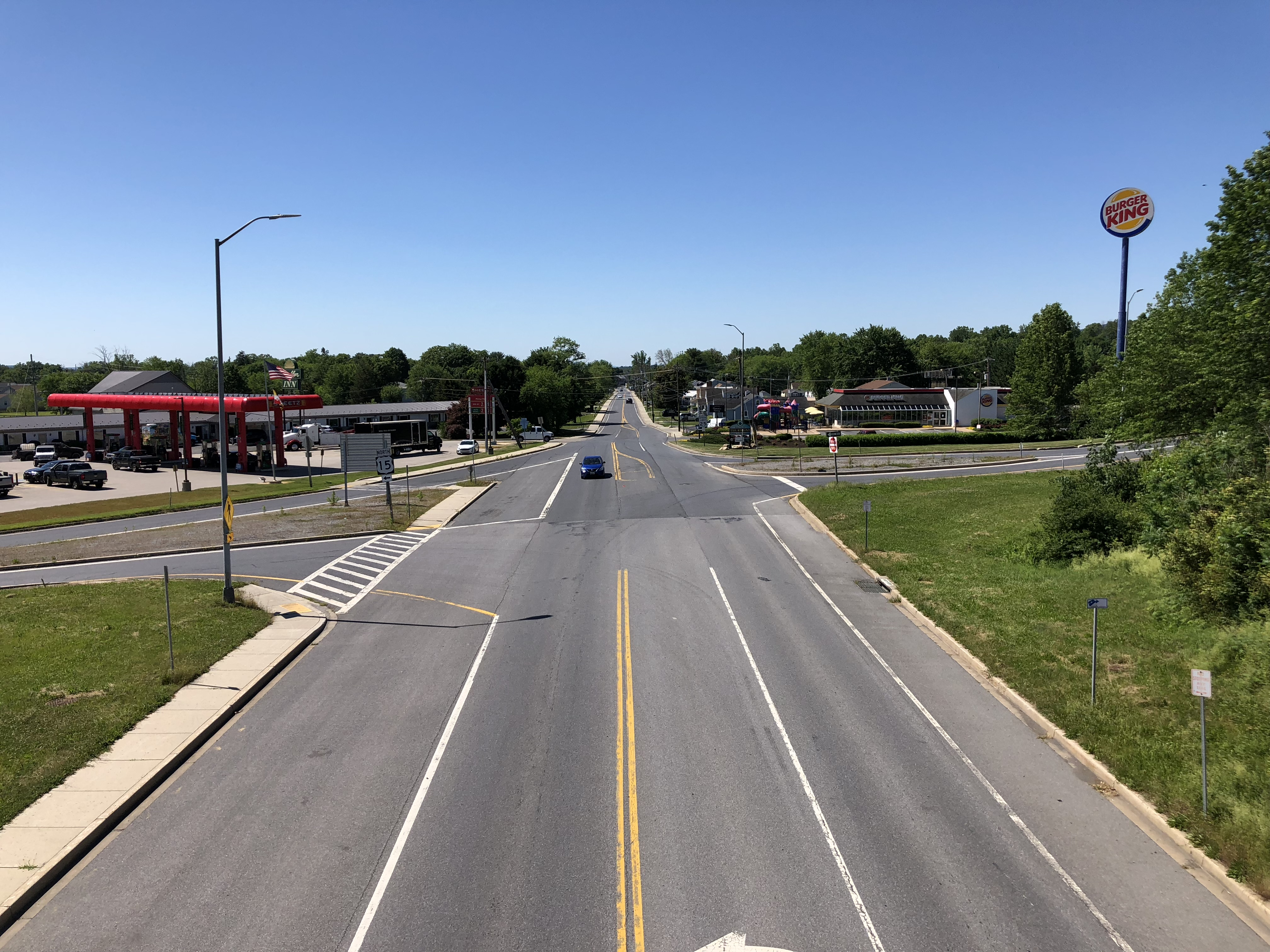
View south along MD 550 from US 15 in Thurmont

MD 550 enters the town of Thurmont just before the highway intersects MD 77 (Rocky Ridge Road). The two state highways run concurrently northwest toward downtown Thurmont on Main Street. In the center of town, at Water Street, MD 77 continues west on Main Street while MD 550 turns north onto Church Street, which passes under the Main Line of the Maryland Midland Railway and meets the south end of MD 806 (Emmitsburg Road). At the northern edge of Thurmont, the state highway meets US 15 (Catoctin Mountain Highway) at a diamond interchange and passes Catoctin High School.

=== Thurmont to Highfield–Cascade ===
MD 550 heads northwest as Sabillasville Road into the Blue Ridge Mountains, which comprise extensively forested, steep, and well-dissected ridges separated by deep, narrow valleys with patches of farmland. The highway crosses Owens Creek and parallels the Maryland Midland Railway through the creek’s gorge upstream between Piney Mountain to the north and Catoctin Mountain to the south; the highway passes under the rail line twice. At Foxville Deerfield Road, MD 550 leaves Owens Creek and its gorge and passes through the Harbaugh Valley, where the highway crosses Friends Creek. After passing through the unincorporated village of Sabillasville and intersecting Bentzel Road on the north side of the village, the highway leaves the valley and ascends the eastern flank of South Mountain. MD 550 passes under a curve of the railroad and meets the ends of Old Sabillasville Road and Cullen Drive west of the Victor Cullen Center. The Victor Cullen Center is a state youth detention center originally constructed in the first decade of the 20th century as the state’s first tuberculosis sanatorium, whose preserved historic remains include the power house and old administration building.

MD 550 curves west parallel to the Maryland Midland Railway and summits South Mountain at the Frederick–Washington county line about 400 feet (120 m) south of the Pennsylvania state line. The highway continues as Fort Ritchie Road, which curves southwest through the unincorporated communities of Highfield and Cascade, where south of Royer Road the route’s name changes to Military Road. At the entrance to the former Fort Ritchie, MD 550 meets the northern end of MD 491 (McAfee Hill Road) and turns northwest onto that road. The highway intersects CSX's Hanover Subdivision rail line at grade, turns from McAfee Hill Road onto Pen Mar Road, and passes under the railroad and by Lake Royer. MD 550 reaches its northern terminus west of the lake at the edge of Camp Louise, a girls' summer camp founded in 1922; Pen Mar Road continues as a county highway toward the community of Pen Mar and Pen Mar Park.

== History ==
Maryland Route 81
- Location: Thurmont–Fort Ritchie
- Existed: 1927–1977

MD 550 was constructed in two main sections: MD 550 between Libertytown and Thurmont, and MD 81 from Thurmont to Fort Ritchie. The first section of the Libertytown–Thurmont portion of MD 550 was constructed as a segment of former MD 72. MD 72 followed Lewistown Road and Old Frederick Road from US 15 at Lewistown east and north through Creagerstown to near Loys Station south of MD 77. The portion of MD 72 through Creagerstown was built in 1926. The first section of MD 550 proper was 1 mile (1.6 km) of concrete road built east from Woodsboro in 1933. MD 550 was extended east to Cabbage Run between 1933 and 1935. A second section of MD 550 was started from MD 77 east of Thurmont towards Creagerstown in 1938. This western section was completed in 1939, the same year the eastern section was completed between Woodsboro and Libertytown.

The first section of what would become MD 81 was paved as a state-aid road from the Pennsylvania state line south along Warren Avenue and Cascade Road through Highfield and Cascade by 1910. The main portion of MD 81 was constructed from Emmitsburg Road (which later became US 15 and is now MD 806) north to Sabillasville around 1923. The highway was completed to the Pennsylvania state line at Blue Ridge Summit, using what are now Naylor Road and Old Sabillasville Road, around 1927. The pre-1910 portion of MD 81 in Washington County was reconstructed and extended west toward Pen Mar in 1930. Military Road was constructed around 1933 between Highfield and Fort Ritchie. The eastern end of Military Road at the Frederick–Washington county line was tied into a relocation of MD 81 between Sabillasville and Blue Ridge Summit that was completed in 1936. This bypass included an underpass of the Western Maryland Railway at Sabillasville and resulted in the highway no longer entering Pennsylvania; the old alignment of MD 81 was designated MD 625.

In 1956, MD 72 was removed from the state highway system. MD 550 was extended southeast through Creagerstown to Woodsboro to connect with the Woodsboro–Libertytown section. MD 550 was extended through Thurmont, west along MD 77 and north along MD 806, and assumed all of MD 81 in 1977. Construction on MD 194's bypass of Woodsboro was started in 1995. When the bypass was completed in 1997, MD 550 was removed from the center of Woodsboro to its present alignment on the northern and eastern sides of town.

== Junction list ==
County	Location	mi	km	Destinations	Notes
Frederick	Libertytown	0.00	0.00	MD 26 (Liberty Road) / Mill Street south – Frederick, Baltimore	Southern terminus
Frederick	Woodsboro	5.01	8.06	MD 194 south (Woodsboro Pike) / Woodsboro Road west – Walkersville	South end of concurrency with MD 194
Frederick	Woodsboro	5.56	8.95	MD 194 north (Woodsboro Pike) – Taneytown	North end of concurrency with MD 194
Frederick	Woodsboro	5.61	9.03	Main Street south	MD 550 turns northwest at this intersection; Main Street is unsigned MD 194A
Frederick	Thurmont	11.67	18.78	Hessong Bridge Road south / Moser Road west	MD 550 turns north onto Jimtown Road
Frederick	Thurmont	12.92	20.79	MD 77 east (Rocky Ridge Road) – Rocky Ridge	South end of concurrency with MD 77
Frederick	Thurmont	13.91	22.39	MD 77 west (Main Street) / Water Street south – Smithsburg	MD 550 turns north onto Church Street; north end of concurrency with MD 77
Frederick	Thurmont	14.27	22.97	MD 806 north (Emmitsburg Road) – Emmitsburg	Southern terminus of MD 806; officially MD 806R
Frederick	Thurmont	14.71	23.67	US 15 (Catoctin Mountain Highway) – Frederick, Gettysburg	Diamond interchange
Washington	Fort Ritchie	23.84	38.37	MD 491 south (Macfee Hill Road) – Smithsburg	Northern terminus of MD 491; MD 550 turns north onto Macfee Hill Road
Washington	Fort Ritchie	24.23	38.99	Camp Ritchie Access Road north / Pennersville Road east	MD 550 turns west onto Pen Mar Road
Washington	Fort Ritchie	24.43	39.32	Pen Mar Road north – Pen Mar	Northern terminus
1.000 mi = 1.609 km; 1.000 km = 0.621 mi: Concurrency terminus
