= Foxville, Maryland =

Unincorporated community in Maryland, United States

- Unincorporated community
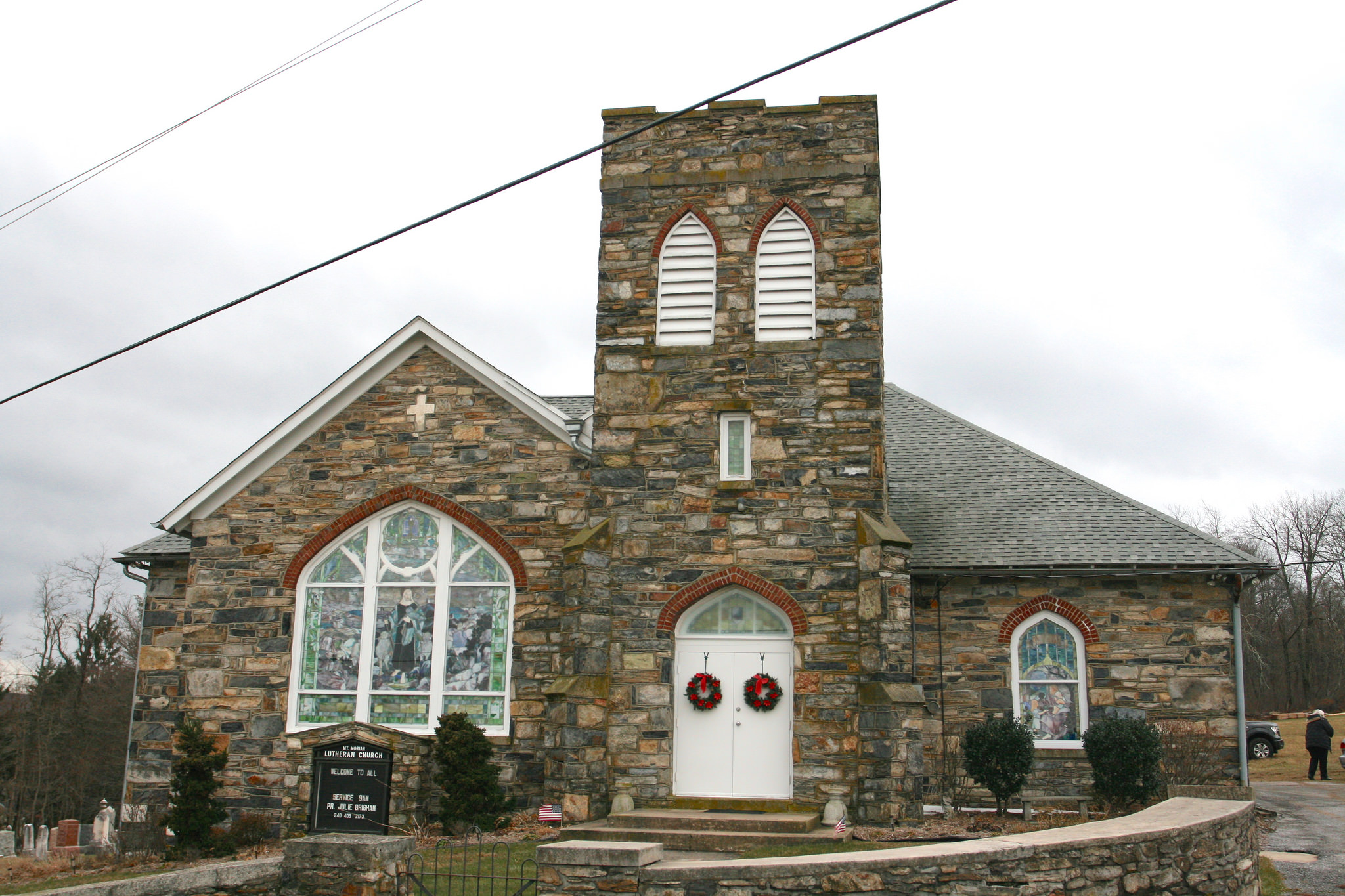
- The historic Mount Moriah Lutheran Church in Foxville, Maryland.

- Location within Maryland
- Coordinates: 39°38′11″N 77°29′49″W
- Country: United States
- State: Maryland
- County: Frederick
- Elevation: 1,453 ft (443 m)
- Time zone: UTC-5 (Eastern (EST))
  - Summer (DST): UTC-4 (EDT)
- Area codes: 301 & 240
- GNIS feature ID: 584480

Foxville is an unincorporated community in Frederick County, Maryland, United States. Foxville is located on Maryland Route 77, 4.7 miles (7.6 km) west of Thurmont. Settled in the late 18th century, the historic village is situated between South Mountain to the west and Catoctin Mountain to the east. Catoctin Mountain Park, Cunningham Falls State Park, and the Appalachian Trail are all within a few miles of Foxville.

== History ==
The Foxville schoolhouse

The former Wolfe's Tavern

The village of Foxville was settled in the late 18th century by second-generation German immigrants to the United States as they moved southward from their original settlements in Pennsylvania. Early settlers in Foxville included the Brown, Fox, Wolfe, Hauver, and Poorman (Buhrman) families. Foxville was situated on the main road leading between Hagerstown and Emmitsburg. The Wolfe family built a tavern along this route circa 1800. As the area became more permanently settled in the early 19th century, the developing village took the name of Foxville from the area's largest landowners, the Fox family. In 1830, Mount Moriah Lutheran Church was organized and erected a stone building on the northern edge of the village. A few years later, the Mount Bethel Methodist Episcopal Church was established in 1836 and constructed a log building approximately one mile south of the village. In the latter half of the 19th century, the village further developed with the establishment of a public school, wagon shop, and general store, operated by Thomas Fox, a third-generation descendant of the original settlers. In 1877, Mount Moriah Lutheran Church was largely rebuilt and Mount Bethel Methodist Episcopal Church erected a new building in 1902.

During the Great Depression, WPA workers constructed Camp Hi Catoctin on the mountain a few miles northwest of Foxville as a retreat for Federal Government employees and their families. In 1942, President Franklin D. Roosevelt converted the camp into a presidential retreat called Shangri-La. President Dwight D. Eisenhower renamed the retreat Camp David during his administration. The Eisenhowers donated a significant library of books to the Foxville School, where the children of some of the workers at Camp David attended. Closed in 1962, Foxville's school was the last two-room school in operation in Frederick County, Maryland.

Much of the historical architecture which survives today in Foxville is of vernacular design and employs local resources such as log and stone. Several notable structures in the village have been preserved. These include the Wolfe Tavern, a two-story log structure built around 1800 to serve as a stage stop along the main road leading from Hagerstown to Emmitsburg. Mount Moriah Lutheran Church, founded in 1830, occupies a stone structure originally built in 1877 and rebuilt in 1919 after a fire. In its rebuilt form, Mount Moriah Church displays Gothic Revival style. Mount Bethel United Methodist Church (originally Methodist Episcopal Church) occupies a frame structure built in 1902 and rebuilt with a brick veneer in the 1960s. The adjoining churchyard at Mount Bethel contains relocated graves of some of the earliest settlers of Foxville, including those of the Buhrman family.

== Climate ==
The climate in this area is characterized by hot, humid summers and generally mild to cool winters. According to the Köppen Climate Classification system, Foxville has a humid subtropical climate, abbreviated "Cfa" on climate maps.
