= Maryland Route 77 =

State highway in Maryland, US

Maryland Route 77
- Maryland Route 77 highlighted in red

Route information
- Maintained by MDSHA
- Length: 20.74 mi (33.38 km)
- Existed: 1927–present
- Tourist routes: Journey Through Hallowed Ground Byway; Old Main Streets Scenic Byway

Major junctions
- West end: MD 64 in Smithsburg
- US 15 in Thurmont; MD 550 in Thurmont; MD 76 in Rocky Ridge
- East end: MD 194 in Keymar

Location
- Country: United States
- State: Maryland
- Counties: Washington, Frederick, Carroll

Highway system
- Maryland highway system; Interstate; US; State; Scenic Byways
← MD 76	→ MD 79

Maryland Route 77 (MD 77) is a state highway in the U.S. state of Maryland. The state highway runs 20.74 miles (33.38 km) from MD 64 in Smithsburg east to MD 194 in Keymar. MD 77 is the main east–west highway of northern Frederick County. The state highway connects Thurmont with eastern Washington County via Foxville, which lies between South Mountain and Catoctin Mountain near Catoctin Mountain Park and Cunningham Falls State Park. MD 77 links Thurmont with western Carroll County through the communities of Graceham, Rocky Ridge, and Detour in the Monocacy River valley. MD 77 was constructed from Thurmont east to Detour in the 1920s and early 1930s. A disjoint section of MD 77 was built between Cavetown and Foxville in the late 1930s. The portions of the modern highway between Foxville and Thurmont and from Detour to Keymar were county highways until they were designated part of MD 77 in 1956. MD 77's western terminus was moved east to MD 64 in Smithsburg in 1960.

== Route description ==
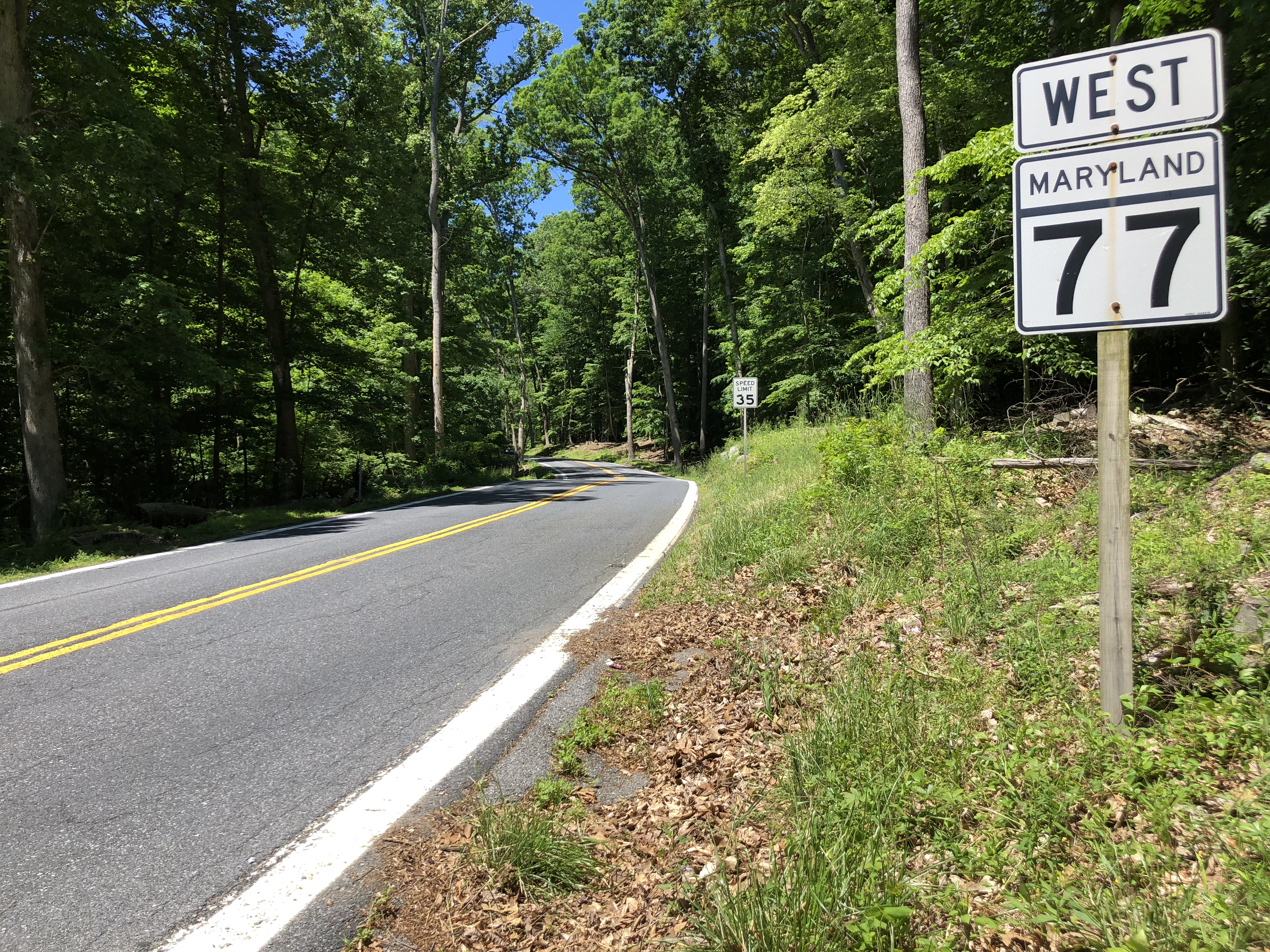
View west along MD 77 in Catoctin Mountain Park

MD 77 begins at an intersection with MD 64 (Smithsburg Pike) in Smithsburg. The roadway continues northwest as county-maintained Leitersburg Smithsburg Road into the town of Smithsburg, where it becomes that town's Main Street, then continues northwest to Leitersburg. MD 77's first intersection east of MD 64 is Wolfsville Road, which becomes MD 17 at the Washington–Frederick county line and heads into the Middletown Valley. MD 77 heads east as Foxville Road, a two-lane undivided road that passes through several sharp curves as the highway ascends South Mountain. The state highway passes Pleasant Valley Road before it reaches its highest point at the Washington–Frederick County line. East of Foxville, MD 77 begins to follows the boundary between Cunningham Falls State Park to the south and the National Park Service-managed Catoctin Mountain Park to the north. Catoctin Mountain Park contains three historic camps: Camp Greentop, Camp Misty Mount, and the Presidential retreat Camp David.

MD 77 follows a curvaceous route along the narrow valley of Hunting Creek to descend Catoctin Mountain. The state highway emerges from the mountain valley just west of the town of Thurmont, where the highway becomes Main Street and meets U.S. Route 15 (US 15, Catoctin Mountain Highway) at a partial cloverleaf interchange. MD 77 intersects Church Street and Water Street in the center of town; Church Street heads north as MD 550. The two state highways run concurrently through the eastern part of Thurmont until MD 550 heads south as Jimtown Road and MD 77 continues east as Rocky Ridge Road. MD 77 leaves the town of Thurmont and passes through the village of Graceham, where the highway passes northwest of Graceham Moravian Church and Parsonage and has a one-lane underpass of the Maryland Midland Railway. The state highway passes through farmland and traverses Owens Creek just west of Old Frederick Road, which crosses the creek to the south on the Loys Station Covered Bridge. Another historic bridge across Owens Creek, the Old Mill Road Bridge, is accessed by Old Mill Road just east of Loyds Station.

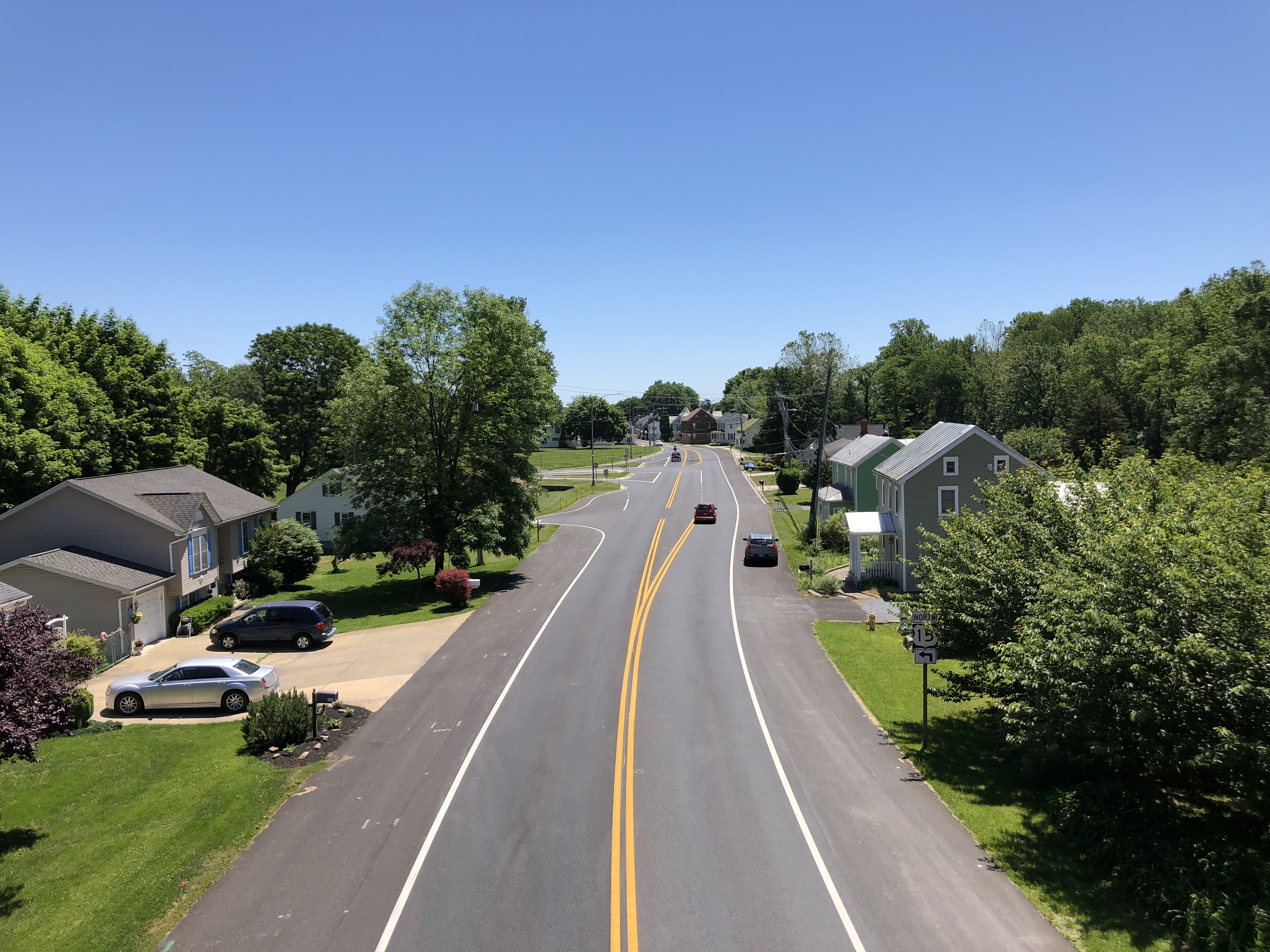
View east along MD 77 from US 15 in Thurmont

MD 77 passes under the railroad again just west of Rocky Ridge also passing over the Beaver Branch waterway (which feeds Owens Creek and thereafter feess the Monocacy River). The MD 77 bridge over the Beaver Branch was constructed in 1928 and renovated in 2025. The state highway crosses the Monocacy River on a through truss bridge at Millers Bridge just south of the confluence of the Monocacy River and Double Pipe Creek. A short distance to the east, MD 77 crosses Double Pipe Creek and enters Carroll County at the village of Detour, which is located just north of the confluence of Big Pipe Creek and Little Pipe Creek to form Double Pipe Creek. The state highway continues east as Middleburg Road, which intersects the Maryland Midland Railway at grade and crosses Big Pipe Creek before reaching its eastern terminus at MD 194 (Francis Scott Key Memorial Highway) in the village of Keymar, which sits at the junction of the Maryland Midland Railway's east–west and north–south rail lines. Middleburg Road continues east as a county highway that passes through Middleburg and Uniontown before continuing as Uniontown Road toward Westminster.

== History ==
The first section of what was to become MD 77 was paved in concrete from the railroad crossing at Graceham east to Old Frederick Road near Loys Station by 1923. This section of improved road was extended east with concrete to Rocky Ridge starting in 1924 and completed by 1927. MD 77 was also extended west to the eastern edge of Thurmont as a macadam road by 1927. The concrete highway was extended east 1 mile (1.6 km) from Rocky Ridge in 1928 and to the Monocacy River in 1930. MD 77 was extended east to the Frederick–Carroll county line at Double Pipe Creek just west of Detour starting in 1930. The state highway's truss bridge over the Monocacy River was built in 1932, replacing an old truss bridge of the same design as one that had catastrophically failed on US 240's (now MD 355) crossing of the Baltimore and Ohio Railroad in 1930.

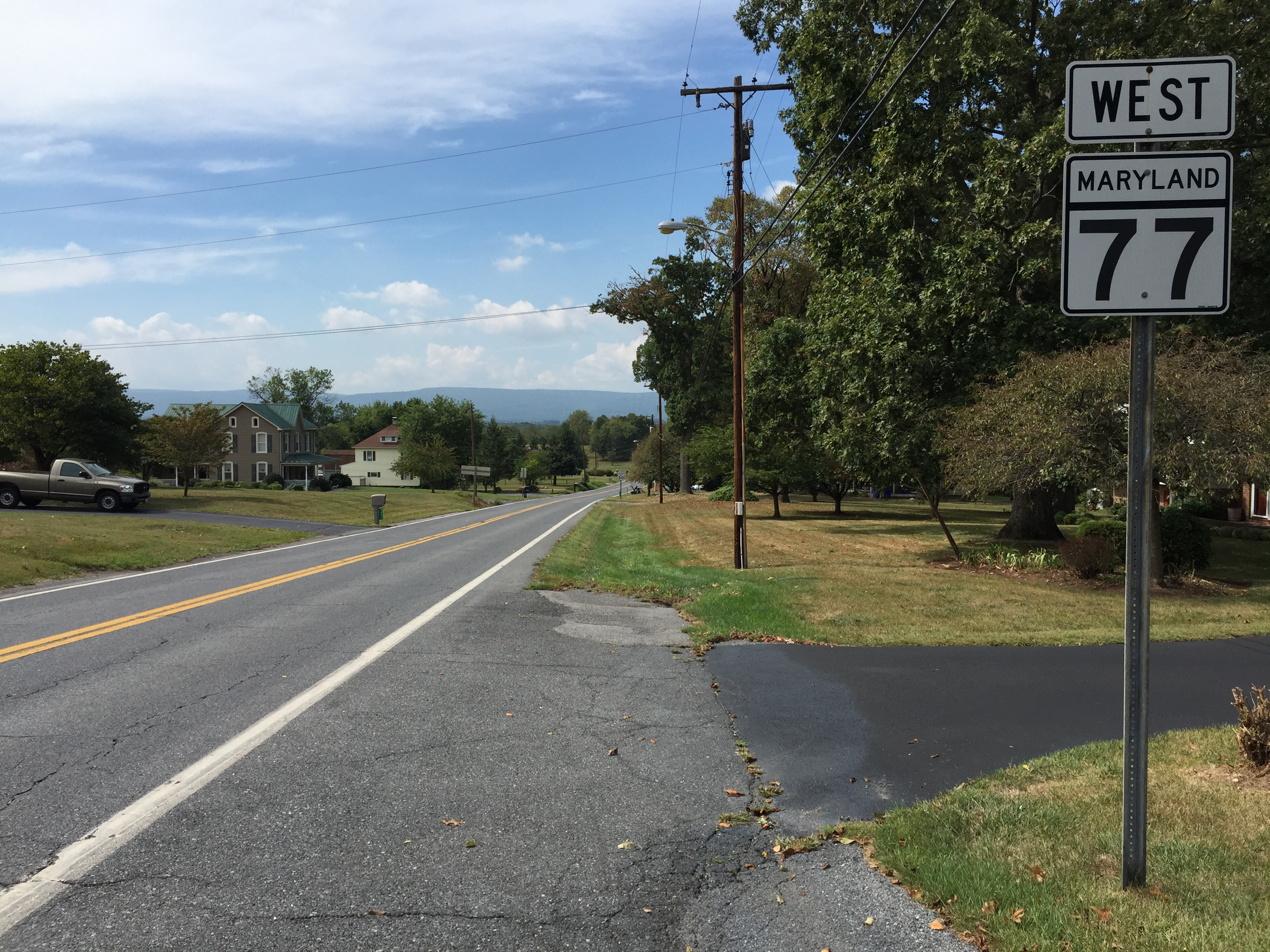
View west along MD 77 west of MD 76 in Rocky Ridge

MD 77 was connected to US 15 in Thurmont by municipally-maintained Main Street and from Detour to MD 71 (now MD 194) in Keymar by a county connecting road. The first portion of the western half of MD 77 was built between 1936 and 1938 from Cavetown to Foxville. The westernmost part of MD 77 included Cavetown Church Road from MD 64 (now MD 66) in Cavetown to just east of Wolfsville Road. The two sections of MD 77 were connected by county-maintained Foxville Road from Foxville to Thurmont. Foxville Road between Foxville and Thurmont and Middleburg Road from Double Pipe Creek east to MD 194 became part of MD 77 in 1956. MD 77 was widened through Thurmont that same year.

In 1956, construction began on MD 77's interchange with the US 15 bypass, which opened in 1958. The US 15 interchange originally consisted of one two-way ramp in the northeast quadrant of the junction between MD 77 and the two-lane bypass. When US 15 was expanded to a four-lane divided highway in 1985, the southbound US 15 ramps in the southwest quadrant of the junction were constructed. MD 77's western terminus was moved from Cavetown to the Smithsburg Bypass when MD 64 was moved to the new highway in 1960. The old alignment of MD 77 west to Cavetown consists of Cavetown Church Road, which is unsigned MD 844 between MD 64 and a dead end adjacent to modern MD 77 east of Wolfsville Road.

== Junction list ==
County	Location	mi	km	Destinations	Notes
Washington	Smithsburg	0.00	0.00	MD 64 (Smithsburg Pike) / Leitersburg Smithsburg Road west – Hagerstown, Waynesboro	Western terminus
Frederick	Thurmont	10.10	16.25	US 15 (Catoctin Mountain Highway) – Frederick, Gettysburg	Partial cloverleaf interchange
Frederick	Thurmont	10.47	16.85	MD 550 north (Church Street) / Water Street south – Sabillasville	West end of concurrency with MD 550
Frederick	Thurmont	11.46	18.44	MD 550 south (Jimtown Road) – Creagerstown, Woodsboro	East end of concurrency with MD 550
Frederick	Rocky Ridge	15.99	25.73	MD 76 north (Motters Station Road) / Longs Mill Road south – Emmitsburg	Southern terminus of MD 76
Carroll	Keymar	20.74	33.38	MD 194 (Francis Scott Key Highway) / Middleburg Road east – Taneytown, Woodsboro, Middleburg	Eastern terminus
1.000 mi = 1.609 km; 1.000 km = 0.621 mi: Concurrency terminus
