= Maryland Route 76 =

State highway in Frederick County, Maryland, US, known as Motters Station Rd

Maryland Route 76
- Motters Station Road
- Maryland Route 76 highlighted in red

Route information
- Maintained by MDSHA
- Length: 5.69 mi (9.16 km)
- Existed: 1927–present

Major junctions
- South end: MD 77 near Rocky Ridge
- North end: US 15 near Emmitsburg

Location
- Country: United States
- State: Maryland
- Counties: Frederick

Highway system
- Maryland highway system; Interstate; US; State; Scenic Byways
← MD 75	→ MD 77

Maryland Route 76 (MD 76) is a state highway in the U.S. state of Maryland. Known as Motters Station Road, the state highway runs 5.69 miles (9.16 km) from MD 77 in Rocky Ridge north to U.S. Route 15 (US 15) near Emmitsburg in northern Frederick County. MD 76 was constructed in two sections in the early 1920s and late 1930s.

== Route description ==
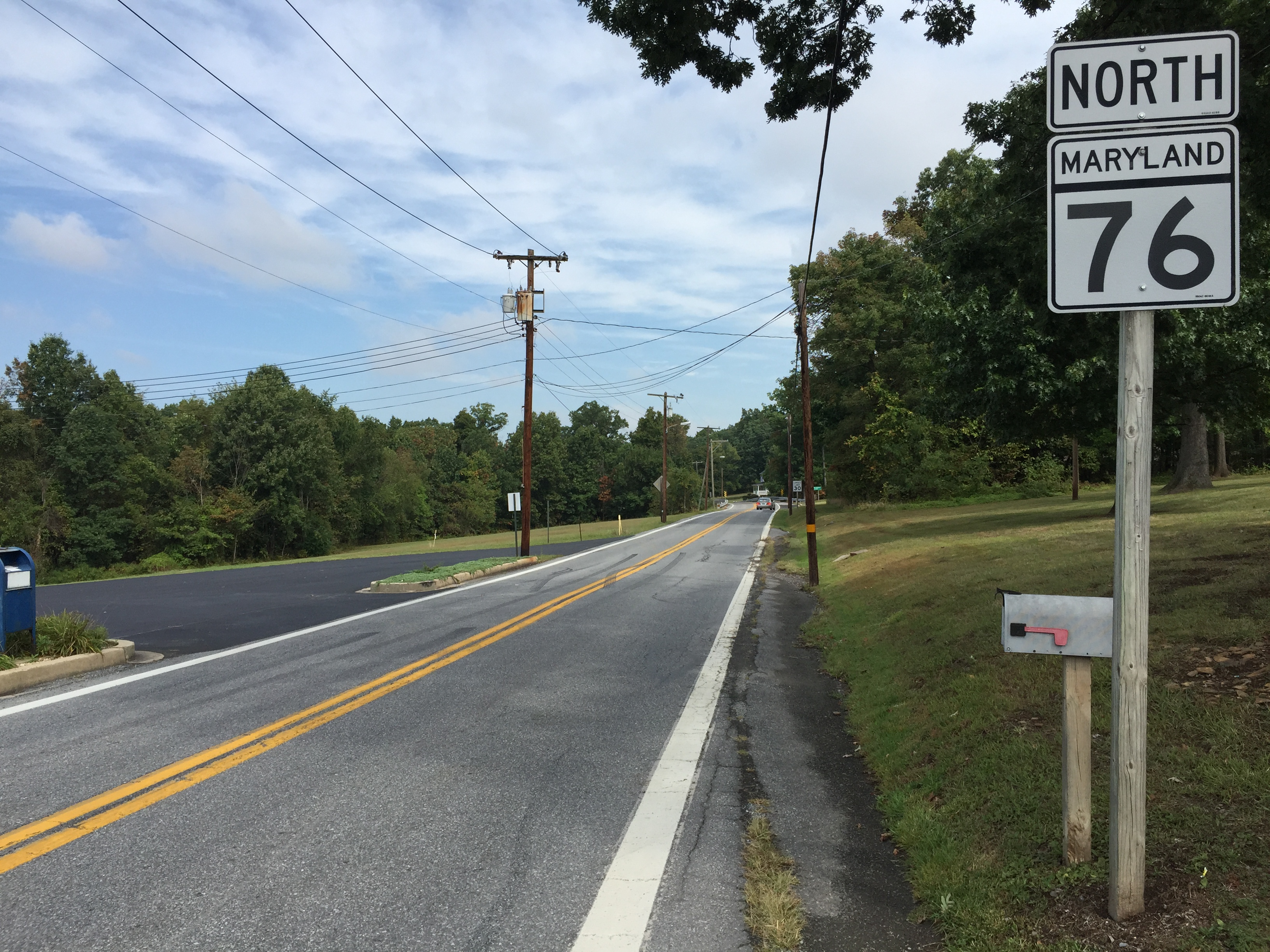
View north along MD 76 north of MD 77 in Rocky Ridge

MD 76 begins at an intersection with MD 77 (Rocky Ridge Road) in the village of Rocky Ridge. The roadway continues south as county-maintained Longs Mill Road. The state highway heads north as a two-lane undivided road that passes over the Maryland Midland Railway and parallels the Monocacy River from a distance. In the hamlet of Motters, MD 76 intersects Four Point Roads, which leads east to the historic Fourpoints Bridge over Toms Creek, and makes a turn to the west. The state highway intersects Old Frederick Road and curves to the northwest before reaching its northern terminus at US 15 (Catoctin Mountain Highway) south of Emmitsburg. The roadway continues west as county-maintained Motters Station Road to St. Anthony Road, the old alignment of US 15 that leads to Mount St. Mary's University and the National Shrine Grotto of Our Lady of Lourdes.

== History ==
The first section of MD 76 was completed by 1921 as a concrete road from US 15 to Motters, a station on the Emmitsburg branch of the Western Maryland Railway. The highway between Rocky Ridge and Motters was completed in 1938. Aside from minor improvements, MD 76 has not changed since.

== Junction list ==
The entire route is in Frederick County.

Location	mi	km	Destinations	Notes
Rocky Ridge	0.00	0.00	MD 77 (Rocky Ridge Road) / Longs Mill Road south – Thurmont, Taneytown	Southern terminus
Emmitsburg	5.69	9.16	US 15 (Catoctin Mountain Highway) / Motters Station Road north – Frederick, Gettysburg	Northern terminus
1.000 mi = 1.609 km; 1.000 km = 0.621 mi
