= Catoctin Wildlife Preserve and Zoo =

Catoctin Wildlife Preserve
- Interactive map of Catoctin Wildlife Preserve
- 39.590642°N 77.430739°W
- Date opened: 1966
- Location: Thurmont, Maryland, United States
- Land area: 100 acres (40 ha)
- No. of animals: 450+
- Website: catoctinwildlifepreserve.com

The Catoctin Wildlife Preserve is a 100-acre (40 ha) zoo and wildlife preserve (25 acres (10 ha) are accessible to the public) located on Maryland Route 806 in Thurmont, Maryland, United States.

The preserve features safari truck rides that let visitors touch and feed large herbivores in a wooded setting.

== History ==
Animals have been exhibited at this location since 1933, when it was known as Jungleland Snake Farm. Owner Gordon Gaver operated the small attraction (approx. 5 acres) until his death in 1964. The facility was then purchased by Richard and Mary Anne Hahn and reopened in 1966. The Hahn family maintained ownership and gradually enlarged the park. In August 2012, the zoo was fined by the United States Department of Agriculture's Animal and Plant Health Inspection Service $12,000 for numerous violations. In 2013, a giraffe died while on exhibit at the zoo. Worker safety and animal care issues at the zoo have been raised for a number of years.

== Animals ==
=== Islands area ===
- Linnaeus's two-toed sloth
- Eastern box turtle
- Asian small-clawed otter
- Olive baboon
- Blue-and-yellow macaw
- Hyacinth macaw
- Red-and-green macaw
- Scarlet macaw
- Military macaw
- Great horned owl
- Pied crow
- Booted macaque
- Sun bear

=== Madagascar area ===
- Black-and-white ruffed lemur
- Fossa
- Greater vasa parrot

=== Australia area ===
- Red kangaroo
- Red-necked wallaby
- Emu
- Double-wattled cassowary
- Dingo
- Black swan
- Magpie goose
- Cape Barren goose
- Budgerigar
- Laughing kookaburra
- Sulphur-crested cockatoo
- Blue-tongued skink

=== Safari ride ===
- American bison
- Emu
- European fallow deer
- Dromedary camel
- Mouflon
- Greater kudu
- Scimitar oryx
- Miniature donkey
- Greater rhea
- Grant's zebra
- Common ostrich
- Ankole-Watusi

=== Eurasia area ===
- Amur leopard
- Meerkat
- Green anaconda
- Reticulated python
- Yellow anaconda
- Argentine boa
- Abdim's stork
- African sacred ibis
- African spurred tortoise
- Red-crowned crane
- Goldfish
- Koi
- African pygmy goat
- Suri alpaca
- Jacob sheep

=== Latin America area ===
- Jaguar
- Patagonian mara
- Green iguana
- Galapagos tortoise
- Capybara
- Crested screamer

=== Africa area ===
- Nigerian Dwarf goat
- Aoudad
- Common patas monkey
- African spurred tortoise
- Leopard tortoise
- Binturong
- Visayan warty pig
- Indian peafowl
- Wild turkey

=== North America area ===
- American alligator
- Marabou stork
- Barred owl
- Collared peccary
- Arctic wolf
- Eurasian lynx
- Egyptian fruit bat
- Seba's short-tailed bat
