= Fort Ritchie, Maryland =

- CDP
- Coordinates: 39°42′16″N 77°29′55″W
- Country: United States
- State: Maryland
- County: Washington

Area
  - Total: 1.01 sq mi (2.61 km^{2})
  - Land: 0.97 sq mi (2.52 km^{2})
  - Water: 0.035 sq mi (0.09 km^{2})
- Elevation: 1,398 ft (426 m)

Population (2020)
  - Total: 12
  - Density: 12.3/sq mi (4.76/km^{2})
- Time zone: UTC−5 (Eastern (EST))
  - Summer (DST): UTC−4 (EDT)
- ZIP code: 21719
- Area codes: 301, 240
- FIPS code: 24-29450
- GNIS feature ID: 2389111

Fort Ritchie is a census-designated place (CDP) in Washington County, Maryland, United States, just south of the Pennsylvania state line. The population was 276 at the 2000 census. Fort Ritchie is a former U.S. military base that closed in September 1998, pursuant to the 1995 Base Realignment and Closure Commission. Blue Ridge Summit, Pennsylvania is immediately to the north.

== History ==
Fort Ritchie was originally established as a training site for the Maryland National Guard. It was acquired as a US Army installation during World War II. During the war it was used as a training site for interrogators and psychological warfare experts, known as the Ritchie Boys. After the war, it was used as a communications center by the Army supporting the Military District of Washington and by the Air Force in support of the nearby Raven Rock Mountain Complex Alternate National Military Command Center (ANMCC). The post was closed in September 1998.

Since then there has been no comprehensive redevelopment plan for the facility. The last residents of former military housing on the site were evicted in June 2017. As of April 2021, the Washington County Board of Commissioners negotiated a sale to private investor John Krumpotich. As of July, 2021, Krumpotich is actively working on the rehabilitation of the existing buildings on the former post, and have found great success in restoring former military housing.

== Geography ==
According to the United States Census Bureau, the CDP has a total area of 1.0 square mile (2.6 km^{2}), of which 1.0 square mile (2.6 km^{2}) is land and 0.04 square miles (0.10 km^{2}) (3.00%) is water.

The geography of Ritchie, and more broadly Cascade, Maryland played an extensive role in the settlement of the area. The elevation of nearly 1,400 ft in a "high valley" surrounded by elevations surpassing 2,000 ft at Fort Ritchie allowed for the Buena Vista Ice Company to successfully create and sell naturally cut ice to larger cities such as Baltimore and Washington, D.C. in the late 1800s until 1903. Buena Vista was the southernmost ice company in the United States. It was the original infrastructure of Buena Vista which ultimately influenced the Maryland National Guard to approve the site for its use.

Many bordering communities, such as Smithsburg, MD and Waynesboro, PA only boast elevations between 700 and 800 ft in juxtaposition of Quirauk Mountain where its highest elevation caps a 2,145 ft and is the highest point of South Mountain. As a result of this elevation, Cascade Elementary students have their own inclement weather zone which allows for either a delay, early dismissal, or day off of school depending upon the severity of winter weather whereas other Washington County Public School students may not have delays or cancellations. It is not uncommon for the Cascade area and Fort Ritchie to receive twice as much snow as other nearby communities. It is also notorious for ice storms which can make travel exceedingly dangerous during winter storms. Fort Ritchie averages 40" of snowfall annually.

== Demographics ==
Historical population
Census	Pop.	Note	%±
2020	12		—
U.S. Decennial Census

As of the census of 2000, there were 276 people, 83 households, and 73 families residing in the CDP. The population density was 281.8 inhabitants per square mile (108.8/km^{2}). There were 335 housing units at an average density of 342.1 per square mile (132.1/km^{2}). The racial makeup of the CDP was 67.39% White, 17.75% African American, 1.45% Native American, 1.81% Asian, 4.71% from other races, and 6.88% from two or more races. Hispanic or Latino of any race were 6.16% of the population.

There were 83 households, out of which 75.9% had children under the age of 18 living with them, 65.1% were married couples living together, 18.1% had a female householder with no husband present, and 12.0% were non-families. 4.8% of all households were made up of individuals, and none had someone living alone who was 65 years of age or older. The average household size was 3.33 and the average family size was 3.42.

In the CDP, the population was spread out, with 42.4% under the age of 18, 12.7% from 18 to 24, 41.3% from 25 to 44, 3.6% from 45 to 64, . The median age was 24 years. For every 100 females, there were 107.5 males. For every 100 females age 18 and over, there were 106.5 males.

The median income for a household in the CDP was $30,625, and the median income for a family was $29,375. Males had a median income of $27,656 versus $16,250 for females. The per capita income for the CDP was $10,549. None of the population or families were below the poverty line.
