= Catoctin Furnace, Maryland =

Unincorporated community in Maryland, U.S.

Coordinates: 39°34′45″N 77°25′57″W

Catoctin Furnace is an unincorporated community located on Route 15 between Frederick and Thurmont in the northern part of Frederick County, Maryland, United States. It is the site of the Catoctin Furnace Historic District.

== History ==
Catoctin Furnace (also known as Catoctin Iron Furnace) was constructed in 1774 by four brothers Thomas, Baker, Roger and James Johnson to produce pig iron from locally mined hematite. The village of Catoctin Furnace grew in the land around the iron furnace. Furnace workers lived in company-owned stone and log houses. During its most prosperous time, the village of Catoctin Furnace boasted three furnaces, a sawmill, a gristmill, a school, and eighty houses for workers all situated on 11,350 acres.

By 1903, operating a small iron furnace complex was nearly impossible due to technological advances as well as environmental restraints, and the furnace was shut down. After the furnace went out of business, many people from the community were forced to seek employment outside the tiny village. In 1923, the property again changed hands, and the families residing in the formerly company-owned houses were given the opportunity to purchase their own homes.
