= Rocky Ridge, Maryland =

Unincorporated community in Maryland, United States

- Unincorporated community
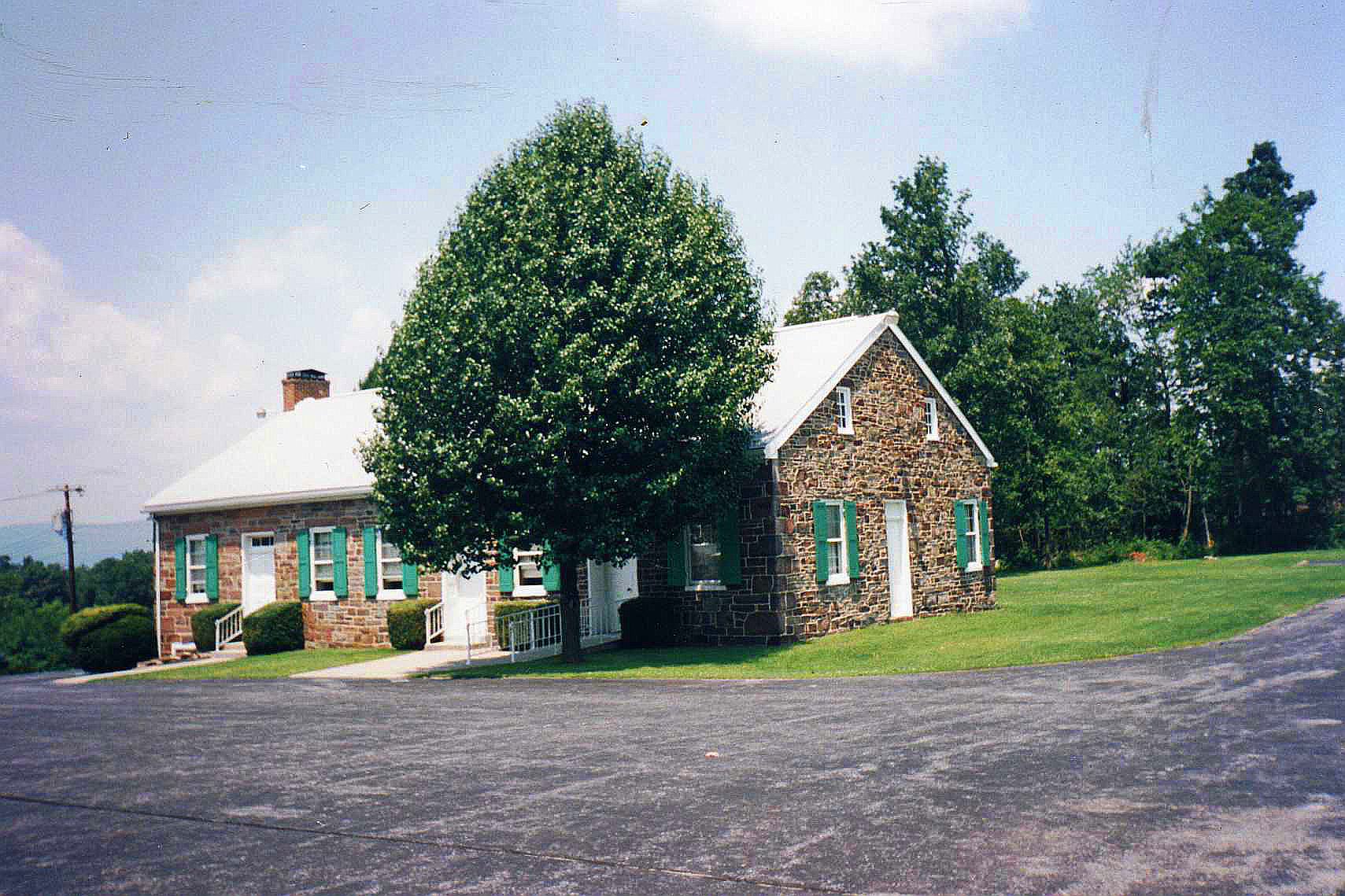
- The Monocacy Church of the Brethren in July 1996

- Location in Maryland Rocky; Ridge (the United States)
- Coordinates: 39°36′18″N 77°19′03″W
- Country: United States of America
- State: Maryland
- County: Frederick
- Elevation: 443 ft (135 m)
- GNIS feature ID: 591170

Rocky Ridge is an unincorporated community in Frederick County, Maryland, United States. The name "Rocky Ridge" likely refers to a ridge of ironstone which runs through the area.

== History ==
The Rocky Ridge area was settled by several families by the mid-18th century, at which time it was known as Ogleton, after the Ogle family. It has spent most of its life as a "crossroads village," being centered on the intersection of the roads that today are Maryland Route 76 and Maryland Route 77. It was a railroad depot in the latter half of the 19th century; the Western Maryland Railway reached Rocky Ridge in 1870, and the Emmitsburg Railroad connected with it there in 1875. Highlighting the importance of the railroads in its existence, the Rocky Ridge stretch of Maryland Route 76 is known as Motters Station Road after Joshua Motter, president of the Emmitsburg Railroad.

Rocky Ridge had two active church congregations by the mid-19th century, and got its own post office in 1870.

Old Mill Road Bridge was listed on the National Register of Historic Places in 1979. Loys Station Covered Bridge, located between Rocky Ridge and Thurmont, was listed in 1978.

== Tourism ==
The town is known for the "Big Slide," a forty-foot tall wooden slide, built by volunteers in 1950. The slide is located in Mount Tabor Park, a park founded by Mount Tabor Church in the early 20th century and still administered by the church today. The park is said to have been used for religious revivals.
