= Lewistown, Maryland =

Unincorporated community in Maryland, United States

Lewistown
- Census-designated place
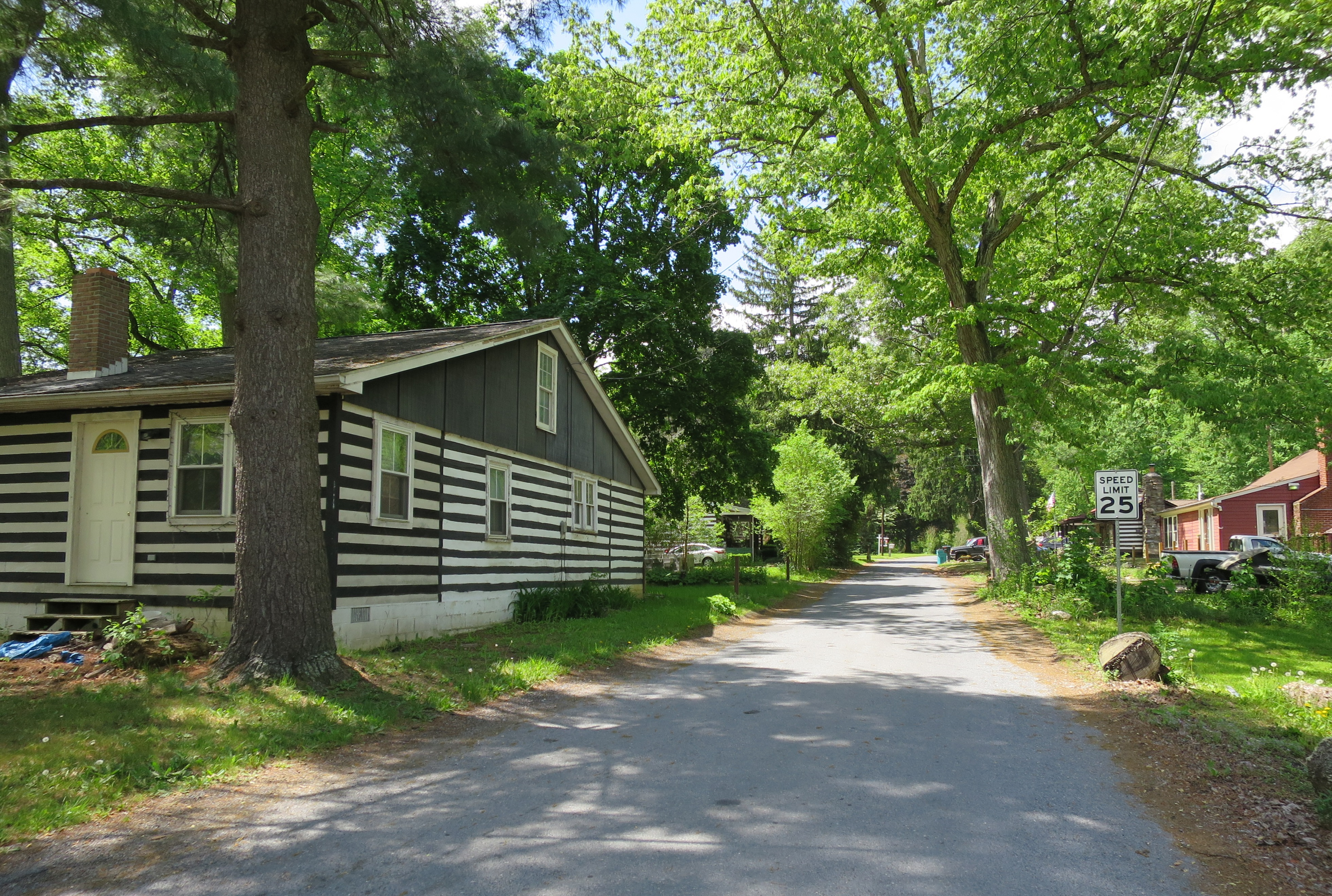
- House in Lewistown

- Location within the state of Maryland Lewistown (the United States)
- Coordinates: 39°22′37″N 77°25′09″W
- Country: United States of America
- State: Maryland
- County: Frederick

Area
  - Total: 0.65 sq mi (1.68 km^{2})
  - Land: 0.64 sq mi (1.66 km^{2})
  - Water: 0.0077 sq mi (0.02 km^{2})
- Elevation: 427 ft (130 m)

Population (2020)
  - Total: 458
  - Density: 715.9/sq mi (276.41/km^{2})
- Time zone: UTC-5 (Eastern (EST))
  - Summer (DST): UTC-4 (EDT)
- FIPS code: 24-46650
- GNIS feature ID: 2806299

Lewistown is a census designated place and unincorporated community in Frederick County, Maryland, United States. Lewistown Elementary school, part of Frederick County Public Schools, is located in Lewistown. The town, founded in 1841, has had a school since the 19th century. There is a large elderly population in the community. It first appeared as a CDP in the 2020 Census with a population of 458.

== History ==
The Lewistown Volunteer Fire Company was established in 1970, when the community purchased the first diesel engine in the county. Today, the fire department has six different apparatus: Engine Tanker 224, Engine 221, Tanker 22, Brush 226, Utility 22 and Ambulance 229. The fire station is staffed by volunteers from the community and two paid employees of the county.

On June 23, 1863, General John F. Reynolds' I Corps marched through Lewistown on their way to Gettysburg in pursuit of the Confederate army.

The Hagerstown and Frederick Railway served Lewistown.

== Demographics ==
Historical population
Census	Pop.	Note	%±
2020	458		—
U.S. Decennial Census; 2020

Lewistown first appeared as a census designated place in the 2020 U.S. census.

=== 2020 census ===
Lewistown CDP, Maryland - Demographic Profile (NH = Non-Hispanic)
Race / Ethnicity	Pop 2020	% 2020
White alone (NH)	396	86.46%
Black or African American alone (NH)	11	2.40%
Native American or Alaska Native alone (NH)	0	0.00%
Asian alone (NH)	2	0.44%
Pacific Islander alone (NH)	1	0.22%
Some Other Race alone (NH)	0	0.00%
Mixed Race/Multi-Racial (NH)	15	3.28%
Hispanic or Latino (any race)	33	7.21%
Total	458	100.00%

Note: the US Census treats Hispanic/Latino as an ethnic category. This table excludes Latinos from the racial categories and assigns them to a separate category. Hispanics/Latinos can be of any race.

== Education ==
It is in Frederick County Public Schools.

School zoning is as follows: It is zoned to Lewistown Elementary School, Thurmont Middle School, and Catoctin High School.
