= Cunningham Falls State Park =

State park in Maryland, United States

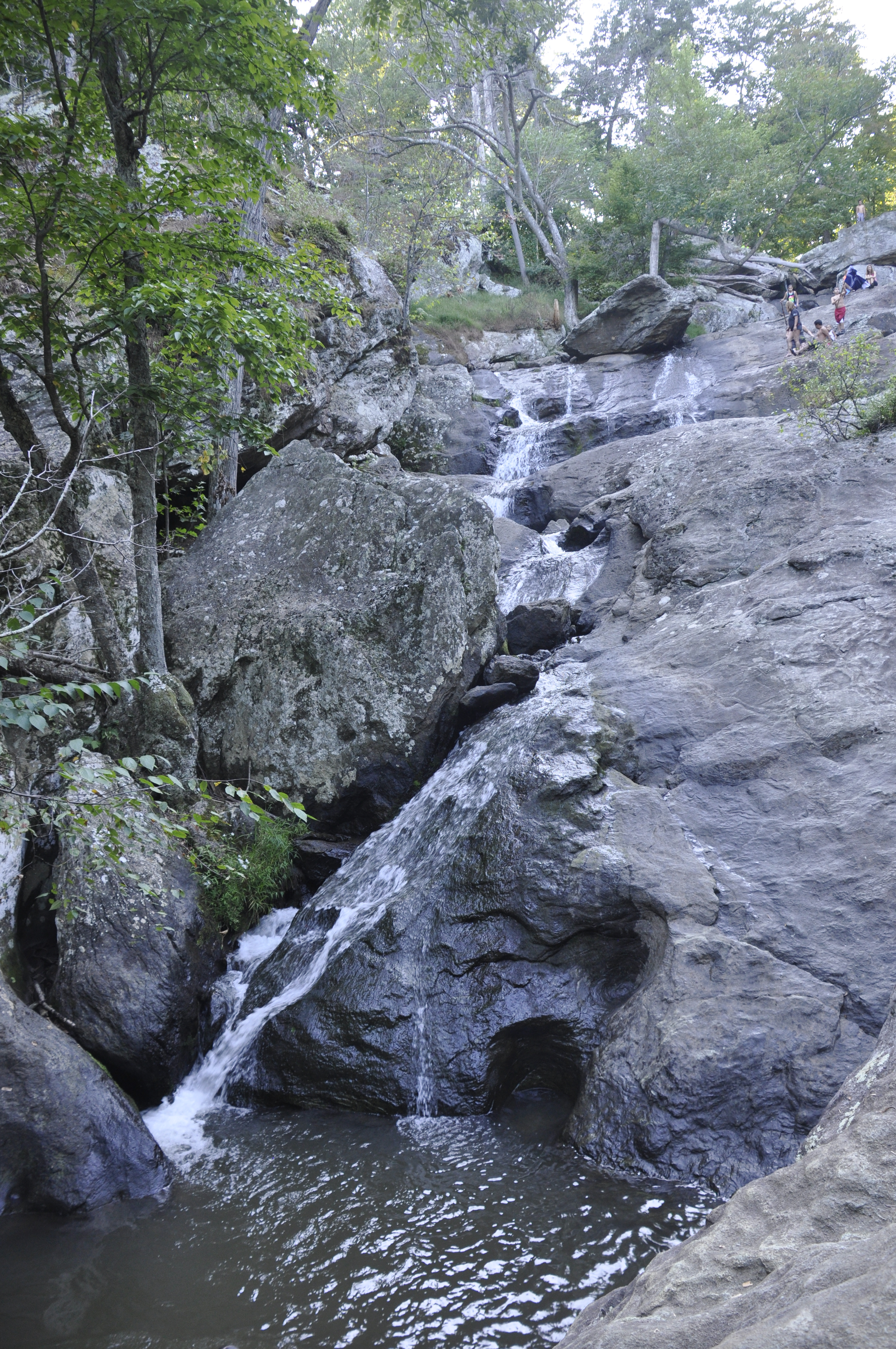
- The longest cascading waterfall in Maryland

- Location within Maryland
- Location: Frederick County, Maryland, United States
- Nearest town: Thurmont, Maryland
- Coordinates: 39°37′53″N 77°28′16″W
- Area: 6,157 acres (2,492 ha)
- Elevation: 1,273 ft (388 m)
- Established: 1954
- Administrator: Maryland Department of Natural Resources
- Designation: Maryland state park
- Website: Official website

Cunningham Falls State Park is a Maryland state park located west of Thurmont, Maryland, in the United States. The state park is the home of Cunningham Falls, the largest cascading waterfall in Maryland, a 43-acre (17 ha) man-made lake, and the remains of a historic iron furnace. The park is one of several protected areas occupying 50-mile-long Catoctin Mountain; it is bordered on its north by Catoctin Mountain Park and on its south by Frederick Municipal Forest.

== History ==
Before the arrival of European settlers, Native Americans used the Catoctin Mountain area for hunting and fishing and also quarried it for rhyolite to make projectile points. During the 19th century, settlers began cutting the area's forests for charcoal to power the Catoctin Iron Furnace. "Charcoal flats"—square areas measuring approximately 25 by 25 feet (7.6 by 7.6 m), cut flat into the hillsides and linked by mule trails—were used to build charcoal kilns. The charcoal flats can still be seen in the park.

Over two hundred years of abuse of the forest led to the destruction of the land. In the 1930s, after years of clearcutting for the making of charcoal, mountain farming, and timber harvesting, the land was purchased by the Federal government. Beginning in 1935, workers with the Works Progress Administration and the Civilian Conservation Corps began constructing the Catoctin Recreational Demonstration Area to transform the area for recreational use. The site's northern portion was transferred to the National Park Service on November 14, 1936, and renamed and reorganized on July 12, 1954, as Catoctin Mountain Park. The southern 5,000 acres (2,000 ha) were transferred to Maryland as Cunningham Falls State Park.

== Features ==
View from the top of Cunningham Falls

Known locally as McAfee Falls, after a family of early settlers, 78-foot (24 m) Cunningham Falls was apparently named after a photographer from Pen Mar Park who frequently photographed the falls.

An old homestead can be seen above the falls. There is an abandoned iron mine located in the park in addition to the ruins of the third Catoctin iron furnace, owned and constructed by Jacob Kinkel, in the 1850s-1860s.

== Activities and amenities ==
Recreational activities include hiking, hunting, swimming, boating, fishing, and camping. Big Hunting Creek, one of Maryland's premier trout streams, flows through the park.

Campgrounds are featured in the park's William Houck Area and Manor Area, with the former including numerous campsites, a camp store, and a handful of mini cabins, while the latter includes 31 campsites. Camp hosts are volunteers through the Maryland Park Service.

== See also ==
- List of waterfalls
