= Maryland Midland Railway =

Class III railroad in Maryland

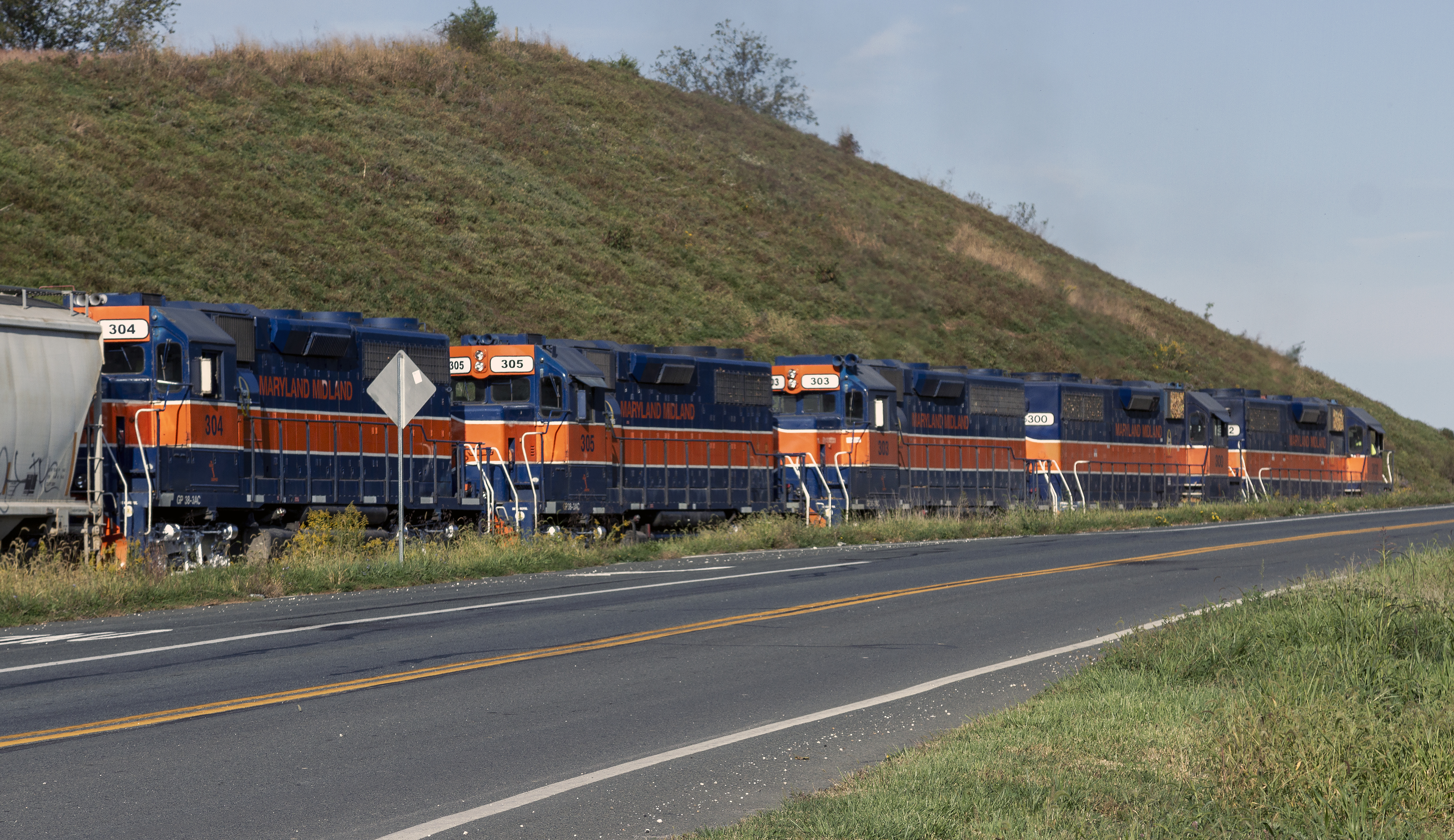
- Five Maryland Midland locomotives in 2013

Overview
- Headquarters: Union Bridge, Maryland
- Reporting mark: MMID
- Locale: Carroll and Frederick and Baltimore County Counties, Maryland
- Dates of operation: 1980–

Technical
- Track gauge: 4 ft 8 1/2 in (1,435 mm) standard gauge
- Length: 63 mi. (currently in service), 74 mi. total

The Maryland Midland Railway (reporting mark MMID) is a Class III short-line railroad operating approximately 63 miles of track in central Maryland. It was originally headquartered in the former Western Maryland Railway station in Union Bridge, Maryland: it has since moved to a new facility across from the old station. The railroad has been 100% owned by Genesee & Wyoming since 2008

The railway currently operates from Highfield, Maryland (west) to Glyndon, Maryland (east), via a two-mile loop through Franklin County, Pennsylvania, and also from Woodsboro, Maryland (south) to Taneytown, Maryland (north). The line terminates north of propane dealer Ferrellgas near Angell Road.

== History ==
Operations began in 1980 over a section of ex-Pennsylvania Railroad's Frederick Secondary line from Taneytown to Walkersville, Maryland. Starting in 1983 the ex-Western Maryland Railway line from Emory Grove to Highfield was purchased from Chessie System.

In late 1993, the company proposed a plan to rejuvenate the section of the Frederick Secondary from Taneytown to York, Pennsylvania that had been abandoned for the past ten years. The plan would have enabled the company to expand its markets to Pennsylvania and would have provided a connection to Conrail's rail network. The plan proved to be too costly because landowners along the proposed route of rail reconstruction demanded excessive prices; construction never began.

The railroad's business grew from trains pulling 200 freight cars per year in the 1980s to 18,000 freight cars in 2006. By 2006, it owned a fleet of ten locomotives; three GP9 low hoods, and seven GP38-3, all of EMD build. Its rolling stock also included 410 freight cars owned or leased.

In 2008, the railroad was purchased by Genesee & Wyoming, a US-based corporation that owns multiple railroad shortlines in the United States and Australia. As of 2023, G&W holds 81 miles of the Maryland & Midland Railway, and is 286,000 pound railcar compatible.

=== Passenger excursion line ===
Gus Novotny Associates, Inc. began a passenger excursion service known as the EnterTRAINment Line on the Maryland Midland Railway system in 1989. The EnterTRAINment Line (EL) paid a "haulage fee" to the railway each time the EL operated a train. The Maryland Midland Railway provided engines and train crew for the EL excursions, while the onboard staff (such as kitchen crew, servers, bartenders, train manager, and faux conductor) were EL employees.

The original schedule on the EnterTRAINment Line included all-you-can-eat dinner trains, murder mystery themed dinner trains, and carnival trains for children. An ownership group consisting of Kirk Lorenz, Steve Hamilton, Don Golec, and Jerry Pilcher purchased the EL from Gus Novotny & Associates in about 1992, according to Pilcher. The new owners added specialty theme trains, such as Civil War trains, political whistle stop trains, Santa Claus tree cutting trains, wedding trains, and NYE trains.

The new ownership also increased the capacity of the EnterTRAINment Line as well as the frequency and dates of departures. Group tour business was solicited, and marketing efforts expanded to include AAA, tour operators, and other nationally known travel partners. Dinner and Murder Mystery trains were operated between Westminster, MD and Union Bridge, MD and between Union Bridge, MD and Thurmont, MD. Specialty trains operated between Union Bridge, MD and the road's interchange with CSX at Blue Ridge Summit, in Pennsylvania.

A typical dinner or murder mystery train consist included:

1. Power car to provide electricity to the train, and storage space
2. Dining cars, which consisted of old coach cars, with the coach seats removed and tables installed
3. Dance car (no seats or tables), with oversized windows that opened all the way to the roof, and a live DJ
4. Dome car, a traditional center-dome car, formerly Union Pacific dome-diner 8008, later Auto Train 807 (went to Copper Canyon excursion service in Mexico after the EL closed)
5. "Kitchen Car", two different types were operated, at first only a former "Lunch Counter Car" with a minute kitchen was used. It was later supplemented with a full dining car, complete with full kitchen.
6. Private Car. A couple of private cars were available for a premium price. Guests were offered private dining, and had the exclusive use of the car, its bedrooms, and open platform, as well as the rest of the EnterTRAINment Line train.
7. "Hooper Car". The Edward G. Hooper, leased from a passenger car preservation group, was a former Baltimore & Ohio parlor car, and had the distinction of being named for a former president of the National Railway Historical Society. It also had its own bar and bathroom facilities.

In less than two years, business on the EnterTRAINment Line quadrupled. Because the EL was offering Murder Mystery trains, the State claimed that the EL must collect and remit a 10% Admissions and Amusement tax to the State. The former owners had never collected this tax, and had indicated to the new owners that it was not needed.

The EnterTRAINment Line's argument was that as a passenger railroad, the operation was not subject to local or state taxes and not under the enforcement or jurisdiction of the state. Instead, they argued, it fell under the jurisdiction of the Interstate Commerce Commission. The EnterTRAINment Line published a timetable with fares, with one way or round trip tickets available to the general public on any train operated by the EL, and it ran over a line that was part of the ICC-defined "national system".

The State sought back A&A taxes of approximately $300,000. Pilcher left the company in about 1994, alleging that his partners had chosen to fight the State's allegations without advice of counsel. The case was eventually decided in favor of the State, and the EnterTRAINment line soon stopped running. Much of the equipment had been leased, and was returned to its lessors. Other equipment was sold to other tourist railroads, and for a short while, some remnants of a dinner train operated out of the York, PA area. EnterTRAINment went out of business in May 1995.

Since then, Maryland Midland has been a freight-only line, except for occasional trips by stockholders and the Western Maryland Railway Historical Society Museum which is located in an adjoining building in Union Bridge.

== Interchanges ==
Maryland Midland Railway connects with CSX Transportation (CSXT) at two points:

- Highfield, Maryland
- Emory Grove, Maryland
