= Maryland Route 140 =

State highway in Maryland, US

Maryland Route 140
- Maryland Route 140 highlighted in red

Route information
- Maintained by MDSHA and Baltimore DOT
- Length: 49.73 mi (80.03 km)
- Existed: 1979–present
- Tourist routes: Old Main Streets Scenic Byway; Mason and Dixon Scenic Byway

Major junctions
- South end: US 1 / US 40 Truck in Baltimore
- MD 26 in Baltimore; I-695 in Pikesville; MD 30 in Reisterstown; I-795 in Reisterstown; MD 91 in Finksburg; MD 97 in Westminster; MD 27 in Westminster; MD 31 in Westminster; MD 194 in Taneytown; US 15 in Emmitsburg
- West end: PA 16 near Emmitsburg

Location
- Country: United States
- State: Maryland
- Counties: City of Baltimore, Baltimore, Carroll, Frederick

Highway system
- Maryland highway system; Interstate; US; State; Scenic Byways
← MD 139	→ MD 144

Maryland Route 140 (MD 140) is a 49-mile (79 km) state highway in the U.S. state of Maryland. The route runs from U.S. Route 1 (US 1) and US 40 Truck in Baltimore northwest to the Pennsylvania border, where the road continues into that state as Pennsylvania Route 16 (PA 16). MD 140 passes through the northern part of central Maryland, connecting Baltimore, Pikesville, Reisterstown, Westminster, Taneytown, and Emmitsburg.

== Route description ==
MD 140 is a part of the main National Highway System from I-795 in Reisterstown to US 15 in Emmitsburg. The highway has two segments where it serves as an intermodal connector: from Patterson Avenue in Baltimore to I-695 in Pikesville and from Painters Mill Road to Owings Mill Boulevard in Owings Mills. The remaining portions of MD 140 between its southern terminus in Baltimore and I-795 are classified as National Highway System principal arterials.

=== Baltimore to Reisterstown ===
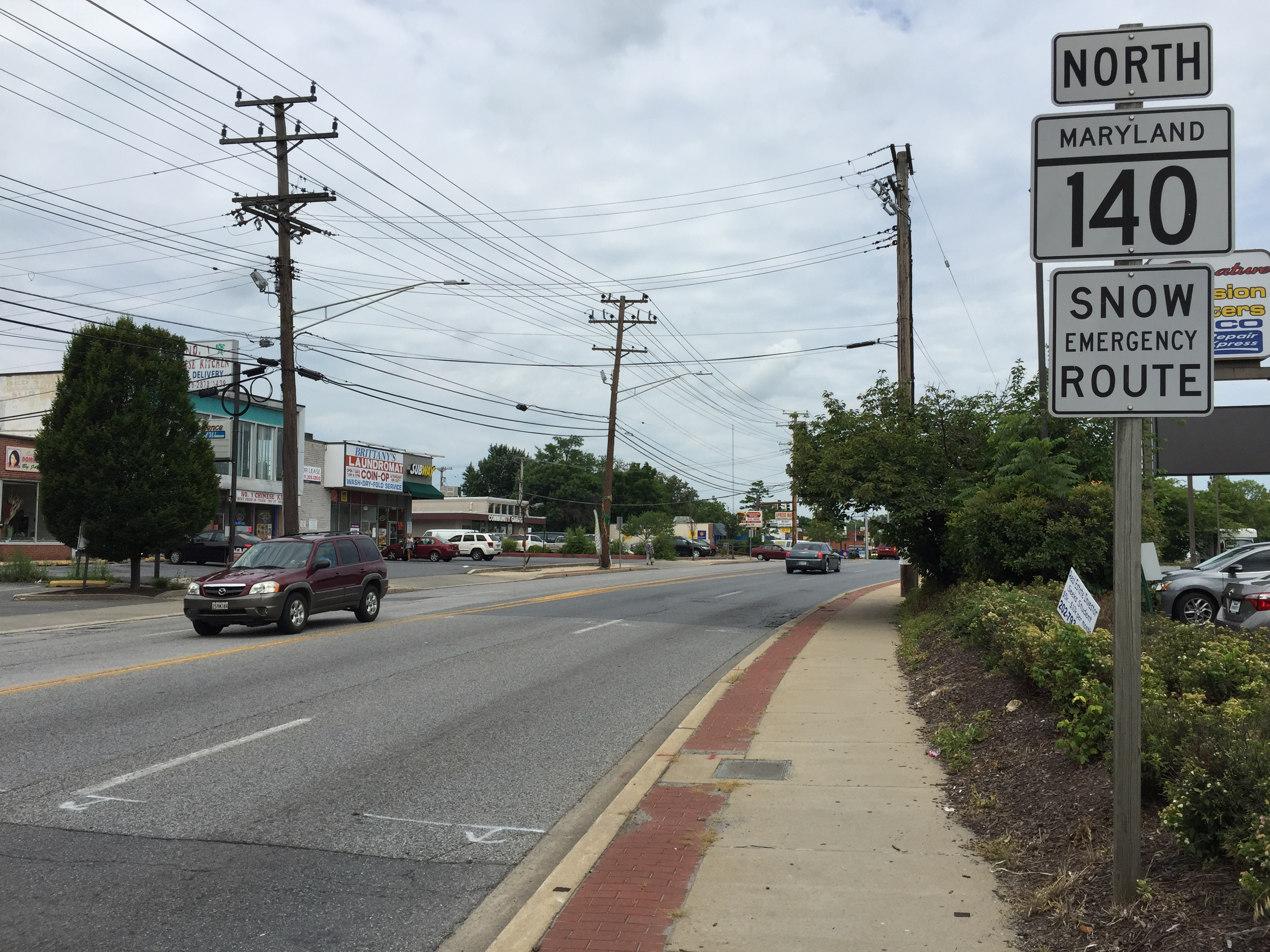
View north along MD 140 in Pikesville

MD 140 begins as a one-way pair of streets at North Avenue northwest of downtown Baltimore. Northbound MD 140 follows Fulton Avenue, which is a two-way street on both sides of North Avenue, and the southbound route follows one-way Monroe Street. US 40 Truck follows North Avenue through the pair of intersections, northbound US 1 enters from the south on Fulton Avenue and turns east onto North Avenue, and southbound US 1 enters from the east on North Avenue and turns south onto Monroe Street. Northbound MD 140 follows four-lane divided Fulton Avenue north for three blocks between the Penn North neighborhood to the east and Mondawmin on the west. The route reaches a four-way intersection with Pennsylvania Avenue and Reisterstown Road, which head southeast and northwest, respectively. Fulton Avenue veers northeast while MD 140 turns northwest onto Reisterstown Road. The highway passes along the southwest side of the Parkview/Woodbrook neighborhood and intersects Gwynns Falls Parkway just before Monroe Avenue splits off as a one-lane ramp from southbound Reisterstown Road. Monroe Avenue immediately expands to two lanes and intersects the parkway, heads southeast, then veers south toward southbound MD 140's terminus at North Avenue. One block north of the convergence of the one-way pair, the state highway intersects Liberty Heights Avenue, which heads west as MD 26, on the east side of Mondawmin Mall. Adjacent to the MD 140–MD 26 intersection is the Mondawmin station of MTA Maryland's Baltimore Metro SubwayLink.

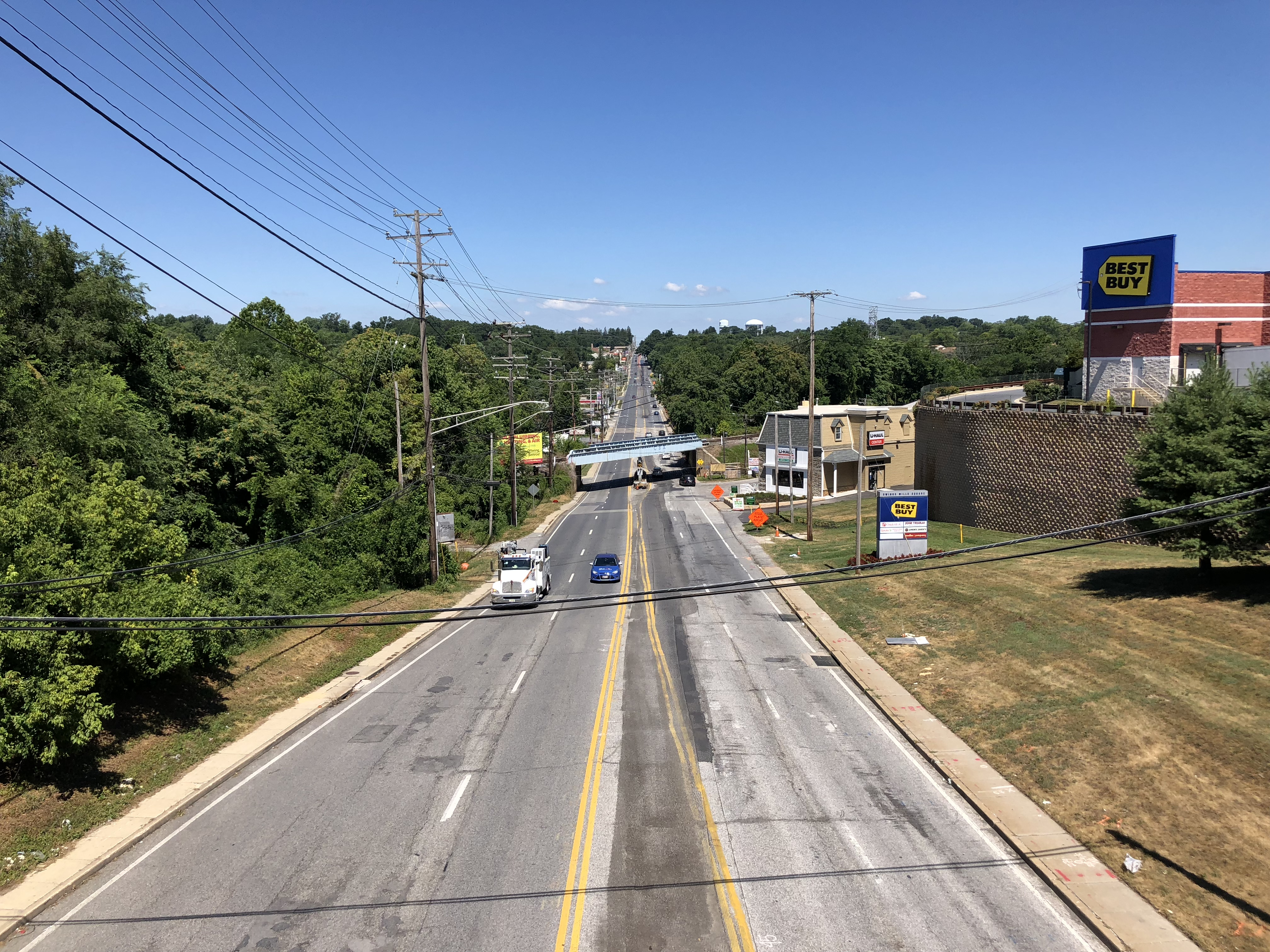
MD 140 northbound viewed from MD 940 in Owings Mills

MD 140 continues northwest as a six-lane boulevard along the northeast edge of the Liberty Square neighborhood. The highway has an oblique intersection with MD 129 (Auchentoroly Terrace)—there is no direct access from northbound MD 140 to southbound MD 129 or from northbound MD 129 to southbound MD 140—after which the two state highways run concurrently along the west side of Druid Hill Park. MD 140 and MD 129 diverge at a five-way intersection with Druid Park Drive that does not allow direct access from southbound MD 140 to northbound MD 129. MD 140 continues northwest as a four-lane undivided highway paralleled by MD 129 (Park Heights Avenue) one block to the east through the Park Circle neighborhood. MD 140 passes the Louisa May Alcott School and enters Central Park Heights, where the state highway intersects Cold Spring Lane before veering west along the northern edge of the Towanda-Grantley and Lucille Park neighborhoods and the southern edge of Langston Hughes neighborhood. At Belvedere Avenue, MD 140 veers northwest and enters a commercial area within the Woodmere neighborhood. The highway intersects Northern Parkway and passes between the neighborhoods of Glen to the northeast and Reisterstown Station on the southwest. Within the latter neighborhood is the Reisterstown Road Plaza shopping center and its attendant Metro SubwayLink station. MD 140 passes along the edge of the Falstaff neighborhood before leaving the city of Baltimore south of Seven Mile Lane.

MD 140 continues northwest through Pikesville as a four-lane undivided highway that passes the Pikesville Armory, Suburban Club Golf Course, the Maryland State Police headquarters, and Druid Ridge Cemetery and intersects Old Court Road. North of that county highway, the state highway gains a center turn lane and meets I-695 (Baltimore Beltway) at a single-point urban interchange. MD 140 meets the western end of MD 130 (Greenspring Valley Road) and passes the campus of Garrison Forest School in Garrison. Within Owings Mills, the state highway has a one-quadrant interchange with Owings Mills Boulevard, passes under the boulevard and CSX's Hanover Subdivision, and passes by the Owings Upper Mill complex. Shortly after entering Reisterstown, MD 140 intersects Franklin Boulevard and Cherry Hill Road and passes by Franklin High School and historic St. Michael's Church. The highway veers north, its name changes to Main Street, and it reduces to two lanes, with occasional center turn lanes, as it enters the Reisterstown Historic District. At the north end of the downtown area, the roadway continues north as MD 30 (Hanover Pike) and MD 140 turns northwest onto two-lane undivided Westminster Pike, now signed as an east-west highway.

=== Reisterstown to Emmitsburg ===
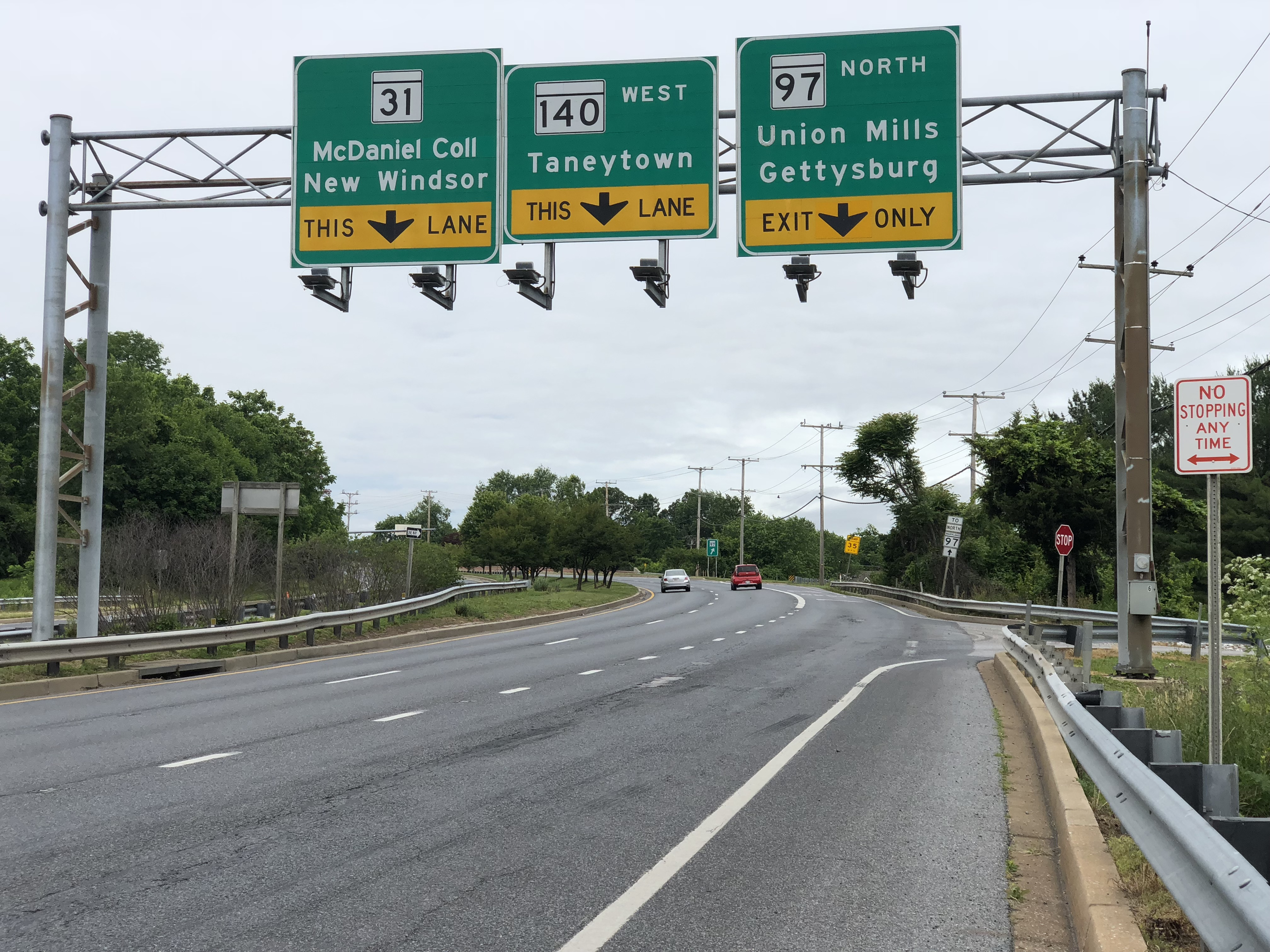
MD 140 westbound near its split with MD 97 northbound near Westminster

On the western edge of Reisterstown, MD 140 (now an east-west highway) has an intersection with the northern end of I-795 (Northwest Expressway) and MD 795, an unnamed and unsigned connector between this intersection and the intersection of MD 30 and MD 128 on the northern edge of Reisterstown. The state highway splits into a pair of flyover ramps that connect with ramps to and from I-795 west of the MD 795 intersection. The eastbound ramp is two-way west to Mitchell Drive, which provides access to the Reisterstown Sportsplex. The ramps merge and MD 140 continues northwest as a four-lane divided highway with a narrow median. West of Woodfield Court and Brian Daniel Court, which westbound MD 140 accesses via a ramp to Gores Mill Road, the median changes to a center left-turn lane. The highway descends into the valley of the North Branch of the Patapsco River and crosses the river and the Baltimore–Carroll county line at the northern end of the river's impoundment, Liberty Reservoir. MD 140 continues northwest as Baltimore Boulevard, now again a four-lane divided highway. The first of several segments of the highway's old alignment, Old Westminster Pike, splits to the southwest as the highway approaches Finksburg, where the highway intersects MD 879, which heads north as Cedarhurst Road and south as Old Gamber Road, and MD 91, which heads north as Emory Road and south as Gamber Road. Access from eastbound MD 140 to northbound MD 91 is via a jughandle in the southwest quadrant of the intersection.

Old Westminster Pike first closely parallels the westbound side of MD 140 and then splits west from the eastbound direction and parallels the state highway at a distance. MD 140 expands to six lanes and passes through a commercial area as it enters the city of Westminster. The highway intersects Malcolm Drive, which heads south as MD 97, and continues northwest concurrent with that state highway. The two highways pass the TownMall of Westminster just east of their partial cloverleaf interchange with MD 27 (Manchester Road), just west of which they cross over the Maryland Midland Railway. MD 140 and MD 97 become College View Boulevard at Sullivan Road; the highways diverge at a partial cloverleaf interchange where MD 97 heads north as Littlestown Pike and Pennsylvania Avenue heads south into the Westminster Historic District. MD 140 continues west as four-lane College View Boulevard, which becomes undivided three-lane (one lane westbound, two lanes eastbound) Taneytown Pike at its intersection with the northern end of MD 31 (New Windsor Road), which provides access to McDaniel College. There is no access from eastbound MD 31 to westbound MD 140; that movement is provided by WMC Drive to the west.

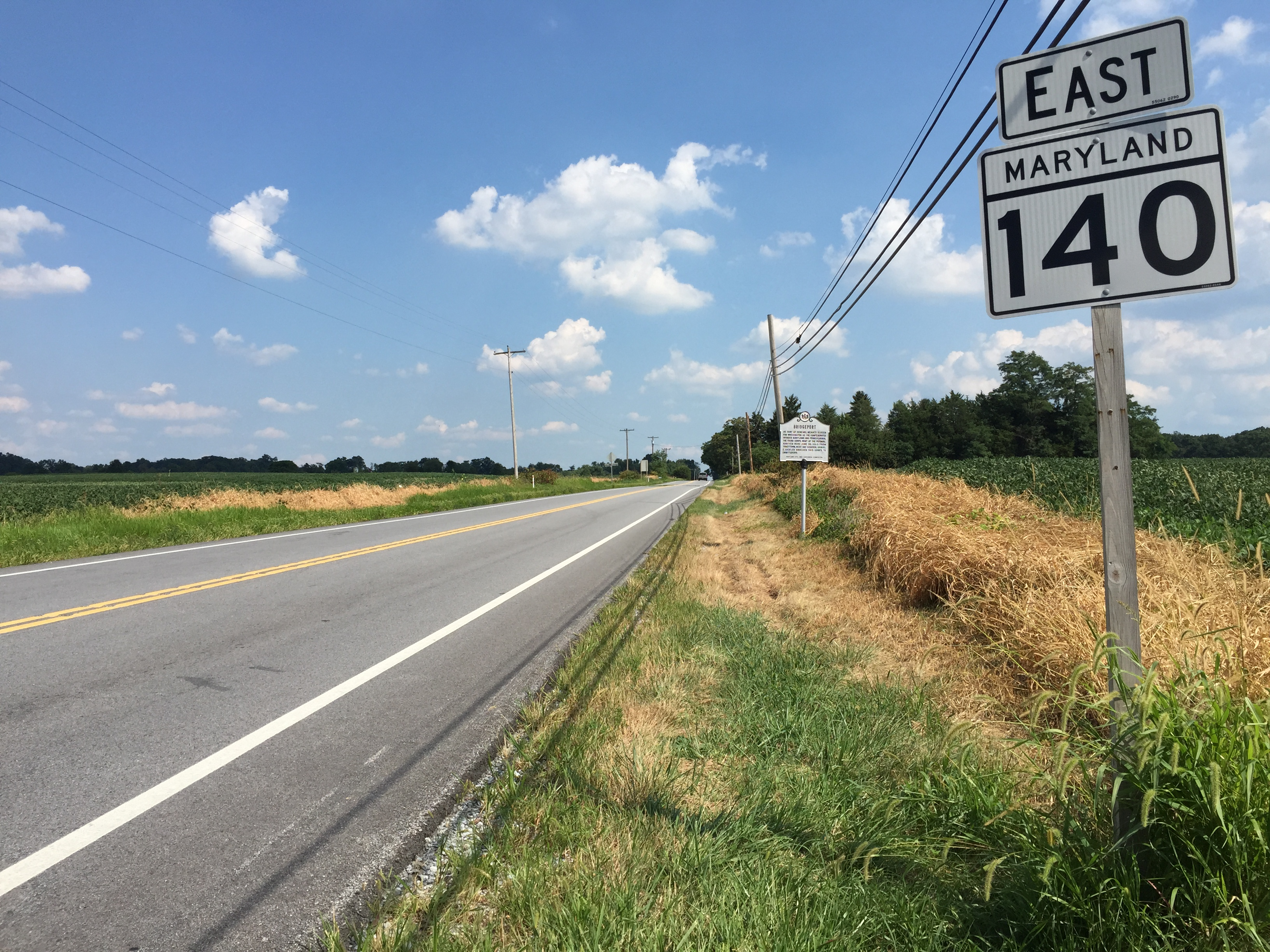
MD 140 eastbound in northwestern Carroll County

MD 140 heads northwest as a partially controlled access two-lane road. At Meadow Brook Farm and Roop's Mill on the western edge of the city of Westminster, the highway crosses Meadow Branch of Big Pipe Creek and has an intersection with Hughes Shop Road and the eastern end of MD 832 (Old Taneytown Road). MD 140 parallels MD 832 to the north as the main highway bypasses Frizzelburg and crosses Richardson Road, Bear Branch, and the mainstem of Big Pipe Creek. The two state highways reunite at a roundabout on the eastern edge of the city of Taneytown. Antrim Boulevard forms the southwest leg of the roundabout and MD 140 continues northwest along Baltimore Street into the Taneytown Historic District. The state highway passes to the north of the historic home Antrim and has a grade crossing of the north–south line of the Maryland Midland Railway before intersecting MD 194, which heads north as York Street and south as Frederick Street. MD 140 becomes Taneytown Pike again on leaving Taneytown and crosses Piney Creek.

MD 140 crosses the Monocacy River to enter Frederick County. The highway crosses Cattail Branch and Middle Creek and enters the town of Emmitsburg just east of the highway's extended interchange with US 15 (Catoctin Mountain Highway). East of the U.S. Highway, MD 140 has a four-way intersection with Harney Road and Emmit Gardens Drive, which is unsigned MD 904H (Emmit Gardens Drive) and leads to a right-in/right-out interchange with northbound US 15. MD 140 becomes Main Street and crosses over the U.S. Highway, then has a four-way intersection with Silo Hill Road and unsigned MD 904F, another section of Emmit Gardens Drive that leads to the right-in/right-out ramps with southbound US 15. MD 140 crosses Flat Run and enters the Emmitsburg Historic District. In the center of town, the highway intersects US 15 Business (Seton Avenue). MD 140 leaves the town and gains the name Waynesboro Pike for the short distance northwest to the Pennsylvania state line. Waynesboro Pike continues northwest as PA 16 across South Mountain toward Waynesboro.

== History ==

Until 1979, MD 140 was US 140. Before US 140 was deleted, it was where MD 140 is today. At the divergence of MD 140 and MD 97 northwest of Westminster, the two routes were swapped after the deletion of the U.S. route; MD 97 now follows US 140's old route to Pennsylvania, while MD 140 follows MD 97's original route to Taneytown and US 15. As a result, MD 140 follows the bypass of the original MD 32 between Westminster and Taneytown that was first designated as part of MD 97.

In 1977, plans were made for US 140 to be decommissioned, with the route to be replaced by MD 140 between Baltimore and Westminster, MD 97 between Westminster and the Pennsylvania state line, and PA 97 between the Maryland state line and Gettysburg. This proposal was made in order to eliminate short routes from the U.S. Highway System. The American Association of State Highway and Transportation Officials approved the removal of the US 140 designation on October 28, 1977. At one point, the section between MD 30 in Reisterstown and Westminster was to become a part of MD 9, which would continue northwest to Emmitsburg; MD 140 was to be designated between Baltimore and Reisterstown. US 140 was decommissioned on January 1, 1979 and became MD 140 between Baltimore and Westminster; MD 140 also ran along the former alignment of MD 97 between Westminster and Emmitsburg; MD 97 replaced US 140 between Westminster and the Pennsylvania border.

== Junction list ==
MD 140 is signed north–south from US 1 in Baltimore to MD 30 in Reisterstown and east–west from MD 30 to the Pennsylvania state line.

County	Location	mi	km	Destinations	Notes
Baltimore City		0.00	0.00	US 1 / US 40 Truck (North Avenue) / Fulton Street south	Southern terminus
Baltimore City		0.71	1.14	MD 26 west (Liberty Heights Avenue) / Liberty Heights Avenue east	Eastern terminus of MD 26
Baltimore City		0.96	1.54	MD 129 south (Auchentoroly Terrace)	No direct access from northbound MD 140 to southbound MD 129 or from northbound MD 129 to southbound MD 140
Baltimore City		1.27	2.04	MD 129 north (Park Heights Avenue) / Druid Park Drive	No direct access from southbound MD 140 to northbound MD 129
Baltimore City		2.36	3.80	Cold Spring Lane	
Baltimore City		3.89	6.26	Northern Parkway	
Baltimore	Pikesville	6.69	10.77	Old Court Road	
Baltimore	Pikesville	7.26	11.68	I-695 (Baltimore Beltway) – Glen Burnie, Towson	I-695 Exit 20; single-point urban interchange
Baltimore	Garrison	9.09	14.63	MD 130 east (Greenspring Valley Road) – Brooklandville	Western terminus of MD 130
Baltimore	Owings Mills	10.59	17.04	MD 940 (Owings Mills Boulevard) to I-795	One-quadrant interchange
Baltimore	Reisterstown	15.26	24.56	MD 30 north (Hanover Pike) – Hampstead	Southern terminus of MD 30
Baltimore	Reisterstown	15.69	25.25	I-795 south (Northwest Expressway) / MD 795 to MD 30 / MD 128 – Baltimore, Butler, Hanover	Northern terminus of I-795; MD 795 is unsigned
Baltimore	Reisterstown	16.21	26.09	I-795 south (Northwest Expressway) – Owings Mills, Baltimore	Northern terminus of I-795; eastbound exit to and westbound entrance from I-795
Carroll	Finksburg	18.95	30.50	MD 879 (Old Gamber Road/Cedarhurst Road)	Officially MD 879D
Carroll	Finksburg	19.15	30.82	MD 91 (Gamber Road/Emory Road) – Gamber, Upperco	Access from eastbound MD 140 to northbound MD 91 is via jughandle
Carroll	Westminster	25.80	41.52	MD 97 south (Malcolm Drive) – Eldersburg	East end of concurrency with MD 97
Carroll	Westminster	27.16	43.71	MD 27 (Manchester Road) – Downtown Westminster, Manchester, Hampstead	Partial cloverleaf interchange
Carroll	Westminster	28.12	45.25	MD 97 north (Littlestown Pike) / Pennsylvania Avenue south – Union Mills, Gettysburg	Partial cloverleaf interchange; west end of concurrency with MD 97
Carroll	Westminster	28.53	45.91	MD 31 west (New Windsor Road) – New Windsor, McDaniel College	Eastern terminus of MD 31; no direct access from eastbound MD 31 to westbound MD 140
Carroll	Westminster	30.14	48.51	MD 832 west (Old Taneytown Road) / Hughes Shop Road north – Frizzelburg	Eastern terminus of MD 832
Carroll	Taneytown	37.85	60.91	MD 832 east (Old Taneytown Road) / Antrim Boulevard west	Taneytown Roundabout; western terminus of MD 832
Carroll	Taneytown	39.28	63.22	MD 194 (Frederick Street/York Street) – Woodsboro, Littlestown, PA	
Frederick	Emmitsburg	47.35	76.20	US 15 (Catoctin Mountain Highway) – Frederick, Gettysburg	Interchange; connectors with northbound and southbound US 15 are named Emmit Gardens Drive and are officially MD 904H and MD 904F, respectively
Frederick	Emmitsburg	48.05	77.33	US 15 Bus. (Seton Avenue)	
Frederick	Emmitsburg	49.73	80.03	PA 16 west (Waynesboro Pike) – Waynesboro	Pennsylvania state line; western terminus
1.000 mi = 1.609 km; 1.000 km = 0.621 mi: Concurrency terminus; Incomplete access
