= List of former Maryland state highways (600–699) =

Highway names
- Interstates: Interstate X (I-X)
- US Highways: U.S. Route X (US X)
- State: Maryland Route X (MD X)
- Former state highways: 2–199; 200–399; 400–499; 500–599; 600–699; 700–999

System links
- Maryland highway system; Interstate; US; State; Scenic Byways

The Maryland highway system has several hundred former state highways. These highways were constructed, maintained, or funded by the Maryland State Roads Commission or Maryland State Highway Administration and assigned a unique or temporally unique number. Some time after the highway was assigned, the highway was transferred to county or municipal maintenance and the number designation was removed from the particular stretch of road. In some cases, a highway was renumbered in whole or in part. This list contains all or most of the state-numbered highways between 600 and 699 that have existed since highways were first numbered in 1927 but are no longer part of the state highway system or are state highways of a different number. Most former state highways have not had their numbers reused. However, many state highway numbers were used for a former highway and are currently in use. Some numbers have been used three times. The former highways below whose numbers are used presently, those that were taken over in whole or in part by another highway, or have enough information to warrant a separate article contain links to those separate highway articles. Highway numbers that have two or more former uses are differentiated below by year ranges. This list does not include former Interstate or U.S. Highways, which are linked from their respective lists.

== MD 600 ==
Maryland Route 600
- Location: Essex–Middle River
- Existed: 1944–1956

Maryland Route 600 was the designation for Old Eastern Avenue, which ran from MD 150 in Essex east to MD 150 in Middle River. The highway was assigned after MD 150 was relocated to its present four-lane divided highway as a military access project between 1942 and 1944. MD 600 was removed from the state highway system in 1956.

== MD 602 ==
Maryland Route 602
- Location: Laurel–Fort Meade
- Existed: 1944–1956

Maryland Route 602 was the designation for Fort Meade Road, which ran from US 1 in Laurel east to Fort George G. Meade. The highway was a military access project during World War II. The first segment of the new highway, from US 1 to what was then MD 216 near Brock Bridge Road in what is now Maryland City, was started in 1943 and completed in 1944. This segment included a bridge across the Baltimore & Ohio Railroad (now CSX) in Laurel and a bridge across the Patuxent River. The remainder of MD 602, from near Brock Bridge Road to the entrance to Fort Meade near the Little Patuxent River, was completed by 1946. The highway was replaced by an eastward extension of MD 198 in 1963.

== MD 604 ==
Maryland Route 604
- Location: Damascus
- Existed: 1935–1956

Maryland Route 604 was the designation for Watkins Road from east of Davis Mill Road to west of Wildcat Road near Damascus in northern Montgomery County. The highway was constructed as a macadam road in 1934 and 1935. MD 604 was removed from the state highway system in 1956.

== MD 605 ==
Maryland Route 605
- Location: Takoma Park
- Length: 0.28 mi (450 m)
- Existed: 1935–2005

Maryland Route 605 was the designation for Takoma Avenue, which ran 0.28 miles (0.45 km) from Eastern Avenue at the District of Columbia boundary north to the intersection of Takoma Avenue, Albany Avenue, and Fenton Street within Takoma Park in southeastern Montgomery County. The street was paved as a concrete road in 1935. MD 605 was transferred from state to municipal maintenance in 2005.

== MD 606 ==
Maryland Route 606
- Location: Centreville
- Length: 2.27 mi (3.65 km)
- Existed: 1935–1950

Maryland Route 606 was the 2.27-mile-long (3.65 km) designation for Corsica Neck Road from Spider Web Road east to MD 304 in Centreville in central Queen Anne's County. The highway was constructed as a macadam road west from Centreville Landing, the wharf area for Centreville, in 1935. The highway included a new bridge across the Old Mill Stream Branch of the Corsica River in 1936 and 1937. The short piece of MD 606 west of its intersection with MD 304 was resurfaced in 1949. The following year, MD 304 was extended west along the full course of MD 606.

== MD 608 ==
Maryland Route 608
- Location: Sykesville
- Existed: 1935–1954

Maryland Route 608 was the designation for Raincliffe Road from the east town limit of Sykesville east toward Arrington Road in southeastern Carroll County. The highway was constructed as a macadam road in 1935. MD 608 was removed from the state highway system in 1954.

== MD 609 ==
Maryland Route 609
- Location: Norbeck–Norwood
- Existed: 1935–1981

Maryland Route 609 was the designation for Norbeck Road from MD 97 at Norbeck east to MD 182 near Norwood in eastern Montgomery County. The highway was constructed as a gravel road in 1934 and 1935. MD 609's western terminus was a short distance north of the MD 28–MD 97 intersection. In 1981, MD 609's western end was relocated to the MD 28–MD 97 intersection and MD 609 was renumbered as an eastward extension of MD 28.

== MD 612 ==
Maryland Route 612
- Location: Harney
- Existed: 1935–1954

Maryland Route 612 was the designation for Harney Road from Harney in northwestern Carroll County north to the Pennsylvania state line, where the highway continued as Pennsylvania Route 134. The highway was built as a macadam road in 1935. MD 612 was removed from the state highway system in 1954.

== MD 613 ==
Maryland Route 613
- Location: Friendship–Rose Haven
- Existed: 1936–1963

Maryland Route 613 was the designation for Friendship Road from MD 2 (now MD 778) at Friendship east to Rose Haven in southern Anne Arundel County. The highway was built from MD 2 east to Boyds Turn Road between 1934 and 1936. The highway was extended east to Rose Haven in 1948 and 1949. MD 613 was replaced by a westward extension of MD 261 in 1963.

== MD 616 ==
Maryland Route 616
- Location: Broadfording
- Existed: 1936–1954

Maryland Route 616 was the designation for Broadfording Road from Gossard Mill Road near Fairview east to Broadfording just east of Conococheague Creek in western Washington County. The highway was constructed in 1936. MD 616 was removed from the state highway system in 1954.

== MD 617 ==
Maryland Route 617
- Location: American Corner
- Existed: 1937–1958

Maryland Route 617 was the designation for American Corner Road from near Laurel Grove Road north to MD 621 at American Corner in southern Caroline County. The highway was constructed in 1936 and 1937. MD 617 was removed from the state highway system in 1958.

== MD 618 ==
Maryland Route 618
- Location: New Midway–Detour
- Existed: 1936–1956

Maryland Route 618 was the designation for Detour Road from a short distance north of MD 71 (now MD 194) at New Midway north to MD 77 at Detour in northeastern Frederick County. The highway was built in 1936. MD 618 was removed from the state highway system in 1956.

== MD 619 ==
Maryland Route 619
- Location: Union Bridge
- Existed: 1938–1954

Maryland Route 619 was the designation for Locust Street and Quaker Hill Road from MD 75 in Union Bridge southeast toward McKinstry's Mill in western Carroll County. The highway was constructed as a 16-foot-wide (4.9 m) stabilized earth road in 1938. MD 619 was removed from the state highway system in 1954.

== MD 620 ==
Maryland Route 620
- Location: Taneytown
- Existed: 1938–1956

Maryland Route 620 was the designation for Trevanion Road from MD 32 (now MD 140 in Taneytown southeast toward Uniontown in northwestern Carroll County. The portion closest to Taneytown was constructed as a 16-foot-wide (4.9 m) stabilized earth road in 1938. The second segment of MD 620 was built by 1946. The third section of the highway was constructed as a macadam road in 1946 and 1947. MD 620 was removed from the state highway system in 1956.

== MD 621 ==
Maryland Route 621
- Location: Grove–Federalsburg
- Existed: 1938–1991

Maryland Route 621 was the designation for what is now Auction Road from MD 16 near Grove east to MD 313 near Federalsburg in southern Caroline County. The highway was originally built from Grove to MD 313, which then passed through American Corner, in 1938. MD 313 was moved to its present alignment between Federalsburg and Denton in 1954; the portion of MD 313 through American Corner was replaced by MD 630. By 1959, MD 621 was extended east from American Corner to modern MD 313. MD 621 was removed from the state highway system in 1991.

== MD 622 ==
Maryland Route 622
- Location: Westminster
- Existed: 1938–1956

Maryland Route 622 was the designation for Stone Chapel Road from MD 27 south of Westminster to MD 31 west of Westminster in central Carroll County. The first section of the highway was built as a 16-foot-wide (4.9 m) macadam road from MD 31 at the hamlet of Avondale south to near Chapel Road in 1938. A separate segment of MD 622 was built west from MD 27 at the hamlet of Warfieldsburg west to Bowersox Road in 1939. The gap in the highway was filled in 1951. MD 622 was removed from the state highway system in 1956.

== MD 625 ==
Maryland Route 625
- Location: Sabillasville
- Existed: 1936–c. 1950

Maryland Route 625 was the designation for Old Sabillasville Road from MD 81 (now MD 550) in Sabillasville north to the Pennsylvania state line at Blue Ridge Summit. The highway was constructed as a macadam road by 1927 and was marked as MD 81 by 1933. In 1936, MD 81 was relocated to MD 550's present course that does not enter Pennsylvania. MD 625 was assigned to the old road by 1939 and removed from the state highway system in or shortly after 1950.

== MD 626 ==
Maryland Route 626
- Location: West Ocean City
- Length: 0.72 mi (1,160 m)
- Existed: 1936–2001

Maryland Route 626 was the designation for Golf Course Road and Sunset Avenue, a 0.72-mile (1.16 km) L-shaped route that ran from MD 707 (now Old Bridge Road) to road end at Sinepuxent Bay in West Ocean City in northern Worcester County. The highway was constructed as Wharf Road in 1936. MD 626 was transferred from state to county maintenance in 2001.

== MD 628 ==
Maryland Route 628
- Location: Sideling Hill
- Existed: 1938–1956

Maryland Route 628 was the designation for Rice Road and part of Resley Road from what is now Old Route 40 east of Sideling Hill north and east to the Pennsylvania state line in far western Washington County. The highway was built from US 40 in 1938. MD 628 was removed from the state highway system in 1956.

== MD 629 ==
Maryland Route 629
- Location: Sideling Hill
- Existed: 1938–1956

Maryland Route 629 was the designation for Exline Road from MD 453 (now Woodmont Road) north to what is now Old Route 40 east of Sideling Hill in far western Washington County. The highway was built from MD 453 to US 40 in 1938. MD 629 was removed from the state highway system in 1956.

== MD 630 (1936–1951) ==
Maryland Route 630
- Location: Frizzelburg
- Existed: 1936–1951

Maryland Route 630 was the designation for Baust Church Road from a point north of Uniontown north to MD 32 (now MD 832 near Frizzelburg in central Carroll County. The highway was constructed in 1936. MD 630 was renumbered as a second segment of MD 84 in 1951.

== MD 630 (1954–1957) ==
Maryland Route 630
- Location: Federalsburg–Williston
- Existed: 1954–1957

Maryland Route 630 was the designation for what is now Auction Road from MD 313 near Federalsburg to American Corner and American Corner Road from there to MD 16 near Williston in southern Caroline County. That highway was part of the original route of MD 313, which was designated and paved through southern Caroline County by 1927. After MD 313 was moved to its present course between Federalsburg and Denton in 1954, MD 630 was assigned to the old highway between MD 313 and MD 16. MD 630 was removed from the state highway system in or shortly after 1957; the portion east of American Corner became an eastward extension of MD 621 by 1959.

== MD 635 ==
Maryland Route 635
- Location: Havre de Grace
- Existed: 1938–1956

Maryland Route 635 was the designation for Oakington Road east from MD 22 (now MD 132 near Havre de Grace in southeastern Harford County. The highway was constructed as a gravel road in 1938. MD 635 was removed from the state highway system in 1956.

== MD 639 ==
Maryland Route 639
- Location: Gorman
- Existed: 1950–1954

Maryland Route 639 was the designation for a short portion of White Church Steyer Road east from MD 560 near Gorman in southern Garrett County. The highway was constructed as an extension south of the northern piece of a two-segment MD 560 in 1939. The gap between the two segments of MD 560 was filled along a new alignment in 1950. The portion of former MD 560 on White Church Steyer Road became MD 639. MD 639 was removed from the state highway system in 1954.

== MD 640 ==
Maryland Route 640
- Location: Urbana
- Existed: 1938–1956

Maryland Route 640 was the designation for Thurston Road from Bennett Creek north to MD 80 near Urbana in southern Frederick County. The highway was built in 1938. MD 640 was removed from the state highway system in 1956.

== MD 641 ==
Maryland Route 641
- Location: Urbana
- Existed: 1938–1956

Maryland Route 641 was the designation for Simpson Mill Road and Keymar Road from MD 75 in Johnsville north to the Frederick–Carroll county line at Little Pipe Creek in eastern Frederick County. The first segment of the highway was built south from Little Pipe Creek in 1938. A second segment of MD 641 was built along Keymar Road by 1946. The two segments were joined into one route by 1950. MD 641 was removed from the state highway system in 1956.

== MD 647 ==
Maryland Route 647
- Location: Annapolis Junction
- Existed: c. 1946–1950

Maryland Route 647 was the temporary designation for Guilford Road for a short distance on either side of its Baltimore & Ohio Railroad crossing at the Anne Arundel–Howard line at Annapolis Junction. MD 647 was assigned to Guilford Road on either side of the railroad by 1946 but removed in 1950.

== MD 651 ==
Maryland Route 651
- Location: Pylesville
- Existed: 1939–1955

Maryland Route 651 was the designation for St. Clair Bridge Road south from MD 165 near Pylesville in northern Harford County. The highway was built in 1939. MD 651 was removed from the state highway system in 1955.

== MD 652 ==
Maryland Route 652
- Location: Bellegrove
- Existed: 1939–c. 1946

Maryland Route 652 was the designation for Orleans Road from US 40 (now US 40 Scenic) north to the Pennsylvania state line near Bellegrove in eastern Allegany County. The highway was brought into the state highway system in 1939 but was removed in or sometime after 1946.

== MD 653 ==
Maryland Route 653
- Location: Silver Spring
- Existed: 1939–1955

Maryland Route 653 was the designation for the extension of 16th Street from the District of Columbia boundary north to MD 410 in Silver Spring in southeastern Montgomery County. The highway was constructed as a concrete road by 1935. MD 653 was widened and resurfaced in 1949. The highway was expanded to a divided highway and extended north to MD 97 starting in 1958. However, by the time the divided highway was completed in 1960, MD 653 was replaced by MD 390.

== MD 655 ==
Maryland Route 655
- Location: Klondike
- Existed: 1939–1954

Maryland Route 655 was the designation for Klondike Road from the village of Klondike east to MD 36 (now MD 936) near Midland in western Allegany County. The highway was brought into the state highway system in 1939 and transferred back to the county in 1954.

== MD 657 ==
Maryland Route 657
- Location: Lonaconing
- Length: 1.82 mi (2.93 km)
- Existed: 1939–2011

Maryland Route 657 was the designation for Douglas Avenue and Skids Hill Road, which together ran 1.82 miles (2.93 km) from MD 36 in Lonaconing north to the Allegany–Garrett county line, where the road continued as Avilton–Lonaconing Road. Douglas Avenue was maintained by the town of Lonaconing, and Skids Hill Road was maintained by the Maryland State Highway Administration. Skids Hill Road, then a county highway, was improved as an untreated stone road by the Maryland State Roads Commission in 1934. MD 657 was assigned to that highway and Douglas Avenue when the state assumed maintenance of Skids Hill Road in a February 28, 1939, resolution of the State Roads Commission. On December 20, 2008, the state and county signed a road transfer agreement in which the state would assume maintenance over Messick Road and part of Williams Road near Cumberland, now part of MD 639, in exchange for the county taking control of the Skids Hill Road portion of MD 657 after that highway was reconstructed. The Maryland State Highway Administration planned to reconstruct the highway, including widening the roadway and adding retaining walls, in 2010. Coincidentally, in March 2010, a 50-foot-wide (15 m) section of the state highway was damaged by a torrent of water released from an abandoned mine following several days of rainfall, requiring an emergency repair project that reduced the roadway's width at the site from 15 feet (4.6 m) to 13.5 feet (4.1 m). The state reconstructed the highway between April and December 2010. The official transfer of maintenance of Skids Hill Road occurred in 2011; Douglas Avenue within Lonaconing, which had carried the MD 657 designation for continuity purposes only, remained under town maintenance.

== MD 661 ==
Maryland Route 661
- Location: Pomona
- Length: 2.22 mi (3.57 km)
- Existed: 1939–1994

Maryland Route 661 was the designation for Quaker Neck Landing Road, which ran 2.22 miles (3.57 km) from MD 289 near Pomona to a dead end at the Chester River in central Kent County. Quaker Neck Landing Road was improved by the Maryland State Roads Commission in 1936 and 1938, and the highway was brought into the state system as MD 661 by a motion of the commission on April 28, 1939. The highway was resurfaced with bituminous concrete in 1973. MD 661 was transferred from state to county maintenance through a November 18, 1994, road transfer agreement.

== MD 662 ==
Maryland Route 662
- Location: Kennedyville
- Length: 3.13 mi (5.04 km)
- Existed: 1939–1946

Maryland Route 662 was the designation for Turners Creek Road, which ran 3.13 miles (5.04 km) from the railroad crossing in Kennedyville north to the end of state maintenance near Turners Creek, a tributary of the Sassafras River, in northern Kent County. The first 1.5-mile-long (2.4 km) section of MD 662 was improved as a macadam road in 1936 and 1938 and brought into the state highway system in 1939. The second 1.5-mile-long (2.4 km) section of the highway was improved as a macadam road in 1940. Late in 1945, the 413-foot-long (126 m) piece of 16-foot-wide (4.9 m) stabilized gravel road between the railroad crossing and the intersection of US 213 and MD 448 in Kennedyville was brought into the state highway system. By the next year, MD 662 had been subsumed by a northward extension of MD 448.

== MD 663 ==
Maryland Route 663
- Location: Fruitland–Salisbury
- Existed: 1939–1956

Maryland Route 663 was the designation for Camden Avenue from US 13 (now US 13 Business) south of Fruitland north to US 50 (Main Street) in Salisbury in central Wicomico County. The section from the intersection of Camden Avenue and Allen Road near Fruitland to the Salisbury city limit was constructed as a macadam road in 1911 and 1912. This segment, the portion of Camden Avenue in the city, and Allen Road south of Fruitland became part of US 13 in 1927. The portion of Camden Avenue between Allen Road and Salisbury Boulevard was constructed as a concrete road in 1933 as part of a relocation of US 13 south of Fruitland; Allen Road became part of MD 529. MD 663 was assigned to Camden Avenue after US 13 was placed on newly constructed Salisbury Boulevard from south of Fruitland to Salisbury in 1939. The highway was extended north from downtown Salisbury along North Division Street, replacing MD 475, in 1954. MD 663 was removed from the state highway system in 1956, when most of it was replaced with a northern extension of MD 529.

== MD 664 ==
Maryland Route 664
- Location: Chestertown
- Length: 1.65 mi (2.66 km)
- Existed: 1940–1994

Maryland Route 664 was the designation for Wilkins Lane, which ran 1.65 miles (2.66 km) from MD 289 near Chestertown to a dead end near the Chester River in central Kent County. Wilkins Lane was improved with a bituminous surface by the Maryland State Roads Commission and brought into the state system in 1940. MD 664 was transferred from state to county maintenance through a November 18, 1994, road transfer agreement.

== MD 666 ==
Maryland Route 666
- Location: Kensington
- Existed: c. 1938–1958

Maryland Route 666 was the designation for Armory Avenue, Howard Avenue, and St. Paul Street in Kensington in southern Montgomery County. The streets were paved by 1927 as the original course of MD 193 through Kensington. The current course of MD 193 and what is now MD 185 was established when the highway's bridge across the Baltimore & Ohio Railroad was completed in 1938. The old course directly through the center of Kensington became MD 666. MD 666 was removed from the state highway system in 1958.

== MD 669 ==
Maryland Route 669
- Location: Boonsboro
- Existed: 1939–1954

Maryland Route 669 was the designation for Benevola Church Road west from MD 66 near Boonsboro in eastern Washington County. The highway was built as a stone road in 1939. MD 669 was removed from the state highway system in 1954.

== MD 671 ==
Maryland Route 671
- Location: Girdletree
- Existed: 1939–1956

Maryland Route 671 was the designation for Taylor Landing Road from MD 12 at Girdletree east to near Bayview Road in southern Worcester County. The highway was built in 1939. MD 671 was removed from the state highway system in 1956.

== MD 677 ==
Maryland Route 677
- Location: Odenton
- Length: 0.94 mi (1,510 m)
- Existed: 1939–2003

Maryland Route 677 was the designation for the 0.94-mile (1.51 km) portion of Odenton Road from Piney Orchard Parkway east to MD 175 in Odenton in western Anne Arundel County. Odenton Road was improved as a concrete road by 1933 and designated MD 180. MD 180 was relocated to a new alignment through Odenton that included an overpass of the Pennsylvania Railroad in 1938 and 1939. The old alignment from Fort George G. Meade to east of the center of Odenton became MD 677. By 1978, MD 677 had been eliminated from the west side of the railroad. The highway's western end was rolled back to MD 170 (now Piney Orchard Parkway) in 1985. MD 677 was transferred from state to county maintenance in 2003.

== MD 678 ==
Maryland Route 678
- Location: Finksburg
- Existed: 1938–1956

Maryland Route 678 was the designation for Deer Park Road northwest from MD 91 near Finksburg. The highway was built as a 16-foot-wide (4.9 m) crushed-stone road in 1938. MD 678 was removed from the state highway system in 1956.

== MD 680 ==
Maryland Route 680
- Location: Woodbine
- Existed: 1939–1954

Maryland Route 680 was the designation for two disjoint segments of Gillis Falls Road near Woodbine in southwestern Carroll County. The first segment was built west from MD 94 in 1939. The second segment was built between the first segment and MD 27 by 1946. Both portions of MD 680 were removed from the state highway system in 1954.

== MD 681 ==
Maryland Route 681
- Location: Frizzelburg
- Existed: 1938–1950

Maryland Route 681 was the designation for Hughes Shop Road north from MD 32 (now MD 140) at Frizzelburg in central Carroll County. The highway was built as a 16-foot-wide (4.9 m) crushed-stone road in 1938. MD 681 was removed from the state highway system in 1950.

== MD 682 ==
Maryland Route 682
- Location: Lineboro
- Existed: 1939–1956

Maryland Route 682 was the designation for Church Street from MD 86 in Lineboro in northeastern Carroll County north to the Pennsylvania state line. The highway was built in 1939. MD 682 was removed from the state highway system in 1956.

== MD 683 ==
Maryland Route 683
- Location: Westminster
- Existed: 1939–1956

Maryland Route 683 was the designation for Poole Road southeast from US 140 (now Main Street) in Westminster in central Carroll County. The highway was built in 1939. MD 683 was removed from the state highway system in 1956.

== MD 685 ==
Maryland Route 685
- Location: Hack Point
- Existed: 1953–1979

Maryland Route 685 was the designation for a pair of roads on the south side of the Bohemia River at Hack Point in southern Cecil County.

- MD 685 was the designation for Frontage Road, a 0.16-mile-long (0.26 km) loop between intersections with MD 213.
- MD 685A was the designation for Frontage Road Spur, a 0.06-mile-long (0.097 km) spur from MD 685 to a dead end.

US 213 was relocated on the south approach to the Bohemia Bridge in 1950 and 1951. In 1953, MD 685 was assigned to the pieces of US 213 left behind by the relocation. Both sections of the highway were returned to county maintenance through a December 27, 1979, road transfer agreement.

== MD 686 ==
Maryland Route 686
- Location: Brooklyn Park–Baltimore
- Existed: 1946–c. 2005

Maryland Route 686 was the designation for 2nd Street in Brooklyn Park in Anne Arundel County and the adjacent Brooklyn neighborhood of Baltimore. The highway's northern end was at MD 173. MD 686 was assigned to 2nd Street by 1946. The highway was removed from Anne Arundel County by 1999, but remained in the city as late as 2005. The MD 686 designation was gone from Baltimore by 2013.

== MD 687 ==
Maryland Route 687
- Location: Taylorsville
- Existed: 1939–1956

Maryland Route 687 was the designation for Gillis Road east from MD 27 near Taylorsville in southwestern Carroll County. The highway was built in 1939. MD 687 was removed from the state highway system in 1956.

== MD 688 ==
Maryland Route 688
- Location: Derwood
- Existed: c. 1946–1958

Maryland Route 688 was the designation for Redland Road from US 240 (now MD 355) north toward MD 115 in Derwood in central Montgomery County. The highway was brought into the state highway system by 1946. MD 688 was removed from the state highway system in 1958.

== MD 690 ==
Maryland Route 690
- Location: Rising Sun
- Length: 1.46 mi (2.35 km)
- Existed: 1957–1958

Maryland Route 690 was the designation for Half Mile Turn and Sylmar Road, which together ran 1.46 miles (2.35 km) from MD 273 east of Rising Sun north to the Pennsylvania state line in northern Cecil County. US 1 originally followed what is now MD 273 through Rising Sun and then made a right-angle turn north onto Sylmar Road to head into Pennsylvania. In 1935, US 1 was placed on a sweeping curve, Half Mile Turn, to avoid the right-angle turn. The bypassed east–west segment became part of MD 273, and the bypassed north–south segment became MD 592. MD 690 was assigned to Half Mile Turn and Sylmar Road north of MD 592 after US 1's bypass of Rising Sun was completed in 1957. Less than a year later, MD 690 was transferred from state to county maintenance through a May 8, 1958, road transfer agreement.

== MD 691 ==
Maryland Route 691
- Location: Hagerstown–Funkstown
- Existed: c. 1939–1948

Maryland Route 691 was the temporary designation for what is now U.S. Route 40 in Maryland from Hagerstown to a point east of Funkstown in central Washington County. The highway was completed from Antietam Creek to east of Funkstown by 1939. MD 691 was extended from Antietam Creek into the city of Hagerstown as a divided highway by 1944. MD 691 was replaced by US 40 Alternate when the new highway between Hagerstown and Frederick was completed in 1948. This US 40 Alternate and what is now US 40 Alternate, which had been US 40 proper, swapped designations in 1952.

== MD 693 ==
Maryland Route 693
- Location: Waldorf
- Existed: c. 1950–1956

Maryland Route 693 was the designation for what is now Renner Road between its intersections with MD 5 near Waldorf in northern Charles County. The highway was originally constructed as a 14-foot-wide (4.3 m) gravel road in 1913 and became part of MD 5 in 1927. MD 5 was relocated through the area when that highway was reconstructed between Waldorf and Bryantown in 1938. The old road was designated MD 693 by 1950. MD 693 was removed from the state highway system in 1956.

== MD 696 ==
Maryland Route 696
- Location: Princess Anne
- Existed: c. 1946–1954

Maryland Route 696 was the designation for Perryhawkin Road east from MD 388 near Princess Anne in northern Somerset County. The highway was built by 1946. MD 696 was removed from the state highway system in 1954.

== MD 697 (1938–1955) ==
Maryland Route 697
- Location: Princess Anne
- Existed: 1938–1955

Maryland Route 697 was the designation for Revells Neck Road from Millard Long Road east to US 13 near Princess Anne in central Somerset County. The highway was constructed in 1937 and 1938. MD 697 was removed from the state highway system in 1955. The portion of Revells Neck Road closest to US 13 became MD 640 in 1991.

== MD 697 (1969–1979) ==
Maryland Route 697
- Location: Bay View
- Length: 0.25 mi (400 m)
- Existed: 1969–1979

Maryland Route 697 was the designation for Old Farmington Road, which ran 0.25 miles (0.40 km) from MD 274 east to MD 699D (Old Bayview Road) in Bay View in central Cecil County. The route was created after MD 274 was relocated south to connect with another section of relocated MD 274 to tie directly into MD 272 in 1969. MD 697 was transferred from state to county maintenance through a December 27, 1979, road transfer agreement.

== MD 698 ==
Maryland Route 698
- Location: Chestertown
- Length: 0.11 mi (180 m)
- Existed: 1940–1985

Maryland Route 698 was the designation for Mill Street, which ran 0.11 miles (0.18 km) from High Street west to the east side of the railroad (now the Chestertown Rail Trail) in the town of Chestertown in central Kent County. Mill Street was surfaced with bituminous concrete in 1940 to better connect the state highway system with the Maryland State Roads Commission garage in Chestertown. MD 698 was resurfaced in 1975. The highway was transferred from state to municipal maintenance through an August 27, 1985, road transfer agreement.

== MD 699 ==
Maryland Route 699
- Location: Cecil County
- Existed: 1941–1979

Maryland Route 699 was the designation for sections of old alignment of and spurs related to MD 272 in central Cecil County. All sections of MD 699 except for MD 699 (no letter suffix) and MD 699B were transferred from state to local maintenance in a road transfer agreement on December 27, 1979. Of those highways transferred on that date, MD 699H and MD 699I were transferred to the town of North East; the remainder became county highways.

- MD 699 was the designation for what is now Nazarene Camp Road and South Leslie Road from MD 272 south of its bridge over the Baltimore & Ohio Railroad (now CSX's Philadelphia Subdivision) to a dead end at the railroad at the hamlet of Leslie north of North East. This 0.33-mile-long (0.53 km) route was created after the completion of MD 272's realignment and bridge over the railroad in 1941. MD 699 was transferred from state to county maintenance in a road transfer agreement on May 8, 1958.
- MD 699A was the designation for Walnut Garden Road, which ran 0.52 miles (0.84 km) from MD 273 north to MD 272 at Calvert. The route was created after the completion of MD 272's realignment at Calvert in 1958.
- MD 699B was the designation for the 0.55-mile-long (0.89 km) section of old MD 272 from MD 272 north to MD 273 at Calvert. The part of this roadway south of Brick Meetinghouse Road is now named Quaker Lane; the remainder no longer exists. The route was created after the completion of MD 272's realignment at Calvert in 1958. MD 699B was transferred from state to county maintenance in a road transfer agreement on February 25, 1976.
- MD 699C was the designation for Old Zion Road, which ran for 0.93 miles (1.50 km) between junctions with MD 272 on either side of the hamlet of Zion. The route was created after the completion of MD 272's realignment at Zion in 1959.
- MD 699D was the designation for Old Bayview Road, which ran 0.99 miles (1.59 km) from MD 272 at the I-95 interchange north through Bay View to MD 272 south of its bridge across North East Creek at Gilpins Falls. The route was created after the completion of MD 272's realignment through Bay View in 1961. MD 699D's southern terminus was the west leg of MD 272's intersection with the exit ramp from southbound I-95. The route headed west on newly constructed road to the old alignment of MD 272, then turned north to head into Bay View. The newly constructed roadway, now named Foster Lane, was disconnected from the I-95 exit ramp when the interchange was transformed from a diamond interchange to a partial cloverleaf interchange in 2000 and 2001.
- MD 699E was the designation for the 0.67-mile-long (1.08 km) section of old MD 272 from MD 272 just north of the Baltimore & Ohio Railroad crossing at Leslie to road end between Bethel Church Road and the I-95 interchange. The portion of this roadway north of Peninsula Drive is now named Marysville Road; the remainder no longer exists. The route was created after the completion of MD 272's realignment between Leslie and Bay View in 1961.
- MD 699F was the designation for North Leslie Road, which ran 0.30 miles (0.48 km) from a dead end at the Baltimore & Ohio Railroad at Leslie north to MD 699E north of Peninsula Drive. This section of old MD 272 was bypassed when the highway's bridge across the railroad was completed in 1941, but the route was created after MD 699E itself was bypassed in 1961.
- MD 699G was the designation for Rogers Road, which ran 0.31 miles (0.50 km) from US 40 north to MD 272 in North East. The route was created after the completion of MD 272's realignment and bridge over the Pennsylvania Railroad (now Amtrak's Northeast Corridor) in 1956.
- MD 699H was the designation for the 0.02-mile-long (0.032 km) section of North Main Street Extension from a dead end at the Pennsylvania Railroad north to the northern town limit of North East. The route was created after the completion of MD 272's realignment and bridge over the Pennsylvania Railroad in 1956. The 0.20-mile-long (0.32 km) portion of North Main Street Extension from the town limit north to US 40 was never part of MD 699H; instead, that section of old MD 272 was transferred from state to county maintenance in a May 8, 1958, road transfer agreement.
- MD 699I was the designation for North Main Street, which ran 0.14 miles (0.23 km) from the northbound direction of MD 272, Mauldin Avenue, to a dead end at the Pennsylvania Railroad in the town of North East. The route was created after the completion of MD 272's realignment and bridge over the Pennsylvania Railroad in 1956.
- MD 699J was the designation for the 1.76-mile-long (2.83 km) section of Hance Point Road between junctions with MD 272 south of North East. The route was created after the completion of MD 272's realignment between Elk Neck and North East in 1958.
- MD 699K was the designation for Old Log Cabin Road, which ran 0.55 miles (0.89 km) from MD 272 to a dead end north of McKinneytown Road between Elk Neck and North East. The route was created after the completion of MD 272's realignment between Elk Neck and North East in 1958.
- MD 699L was the designation for Arrants Road, which ran 0.60 miles (0.97 km) between junctions with MD 272 south of Red Point Road near Elk Neck. The route was created after the completion of MD 272's realignment between Elk Neck and North East in 1958.
- MD 699M was the designation for the 0.13-mile-long (0.21 km) section of Old Bayview Road from Bailiff Road on the north side of the I-95 interchange north to MD 699D, which went east along Foster Lane and north along Old Bayview Road. The route was created after the completion of MD 272's realignment through Bay View in 1961.
- MD 699N was the designation for the 0.01-mile-long (0.016 km) spur between MD 699E and MD 699F at their junction at Leslie. This spur was constructed when what became MD 699F was bypassed by what became MD 699E in 1941, but the route was created after MD 699E itself was bypassed by present-day MD 272 in 1961.
- MD 699O was the designation for a 0.09-mile-long (0.14 km) spur between MD 272 and MD 699J (Hance Point Road) at the latter highway's northern junction south of North East. The route was created after the completion of MD 272's realignment between Elk Neck and North East in 1958.
