= Maryland Route 832 =

State highway in Maryland, United States

Maryland Route 832
- Old Taneytown Road
- Maryland Route 832 highlighted in red

Route information
- Maintained by MDSHA
- Length: 7.67 mi (12.34 km)
- Existed: 1978–present
- Tourist routes: Old Main Streets Scenic Byway; Mason and Dixon Scenic Byway

Major junctions
- West end: MD 140 in Taneytown
- MD 84 near Frizzelburg
- East end: MD 140 near Westminster

Location
- Country: United States
- State: Maryland
- Counties: Carroll

Highway system
- Maryland highway system; Interstate; US; State; Scenic Byways
← MD 831	→ MD 833

Maryland Route 832 (MD 832) is a state highway in the U.S. state of Maryland. Known as Old Taneytown Road, the state highway runs 7.67 miles (12.34 km) from MD 140 near Taneytown east to MD 140 near Westminster. MD 832 is the old alignment of the highway now designated MD 140 in western Carroll County. The state highway was constructed as one of the original state roads in the mid-1910s and became part of MD 32 in 1927. MD 32 was replaced by MD 97 in 1956. MD 97 was moved to a new alignment between Westminster and Taneytown in the mid-1960s; the old alignment became part of MD 32 again. MD 832 replaced MD 32 on the highway in 1978, one year before the parallel highway became MD 140.

== Route description ==
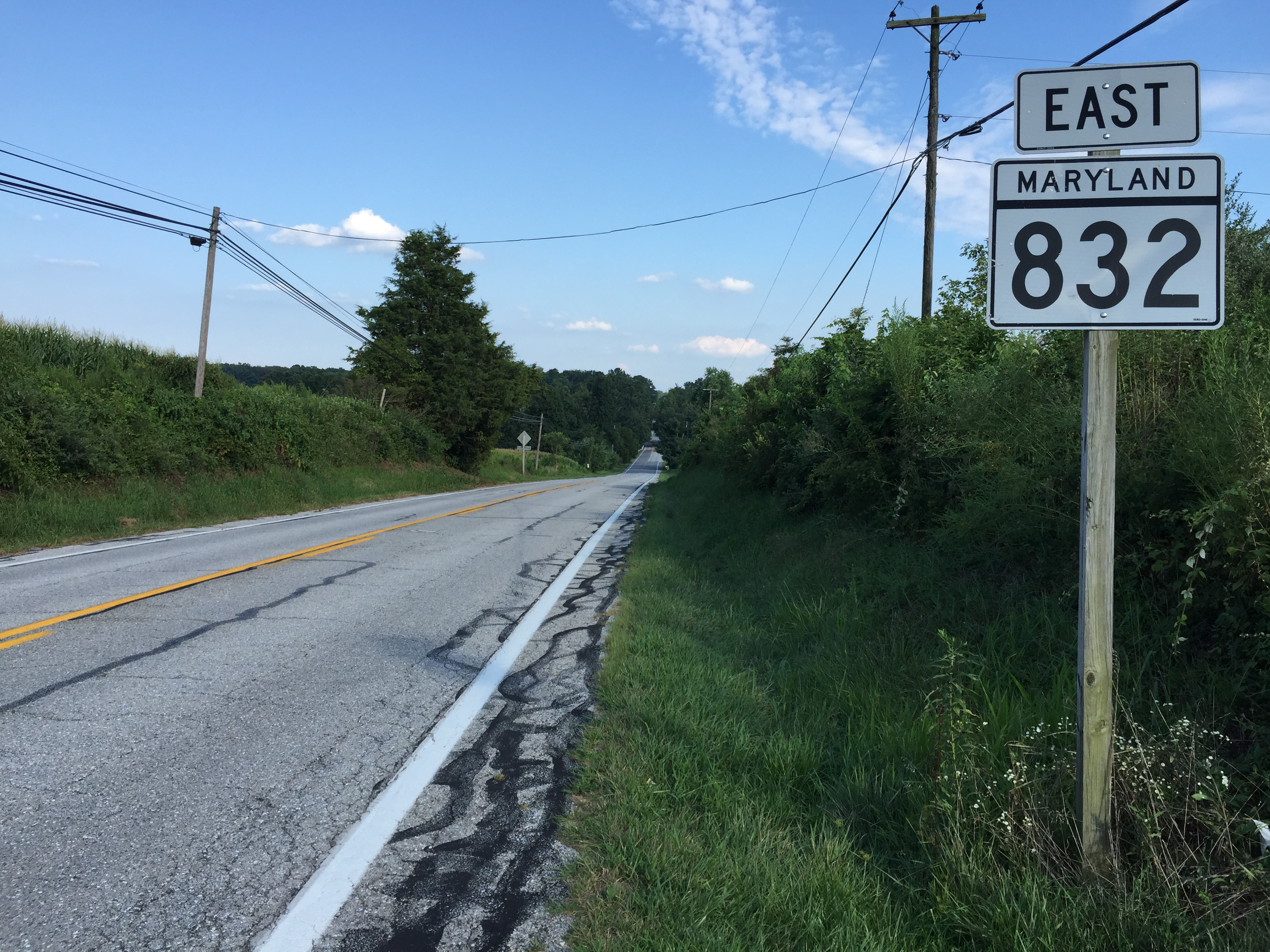
View east along MD 832 just east of Taneytown

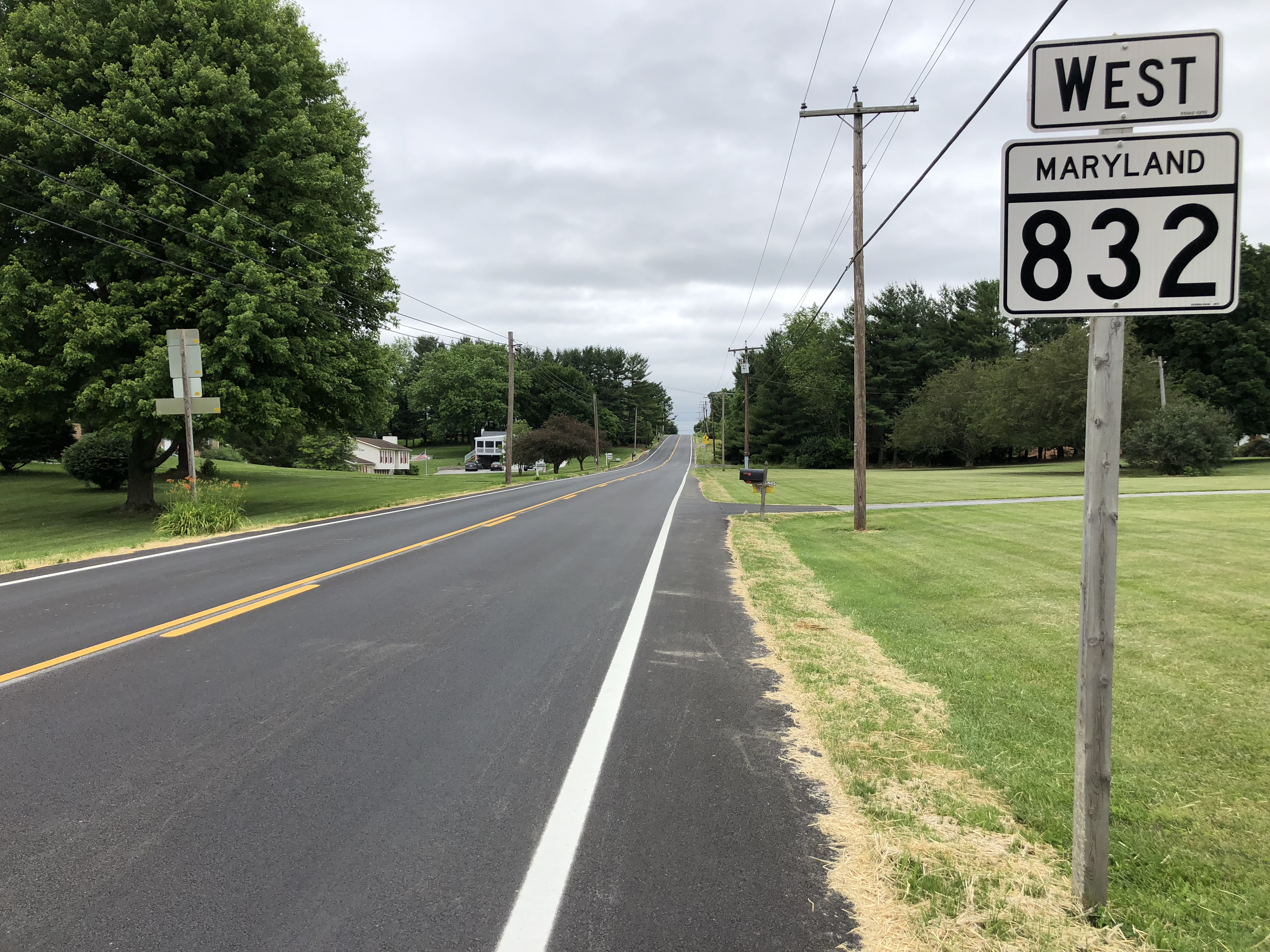
MD 832 westbound past MD 84 near Frizzelburg

MD 832 begins at the Taneytown Roundabout just east of Taneytown. MD 140 heads northwest from the roundabout as Baltimore Street and east as Taneytown Pike. The fourth leg of the roundabout is Antrim Boulevard, which heads southwest as a county highway. MD 832 heads southeast as a two-lane undivided road that passes through farmland and crosses Big Pipe Creek and Bear Branch. The state highway meets the northern end of MD 84 (Baust Church Road) and passes the eponymous church, Emmanuel Baust United Church of Christ, before heading through the hamlet of Tyrone. MD 832 continues through the village of Frizzelburg and the hamlet of Fountain Valley. The state highway closely parallels MD 140 (Taneytown Pike) for a short distance before MD 832 reaches its eastern terminus opposite Hughes Shop Road at Roop's Mill just west of Westminster.

== History ==
MD 832 is the old alignment of the highway now designated MD 140 from Taneytown to Westminster. The portion of the highway from Fountain Valley to its eastern terminus was originally part of the Westminster and Meadow Branch Turnpike. The remainder of the highway was the Taneytown Road. These two highways were designated for improvement as one of the original state roads by the Maryland State Roads Commission in 1909. Taneytown Road was reconstructed as a 14-foot (4.3 m) wide concrete road from Fountain Valley through Frizzelburg in 1914 and from Frizzelburg to Taneytown in 1915. The turnpike was resurfaced in macadam shortly after 1915. In 1927, the Taneytown–Westminster highway became one of the original state-numbered highways when it was designated part of MD 32, which originally ran from West Friendship in Howard County to Emmitsburg via Eldersburg, Westminster, and Taneytown. MD 32 was widened to 20 feet (6.1 m) from Westminster to just east of Taneytown around 1930.

In 1956, MD 97 was extended north from Howard County to Westminster, then assumed MD 32 northwest from there to Emmitsburg. Construction on the new alignment of MD 97 from east of Fountain Valley to east of Taneytown began by 1964 and was completed in 1965. The old alignment of MD 97 became a disjoint section of MD 32. Old Taneytown Road's designation was changed to MD 832 in 1978. The following year, U.S. Route 140 (US 140) was decommissioned from Baltimore to Gettysburg. US 140 from Baltimore to Westminster became part of MD 140, which was extended west of Westminster along what had been MD 97 through Emmitsburg. MD 97 was moved to US 140's old route north of Westminster toward Gettysburg. The Taneytown Roundabout at MD 832's western terminus was constructed in 1996.

== Junction list ==
The entire route is in Carroll County.

Location	mi	km	Destinations	Notes
Taneytown	0.00	0.00	MD 140 (Taneytown Pike/Baltimore Street) / Antrim Boulevard west – Emmitsburg	Taneytown Roundabout; western terminus
Frizzelburg	3.13	5.04	MD 84 south (Baust Church Road) – Uniontown, New Windsor	Northern terminus of MD 84
Westminster	7.67	12.34	MD 140 (Taneytown Pike) / Hughes Shop Road north – Reisterstown	Eastern terminus
1.000 mi = 1.609 km; 1.000 km = 0.621 mi

== See also ==
- List of roads in Carroll County, Maryland
