= List of highways numbered 699 =

The following highways are numbered 699:

== Canada ==
- Highway 699

== United States ==
- SR 699
- KY 699
- LA 699
- MD 699 (former)
- PA 699
- PR-699
- FM 699
- SR 699

Preceded by 698	Lists of highways 699	Succeeded by 700
