= Louisa May Alcott Elementary School =

Louisa May Alcott Elementary School may refer to:

- Louisa May Alcott School, Maryland, United States
- Louisa May Alcott Elementary School, Texas, United States — List of Houston Independent School District elementary schools
- Louisa May Alcott Elementary School, Washington, United States — Lake Washington School District
