= List of highways numbered 696 =

The following highways are numbered 696:

== United States ==
- I-696
- LA 696
- MD 696 (former)
- SR 696
- PA 696
- PR-696
- FM 696

Preceded by 695	Lists of highways 696	Succeeded by 697
