= List of highways numbered 697 =

The following highways are numbered 697:

== United States ==
- LA 697
- MD 697 (former)
- PR-697
- FM 697

Preceded by 696	Lists of highways 697	Succeeded by 698
