= List of highways numbered 698 =

The following highways are numbered 698:

== Canada ==
- Highway 698

== United States ==
- MD 698 (former)
- SR 698
- PR-698
- FM 698
- SR 698

| Preceded by 697 | Lists of highways 698 | Succeeded by 699 |
