= List of highways numbered 700 =

The following highways are numbered 700:

== Canada ==
- Saskatchewan Highway 700

== Costa Rica ==
- National Route 700

== Cuba ==
- San Jose–Menocal Road (2–700)

== Korea, South ==
- Daegu Ring Expressway

== United States ==
- SR 700
- KY 700
- MD 700
- Route 700 (unsigned designation for the southern portion of the New Jersey Turnpike)
- NC 700
- SR 700
- SC 700

Preceded by 699	Lists of highways 700	Succeeded by 701
