= Bullfrog Road Bridge =

- U.S. National Register of Historic Places
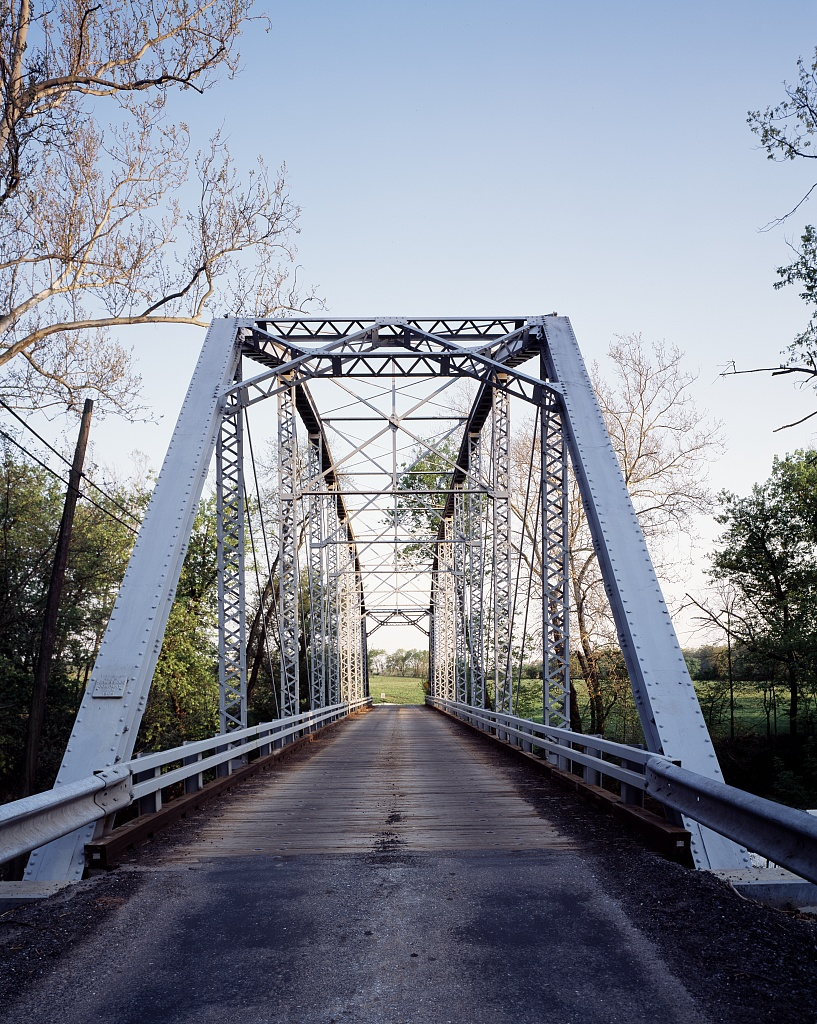

- Location within Maryland Location within the United States
- Nearest city: Taneytown, Maryland
- Coordinates: 39°41′44″N 77°14′25″W
- Area: less than one acre
- Built: 1908
- Built by: York Bridge Co.
- Architectural style: Parker truss
- NRHP reference No.: 78001461
- Added to NRHP: November 21, 1978

The Bullfrog Road Bridge is a historic bridge between Emmitsburg, Frederick County and Taneytown, Carroll County in Maryland. The bridge crosses the Monocacy River on Bullfrog Road between the two counties. The bridge is a steel Parker through truss structure and is 183 feet in length and 16 feet-5 inches in width. It was built in 1908, by the York Bridge Company of York, Pennsylvania.

The Bullfrog Road Bridge was listed on the National Register of Historic Places in 1978.
