= Meadow Brook Farm (Westminster, Maryland) =

- U.S. National Register of Historic Places
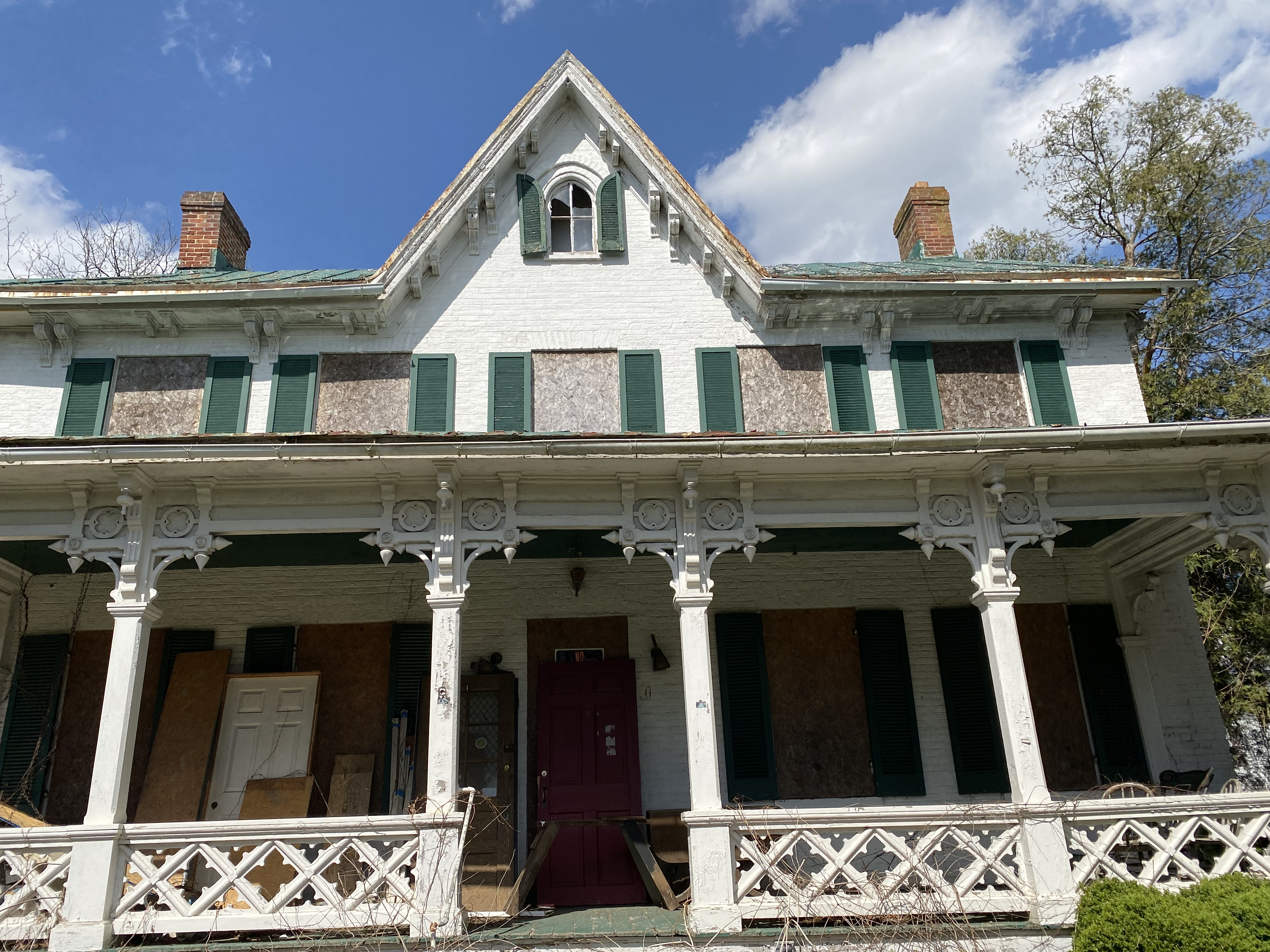

- Location within Maryland Location within the United States
- Location: 1006 Taneytown Pike (MD 140), Westminster, Maryland
- Coordinates: 39°35′31″N 77°1′52″W
- Area: 18 acres (7.3 ha)
- Built: 1805
- Architectural style: Gothic
- NRHP reference No.: 85001622
- Added to NRHP: July 25, 1985

Meadow Brook Farm, also known as the John Roop Farm or Samuel Roop Farm, is a historic home and farm complex located at Westminster, Carroll County, Maryland. The complex consists of the Victorian farmhouse and several period outbuildings including an 1809 two-story brick washhouse, brick smokehouse, brick privy, and brick tenant house. The house is a two-story brick structure that was built in the Pennsylvania German style about 1805. It has the typical gable roof, symmetrical façade, and L-shaped plan In 1868, the exterior and interior were remodeled to contemporary rural Victorian standards. The house was built during a period of significant immigration of Pennsylvania Germans into Maryland.

It was listed on the National Register of Historic Places in 1985.

In mid December 2016 the house was vandalized causing an estimated $100,000 worth of damage.
