= Westminster Historic District =

Historic district in Maryland, United States

- U.S. National Register of Historic Places
- U.S. Historic district
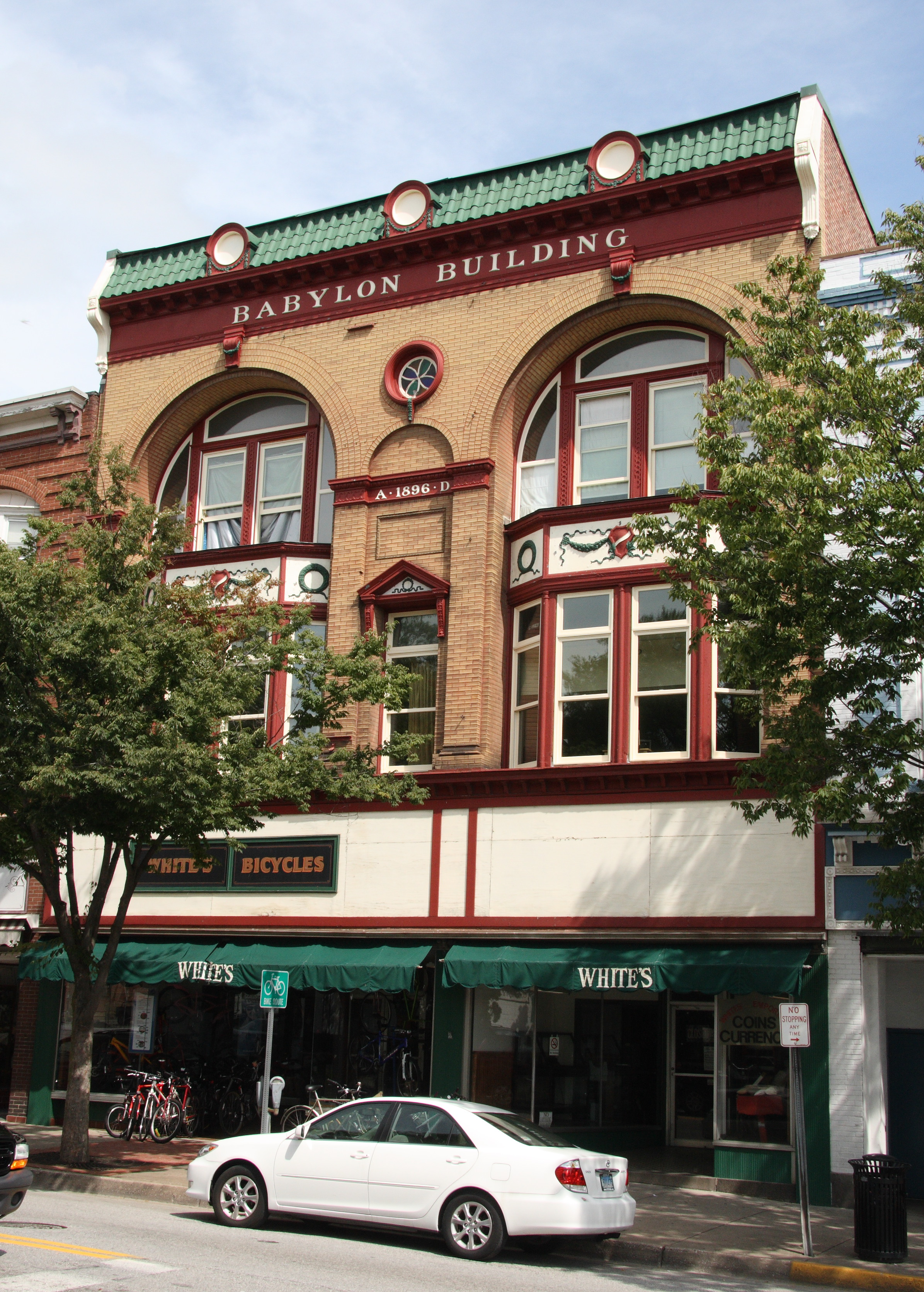

- Location within Maryland Location within the United States
- Location: MD 32 and MD 97, Westminster, Maryland
- Coordinates: 39°34′30″N 76°59′43″W
- Area: 235 acres (95 ha)
- Architect: Winchester, William
- Architectural style: Greek Revival, Georgian, Gothic Revival
- NRHP reference No.: 80001804
- Added to NRHP: August 6, 1980

The Westminster Historic District comprises the historic center of Westminster, Maryland. The district includes about 1400 structures, with a high proportion of contributing structures. The town exhibits a variety of building styles and notable examples of Greek Revival, Georgian, and Gothic Revival style architecture. Most of the structures exhibit early 19th-century residential vernacular architecture and mid-19th century commercial architecture.

It was listed on the National Register of Historic Places in 1980.
