= American Corner, Maryland =

Unincorporated community in Maryland, United States

- Populated place
- Location within Maryland Location within the United States
- Coordinates: 38°46′02″N 75°49′09″W
- Country: United States
- State: Maryland
- County: Caroline
- Elevation: 52 ft (16 m)
- GNIS feature ID: 589641

American Corner is a populated place in Caroline County, Maryland, United States. American Corner is home to Colonel Richardson High School and Colonel Richardson Middle School. On older maps, it is sometimes referred to as American Corners. There was formerly a post office, cannery, blacksmith, and a store located there, as seen on the 1875 and 1897 Maps of Caroline County, Maryland.
