= Broadfording, Maryland =

Unincorporated community in Maryland, U.S.

Coordinates: 39°41′09″N 77°48′10″W

Broadfording is an unincorporated community in Washington County, Maryland, United States.
