= New Midway, Maryland =

Unincorporated community in Maryland, United States

- Unincorporated community
- Location in Maryland New Midway (the United States)
- Coordinates: 39°34′01″N 77°17′27″W
- Country: United States of America
- State: Maryland
- County: Frederick
- Elevation: 476 ft (145 m)
- GNIS feature ID: 590874

New Midway is an unincorporated community in Frederick County, Maryland, United States.
