= Hack's Point, Maryland =

Unincorporated community in Maryland, United States

- Unincorporated community
- Location within the State of Maryland Hack's Point (the United States)
- Coordinates: 39°27′47″N 75°52′52″W
- Country: United States
- State: Maryland
- County: Cecil
- Time zone: UTC-5 (Eastern (EST))
  - Summer (DST): UTC-4 (EDT)

Hack's Point is an unincorporated community in Cecil County, Maryland, United States.

During the 20th century, Hacks Point became a summer community with many seasonal homes, but this attractively situated place on the Bohemia River goes back to the earliest days of the colony. Stephen Hack was granted the first patent in 1658 and the name for this place was carried down through time. A ferry provided a means to cross the river here until 1867, when a bridge was built.

As the automobile started providing greater mobility in the 20th century, residents from nearby urban areas in Pennsylvania and Delaware found this to be a fine spot for fishing, bathing and boating and by 1940 its role as a summer community was fully established. After World War I, more developments were platted on the shore of the Bohemia River.

Today, many of the buildings are still seasonal vacation homes.
