= Taneytown Historic District =

Historic district in Maryland, United States

- U.S. National Register of Historic Places
- U.S. Historic district
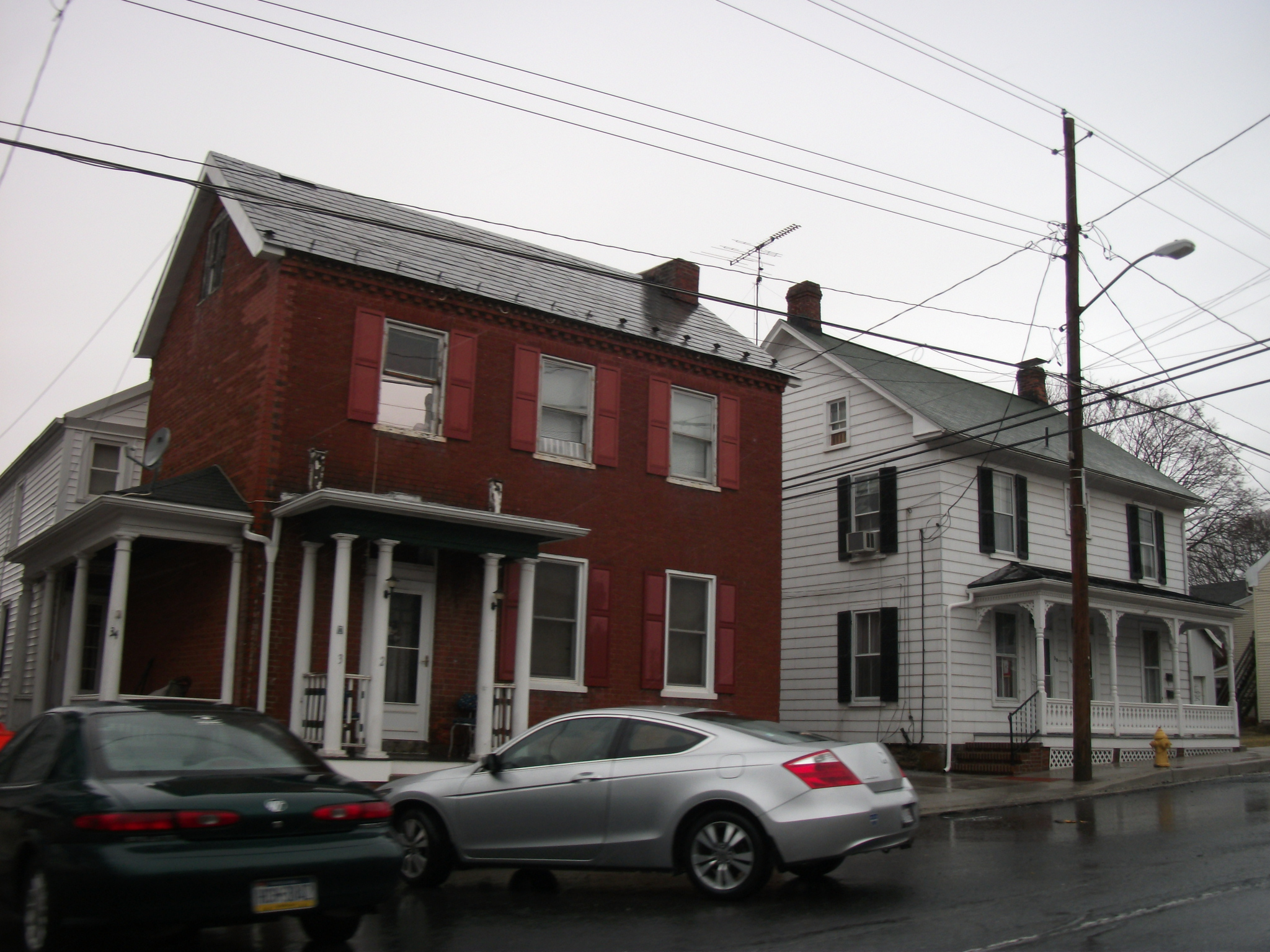
- Taneytown Historic District, March 2011

- Location within Maryland Location within the United States
- Location: MD 140 and 194, Taneytown, Maryland
- Coordinates: 39°39′30″N 77°10′26″W
- Area: 210 acres (85 ha)
- Built: 1762
- Architect: Eckenrode, T.H.; Et al.
- Architectural style: Bungalow/craftsman, Late Victorian, Foursquare;Log cabin style
- NRHP reference No.: 86002850
- Added to NRHP: October 9, 1986

Taneytown Historic District (/ˈtɔːnitaʊn/ TAW-nee-town) is a national historic district at Taneytown, Carroll County, Maryland, United States. The district comprises a cohesive group of houses, churches, commercial buildings and industrial structures reflecting the development of this crossroads town from its initial platting in 1762 through the early 20th century.

It was added to the National Register of Historic Places in 1986.
