= Owings Upper Mill =

- U.S. National Register of Historic Places
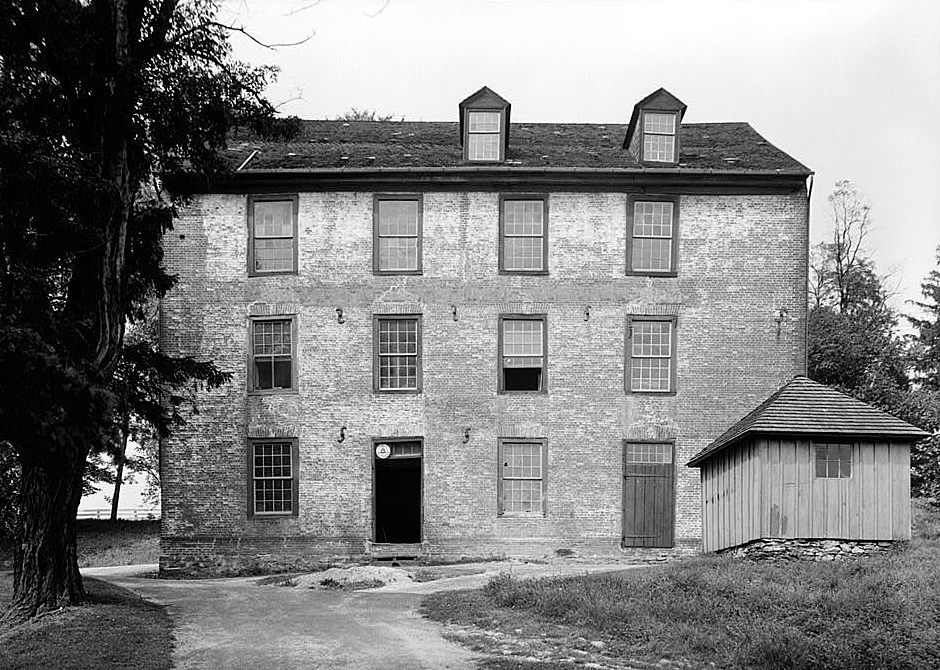
- Owings Mill in 1936

- Location within Maryland Location within the United States
- Location: 10601 Reisterstown Road (MD 140); Owings Mills, Maryland, U.S.
- Coordinates: 39°25′18.9696″N 76°46′59.304″W
- Area: 8.9 acres (3.6 ha)
- Built: 1791
- Architect: Owings, Samuel
- Architectural style: Early Republic
- NRHP reference No.: 78001446
- Added to NRHP: September 13, 1978

The Owings Upper Mill (also known as A.E. Groff's Flour Mill) is a historic grist mill located at Owings Mills, Baltimore County, Maryland, United States. It is a large 3 1/2-story brick structure, 50 by 60 feet (15 by 18 m). The building stands on a low stone foundation, surmounted by a molded brick water table. Two frame extensions were built sometime in the 1880s. The words "EUREKA FLOUR MILL" are worked into the façade in purple brick between the second- and third-story windows. The building is probably the oldest and largest mill surviving in Baltimore County and was the last known project of Samuel Owings, the American Revolutionary War patriot and enterprising merchant.

The Owings Upper Mill was listed on the National Register of Historic Places in 1978.
