= Bellegrove, Maryland =

Unincorporated community in Maryland, United States

- Unincorporated community
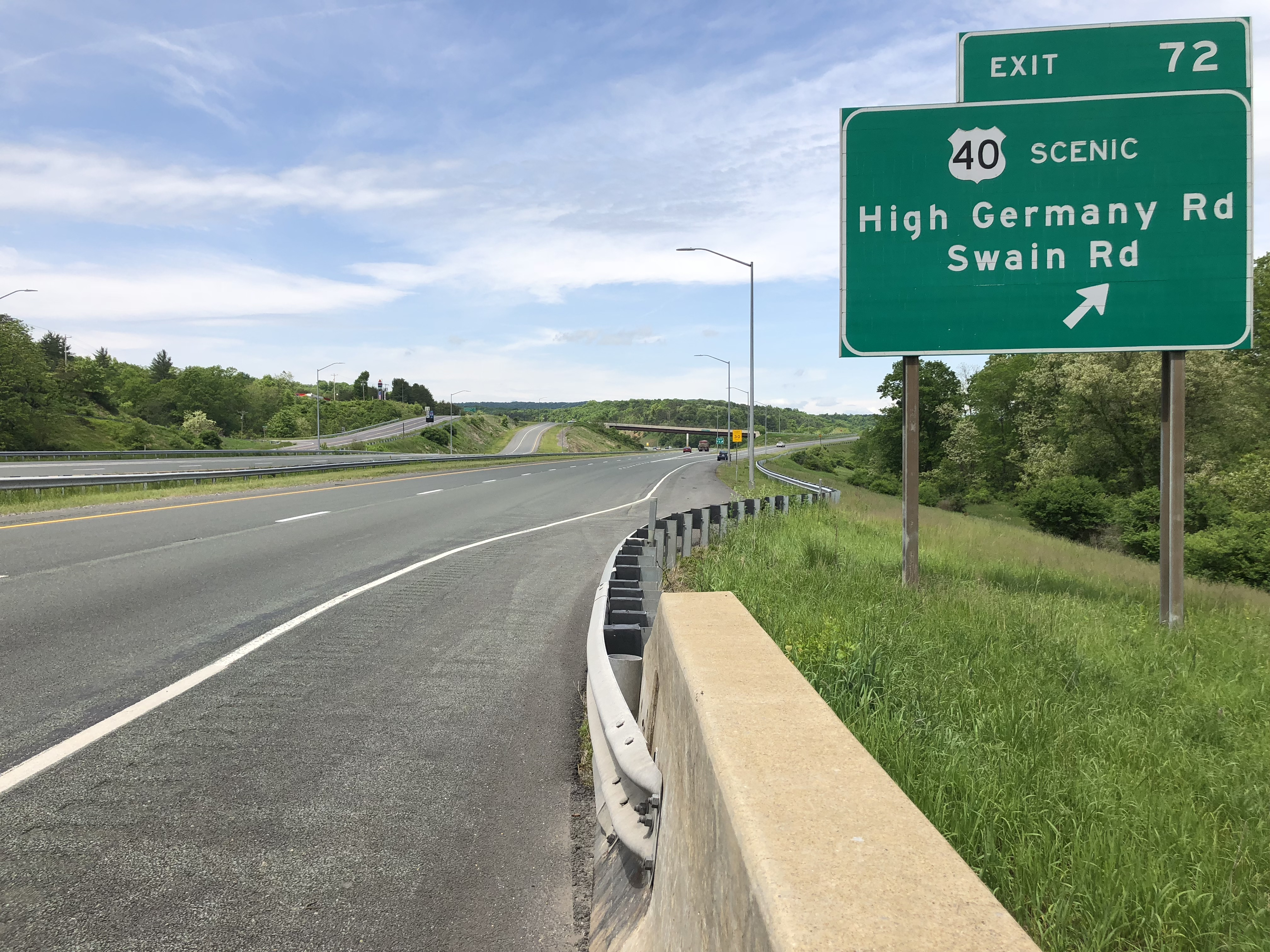
- I-68/US 40 in Bellegrove

- Location within the State of Maryland Bellegrove, Maryland (the United States)
- Coordinates: 39°42′24″N 78°20′17″W
- Country: United States
- State: Maryland
- County: Allegany
- Elevation: 692 ft (211 m)
- Time zone: UTC−5 (Eastern (EST))
  - Summer (DST): UTC−4 (EDT)
- GNIS feature ID: 589727

Bellegrove is an unincorporated community in Allegany County, Maryland, United States. The Old National Pike Milestones were listed on the National Register of Historic Places in 1975.
