= Roop's Mill =

- U.S. National Register of Historic Places
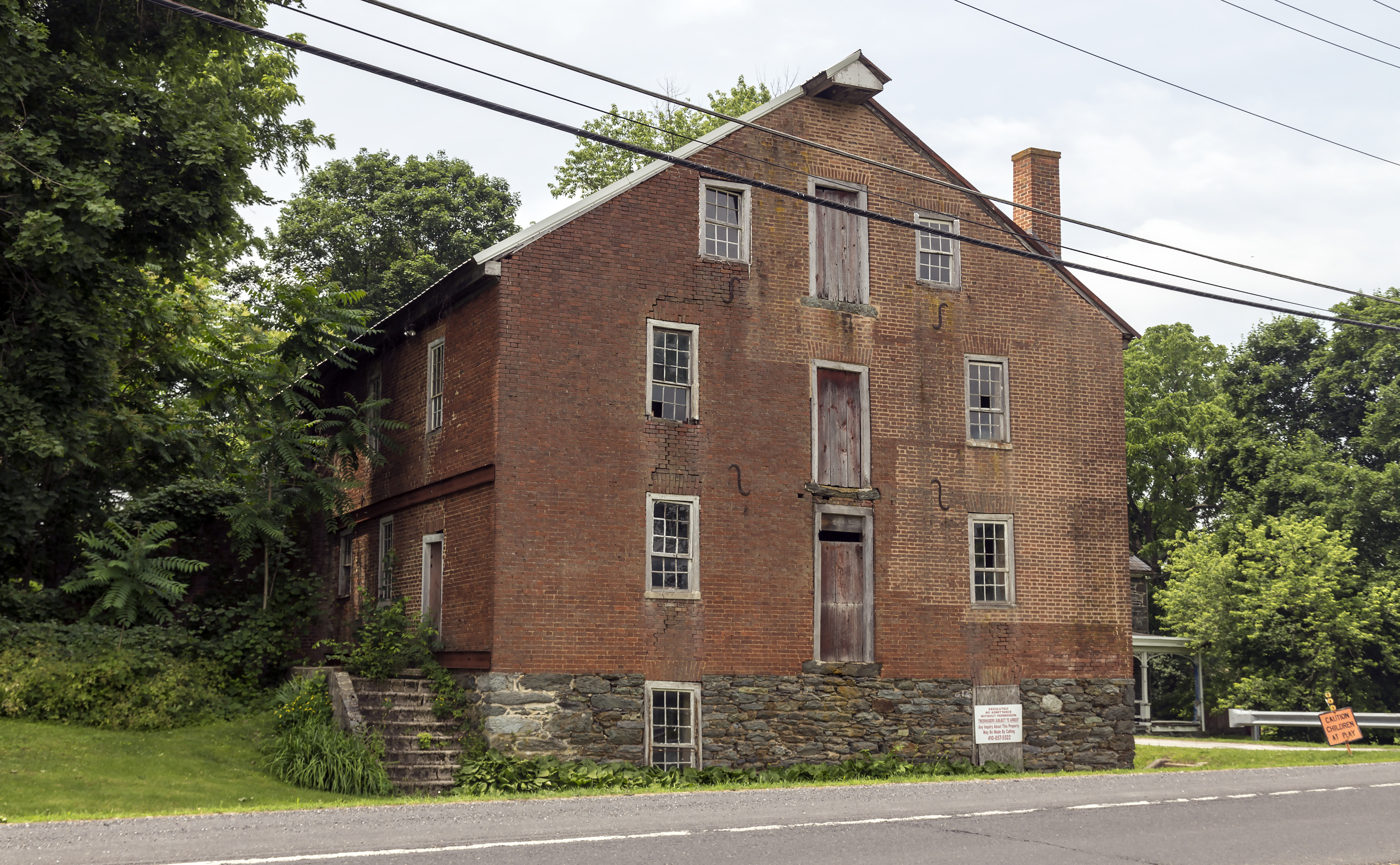
- Roop's Mill in 2015

- Location within Maryland Location within the United States
- Location: 1001 & 1019 Taneytown Pike, near Westminster, Maryland
- Coordinates: 39°35′35″N 77°02′02″W
- Area: 11 acres (4.5 ha)
- Built: c. 1795, 1816, 1825, 1869, 1914
- Architectural style: Federal, Mid-19th century
- NRHP reference No.: 08000796
- Added to NRHP: October 31, 2008

Roop's Mill is a historic grist mill complex located near Westminster, Carroll County, Maryland. The complex includes a three-story, brick and stone mill, dating from about 1795 and rebuilt in 1816; the David Roop House, an 1825 stone dwelling; a log cooper's shed; an early two-part bank barn; numerous farm sheds; a late-19th century iron suspension bridge; and a bank barn dated to the 1860s. The brick mill was constructed according to the designs of Oliver Evans.

It was listed on the National Register of Historic Places in 2008.
