= Louisa May Alcott School =

Historic school building in Maryland, USA

- U.S. National Register of Historic Places
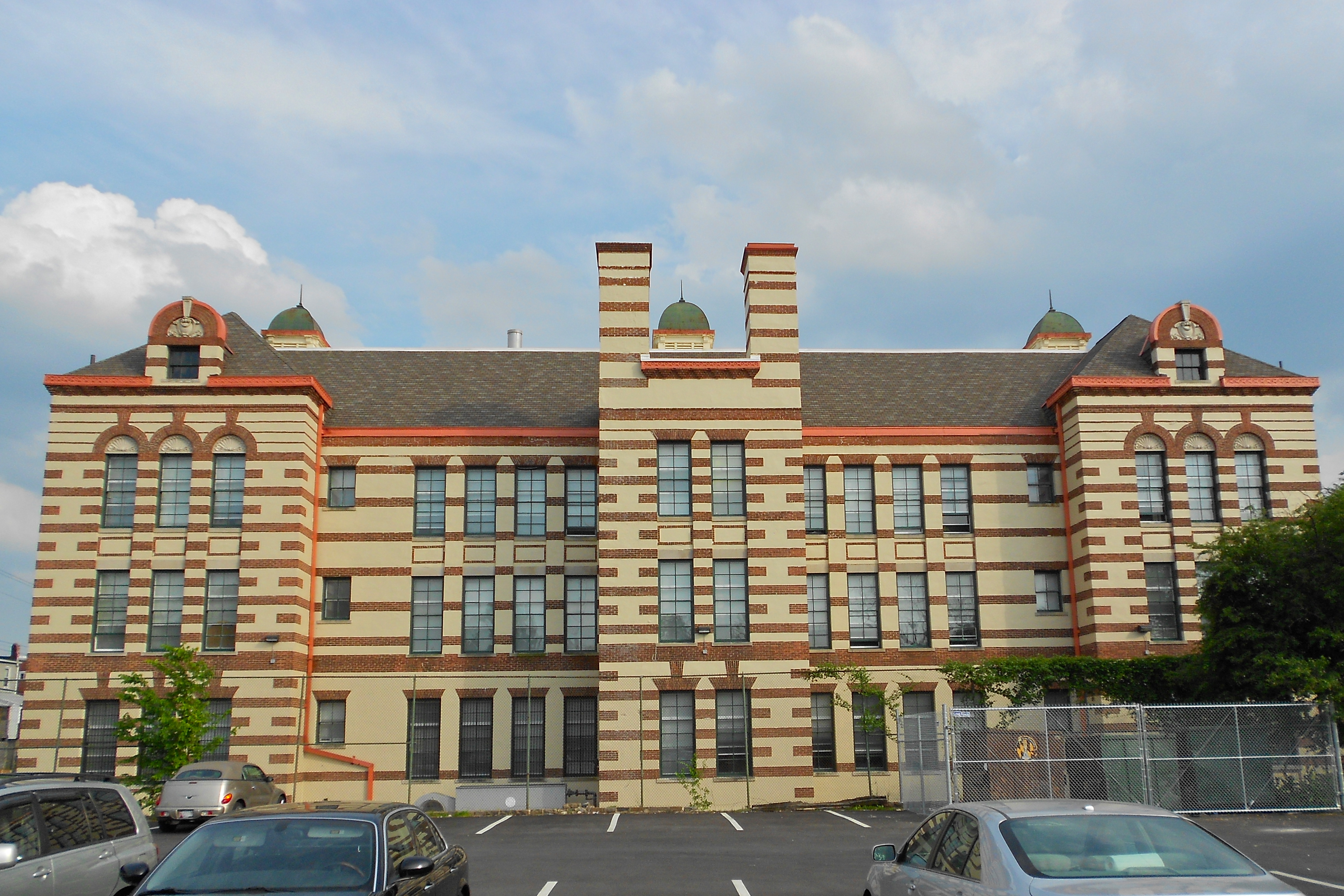

- Location within Baltimore Location within Maryland Location within the United States
- Location: 2702 Keyworth Ave., Baltimore, Maryland
- Coordinates: 39°19′59″N 76°39′46″W
- Area: 0.5 acres (0.20 ha)
- Built: 1907
- Architect: Simonson, Otto G.
- Architectural style: Colonial Revival
- NRHP reference No.: 90000544
- Added to NRHP: March 29, 1990

Louisa May Alcott School, also known as "School No. 59" and "Reisterstown Road School," is a historic elementary school located at Baltimore, Maryland, United States. It is a Colonial Revival or Georgian Revival structure completed in 1910. The freestanding building rises 3 ½ to 4 levels from brick base to metal cornice. It features symmetrically designed brick and stucco bands, decorative terra cotta, and three metal cupolas atop the hipped roof.

Louisa May Alcott School was listed on the National Register of Historic Places in 1990.
