= Taneytown, Maryland =

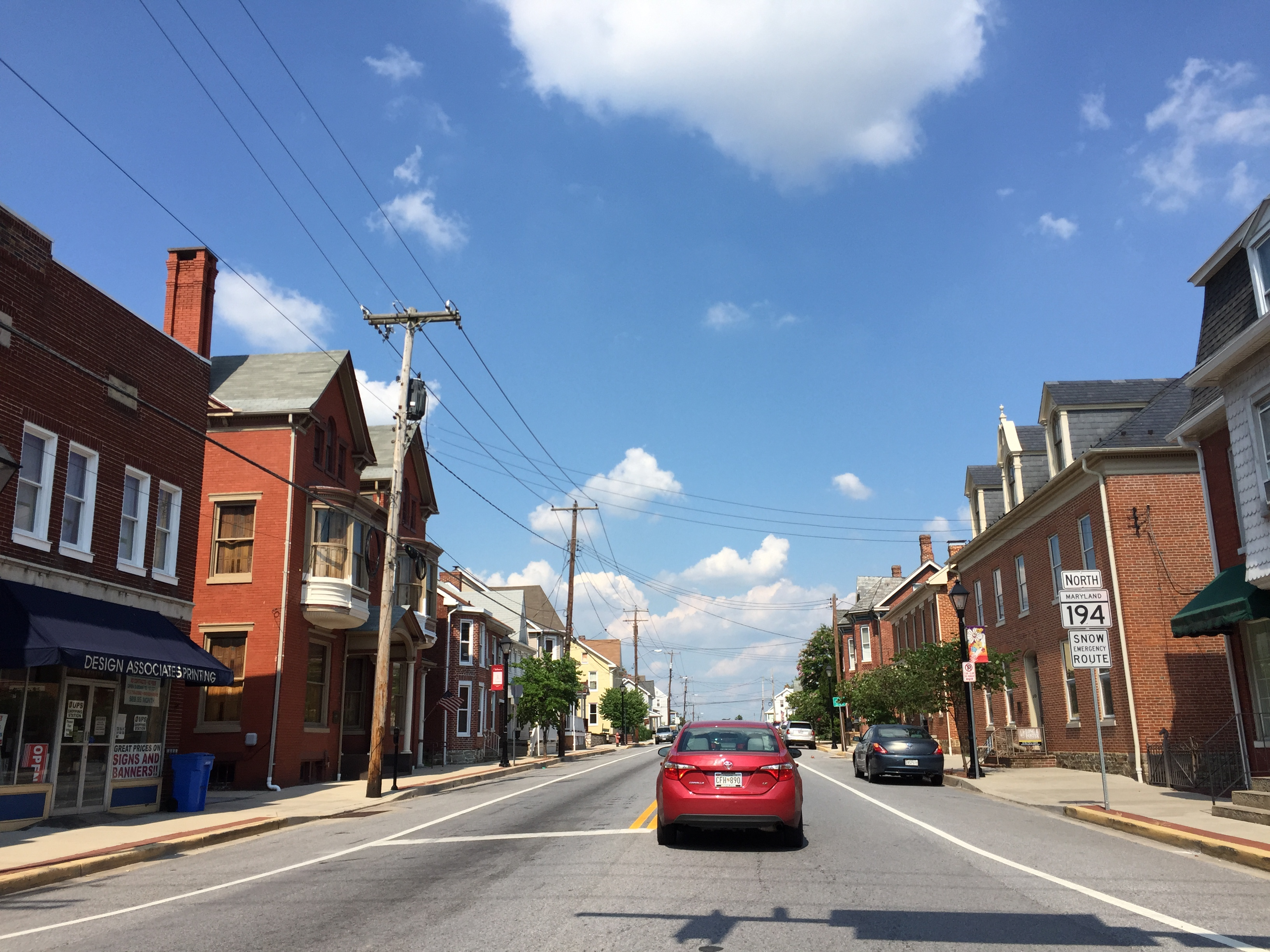
- Central Taneytown

- Flag Seal

- Location of Taneytown, Maryland
- Coordinates: 39°39′26″N 77°10′14″W
- Country: United States
- State: Maryland
- County: Carroll
- Incorporated: 1836

Government
  - Type: Strong mayor–council
  - Mayor: Christopher G. Miller
  - Mayor Pro Tem: Rachael R. Miller

Area
  - Total: 3.16 sq mi (8.19 km^{2})
  - Land: 3.16 sq mi (8.18 km^{2})
  - Water: 0.0077 sq mi (0.02 km^{2})
- Elevation: 505 ft (154 m)

Population (2020)
  - Total: 7,234
  - Density: 2,291.8/sq mi (884.88/km^{2})
- Time zone: UTC-5 (Eastern (EST))
  - Summer (DST): UTC-4 (EDT)
- ZIP code: 21787
- Area code: 410
- FIPS code: 24-76725
- GNIS feature ID: 0587687
- Website: www.taneytown.org

Taneytown (/ˈtɔːnitaʊn/ TAW-nee-town, locally also /ˈtænitaʊn/) is a city in Carroll County, Maryland, United States. The population was 7,234 at the 2020 census. Taneytown was founded in 1754. Of the city, George Washington once wrote, "Tan-nee town is but a small place with only the Street through wch.(sic) the road passes, built on. The buildings are principally of wood." Taneytown has a history museum that displays the history of the city for visitors and citizens to see. The Bullfrog Road Bridge was listed on the National Register of Historic Places in 1978.

== History ==
Taneytown was founded in 1754 and became the seat of Taneytown Hundred in colonial Frederick County. Taneytown takes its name from Raphael Taney, a recipient of one of the first land grants in the area, though Taney likely never lived in the city that bears his name. U.S. Supreme Court Justice Roger Brooke Taney, author of the Dred Scott decision, born in 1777, shares a common ancestor with him, but likely never visited the town or had any connection. When Carroll County was formed on January 19, 1837, Taneytown Hundred and Taneytown were included.

The community's proximity to Gettysburg, Pennsylvania, and its location on the principal road from Gettysburg to Washington, D.C., led to its figuring in the Battle of Gettysburg, although no combat occurred there.

Much of the city was added to the National Register of Historic Places as the Taneytown Historic District in 1986.

There is a Steve Earle song called "Taneytown" on his album El Corazon.

== Geography ==
Taneytown is located at 39°39′26″N 77°10′14″W (39.657099, -77.170627).

According to the United States Census Bureau, the city has a total area of 3.05 square miles (7.90 km^{2}), of which 3.04 square miles (7.87 km^{2}) is land and 0.01 square miles (0.03 km^{2}) is water.

== Demographics ==
Historical population
Census	Pop.	Note	%±
1850	285		—
1860	365		28.1%
1870	413		13.2%
1880	519		25.7%
1890	566		9.1%
1900	665		17.5%
1910	824		23.9%
1920	800		−2.9%
1930	938		17.3%
1940	1,208		28.8%
1950	1,420		17.5%
1960	1,519		7.0%
1970	1,731		14.0%
1980	2,618		51.2%
1990	3,695		41.1%
2000	5,128		38.8%
2010	6,728		31.2%
2020	7,234		7.5%
U.S. Decennial Census

=== 2020 census ===
As of the 2020 census, Taneytown had a population of 7,234. The median age was 38.3 years. 25.1% of residents were under the age of 18 and 19.2% of residents were 65 years of age or older. For every 100 females there were 89.3 males, and for every 100 females age 18 and over there were 87.0 males age 18 and over.

98.0% of residents lived in urban areas, while 2.0% lived in rural areas.

There were 2,689 households in Taneytown, of which 34.9% had children under the age of 18 living in them. Of all households, 51.5% were married-couple households, 14.0% were households with a male householder and no spouse or partner present, and 26.6% were households with a female householder and no spouse or partner present. About 23.6% of all households were made up of individuals and 12.4% had someone living alone who was 65 years of age or older.

There were 2,817 housing units, of which 4.5% were vacant. The homeowner vacancy rate was 0.9% and the rental vacancy rate was 7.6%.

Racial composition as of the 2020 census
Race	Number	Percent
White	6,042	83.5%
Black or African American	480	6.6%
American Indian and Alaska Native	19	0.3%
Asian	65	0.9%
Native Hawaiian and Other Pacific Islander	0	0.0%
Some other race	125	1.7%
Two or more races	503	7.0%
Hispanic or Latino (of any race)	297	4.1%

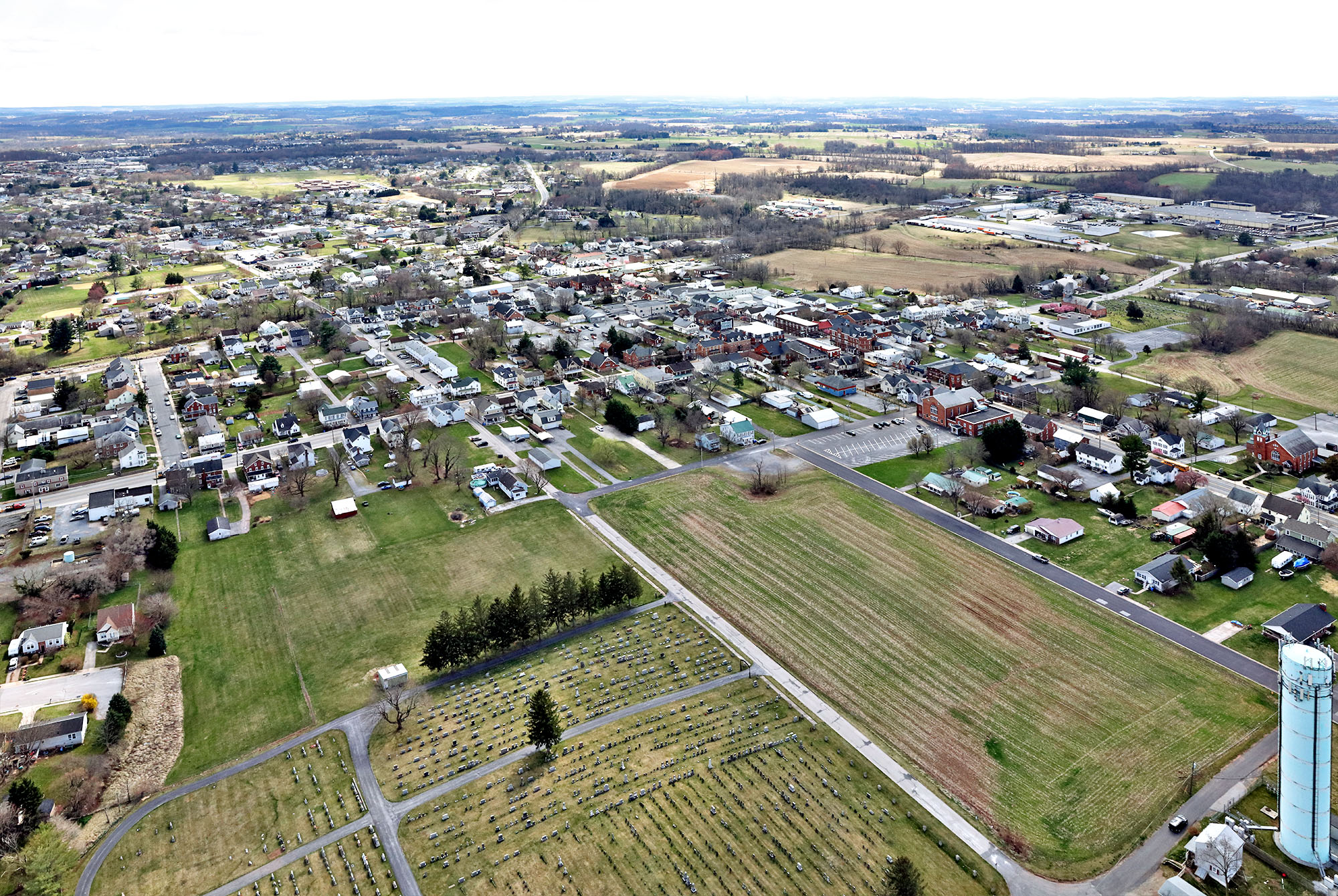
Aerial photograph of Taneytown

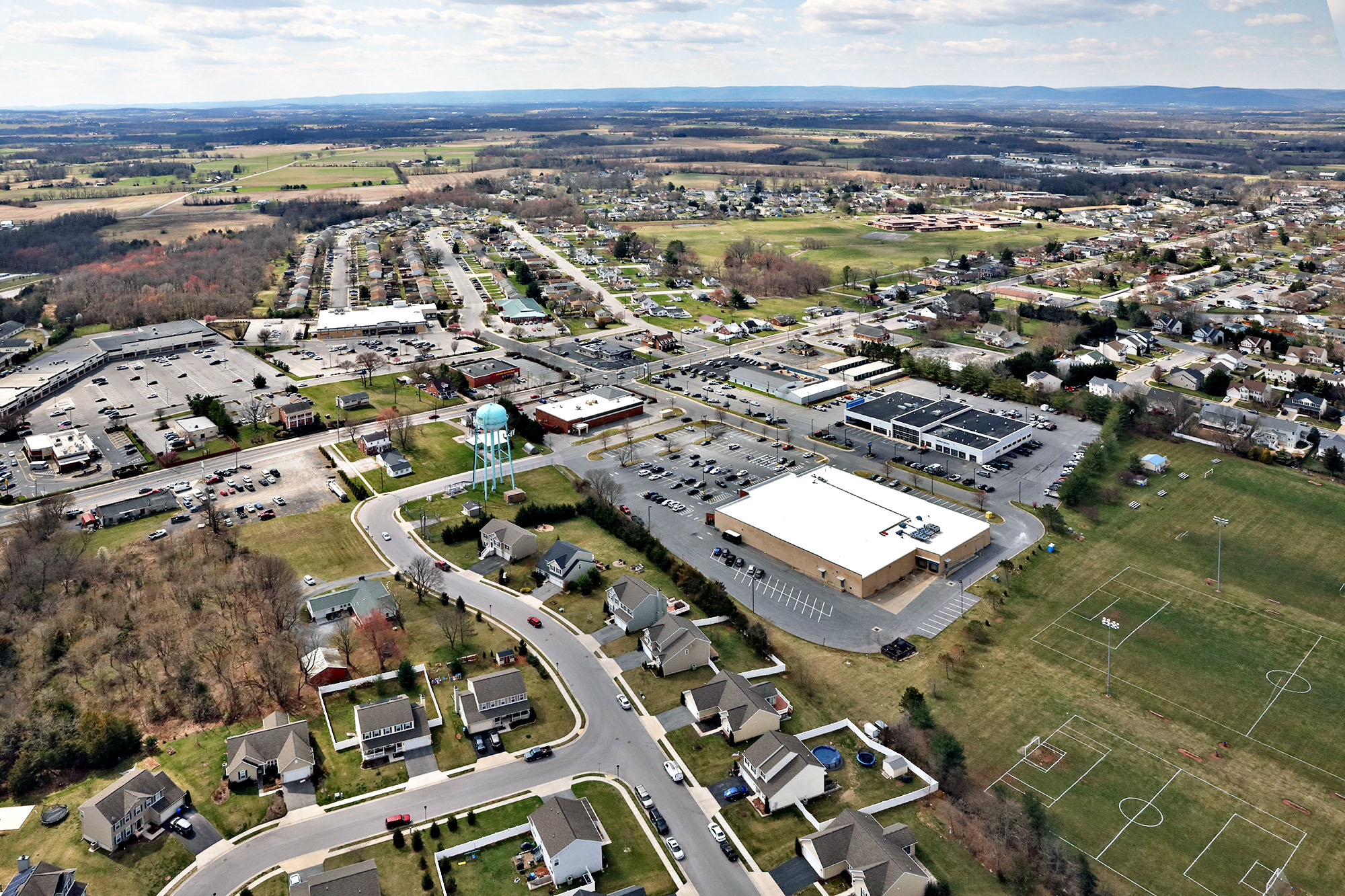
Aerial photograph of Taneytown

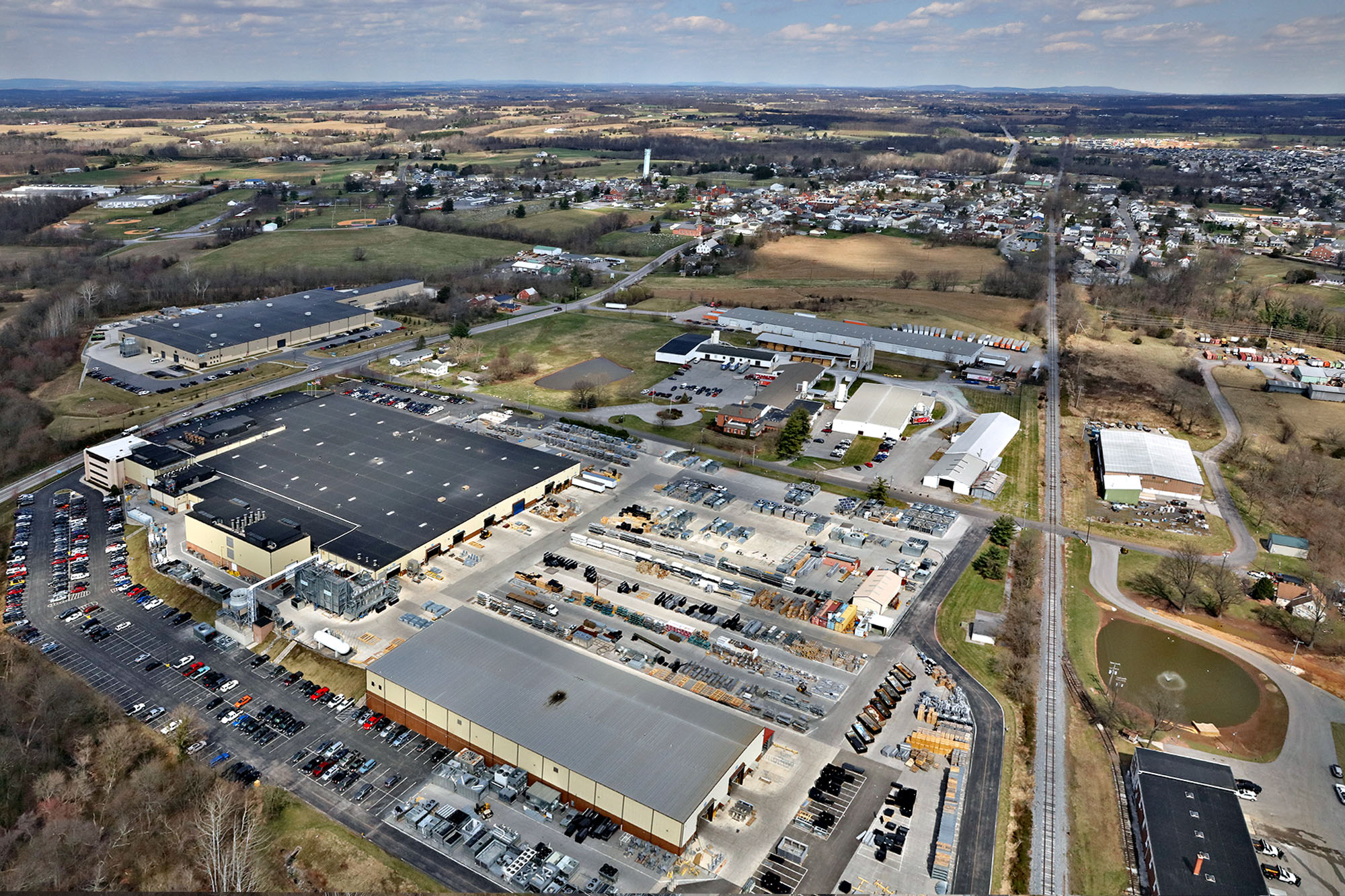
Evapco Plant in Taneytown

=== 2010 census ===
As of the census of 2010, there were 6,728 people, 2,434 households, and 1,813 families living in the city. The population density was 2,213.2 inhabitants per square mile (854.5/km^{2}). There were 2,554 housing units at an average density of 840.1 units per square mile (324.4 units/km^{2}). The racial makeup of the city was 91.3% White, 4.5% Black , 0.1% Native American, 0.7% Asian, 0.5% from other races, and 2.7% from two or more races. Hispanic or Latino of any race were 2.7% of the population.

There were 2,434 households, of which 40.5% had children under the age of 18 living with them, 55.3% were married couples living together, 14.7% had a female householder with no husband present, 4.4% had a male householder with no wife present, and 25.5% were non-families. 20.5% of all households were made up of individuals, and 8.9% had someone living alone who was 65 years of age or older. The average household size was 2.74 and the average family size was 3.14.

The median age in the city was 37 years. 27.9% of residents were under the age of 18; 8.3% were between the ages of 18 and 24; 26.2% were from 25 to 44; 24.3% were from 45 to 64; and 13.3% were 65 years of age or older. The gender makeup of the city was 47.5% male and 52.5% female.

=== 2000 census ===
As of the census of 2000, there were 5,128 people, 1,786 households, and 1,387 families living in the city. The population density was 1,781.1 inhabitants per square mile (687.7/km^{2}). There were 1,848 housing units at an average density of 641.9 units per square mile (247.8 units/km^{2}). The racial makeup of the city was 96.00% White, 1.74% Black, 0.16% Native American, 0.47% Asian, 0.62% from other races, and 1.01% from two or more races. Hispanic or Latino of any race were 1.50% of the population. 26% of Taneytown's residents were German, 14% Irish, 10% English, 5% Italian, 3% French, 2% Polish, 2% Dutch, and 2% Scottish. People of Scotch-Irish, Lithuanian, Russian, Mexican and Norwegian descent each comprised 1% of the population.

There were 1,786 households, out of which 47.9% had children under the age of 18 living with them, 56.1% were married couples living together, 15.6% had a female householder with no husband present, and 22.3% were non-families. 17.9% of all households were made up of individuals, and 7.1% had someone living alone who was 65 years of age or older. The average household size was 2.87 and the average family size was 3.22.

In the city the population was spread out, with 34.1% under the age of 18, 7.3% from 18 to 24, 35.4% from 25 to 44, 15.7% from 45 to 64, and 7.5% who were 65 years of age or older. The median age was 31 years. For every 100 females, there were 96.1 males. For every 100 females age 18 and over, there were 90.7 males.

The median income for a household in the city was $42,820, and the median income for a family was $49,615. Males had a median income of $31,862 versus $24,261 for females. The per capita income for the city was $16,258. About 9.0% of families and 11.5% of the population were below the poverty line, including 16.7% of those under age 18 and 10.0% of those age 65 or over.

== Government ==
=== 2023 Mayoral Election ===
In 2023, Christopher G. Miller won a three-way race for mayor against incumbent Bradley Wantz and Councilmember Daniel Haines. Miller was sworn in on May 8, 2023.

=== 2025 Council Turnover and Mayor Pro Tem ===
In the May 5, 2025 municipal election for three at-large council seats, newcomers Stephen “Nick” Kalinock, Harry Meade, and Rachael R. Miller were elected, replacing prior members and bringing several first-time officeholders to the council. Later in May 2025, the council selected Rachael R. Miller as Mayor Pro Tem.

== Transportation ==
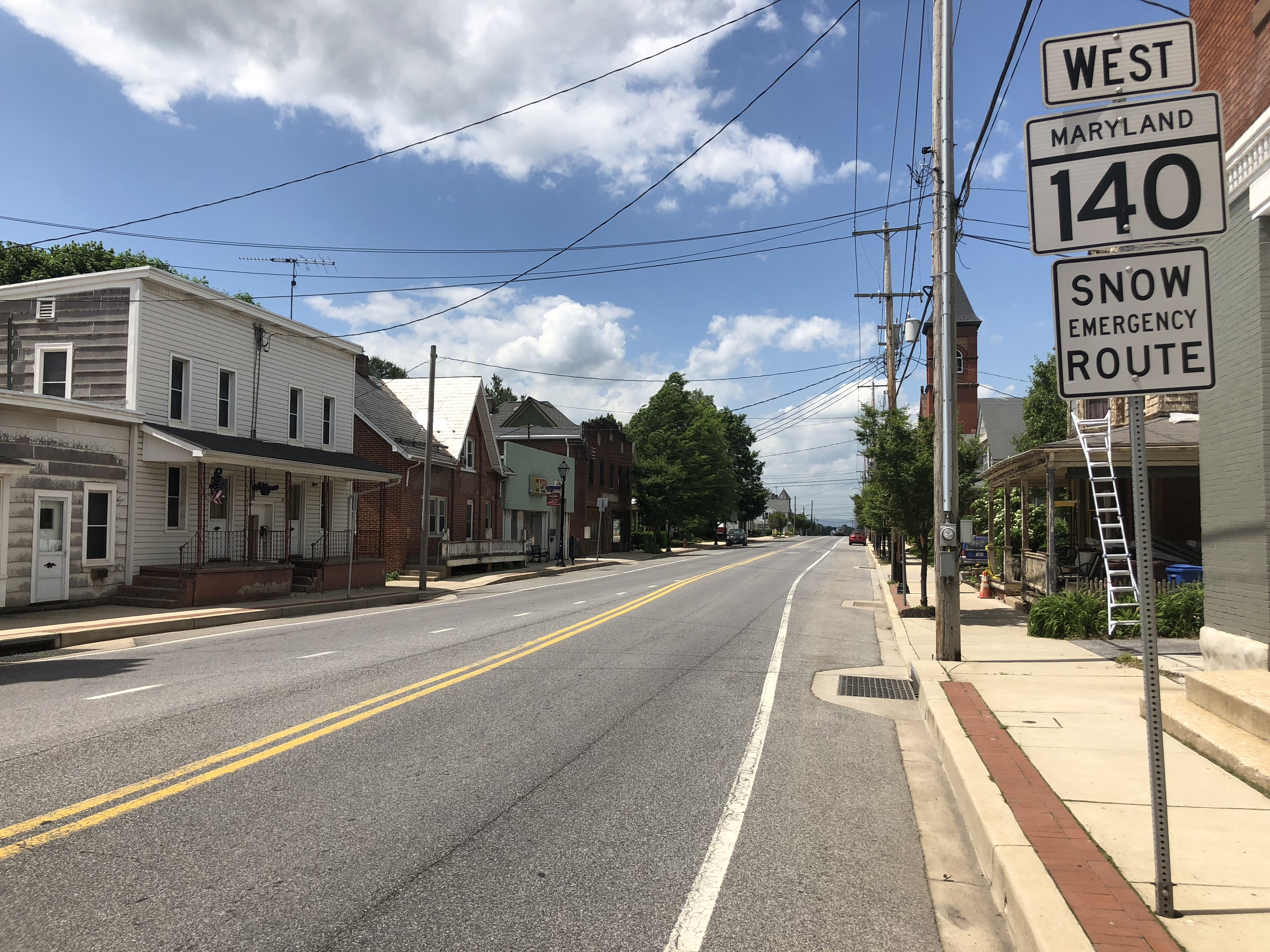
MD 140 westbound in central Taneytown

The primary means of travel to and from Taneytown is by road. Two primary highways serve the city, Maryland Route 140 and Maryland Route 194. MD 140 follows Baltimore Street through central Taneytown. From the city, MD 140 continues eastward to Westminster and Baltimore, while to the west it traverses Emmitsburg before entering Pennsylvania. MD 194 follows Frederick Street and York Street through the city. From Taneytown, MD 194 continues north to Pennsylvania, while heading south, it proceeds into the Frederick area.

== Notable people ==
Taneytown was home to Fr. Demetrius Augustine Gallitzin, Catholic priest, missionary, and Russian prince during the late 18th century.

Explorer Rogers Birnie was born in Taneytown in 1851. Shortly after his birth, his family moved to Gettysburg, Pennsylvania.

Taneytown was the headquarters of Union Army General George Meade for a period during the American Civil War. Fellow Civil War general Jacob G. Lauman was born in Taneytown.

Congressman Joseph A. Goulden of New York was from a family with a house in Taneytown, where he usually stayed during the summer. Goulden was present in Gettysburg when Abraham Lincoln delivered the Gettysburg Address, and Goulden heard the speech in person.

Actor Fred Gwynne, star of TV's The Munsters, and his wife lived on a farm near Taneytown from the early 1980s till his death in 1993.
