= Frizzellburg, Maryland =

Unincorporated community in Maryland, United States

- Unincorporated community
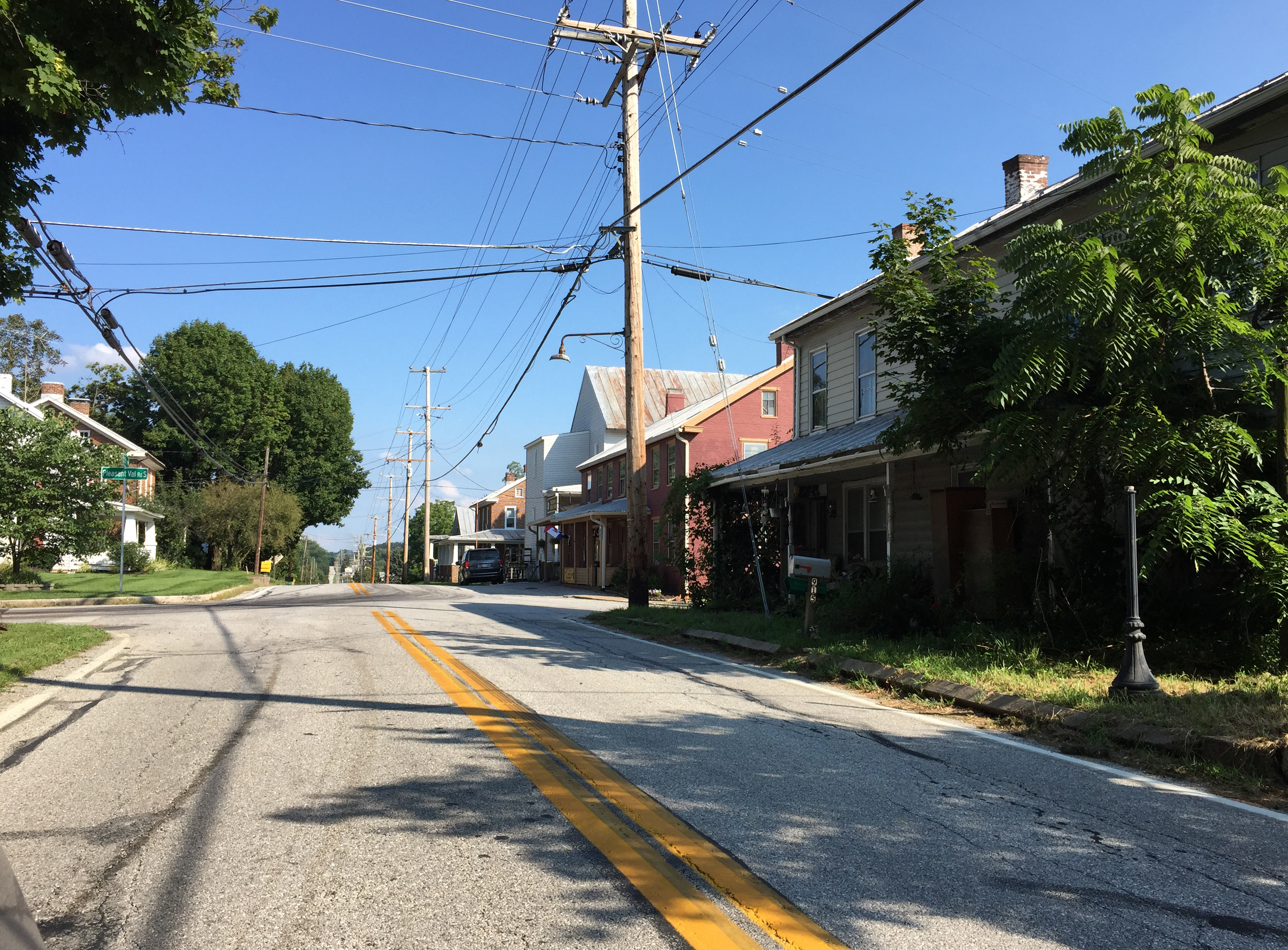
- Central Frizzellburg

- Location within the state of Maryland Frizzellburg (the United States)
- Coordinates: 39°36′18″N 77°03′45″W
- Country: United States
- State: Maryland
- County: Caroll
- Time zone: UTC-5 (Eastern (EST))
  - Summer (DST): UTC-4 (EDT)

Frizzellburg is an unincorporated community in Carroll County, Maryland, United States.

This town grew up around the blacksmith's shop, inn, and general store of Nimrod Frizell in the early 1800s.
