= List of museums in Maryland =

This list of museums in Maryland encompasses museums, defined for this context as institutions (including nonprofit organizations, government entities, and private businesses) that collect and care for objects of cultural, artistic, scientific, or historical interest and make their collections or related exhibits available for public viewing. Museums that exist only in cyberspace (i.e., virtual museums) are not included.

== Museums ==
Name	Location	County	Region	Area of study	Summary
Aberdeen Room Archives & Museum	Aberdeen	Harford	Baltimore/Washington	Local history	
Academy Art Museum	Easton	Talbot	Eastern Shore	Art	works on paper and contemporary works by American and European masters
Adkins Historical Museum	Mardela Springs	Wicomico	Eastern Shore	Open air	eight historic buildings and the gravestones of a Revolutionary War patriot and his wife, buildings open by appointment
African American Heritage House	La Plata	Charles	Southern	African American	Slavery and African American culture in 19th–20th-century Charles County, open by appointment
African American Schoolhouse Museum	Worton	Kent	Eastern Shore	School	Open by appointment
African Art Museum of Maryland	Columbia	Howard	Baltimore/Washington	Art	masks, sculptured figures, textiles, basketry, jewelry, household items, and musical instruments from Africa
Agricultural History Farm Park	Derwood	Montgomery	Baltimore/Washington	Agriculture	10-acre (40,000 m^{2}) complex with historic 1908 Bussard Farmstead farmhouse, barn, assorted farm buildings and an activity center
Airmen Memorial Museum	Suitland	Prince George's	Baltimore/Washington	Military	history of enlisted airmen from 1907 to the present day
Albin O. Kuhn Library & Gallery	Catonsville	Baltimore	Baltimore/Washington	Art	Part of University of Maryland, Baltimore County
Allegany Museum	Cumberland	Allegany	Western	Local history	exhibits include transportation, natural history, changing life, industry, folk art
American Red Cross Information & History Center	Walkersville	Frederick	Baltimore/Washington	History	history of the American Red Cross and the Frederick County Chapter
American Visionary Arts Museum	Baltimore	Baltimore City		Art	Visionary art exhibits and installations relating to identity
Annapolis Maritime Museum	Annapolis	Anne Arundel	Baltimore/Washington	Maritime	maritime environment and culture of the Chesapeake Bay area, includes Barge House Museum
Anne Arundel County Free School	Davidsonville	Anne Arundel	Baltimore/Washington	Education	One room colonial school
Annmarie Garden	Solomons	Calvert	Southern	Art	30-acre (120,000 m^{2}) outdoor sculpture park and arts building for exhibits, classes and workshops
Antietam National Battlefield	Sharpsburg	Washington	Western	Civil War	Includes Visitor Center with exhibits about the Battle of Antietam and the Pry House Field Hospital Museum, about medical care of the wounded in the Civil War
Art Gallery at the University of Maryland	College Park	Prince George's	Baltimore/Washington	Art	Exhibition of significant and challenging contemporary art with an emphasis on emerging and mid-career artists, permanent collections of traditional African sculpture, Social Realist Work from the 1930s, Chinese vessels from 2nd-century B.C. to 17th-century AD, 20th-century Japanese prints, 1930s mural studies
Art Institute & Gallery	Salisbury	Wicomico	Eastern Shore	Art	visual arts center
B&O Ellicott City Station Museum	Ellicott City	Howard	Baltimore/Washington	Railway	Oldest surviving railroad station in America, freight house features 40-foot (12 m) HO-gauge model train
Bainbridge Naval Training Center Museum	Port Deposit	Cecil	Eastern Shore	Military	history of United States Naval Training Center Bainbridge
Ballestone-Stansbury House	Essex	Baltimore	Baltimore/Washington	Historic house	19th-century-period house with American Decorative arts from 1780-1880
Baltimore Museum of Art	Baltimore	Baltimore City		Art	Art museum with extensive European, Asian, African, and South American collections, as well as impressive modern and contemporary exhibits and temporary exhibits
Banneker-Douglass Museum	Annapolis	Anne Arundel	Baltimore/Washington	African American	Black life in Maryland, African and African American art, important African American Marylanders
Barbara Fritchie House and Museum	Frederick	Frederick	Baltimore/Washington	Historic house	Reconstructed house of Barbara Fritchie, heroine of John Greenleaf Whittier's poem from the Civil War. "Shoot if you must, this old gray head, but spare your country's flag, she said" while leaning out an upstairs window. https://web.archive.org/web/20151019062408/http://www.visitfrederick.org/members/view/84
Barren Creek Springs Heritage Center and Museum	Mardela Springs	Wicomico	Eastern Shore	Local history	operated by the Westside Historical Society, includes the museum, Barren Creek Springs Church and Barren Creek Springhouse
Barron's C & O Canal Museum & Country Store	Sharpsburg	Washington	Western	History	C&O Canal artifacts, located at Snyder's Landing
Beall-Dawson House	Rockville	Montgomery	Baltimore/Washington	Historic house	Operated by the Montgomery County Historical Society, early-19th-century-period house including indoor slave quarters, and the Stonestreet Museum of 19th Century Medicine
Beatty-Cramer House	Frederick	Frederick	Baltimore/Washington	Historic house	owned by the Frederick County Landmarks Foundation, open by appointment, 1732 Beatty house, c.1855 Cramer house addition, 18th-century spring house, 19th-century smoke house
Beaver Creek School Museum	Hagerstown	Washington	Western	History	operated by the Washington County Historical Society, 1904 two-room schoolhouse, exhibits include a recreated workshop, cobblers station, vintage toys and dolls, clothing, antique instruments, recreation of an early-20th-century parlor
Belair Mansion	Bowie	Prince George's	Baltimore/Washington	Historic house	Five-part Georgian plantation house of Samuel Ogle, Provincial Governor of Maryland, later home to William Woodward, Jr., famous horseman in the first half of the 20th century
Belair Stable Museum	Bowie	Prince George's	Baltimore/Washington	Historic site	Horse stable museum
Belmont Manor and Historic Park	Elkridge	Howard	Baltimore/Washington	Historic house	Mid 18th century manor house and park
Benjamin Banneker Historical Park and Museum	Catonsville	Baltimore	Baltimore/Washington	Biographical	Operated by Baltimore County, 138-acre (0.56 km^{2}) park with museum about African American mathematician and scientist Benjamin Banneker
Benson-Hammond House	Linthicum	Anne Arundel	Baltimore/Washington	Historic house	Operated by the Ann Arrundell County Historical Society
Betterton Heritage Museum	Betterton	Kent	Eastern Shore	Local history	
Billingsley House Museum	Upper Marlboro	Prince George's	Baltimore/Washington	Historic house	brick Tidewater Colonial plantation house that sits on 430 acres (1.7 km^{2})
Bjorlee Museum	Frederick	Frederick	Baltimore/Washington	Education	History of the Maryland School for the Deaf
Blackwater National Wildlife Refuge	Cambridge	Dorchester	Eastern Shore	Natural history	Visitors center contains wildlife exhibits, bird-watching cameras and viewing areas
Bob's Vintage Museum	Columbia	Howard	Baltimore/Washington	Transportation	historic BMW motorcycles, parts and accessories, trophies, collectibles, BMW toys and scale models, advertising
Boonsborough Museum of History	Boonsboro	Washington	Western	Local history	Civil War and local history artifacts
Boonsboro Trolley Museum	Boonsboro	Washington	Western	Railway	restored trolley station and cars
Bowman House	Boonsboro	Washington	Western	Historic house	19th-century log house, operated by the Boonsboro Historical Society
Boyds Negro School	Sandy Spring	Montgomery	Baltimore/Washington	School	operated by the Boyds Historical Society, one room building that served as the only public school for African Americans in the Boyds area from 1895–1936
Brooke Whiting House & Museum	Cumberland	Allegany	Western	Decorative arts	collections include Chinese ceramics, Allegany County historic glassware, American furniture, period rooms, Asian works of art, American, British, and European decorative arts; operated by the Allegany County Historical Society
Bruce "Snake" Gabrielson's Surf Art Gallery and Museum	Chesapeake Beach	Calvert	Southern	History	This free museum contains many significant historical items related to the sport of surfing collected by its founder over the past 50 years. Website
Brunswick Heritage Museum	Brunswick	Frederick	Baltimore/Washington	Railway	Demonstrates the effect of railroads on society in a company town
Button Farm Living History Center	Germantown	Montgomery	Baltimore/Washington	Living	19th-century slave plantation life, features a Civil War-era barn, outbuildings, and slave cemetery, and is home to the Underground Railroad Immersion Experience; set on 60 acres (240,000 m^{2}) of Seneca Creek State Park, project of The Menare Foundation
C&D Canal Museum	Chesapeake City	Cecil	Eastern Shore	Transportation - Canal	History of the Chesapeake and Delaware Canal
Calvert Marine Museum	Solomons	Calvert	Southern	Maritime	Traditional Chesapeake Bay wooden vessels, human activity along the Patuxent River, marine fossils, local maritime industry, lighthouses, live otters and estuary marine life
Calvin B. Taylor House	Berlin	Worcester	Eastern Shore	Historic house	19th-century house museum with gallery of local memorabilia; operated by the Berlin Heritage Foundation
Canal Place	Cumberland	Allegany	Western	Transportation	Location of the C&O Canal National Historical Park Cumberland Visitor Center, canal boat replica "The Cumberland" and Western Maryland Scenic Railroad
Captain Salem Avery House Museum	Shady Side	Anne Arundel	Baltimore/Washington	Maritime	Operated by the Shady Side Rural Heritage Society; watermen's museum in an 1860 house
Carroll County Farm Museum	Westminster	Carroll	Baltimore/Washington	Open air	Mid-19th-century rural life depicted with original farm structures, such as the 1850s farmhouse, bank barn, smokehouse, broom shop, saddlery, springhouse, Living History Center, wagon shed, general store exhibit, and one-room schoolhouse
Cecil County Farm Museum	Elkton	Cecil	Eastern Shore	Agriculture	
Center for Art, Design and Visual Culture	Catonsville	Baltimore	Baltimore/Washington	Art	Art gallery of the University of Maryland, Baltimore County, manages the Joseph Beuys Sculpture Park
Charles Carroll House of Annapolis	Annapolis	Anne Arundel	Baltimore/Washington	Historic house	home of Charles Carroll of Annapolis, (1702-1782), and Charles Carroll of Carrollton, (1737-1832)
Chesapeake and Ohio Canal National Historical Park	Various			Transportation - Canal	Visitor centers at Georgetown, Great Falls Tavern, Brunswick, Williamsport, Hancock, and Cumberland have displays and interpretive exhibits about the history of the C & O Canal
Chesapeake Bay Maritime Museum	St. Michaels	Talbot	Eastern Shore	Maritime	Chesapeake Bay maritime, historical and Native American artifacts, visual arts and indigenous water craft
Chesapeake Beach Railway Museum	Chesapeake Beach	Calvert	Southern	Railway	History of Chesapeake Beach Railway, also local history
Chesapeake Children's Museum	Annapolis	Anne Arundel	Baltimore/Washington	Children's	
Chesapeake Fire Museum	Hebron	Wicomico	Eastern Shore	Firefighting	
Chestertown RiverArts	Chestertown	Kent	Eastern Shore	Art	community art center with an exhibit gallery
Choptank River Light	Cambridge	Dorchester	Eastern Shore	Maritime	Replica lighthouse open for tours
Clara Barton National Historic Site	Glen Echo	Montgomery	Baltimore/Washington	Biographical	Early history of the American Red Cross and the last home of its founder, Clara Barton
Cliffs Schoolhouse	Cliff City	Kent	Eastern Shore	School	Open by appointment
College Park Aviation Museum	College Park	Prince George's	Baltimore/Washington	Aviation	Antique and reproduction airplanes, aviation artifacts associated with historic College Park Airport
Concord Point Lighthouse	Havre de Grace	Harford	Baltimore/Washington	Maritime	
Costen House	Pocomoke City	Worcester	Eastern Shore	Historic house	1870 Victorian house
Country Store & Drug Store Museum	Mt. Airy	Carroll	Baltimore/Washington	History	turn of the 20th century country store and pharmacy, tours by appointment
Cove Point Light	Lusby	Calvert	Southern	Maritime	Operated by the Calvert Marine Museum, seasonal tours of the operating lighthouse
Cray House	Stevensville	Queen Anne's	Eastern Shore	Historic house	1809 two-room house
Darnall's Chance House Museum	Upper Marlboro	Prince George's	Baltimore/Washington	Historic house	1742 15-room brick house furnished to 1760
David C. Driskell Center for the Study of the Visual Arts and Culture of African Americans and the African Diaspora	College Park	Prince George's	Baltimore/Washington	Art	Part of University of Maryland, College Park
Deep Creek Lake Discovery Center	Swanton	Garrett	Western	Nature center	Exhibits about the area's natural, cultural and historical heritage
Delaplaine Visual Arts Education Center	Frederick	Frederick	Baltimore/Washington	Art	houses five galleries for art exhibits
Dickinson Gorsuch Farm Museum	Cockeysville	Baltimore	Baltimore/Washington	Agriculture	operated by appointment by the Historical Society of Baltimore County, farm tools and equipment
Discovery Station	Hagerstown	Washington	Western	Science	Science, technology, space exploration, history, geology, health, agricultural and transportation exhibits
Doleman Black Heritage Museum	Hagerstown	Washington	Western	African American	
Dr. Samuel A. Mudd House	Waldorf	Charles	Southern	Historic house	Home of Lincoln assassination conspirator Samuel A. Mudd
Dundalk-Patapsco Neck Historical Society Museum	Dundalk	Baltimore	Baltimore/Washington	Local history	period rooms, local artifacts and photographs
Eden Mill Nature Center & Historic Mill Museum	Pylesville	Harford	Baltimore/Washington	Nature center	Natural history exhibits, historic grist mill
Ellicott City Colored School	Ellicott City	Howard	Baltimore/Washington	African American	tours by appointment
Ellicott City Fire Station	Ellicott City	Howard	Baltimore/Washington	Firefighting	open by appointment
Family Heritage Museum	Friendsville	Garrett	Western	History	located on the 1st floor of the Friend Family Association of America
Federalsburg Area Heritage Museum	Federalsburg	Caroline	Eastern Shore	Local history	
Fire Museum of Maryland	Lutherville	Baltimore	Baltimore/Washington	Firefighting	firefighting equipment, apparatus and memorabilia, over 50 rigs
Fort Frederick State Park	Big Pool	Washington	Western	Military	Restored stone walls, 1758 barracks, exhibits, also museum about the Civilian Conservation Corps
Fort George G. Meade Museum	Fort Meade	Anne Arundel	Baltimore/Washington	Military	Historical artifacts, uniforms, weapons, tanks, photographs, documents and paintings pertaining to the history of Fort George G. Meade
Fort Washington Park	Fort Washington	Prince George's	Baltimore/Washington	Military	Visitor center houses exhibits about the fort
Frederick County Fire & Rescue Museum	Emmitsburg	Frederick	Baltimore/Washington	Firefighting	historic fire apparatus, equipment, uniforms
Frostburg Museum	Frostburg	Allegany	Western	Local history	coal mining, cameras and historic photographs, band instruments, school exhibit, tools and farm implements, doll houses, local artifacts
Furnace Town Living Heritage Museum	Snow Hill	Worcester	Eastern Shore	Living	1830s village for local iron manufacturing industry
Gaithersburg Community Museum	Gaithersburg	Montgomery	Baltimore/Washington	Local history	Historic freight house, history park and a caboose
Gaithersburg - Washington Grove V.F.D. Fire Museum	Gaithersburg	Montgomery	Baltimore/Washington	Firefighting	
Galesville Heritage Museum	Galesville	Anne Arundel	Baltimore/Washington	Local history	operated by the Galesville Heritage Society
Garrett County Historical Society Museum	Oakland	Garrett	Western	Local history	includes model train layout, schools, coal mining, industry, culture, clothing, military, period room displays
Garrett County Transportation Museum	Oakland	Garrett	Western	Transportation	includes carriages, sleighs, buggies, fire department artifacts and automobiles, blacksmith shop, local history displays, operated by the Garrett County Historical Society
Geddes-Piper House	Chestertown	Kent	Eastern Shore	Historic house	1784 Georgian brick townhouse, headquarters of the Historical Society of Kent County
Geiser-Mason Farm Museum	Smithsburg	Washington	Western	Agriculture	Open by appointment
George Alfred Townsend Museum	Burkittsville	Frederick	Baltimore/Washington	Biographical	Part of Gathland State Park, includes remains of estate of Civil War correspondent George Alfred Townsend
Goldman Art Gallery	Rockville	Montgomery	Baltimore/Washington	Ethnic - Jewish	part of the Jewish Community Center of Greater Washington
Girdletree Barnes Bank	Girdletree	Worcester	Eastern Shore	Local history	Housed in an early-20th-century bank building
Glenn L. Martin Maryland Aviation Museum	Middle River	Baltimore	Baltimore/Washington	Aerospace	aviation and aerospace history in Maryland, particularly the Glenn L. Martin Company
Glenview Mansion Art Gallery	Rockville	Montgomery	Baltimore/Washington	Art	Changing exhibits
Goddard Visitor Center	Greenbelt	Prince George's	Baltimore/Washington	Aerospace	Part of Goddard Space Flight Center
Gordon-Roberts House	Cumberland	Allegany	Western	Historic house	home of the Allegany County Historical Society, Second Empire style home decorated for upper-class family life of the late 19th century
Goucher College Art Galleries	Towson	Baltimore	Baltimore/Washington	Art	Silber Art Gallery, Rosenberg Gallery and Corrin Student Gallery
Government House	Annapolis	Anne Arundel	Baltimore/Washington	Historic house	Home for the governor of Maryland since 1870
Grantsville Community Museum	Grantsville	Garrett	Western	Local history	operated by the Garrett County Historical Society
Greenbelt Museum	Greenbelt	Prince George's	Baltimore/Washington	Historic house	original International Style house furnished with objects from the period of 1936-1946
Hager House	Hagerstown	Washington	Western	Historic house	1739 fieldstone frontier house
Hagerstown Aviation Museum	Hagerstown	Washington	Western	Aviation	story of Hagerstown’s over seventy-year history of aircraft design and manufacture
Hagerstown City Park Train Hub	Hagerstown	Washington	Western	Railway	Includes Western Maryland 202, signs, signals, bells, telephones and tools that were used by railroad workers.
Hagerstown Roundhouse Museum	Hagerstown	Washington	Western	Railway	Area railroad history and model train layouts
Hammond-Harwood House	Annapolis	Anne Arundel	Baltimore/Washington	Historic house	1774 mansion
Hampton National Historic Site	Hampton	Baltimore	Baltimore/Washington	Historic house	18th-century estate including a Georgian manor house and original stone slave quarters
Hancock's Resolution	Pasadena	Anne Arundel	Baltimore/Washington	Living	1785 farmstead park on 26 acres (110,000 m^{2}), consists of stone house, kitchen added in the 1850s, a stone milk house, gardens, a cemetery and an active beehive, operated by the Friends of Hancock's Resolution
Hancock Museum and Visitor Center	Hancock	Washington	Western	Local history	natural history, orchard industry, operated by the Hancock Historical Society and the Town of Hancock
Hancock Town Museum	Hancock	Washington	Western	Local history	antiques, tools, local artifacts, exhibits on C & O Canal, National Pike, and Western Maryland Railroad; operated by the Hancock Historical Society, also Hancock Toll House open by appointment
Harriet Tubman Museum & Educational Center	Cambridge	Dorchester	Eastern Shore	Biographical	life of Harriet Tubman
Havre de Grace Decoy Museum	Havre de Grace	Harford	Baltimore/Washington	Art	collection of working & decorative Chesapeake Bay decoys, historical and cultural legacy of waterfowling and decoy making
Havre de Grace Maritime Museum	Havre de Grace	Harford	Baltimore/Washington	Maritime	Historical maritime skills, culture, heritage, and environment of the Lower Susquehanna River, Upper Chesapeake Bay region, and their watersheds
Hays House Museum	Bel Air	Harford	Baltimore/Washington	Historic house	Operated by the Historical Society of Harford County, Colonial period house
Heart of the Civil War Heritage Area Exhibit and Visitor Center	Sharpsburg	Washington	Western	Civil War	Displays about the Civil War in the Washington, Carroll and Frederick County, area visitor information
Heritage Society of Essex and Middle River	Essex	Baltimore	Baltimore/Washington	Local history	
His Lordship's Kindness	Clinton	Prince George's	Baltimore/Washington	Historic house	1780s Georgian mansion and plantation, also known as Poplar Hill on His Lordship's Kindness
Historic Annapolis Museum	Annapolis	Anne Arundel	Baltimore/Washington	Local history	also called 99 Maine Street, operated by the Historic Annapolis Foundation
Historic Port Tobacco Village	Port Tobacco	Charles	Southern	Local history	costumed docents tell story of Port Tobacco from 1620 to present, tours include the Port Tobacco Courthouse, Stagg Hall, and Burch House
Historical Society of Baltimore County	Cockeysville	Baltimore	Baltimore/Washington	County history, genealogy resources	Located in a historic almshouse
Historical Society of Carroll County	Westminster	Carroll	Baltimore/Washington	Historic house	operates the 1807 Sherman-Fisher-Shellman House and adjacent Shriver-Weybright Exhibition Gallery in the Kimmey House
Historical Society of Cecil County	Elkton	Cecil	Eastern Shore	Local history	19th-century furnishings, historic artifacts, works of art of local interest, country store, log house, the Early American kitchen and John F. DeWitt Military Museum
Historical Society of Harford County	Bel Air	Harford	Baltimore/Washington	Local history	local and county history artifacts, Native American rock carving collection
Historical Society of Talbot County Museum	Easton	Talbot	Eastern Shore	Local history	also gives guided tours of three adjacent historic homes: Joseph's Cottage, James Neall House, Forman's Studio
Historic London Town and Gardens	Edgewater	Anne Arundel	Baltimore/Washington	Multiple	23-acre (93,000 m^{2}) park with William Brown House, a historic house museum, ongoing archaeological digs of the late-17th- and early-18th-century Londontowne, 8 acres (32,000 m^{2}) of botanical gardens
Historic St. Mary's City	St. Mary's City	St. Mary's	Southern	Living	17th-century setting including reconstructed State House of 1676, Smith's Ordinary, the Godiah Spray Tobacco Plantation, a working colonial farm
Hogshead	Annapolis	Anne Arundel	Baltimore/Washington	Historic house	Operated by Historic Annapolis Foundation, 18th-century period house with Colonial-era enactors
House of Yoder	Grantsville	Garrett	Western	Historic house	modern house of mid-18th-century-period design construction, located in Spruce Forest Artisan Village
Howard County Heritage Orientation Center	Ellicott City	Howard	Baltimore/Washington	Local history	exhibits on 18th- and 19th-century milling techniques, floods of Ellicott Mills, the Ellicott Family
Howard County Historical Society	Ellicott City	Howard	Baltimore/Washington	Local history	museum housed in the former First Presbyterian Church
Howard County Living Farm Heritage Museum	West Friendship	Howard	Baltimore/Washington	Farm	operated by the Howard County Antique Farm Machinery Club
Huntington Railroad Museum	Bowie	Prince George's	Baltimore/Washington	Railway	Historic Bowie Station switch tower, freight depot, and waiting shed, caboose
Hyattstown Mill	Hyattstown	Montgomery	Baltimore/Washington	Art	historic mill housing the Hyattstown Mill Arts Project
Irvin Allen/Michael Cresap Museum	Oldtown	Allegany	Western	Historic house	Also known as Michael Cresap Museum, 1764 stone house with period furnishings, open by appointment and for special events
Irvine Nature Center	Owings Mills	Baltimore	Baltimore/Washington	Natural history	Set on 116 acres (0.47 km2) of land, exhibits focus on the animals, plants and environment of the Piedmont woodlands, wetlands and meadows
James E. Kirwan Museum	Stevensville	Queen Anne's	Eastern Shore	Historic house	operated by the Kent Island Heritage Society
Janus Museum	Washington Grove	Montgomery	Baltimore/Washington	Art	work and collections of Allan Janus
Jefferson Patterson Park & Museum	St. Leonard	Calvert	Southern	Archaeology	Home of the Maryland Archaeological Conservation Laboratory
Jerusalem Mill Village	Jerusalem	Harford	Baltimore/Washington	Living	Located in Gunpowder Falls State Park, Quaker village demonstrating 18th- through early-20th-century life
J. Millard Tawes Historical Museum	Crisfield	Somerset	Eastern Shore	Local history	Traces the history of the Maryland lower shore
John Poole House	Poolesville	Montgomery	Baltimore/Washington	Historic house	operated by Historic Medley, 1793 log house and general store, includes E.L. Stock, Jr. Memorial Arboretum
Josiah Henson Park	North Bethesda	Montgomery	Baltimore/Washington	African American	located on the old Isaac Riley Farm where Reverend Josiah Henson lived and worked as a slave from 1795 to 1830. His 1849 autobiography inspired Harriet Beecher Stowe's landmark novel, Uncle Tom's Cabin.
Julia A. Purnell Museum	Snow Hill	Worcester	Eastern Shore	Local history	Kitchen and hearth exhibits, Victorian clothing and adornments, machines and tools, general store
Kennedy Farm	Sharpsburg	Washington	Western	Historic house	Place where John Brown planned and began his raid on Harpers Ferry, open by appointment
Kent Museum	Kennedyville	Kent	Eastern Shore	Agriculture	Agricultural equipment and antique household items
King Dairy Barn Mooseum	Germantown	Montgomery	Baltimore/Washington	Agriculture	dairy farming
Kingsley Schoolhouse	Clarksburg	Montgomery	Baltimore/Washington	School	late-19th-century one-room schoolhouse
Kitzmiller Coal Mining Museum	Kitzmiller	Garrett	Western	Industry - mining	
Ladew Topiary Gardens	Monkton	Harford	Baltimore/Washington	Historic house	Includes the manor house with antique English furniture, equestrian paintings and fox hunting memorabilia
La Grange Plantation	Cambridge	Dorchester	Eastern Shore	Open air	Home of the Dorchester County Historical Society, includes mid-19th-century Georgian Meredith House with period rooms, exhibits on local history, agriculture, domestic life, antique transportation vehicles, trade tools
Lamar Surgical Suite and Civil War Museum	Middletown	Frederick	Baltimore/Washington	Medical	home of the Central Maryland Heritage League, turn-of-the-century rural medical sanitarium, open by appointment
La Plata Train Station	La Plata	Charles	Southern	Railway	station and caboose
Latvian Museum	Rockville	Montgomery	Baltimore/Washington	Ethnic	Latvian costumes and textiles, original and reproduction farm tools, examples of traditional crafts
Laurel Museum	Laurel	Prince George's	Baltimore/Washington	Local history	Operated by the Laurel Historical Society, mill town roots, railroad connections, African-American community, early suburban experiences, schools, fire department, shops, banks, Main Street
Mansion House Art Center	Hagerstown	Washington	Western	Art	1846 Georgian-style house, headquarters for the Valley Art Association
Marietta House Museum	Glenn Dale	Prince George's	Baltimore/Washington	Historic house	Federal style mansion furnished to reflect three generations from 1815 to 1902
Marion Station Railroad Museum	Marion	Somerset	Eastern Shore	Railway	
Maryland Dove	St. Mary's City	St. Mary's	Southern	Maritime	Re-creation of a late-17th-century trading ship
Maryland State House	Annapolis	Anne Arundel	Baltimore/Washington	State capitol	Oldest state capitol in continuous legislative use, dating to 1772
Maryland Veterans Memorial Museum	Newburg	Charles	Southern	Military	
Massey Air Museum	Massey	Kent	Eastern Shore	Aviation	Located at the Massey Aerodrome, collection of small aircraft from the 30s to 50s, also puts on air shows
McMahon's Mill Civil War Military & American Heritage Museum	Williamsport	Washington	Western	History	open by appointment, military weapons and artifacts, ceramic art, brass rubbings, antique record players, coins, jewelry
Miller House Museum	Hagerstown	Washington	Western	Historic house	Federal period brick townhouse, home of the Washington County Historical Society
Mitchell Gallery	Annapolis	Anne Arundel	Baltimore/Washington	Art	part of St. John's College
Monocacy National Battlefield	Frederick	Frederick	Baltimore/Washington	Civil War	Visitor center houses interpretive displays and artifacts from the Battle of Monocacy Junction
Montpelier Mansion	Laurel	Prince George's	Baltimore/Washington	Historic house	1780s five-part Georgian home with period rooms
Mount Aventine	Bryans Road	Charles	Southern	Historic house	Located in Chapman State Park, mid 19th-century manor house, open for events
Mount Calvert Historical & Archaeological Park	Upper Marlboro	Prince George's	Baltimore/Washington	Archaeology	includes outdoor interpretive panels highlighting area's cultural history and a restored plantation house with exhibits about the Native Americans, English Colonists and African Americans at Mount Calvert, as well as artifacts from the ongoing archaeological digs
Mount Harmon Plantation	Earleville	Cecil	Eastern Shore	Historic house	18th-century tobacco plantation on 290 acres (1.2 km^{2})
Mount Savage Museum Bank and Jail	Mount Savage	Allegany	Western	Local history	restored 1800s miners home with exhibits about the Mt. Savage Iron Works, railroad, brick and mining industries, operated by the Mount Savage Historical Society
Mt. Zion One Room School Museum	Snow Hill	Worcester	Eastern Shore	School	19th-century one-room school
Museum of Eastern Shore Culture	Salisbury	Wicomico	Eastern Shore	Art	Formerly the Ward Museum of Waterfowl Art and part of Salisbury University, it now highlights Maryland and the Delmarva Peninsula's broad culture.
Museum of Frederick County History	Frederick	Frederick	Baltimore/Washington	Local history	operated by the Historical Society of Frederick County, exhibits of historical artifacts, decorative and fine arts that tell the story of Frederick County, Maryland
Museum of Rural Life	Denton	Caroline	Eastern Shore	Local history	operated by the Caroline County Historical Society
Nabb Research Center for Delmarva History and Culture	Salisbury	Wicomico	Eastern Shore	Local history	changing exhibits from its collections, part of Salisbury University
National Capital Radio & Television Museum	Bowie	Prince George's	Baltimore/Washington	Media	History of radio and television from the telegraph through the rise of television
National Capital Trolley Museum	Colesville	Montgomery	Baltimore/Washington	Railway	Historic trolleys used in Washington D.C.
National Colonial Farm	Accokeek	Prince George's	Baltimore/Washington	Living	1770s tobacco planting farm
National Cryptologic Museum	Fort Meade	Anne Arundel	Baltimore/Washington	Military	Exhibits include working World War II German Enigma machine, a bombe used to break it, and displays covering the history of American cryptology
National Electronics Museum	Hunt Valley	Baltimore	Baltimore/Washington	Technology	Telegraph, radio, radar and satellite equipment
National Institutes of Health Visitor Center and Nobel Laureate Exhibit Hall	Bethesda	Montgomery	Baltimore/Washington	Medical	Scientific and medical research that improves human health and prevents disease, also additional exhibits on display in several campus locations including the DeWitt Stetten, Jr., Museum of Medical Research
National Museum of Civil War Medicine	Frederick	Frederick	Baltimore/Washington	Medical	Medical care during the Civil War, advancements in treatment
National Museum of Health and Medicine	Silver Spring	Montgomery	Baltimore/Washington	Medical	Located in Forest Glen Annex
National Museum of Language	College Park	Prince George's	Baltimore/Washington	Language	The world's languages, their origins, alphabets, and evolution
National Shrine of St. Elizabeth Ann Seton	Emmitsburg	Frederick	Baltimore/Washington	Religious	Shrine to Elizabeth Ann Seton, also contains museum of her life and canonization, video/orientation theater, restored 1750 Stone House, 1810 White House, Basilica, cemetery and chapel
National Wildlife Visitor Center at Patuxent Research Refuge	Laurel	Prince George's	Baltimore/Washington	Natural history	Work at the refuge, global environmental issues, migratory bird studies, habitats, endangered species, research tools and techniques used by scientists
New Windsor Museum	New Windsor	Carroll	Baltimore/Washington	Local history	operated by the New Windsor Heritage Committee
Northampton Plantation Slave Quarters	Lake Arbor	Prince George's	Baltimore/Washington	Open air	Ruins of the manor house, its outbuildings and roads, and the remains of two slave quarters
Oakley Cabin African American Museum and Park	Brookeville	Montgomery	Baltimore/Washington	Historic house	early-19th-century African American-owned log cabin, site on the Underground Railroad
Ocean City Life-Saving Station Museum	Ocean City	Worcester	Eastern Shore	Maritime	Exhibits on storms, sea life, life-saving in Ocean City, sand collection, aquariums, doll houses
Old Jail Museum	Leonardtown	St. Mary's	Southern	Local history	home for St. Mary's County Historical Society archives, also local history artifacts
Old Stevensville Post Office	Stevensville	Queen Anne's	Eastern Shore	Historic site	Part of the Historic Sites Consortium of Queen Anne's County
Old Town Hall Bank Museum and Exhibit Hall	Poolesville	Montgomery	Baltimore/Washington	Local history	operated by Historic Medley
Original Playhouse Children's Museum	New Market	Frederick	Baltimore/Washington	Children's	historic fire apparatus, equipment, uniforms
Oxford Museum (Maryland)	Oxford	Talbot	Eastern Shore	Local history	
Oxon Cove Park and Oxon Hill Farm	Oxon Hill	Prince George's	Baltimore/Washington	Farm	Historic Mount Welby plantation home and working Oxon Hill Farm
Patuxent River Naval Air Museum	Lexington Park	St. Mary's	Southern	Aviation	Heritage of the research, development, test and evaluation of naval aircraft
Patuxent Rural Museums	Upper Marlboro	Prince George's	Baltimore/Washington	History	includes Duvall Tool Museum, Blacksmith Shop & Farriar and Tack Shop, Tobacco Farming Museum, Duckett Cabin, Sears Roebuck and Company 1923 Simplex Sectional House
Paw Paw Museum	Port Deposit	Cecil	Eastern Shore	Local history	
Pemberton Hall	Salisbury	Wicomico	Eastern Shore	Historic house	Part of Pemberton Historical Park, 1741 plantation home
Perryville Railway Museum	Perryville	Cecil	Eastern Shore	Railway	Area railroad history, model trail layout, also a MARC commuter railroad station
Piney Point Light	Piney Point	St. Mary's	Southern	Lighthouse	Includes lighthouse, museum and historic boat display
Piscataway Indian Museum	Waldorf	Charles	Southern	Native American	history and culture of the Piscataway tribe and other native peoples
Point Lookout Light	Scotland	St. Mary's	Southern	Maritime	
Point Lookout State Park	Scotland	St. Mary's	Southern	Civil War	Houses the Civil War Museum/Marshland Nature Center, open on weekends
Poplar Hill Mansion	Salisbury	Wicomico	Eastern Shore	Historic house	Circa 1795 mansion on National Register of Historic Places
Port Republic School Number 7	Port Republic	Calvert	Southern	School	one room schoolhouse
Queen Anne's Museum of Eastern Shore Life	Centreville	Queen Anne's	Eastern Shore	Local history	part of the Historic Sites Consortium of Queen Anne's County, antique farm implements, tools, watermen's items, blacksmith shop, Native American artifacts
Queenstown Colonial Courthouse	Queenstown	Queen Anne's	Eastern Shore	Historic site	part of the Historic Sites Consortium of Queen Anne's County
Queponco Railway Station	Newark	Worcester	Eastern Shore	Railway	Historic railway station
Ratner Museum	Bethesda	Montgomery	Baltimore/Washington	Art	a walk through the Hebrew Bible via visual arts
R. Frank Jones Museum	Snow Hill	Worcester	Eastern Shore	Local history	Located at Furnace Town Living Heritage Museum, exhibits on local history and processing of pig iron
Richardson Maritime Museum	Cambridge	Dorchester	Eastern Shore	Maritime	models of Chesapeake Bay traditional wooden sailing vessels, boatbuilders' tools and watermen's artifacts;
Ridgeley Rosenwald School	Capitol Heights	Prince George's	Baltimore/Washington	School	historic segregated school that served area African American children until the 1950s
Ritchie History Museum	Fort Ritchie	Washington	Western	Military	
Ripley's Believe It or Not! Museum	Ocean City	Worcester	Eastern Shore	Amusement	
Riversdale	Riverdale	Prince George's	Baltimore/Washington	Historic house	Early-19th-century Federal-style plantation home
Rock Hall Museum (Rock Hall, Maryland)	Rock Hall	Kent	Eastern Shore	Local history	watermen, decoys, ship models, local artifacts
Roger Brooke Taney House	Frederick	Frederick	Baltimore/Washington	Historic house	owned by the Historical Society of Frederick County, home of fifth Chief Justice of the United States Supreme Court Roger Brooke Taney, site includes the house, detached kitchen, root cellar, smokehouse and slaves quarters
Rose Hill Manor Park & Children's Museum	Frederick	Frederick	Baltimore/Washington	Open air	Includes the late-18th-century historic home, garden, ice house, smokehouse, blacksmith shop, carriage museum, log cabin and farm museum
Salisbury University Art Galleries	Salisbury	Wicomico	Eastern Shore	Art	University Gallery, Electronic Gallery and Gallery at Downtown Campus
Sandy Spring Museum	Sandy Spring	Montgomery	Baltimore/Washington	Local history	
Sandy Spring Slave Museum & Art Gallery	Sandy Spring	Montgomery	Baltimore/Washington	History	slave experience, open by appointment
Schifferstadt Architectural Museum	Frederick	Frederick	Baltimore/Washington	Historic house	1756 colonial German house, owned by the Frederick County Landmarks Foundation
Seabrook Schoolhouse	Lanham	Prince George's	Baltimore/Washington	School	1896 one-room schoolhouse, open by appointment
Seneca Schoolhouse Museum	Seneca	Montgomery	Baltimore/Washington	School	operated by Historic Medley
Sharptown Historical Museum	Salisbury	Wicomico	Eastern Shore	Local history	
Silver Spring Historical Society	Silver Spring	Montgomery	Baltimore/Washington	Local history	
Smallwood State Park	Marbury	Charles	Southern	Historic house	Houses Smallwood's Retreat, 1760 plantation home of William Smallwood
Smithsburg Town Museum	Smithsburg	Washington	Western	Local history	operated by the Smithsburg Historical Society
Sotterley Plantation	Hollywood	St. Mary's	Southern	Historic house	18th-century plantation home, slave cabin and outbuildings on 95 acres (380,000 m^{2})
South Dorchester Folk Museum	Church Creek	Dorchester	Eastern Shore	History	Preserves the heritage & history of the southern areas of Dorchester County. Website
South Mountain Heritage Society	Burkittsville	Frederick	Baltimore/Washington	Local history	themes include commerce, industry, religion, community, African American, and Civil War
Spocott Windmill	Cambridge	Dorchester	Eastern Shore	Open air	includes replica 19th-century post windmill, miller's cottage, blacksmith shop, country store and museum
Spruce Forest Artisan Village	Grantsville	Garrett	Western	Multiple	arts and heritage center with resident and visiting artisans demonstrating their craft, living history programs and several historic house museums
Star Toys Museum	Linthicum	Anne Arundel	Baltimore/Washington	Toy	private collection of Star Wars toys and collectibles, open by appointment
St. Clement's Island Museum	Colton's Point	St. Mary's	Southern	History	Maryland’s earliest history and Potomac River heritage, includes Little Red Schoolhouse, also known as Potomac River Museum
Steppingstone Museum	Havre de Grace	Harford	Baltimore/Washington	Living	Preserves & demonstrates rural arts & crafts of the 1880-1920 period, includes Victorian farmhouse, blacksmith, joiner, woodwright, copper, potter, wheelwright, dairy farmer, spinner and weaver
Stevensville Train Depot	Stevensville	Queen Anne's	Eastern Shore	Railway	Part of the Historic Sites Consortium of Queen Anne's County
St. Martin's Episcopal Church Museum	Showell	Worcester	Eastern Shore	Church	1764 Georgian brick church
St. Michaels Museum at St. Mary's Square	St. Michaels	Talbot	Eastern Shore	Local history	
Stonestreet Museum of 19th Century Medicine	Rockville	Montgomery	Baltimore/Washington	Medical	Operated by the Montgomery County Historical Society at the Beall-Dawson House, one room doctor's office
Strawbridge Shrine	New Windsor	Carroll	Baltimore/Washington	Biographical	home of Robert Strawbridge, founder of American Methodism, open by appointment
Strathmore	North Bethesda	Montgomery	Baltimore/Washington	Art	Music performing center, art exhibitions and outdoor sculpture park
Sturgis One Room School Museum	Pocomoke City	Worcester	Eastern Shore	School	Historic African American one-room school
Sudlersville Train Station Museum	Sudlersville	Queen Anne's	Eastern Shore	Local history	memorabilia of baseball player Jimmie Foxx
Surratt House Museum	Clinton	Prince George's	Baltimore/Washington	Historic house	Mid-19th-century home of Mary Surratt, safe house for the Confederate underground, exhibits about the Lincoln conspiracy
Susquehanna Museum at the Lock House	Havre de Grace	Harford	Baltimore/Washington	Local history	restored canal lock house with local history exhibits and living history special events
Susquehanna State Park	Havre de Grace	Harford	Baltimore/Washington	Multiple	Contains historic Rock Run Grist Mill and Rock Run House, a 14-room stone mansion built in 1804
Sykesville Colored Schoolhouse Museum	Sykesville	Carroll	Baltimore/Washington	School	
Sykesville Gate House Museum of History	Sykesville	Carroll	Baltimore/Washington	Local history	
System Source Computer Museum	Hunt Valley	Baltimore	Baltimore/Washington	Computer History	Vintage Computing Devices
Taylor's Island Museum	Taylors Island	Dorchester	Eastern Shore	Local history	open by appointment
Teackle Mansion	Princess Anne	Somerset	Eastern Shore	Historic house	Federal era, Neoclassical style house built between 1802 and 1819
Thomas Isaac Log Cabin	Ellicott City	Howard	Baltimore/Washington	Historic house	1780 rustic log cabin
Thomas Point Shoal Lighthouse	Annapolis	Anne Arundel	Baltimore/Washington	Maritime	Guided tours of the lighthouse, arrival by boat
Thomas Stone National Historic Site	Port Tobacco	Charles	Southern	Historic house	1770s house of Thomas Stone, a signer of the Declaration of Independence
Thrasher Carriage Museum	Frostburg	Allegany	Western	Transportation	horse-drawn vehicles include pleasure vehicles, funeral wagons, sleighs, carts, and more in a renovated 19th-century warehouse
Tilghman Watermen's Museum	Tilghman Island	Talbot	Eastern Shore	Maritime	Island's watermen, tools, boat models, art
Tolchester Beach Museum	Tolchester Beach	Kent	Eastern Shore	History	museum about the closed Tolchester Amusement Park
Tory House/107 House	Charlestown	Cecil	Eastern Shore	Historic house	
The Train Room and Museum	Hagerstown	Washington	Western	Railway	one of the largest operating O-gauge model railroad displays in the East Coast, railroad memorabilia, toys
Tucker House (Maryland)	Centreville	Queen Anne's	Eastern Shore	Historic house	1794 home, office of the Queen Anne’s County Historical Society, period rooms
Tudor Hall	Leonardtown	St. Mary's	Southern	Local history	18th-century 14-room mansion, operated by the St. Mary's County Historical Society, exhibits of local history on 1st floor
Tudor Hall	Bel Air	Harford	Baltimore/Washington	Historic house	Mid 19th-century Gothic Revival cottage
Turkey Point Light Station	North East	Cecil	Eastern Shore	Maritime	Located in Elk Neck State Park, lighthouse open for tours
Union Mills Homestead	Westminster	Carroll	Baltimore/Washington	Historic house	Turn-of-the-19th-century house and grist mill
Upper Bay Museum	North East	Cecil	Eastern Shore	Maritime	decoys, gunning rigs, antique marine engines, mahogany miniatures
U.S. Naval Academy Museum	Annapolis	Anne Arundel	Baltimore/Washington	Maritime	American naval history, ship models, flags, marine art, artifacts
Vienna Heritage Museum	Vienna	Dorchester	Eastern Shore	Local history	
Walkersville Southern Railroad Museum	Walkersville	Frederick	Baltimore/Washington	Heritage railways	Heritage railroad and museum
Walters Art Museum	Baltimore	Baltimore City		Art	
Washington County Museum of Fine Arts	Hagerstown	Washington	Western	Art	19th-century and early-20th-century American Art, Old Masters
Washington County Rural Heritage Museum	Boonsboro	Washington	Western	Agriculture	early rural life in Washington County, farm equipment, tools, country store
Waterfront Warehouse	Annapolis	Anne Arundel	Baltimore/Washington	Local history	Historic Annapolis Foundation, exhibits on state and area history
Waterman's Museum	Rock Hall	Kent	Eastern Shore	Maritime	Exhibits on oystering, crabbing, and fishing, reproduction of a shanty house, local carvings and boats
Western Maryland Railway Station	Cumberland	Allegany	Western	Railway	Starting point and museum of the Western Maryland Scenic Railroad
Western Maryland Railway Historical Society Museum	Union Bridge	Carroll	Baltimore/Washington	Railway	Western Maryland Railway artifacts and memorabilia, N-Scale model railroad
William F. Moran, Jr. Museum	Middletown	Frederick	Baltimore/Washington	Technology	working bladesmith shop with museum about hand forged knives and blacksmith metalwork
William Paca House & Garden	Annapolis	Anne Arundel	Baltimore/Washington	Historic house	1760s five-part Georgian brick home of William Paca, a signer of the Declaration of Independence; operated by the Historic Annapolis Foundation
William P. Didusch Center for Urologic History	Linthicum	Anne Arundel	Baltimore/Washington	Medical	Part of the American Urological Association, history and science of urology
Williamsport Town Museum	Williamsport	Washington	Western	Local history	Located in a historic barn
Woodlawn Manor Museum	Sandy Spring	Montgomery	Baltimore/Washington	Living	18th-century brick manor house, stone barn and outbuildings
Wright's Chance	Centreville	Queen Anne's	Eastern Shore	Historic house	1744 plantation house, one room deep and two rooms wide, operated by the Queen Anne’s County Historical Society
Wye Grist Mill	Wye Mills	Queen Anne's	Eastern Shore	Mill	Restored grist mill dating back to the 17th century

== Defunct museums ==
- American Dime Museum, Baltimore, museum of curiosities
- Antique Toy Museum, Baltimore, closed in 2012
- Bagpipe Museum, Ellicott City
- Brannock Maritime Museum, Cambridge - collections merged with Richardson Maritime Museum in 2004
- Christian Heritage Museum, Hagerstown
- Contemporary Museum, Baltimore, closed in 2012
- Fells Point Maritime Museum, Baltimore, collections now at Maryland Center for History and Culture
- Geppi's Entertainment Museum, Baltimore, closed in 2018
- Mount Vernon Museum of Incandescent Lighting, Baltimore, 2002, collection now at Baltimore Museum of Industry,
- Museum of Menstruation and Women's Health, New Carrollton, closed in 1998, now online only,
- National Children's Museum was located in National Harbor from 2012 to 2015
- Peale Museum, Baltimore - holdings transferred to Maryland Historical Society in 1999
- PlayWiseKids, Columbia
- Presidential Pet Museum, moved from Annapolis to President's Park, Williamsburg, VA
- Queen City Transportation Museum, Cumberland, closed in 2011
- Ripken Museum, Aberdeen, memorabilia about baseball player Cal Ripken and family, baseball memorabilia
- Townsend House & Pullen Museum, Catonsville, closed in 2021 when the Catonsville Historical Society dissolved and sold the building.
- U.S. Army Ordnance Museum, Aberdeen, closed Maryland museum location in 2010, moving to Fort Lee (now Fort Gregg-Adams), Virginia, outdoor exhibits still on display
- Waters House History Center, Germantown, closed in 2010
- Wheels of Yesterday, Ocean City, closed in 2012
- Ripley's Believe It or Not! Baltimore An "odditorium" in Harborplace's Light Street Pavilion and opened in June 2012. Closed permanently in May 2020.

== See also ==
- List of museums in Baltimore
- List of historical societies in Maryland
- Nature Centers in Maryland
