= Arts and culture of Maryland =

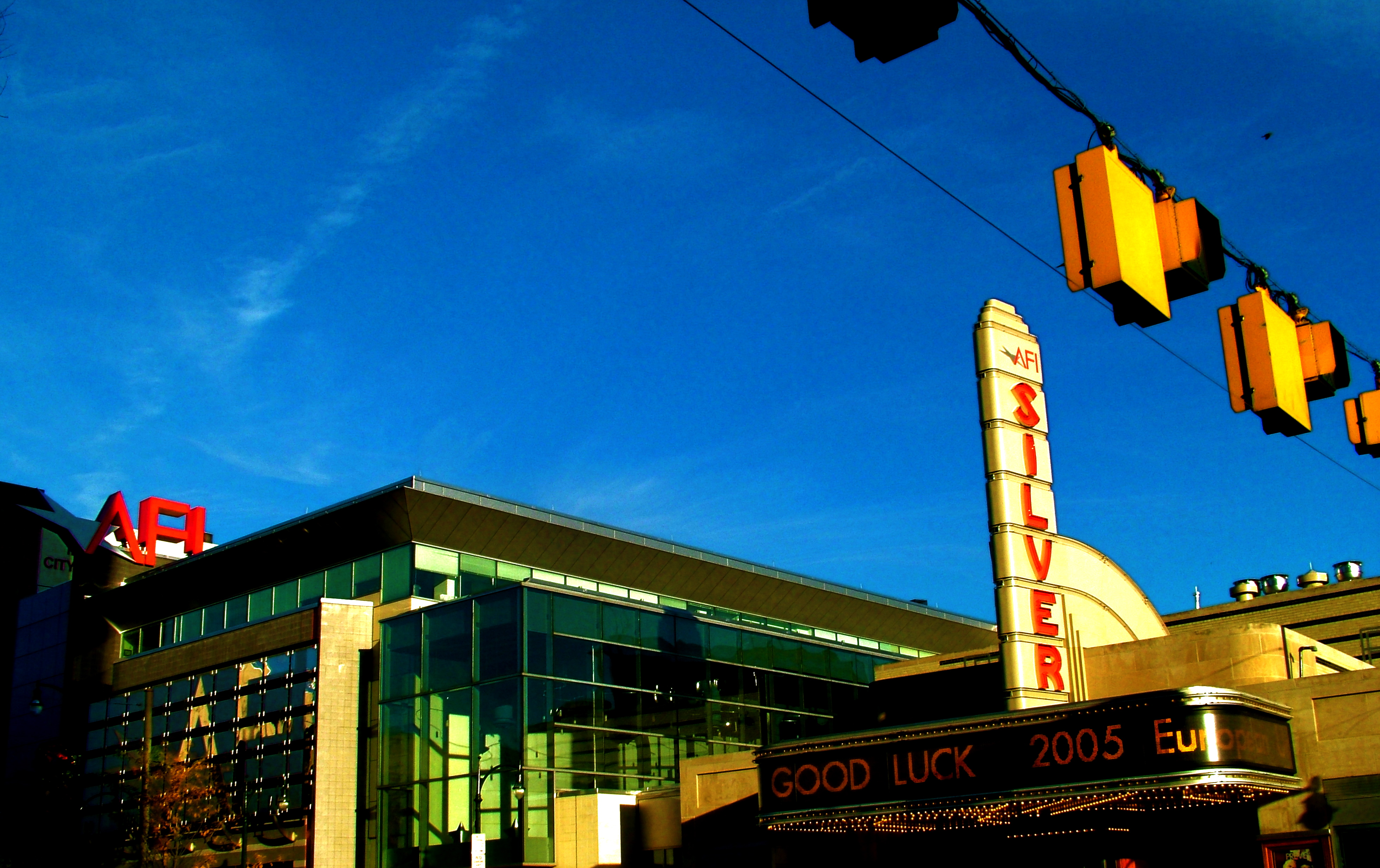
American Film Institute Silver Theater

The arts and culture of Maryland are varied; they are not just limited to metropolitan areas, but can also be experienced throughout the state. There is an eclectic mix of southern and northern American cultures influenced by its foundation as a Catholic colony.

The main cultural centers include The American Film Institute, located in Silver Spring; The Filmore, located within the central offices of Discovery Communications; The Columbia Center for Theatrical Arts, located in Columbia; and The Strathmore, a cultural and artistic institution, located in Bethesda. The Strathmore was founded in 1981, and consists of two venues: the "Mansion" and the "Music Center".

== Languages ==
English is the most widely spoken language; however, Spanish is spoken in small regions within the Washington, DC - Baltimore corridor. 87.4% of the population speaks only English at home, while 4.7% speak Spanish. Of the remaining 7.9%, no other languages are spoken by more than 1% of the population; of these, French and Chinese are the most common. Southern Maryland, the Eastern Shore and Western Maryland have Southern accents and are influenced by Southern culture.

== Music ==
There are several music festivals in Maryland. A jazz festival is held in Silver Spring on the second Saturday in September. In Takoma Park, a folk festival has been held annually since 1978. This festival was founded by Sam Abbott, former mayor of the city and a civil-rights activist. In addition to hosting concerts by musicians from around the area on several stages, the festival also celebrates cultural diversity which exists throughout the region, with a wide variety of ethnic food and crafts. There is also a street festival held annually over Memorial Day weekend in Rockville that includes a number of concerts over the course of the three-day festivities.

== Literature ==
The literature of Maryland includes fiction, poetry, and nonfiction. Some Maryland authors are: John Barth, H. L. Mencken, and Edgar Allan Poe.

== Media ==
There are several weekly newspapers in Montgomery County: The Gazette (with versions for Germantown, Silver Spring and Takoma), and an information website called Germantown Pulse, and the Washington Hispanic newspaper.

Popular blogs for Baltimore culture, arts, and history include Baltimore Brew, Baltimore Fishbowl, Ghosts of Baltimore, and Baltimore Heritage.

== Libraries ==
Maryland has hundreds of libraries. Each county has one or more library per city and each has their own library system. Each college and university has its own library as well. Maryland's 24 public library systems deliver public education for everyone in Maryland through a curriculum that is composed of three pillars: Self-Directed Education (books and materials in all formats, e-resources), Research Assistance & Instruction (individualized research assistance, classes for students of all ages), and Instructive & Enlightening Experiences (e.g., Summer Reading Clubs, author events). Many of the library systems have established formalized partnerships with other educational institutions in their counties and regions.

== Recreation ==
Maryland has hundreds of playgrounds, playing fields and basketball tennis courts available in each county. Many of the parks are public, but some belong to house owners or other private associations. In addition to public parks in urban areas, Maryland hosts numerous forms of outdoor recreation. These include access to the Appalachian Trail, mountain biking in Patapsco Valley State Park, and rock climbing in Rocks State Park (among other places).

== Museums ==
- Beall-Dawson House
- Clara Barton National Historic Site
- Gaithersburg Community Museum
- Latvian Museum
- National Capital Trolley Museum
- Strathmore (Maryland)
- Sandy Spring Museum
- Glenstone
- National Museum of Health and Medicine
- The Art Gallery at the University of Maryland
- Washington County Museum of Fine Arts
- Museum of Eastern Shore Culture, formerly the Ward Museum of Wildfowl Art
- Rose Hill Manor
- Piscataway Indian Museum
- Patent Research Refuge
- National Museum of Language
- National Children's Museum
- Jefferson Patterson Park & Museum
- Government House (Maryland)
- Glen-view Farm
- Discovery Station
- Deep Creek Lake State Park
- Backwater National Wildlife Refuge
- Benjamin Banneker Museum
- Calvert Marine Museum

== See also ==
- Arts and culture of Washington, D.C.
- Outline of culture
- Outline of Maryland

== Bibliography ==
- Federal Writers' Project (1940), Maryland: a Guide to the Old Line State, American Guide Series, New York: Oxford University Press, ISBN 9781603540193 – via Google Books
