= Ward brothers =

Ward brothers may refer to:

- Ward brothers (carvers), American carvers
- Ward brothers (rowers), four American rowers who were brothers
- The Ward Brothers, a British band
- Ward Brothers' House and Shop, a historic home located in Maryland, U.S.
- The Ward brothers, four brothers who were accused of murder and later featured in the documentary film Brother's Keeper
