= Stonestreet Museum of 19th Century Medicine =

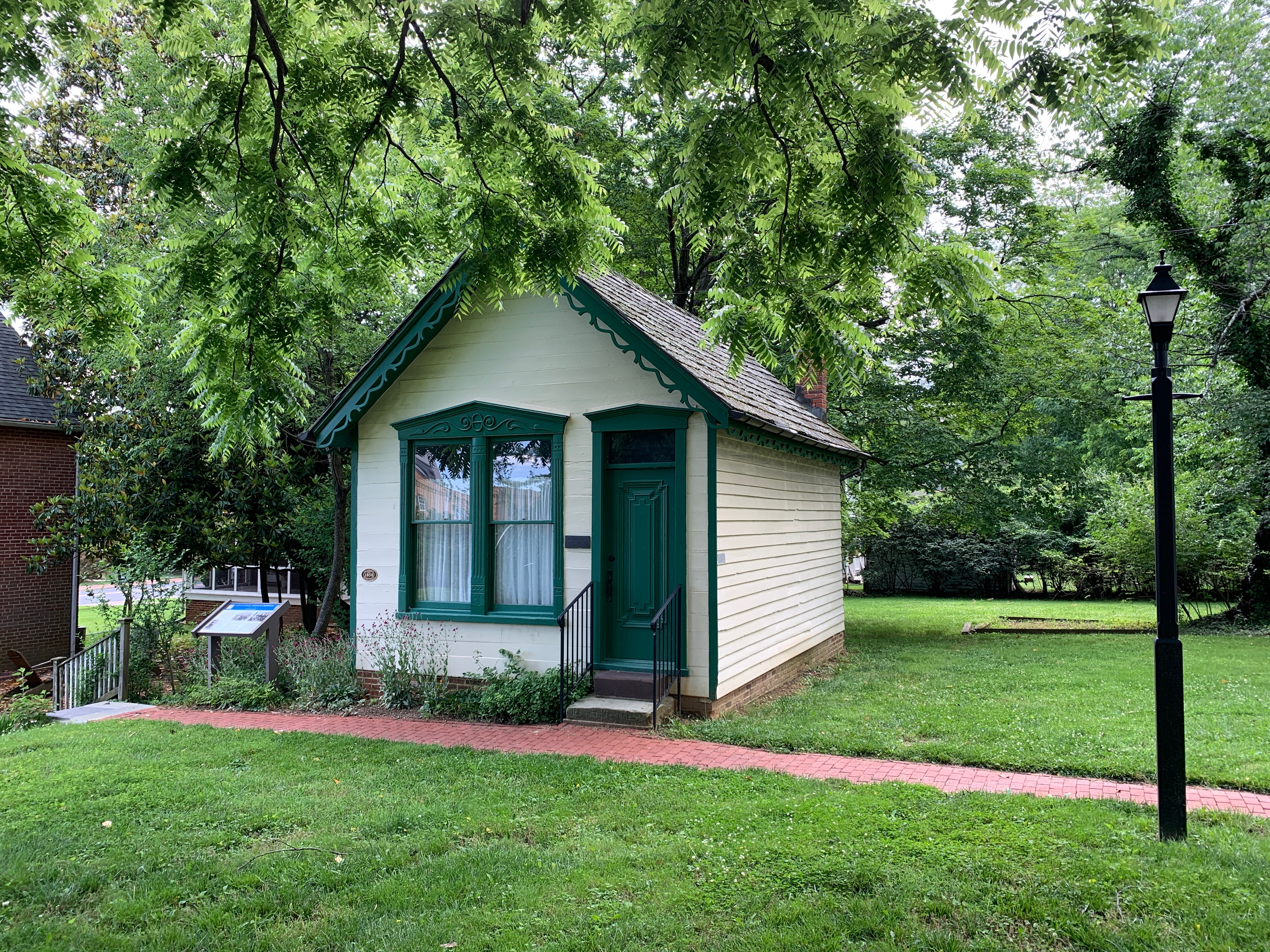
- Interactive map of Stonestreet Museum of 19th Century Medicine
- 39°5′4.6″N 77°9′20.3″W
- Location: 103 West Montgomery Avenue, Rockville, Maryland

History
- Built: 1852

Site notes
- Architectural style: Gothic Revival
- Owner: City of Rockville

Stonestreet Museum of 19th Century Medicine is a one-story mid-19th century wood-frame building displaying medical and pharmaceutical tools, furniture, and books from the 19th and early 20th centuries and managed by the Montgomery County Historical Society. It originally stood at Monroe Street and Montgomery Avenue in Rockville, Maryland, as the office of Dr. Edward E. Stonestreet and was moved in 1972 to its current location next to the Beall-Dawson House.

While Edward E. Stonestreet was completing his medical studies at the University of Maryland School of Medicine, his parents, Adelaide and Samuel T. Stonestreet, constructed an office for him in 1852 on the property of their residence in Rockville. He began his medical practice in this building in 1853 and continued to receive patients here until he died in 1903. In addition to practicing medicine, Stonestreet served on the Rockville City Council and served on the boards of the Medical Society of Montgomery County, Rockville Cemetery Association, Montgomery County Agricultural Society, and the Mutual Building Association of Montgomery County. His family was active in the Methodist Episcopal Church South in Rockville and his daughters dedicated the "Christ Knocking at the Door" stained glass window in his honor shortly after his death.

In 1904, the Montgomery County School Board purchased the home of Dr. Stonestreet for the site of the new Montgomery County High School (now the location of Americana Apartments). The School Board demolished Stonestreet's house but retained his medical office as a museum and later as a laboratory for the high school. In 1920, the building became Rockville’s first public library and served in that capacity until 1936. After World War II, it was relocated to the Agricultural Fair Grounds, where the Rockville Volunteer Fire Department and the Boy Scouts used it for meetings. In 1972, the Volunteer Fire Department, the City of Rockville, and the Montgomery County Historical Society moved the structure to a site adjacent to the Beall–Dawson House, a historic house museum operated by the Historical Society. In 1973, it was officially dedicated as a museum focused on Dr. Stonestreet and the history of 19th-century medicine. Between 1994 and 1996, the structure was moved again within the Beall-Dawson property due to ground instability. In 2018, the exhibit was rededicated and formally named the “Stonestreet Museum of 19th Century Medicine.”
