= Philogelos =

Ancient Greek collection of jokes

Philogelos (Ancient Greek: Φιλόγελως, "Love of Laughter"), also titled or subtitled The Jests of Hierocles and Philagrius, is a Greek-language book published in late antiquity that is the oldest known surviving collection of jokes.

== Context ==
Although the Philogelos is the oldest surviving joke book, there are known to be prior joke books that have since become lost. Athenaeus wrote in the Deipnosophistae that Philip II of Macedon paid for a social club in Athens to write down its members' jokes for him, and joke books are mentioned by characters in Persa and Stichus, two comedies by the 2nd century BC Roman playwright Plautus.

=== Attribution ===
Authorship of the Philogelos is traditionally attributed to two men, Hierocles and Philagrius (also spelled Hierokles and Philagros), who are otherwise unattested and have no known works. It has been posited that the Hierocles mentioned is Neoplatonist philosopher Hierocles of Alexandria, but there is no evidence to connect the two beyond similarity of name. If Hierocles and Philagrius were indeed the creators of the book, it is more likely that they compiled and edited existing jokes, rather than writing all the jokes themselves.

The Suda, a 10th century Byzantine encyclopedia, attributes authorship to a 5th century BC comic playwright named Philistion of Nicaea, who was allegedly a contemporary of Socrates and a blood relative of Philemon.

The exact time of publication is unknown. According to William Berg, who published an English translation of it in 2008, the language used indicates that it may have been written in the fourth century AD. Joke #62 mentions the Secular Games held by Philip the Arab marking the 1,000th anniversary of the founding of Rome, implying that the jokes were not compiled until after the year 248 AD.

== Contents ==
The Philogelos consists of 264 jokes, although some are variations or repeats of prior jokes. They are sorted by the stock characters they feature, including the dumb or absent-minded scholar (Ancient Greek: σχολαστικός), the con man, the misanthrope, the witty commentator (Ancient Greek: εὐτράπελος), doctors and patients, teachers and students, and husbands and wives. There are also ethnic jokes about Cymaeans, Sidonians, and Abderites, where they are stereotyped as unintelligent, superstitious, and literal-minded.

=== Joke #1 ===
The first joke in the collection has long been described as incomprehensible, nonsensical, or missing a punchline:

A scholar ordered a silversmith to prepare a lantern. When the latter asked how big he wanted it, he replied "Like this, for eight people!"

The most common interpretation, first argued by Giovanni Pontano, is that the scholar is simply giving the silversmith a bizarre and useless answer. Felice (2013) argues that the word for lantern (Ancient Greek: λύχνος) could also refer to an edible species of fish (albeit different from a modern lanternfish), as attested in Strabo's Geographica, making the joke a play on words about the meaning of λύχνος, in which the scholar orders one at a silversmith's the same way he'd order one at a fishmonger's. Meanwhile, Berg (2008) has no trouble translating the joke:

A student dunce orders a lamp from the silversmith. "How big a lamp do you want me to make?" asks the man. "Big enough for eight people to see by," responds the dunce.

== Modern day ==
In 2008, British TV personality and comedian Jim Bowen tested the material on a modern audience. One of the jokes in Philogelos has been described as "an ancestor of Monty Python's famous Dead Parrot comedy sketch." Comedian Jimmy Carr has said that some of the jokes are "strikingly similar" to modern ones.

The US National Museum of Language showcases a virtual exhibit, Philogelos: The First Joke Book, featuring cartoons created from translations of the Philogelos collection.

== See also ==
- Roman jokes
- Poetics (Aristotle), Aristotle discusses the nature of tragedy and comedy, but the book on the latter is lost.
