= Ward Brothers' House and Shop =

Historic house in Maryland, United States

- U.S. National Register of Historic Places
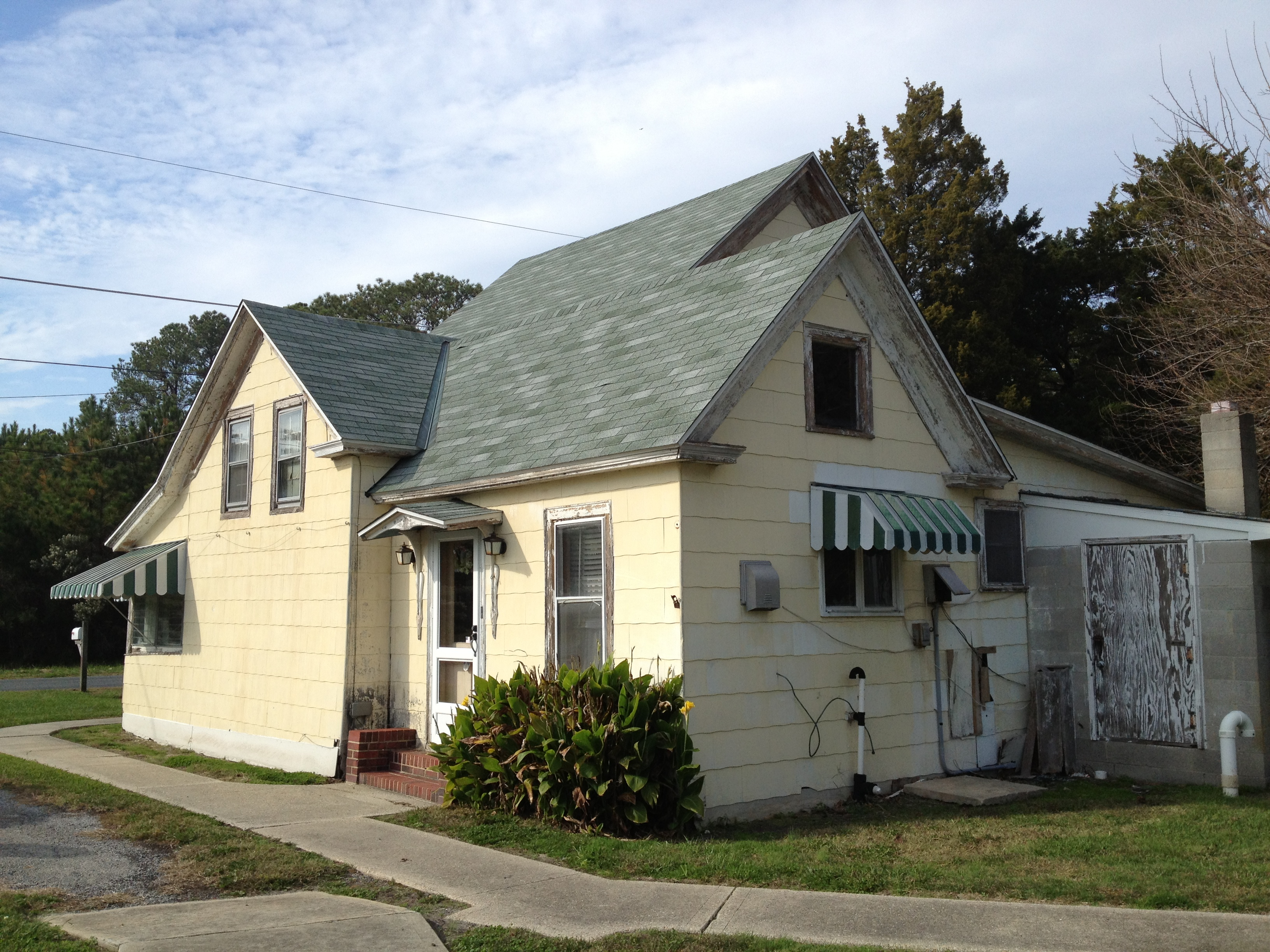
- The Ward Brothers' house in 2012

- Location within Maryland Location within the United States
- Location: 3199 Sackertown Rd., Crisfield, Maryland
- Coordinates: 37°58′13″N 75°50′42″W
- Area: 0.7 acres (0.28 ha)
- Built: 1880, 1918
- Architectural style: 1-room-plan, Victorian trim
- NRHP reference No.: 94000790
- Added to NRHP: November 21, 1997

The Ward Brothers' House and Shop is a historic home located at Crisfield, Somerset County, Maryland, United States. It consists of a two-story, two-bay, one-room plan frame dwelling built around 1880, and the brothers' barber shop, a composite building composed of individual structures grouped together behind a long false front. The brothers Lemuel T. Ward, Jr. (1896–1985) and Steve Ward (1895–1976) are recognized as the fathers of the modern movement in decorative wildlife, or decoy, carving in America.

The Ward Brothers' House and Shop was listed on the National Register of Historic Places in 1997. The house was demolished in November 2013.
