= Roman jokes =

Ancient Roman humour

- Type of joke: Rhetorical device
- Target of joke: Romans

Ancient Roman jokes, as described by Cicero and Quintilian, are best employed as a rhetorical device. Many of them are apparently taken from real-life trials conducted by famous advocates, such as Cicero. Jokes were also found scrawled upon washroom walls of Pompeii as graffiti. Romans sought laughter by attending comic plays (such as those of Plautus) and mimes (such as those of Publilius Syrus). Jokes from these sources usually depended on sexual themes. Cicero believed that humour ought to be based upon "ambiguity, the unexpected, wordplay, understatement, irony, ridicule, silliness, and pratfalls". Roman jokes also depended on certain stock characters and stereotypes, especially regarding foreigners, as can be seen within Plautus' Poenulus.

Roman culture, which was heavily influenced by the Greeks, had also been in conversation with Greek humour.

== Examples ==
One of the oldest Roman jokes, which is based on a fictitious story and survived alive to this time, is told by Macrobius in his Saturnalia: (4th century AD, but the joke itself is probably several centuries older):

Some provincial man has come to Rome, and walking on the streets was drawing everyone's attention, being a real double of the emperor Augustus. The emperor, having brought him to the palace, looks at him and then asks:
-Tell me, young man, did your mother come to Rome anytime?
The reply was:
-She never did. But my father frequently was here.

(The modern version is that an aristocrat, having met his exact double, asks: "Was your mother a housemaid in our palace?" "No, my father was a gardener there").

An example of a joke based on double meaning is recorded in Gellius (2nd century AD):

A man, standing before a censor, is about to testify, whether he has a wife. The censor asks:
-Do you have, in all your honesty, a wife?
-I surely do, but not in all my honesty.

(the pun is in the expression used for in all your honesty - orig. ex animi tui sententia, typically used in oaths - which can also be understood as to your liking).

Some of the jokes are about fortune-tellers and the like. An example (1st century BC):

A runner going to participate in the Olympic games had a dream, that he was driving a quadriga. Early in the morning he goes to a dream interpreter for an explanation. The reply is:
-You will win, that meant the speed and the strength of the horses.
But, to be sure about this, the runner visits another dream interpreter. This one replies:
-You will lose. Don't you understand, that four ones came before you?

== See also ==
- Philogelos, an ancient Greek joke book.
- Poetics (Aristotle), Aristotle discusses the nature of tragedy and comedy, but the book on the latter is lost.
