= Price–Miller House =

Historic house in Maryland, United States

- U.S. National Register of Historic Places
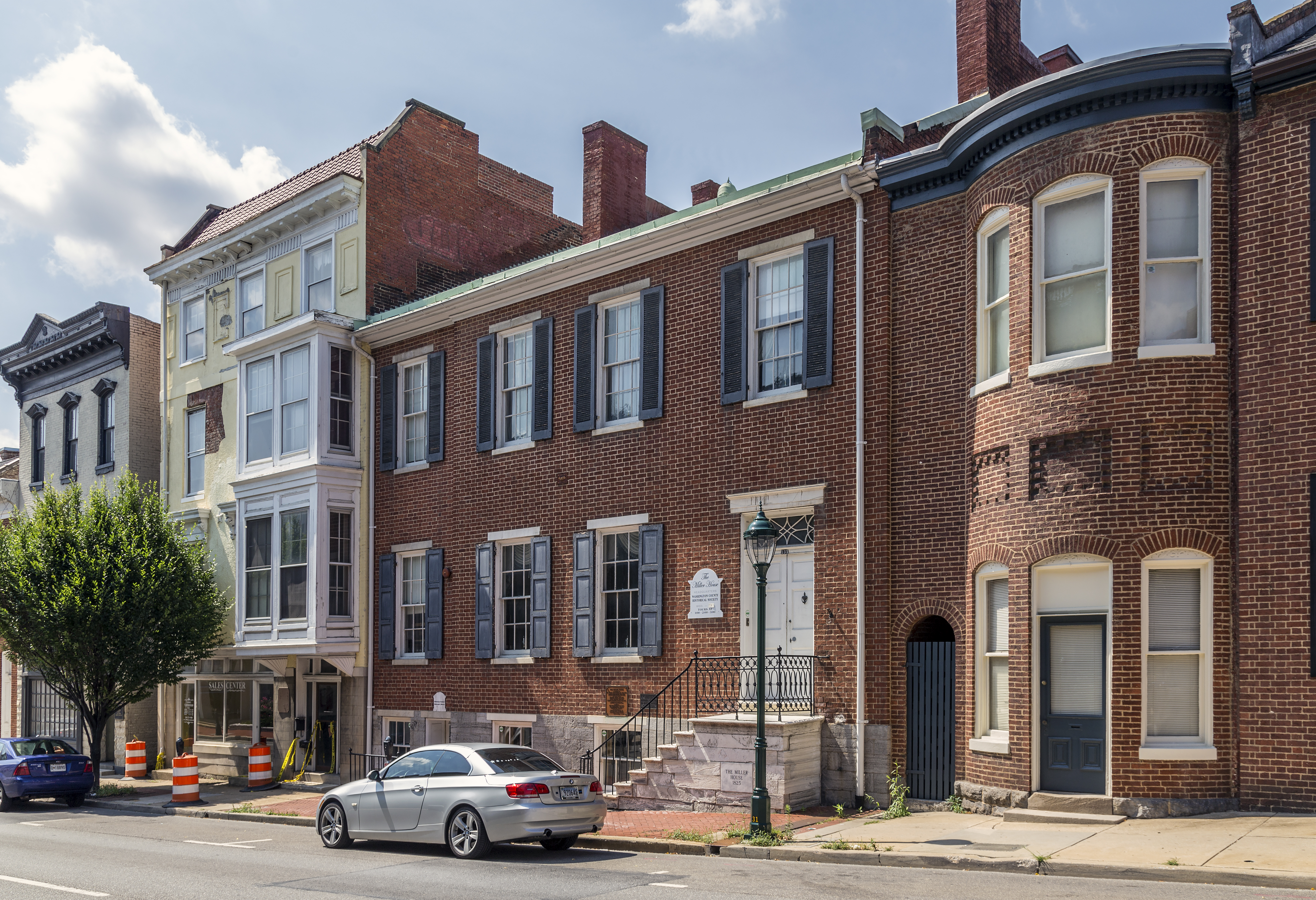

- Location within Maryland Location within the United States
- Location: 131–135 W. Washington St., Hagerstown, Maryland
- Coordinates: 39°38′37.36″N 77°43′25.32″W
- Area: 0.4 acres (0.16 ha)
- Built: 1825
- Architectural style: Neo-classical
- NRHP reference No.: 76001018
- Added to NRHP: May 24, 1976

The Price–Miller House is a historic home located in Hagerstown, Washington County, Maryland, United States. It is a 2 1/2-story, brick Neoclassical-style townhouse that rests on a high-cut stone foundation, and was built circa 1824–1825.

The Price–Miller House was listed on the National Register of Historic Places in 1976. Since 1966, it has served as the headquarters of the Washington County Historical Society and home to the Miller House Museum, a historic house and local history museum.

== History ==
=== Price Family (1825–1844) ===
The main portion of the Price–Miller House was built between 1824 and 1825 for William Price (died 1868), a prominent attorney. Price purchased the lot in 1823, and used the building as both a family home and the site for his Hagerstown law practice. Price served as the United States Attorney for the District of Maryland from 1862 to 1865 and 1866–1867 and was appointed to his first term by Abraham Lincoln. Price was the father of architect Bruce Price and the paternal grandfather of author and etiquette authority Emily Post. The Price family lived in the house until 1842; the law practice was operated by a partner of William Price, William Beverly Clark, until 1844.

=== Neill Family (1844–1911) ===
In 1844, William Price sold the house to Alexander Neill, Jr. (1808–1865) who served as a president of the Hagerstown Bank and also a local attorney. The Neill family lived in the home until 1911, encompassing three generations of the family. The deed passed to Alexander Neill III (1844–1910), an attorney and politician who served as a member of the Maryland House of Delegates in 1870 and auditor of the Washington County Court in 1876. The deed for the home then passed to Alexander Neill IV (1875–1911), and his heirs sold the house upon his death from a brain tumor in 1911.

=== Miller Family (1911–1966) ===
The heirs of Alexander Neill IV sold the house to Dr. Victor Davis Miller, Jr. (1876–1955) a local physician. Dr. Miller moved into the house with his wife, Nellie Baechtell Loose Miller (1878–1965), and two children, Helen Miller Mathias (1907–1994) and Victor Davis Miller III (1909–1968). A third child, Henry Loose Miller (1912–2012), was born in the home a year after the family relocated. Dr. Miller expanded the Miller House with a three-story, one-bay addition that was finished in 1915. In addition, Dr. Miller finished the existing basement areas of the house. The basement and addition were used as a private medical practice, housing four practitioners in addition to Dr. Miller. The Millers lived in the home until the early 1960s, and upon Nellie Miller's death in 1965, the deed was split between the three Miller children. Victor Davis Miller and Henry Loose Miller donated their two-thirds of the deed to the Washington County Historical Society, and assisted in securing the final third in 1966.

== Miller House Museum ==
The house serves as the headquarters of the Washington County Historical Society and is known as the Miller House Museum.
