= The Gazette (Virginia) =

- Type: Daily newspaper
- Owner: Paxton Media Group
- Language: English
- Headquarters: Galax, Virginia, U.S.
- Website: www.pmg-va.com/galax_gazette/

The Gazette is a newspaper based in Galax, Virginia. In 2021, Landmark Media Enterprises sold the newspaper to Paxton Media Group.
