= Bagpipe Museum (United States) =

Former bagpipe museum in Ellicott City, Maryland

The Bagpipe Museum is a currently-defunct museum previously located in Ellicott City, Maryland, United States. The museum closed in 2009, and is closed as of 2025.

The museum displayed a collection of over a hundred bagpipes from throughout Europe, and maintained a large collection of bagpipe recordings and publications, as well as reproducing rare sheet music for the pipes.

The Bagpipe Museum, which opened in 1997, closed down in the late 2000s when the historic mill in which it was located was sold to developers. The collection has been maintained and there are tentative plans to re-establish the museum at a new location.

== See also ==
- List of music museums
