= Mount Aventine =

Historic district in Maryland, United States

- U.S. National Register of Historic Places
- U.S. Historic district
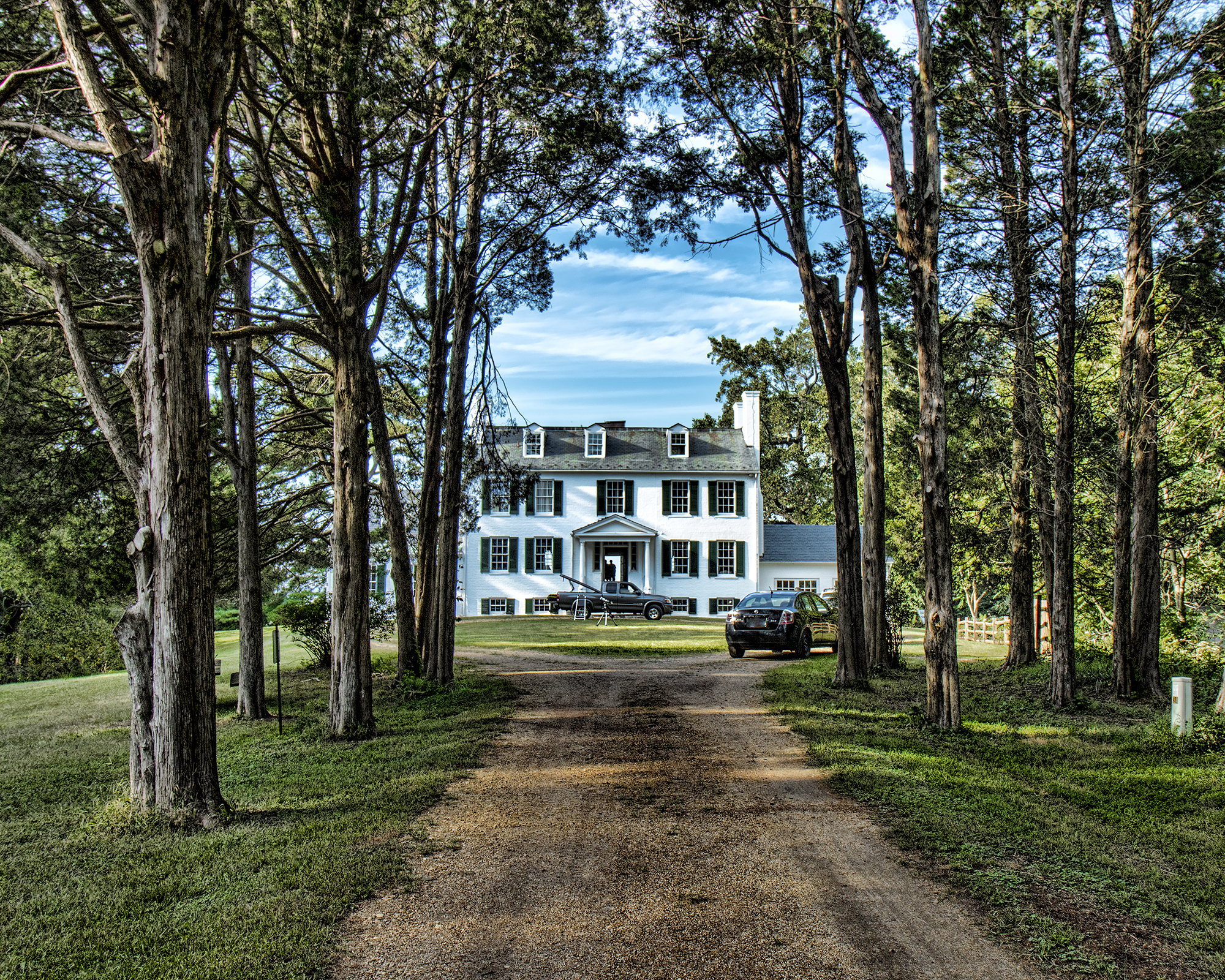
- Front of the Chapman House

- Location within Maryland Location within the United States
- Nearest city: Bryans Road, Maryland
- Coordinates: 38°37′4″N 77°7′3″W
- Architectural style: Greek Revival
- NRHP reference No.: 94001328
- Added to NRHP: April 18, 1996

Mount Aventine is a farm complex and national historic district located along the Potomac River in Bryans Road, Charles County, Maryland. The complex includes the main house; a second-quarter 19th century Greek Revival-influenced brick house. It was enlarged about 1860 to its present five-bay, center-passage, 2 1/2-story appearance. Also on the property are a 19th-century frame smokehouse, the site of another 19th-century house complex, late-19th /early-20th-century agricultural outbuildings, house and dairy barn complex built about 1900, historic roadbeds, a family cemetery, and sites of a 19th-century fishery and an 18th-century house.

Its former cupola was used as a signal station by the Federal government during the American Civil War. The Chapman family owned the Mt. Aventine tract from 1751 until 1916, and the ferry operated by them was one of several important crossings of the Potomac River connecting Northern Virginia to Maryland.

It was added to the National Register of Historic Places in 1996, and since 1998 has been preserved as part of Chapman State Park.

The house is open for tours during special events hosted by the Friends of Chapman State Park.

== Gallery ==
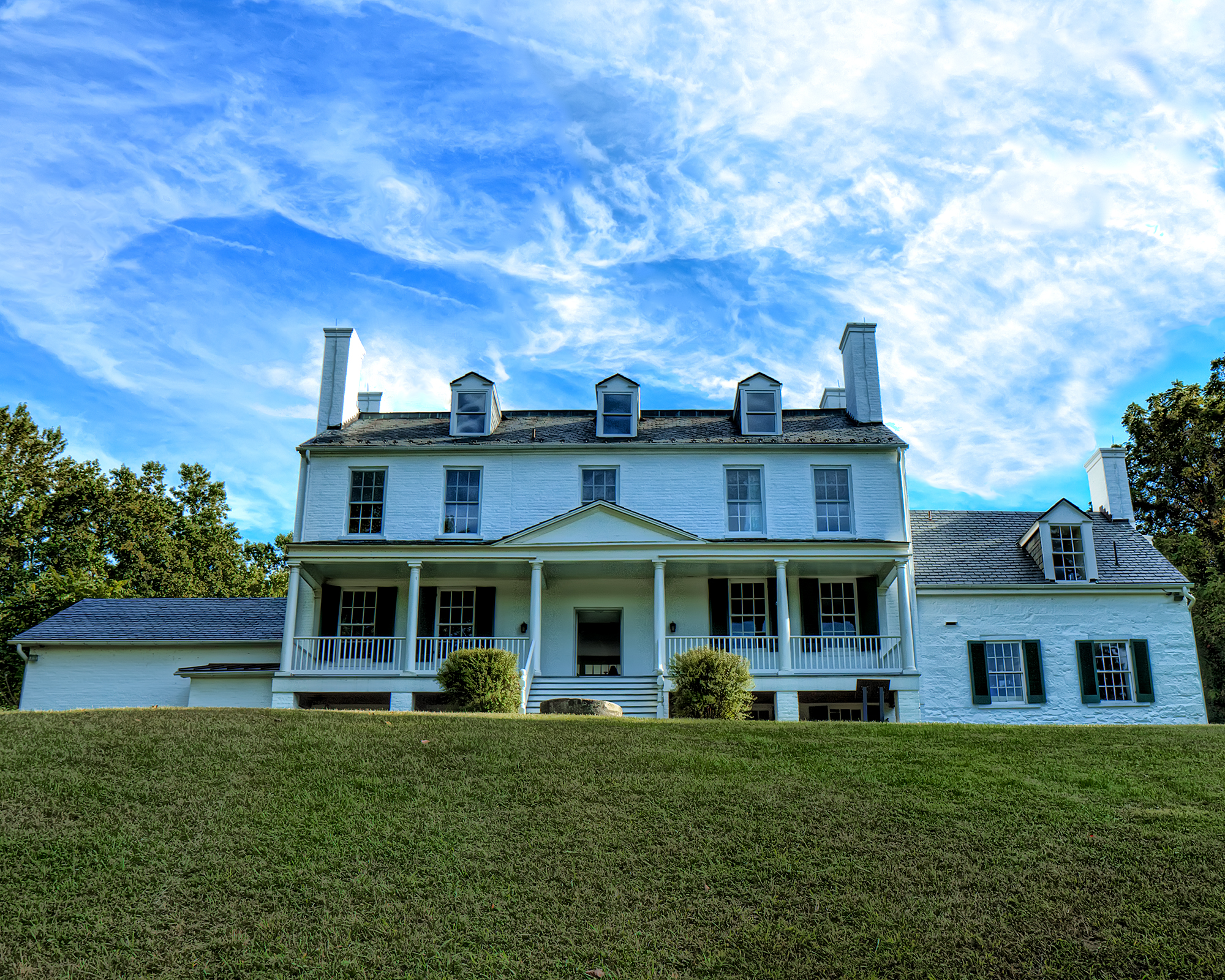
Rear of the Chapman House

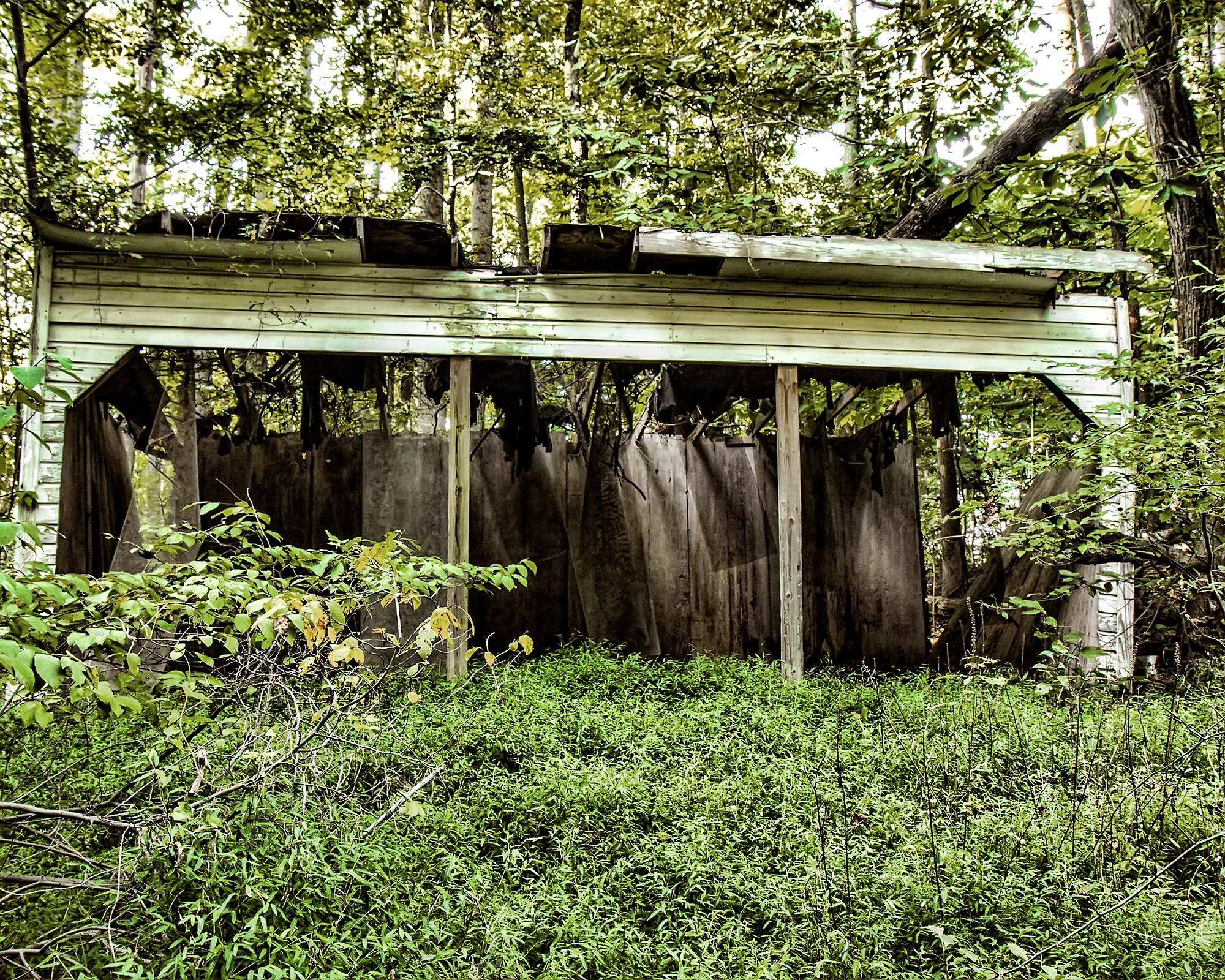
Abandoned barn
