= Chapman State Park (Maryland) =

State park in Charles County, Maryland

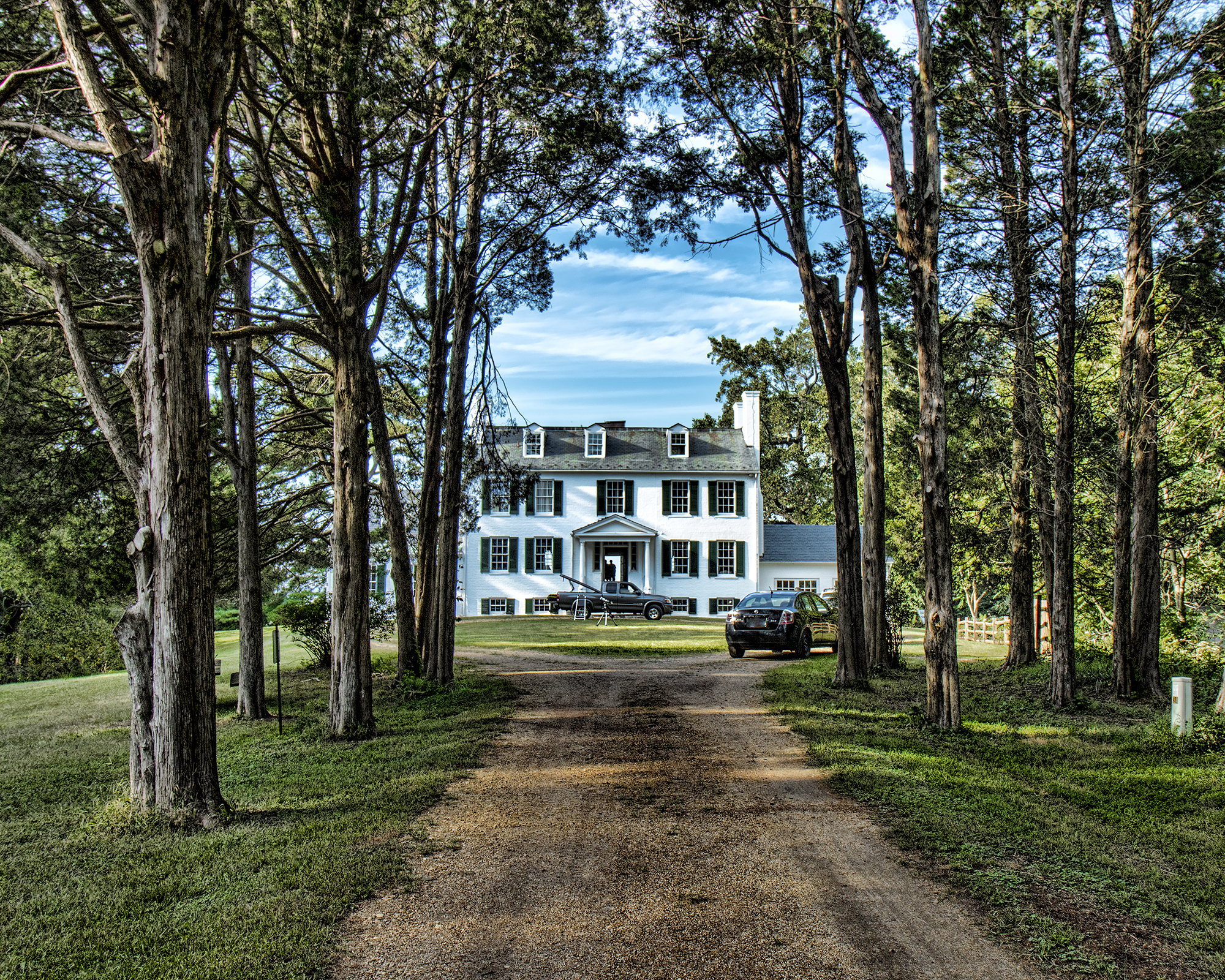
- Mount Aventine

- Location within Maryland
- Interactive map of Chapman State Park
- Location: Charles County, Maryland, United States
- Nearest town: Indian Head, Maryland
- Coordinates: 38°37′17″N 77°07′09″W
- Area: 829 acres (335 ha)
- Elevation: 3 ft (0.91 m)
- Established: 1998
- Administrator: Maryland Department of Natural Resources
- Designation: Maryland state park
- Website: Official website

Chapman State Park is a Maryland state park bordering the Potomac River in Charles County, Maryland. The state park preserves the mansion and grounds of Mount Aventine, the historic home of the Chapman family, who had significant ties to many of the Founding Fathers. The State of Maryland purchased Mount Aventine and established Chapman State Park in 1998. The park's diverse, heavily wooded biosphere is home to many rare and disjunct plant and animal species. Several of the park's trees have been nominated for state and national big tree champion status. Recreational features include fishing, hunting, and several miles of hiking trails.
