= Tilghman Watermen's Museum =

- Lee House
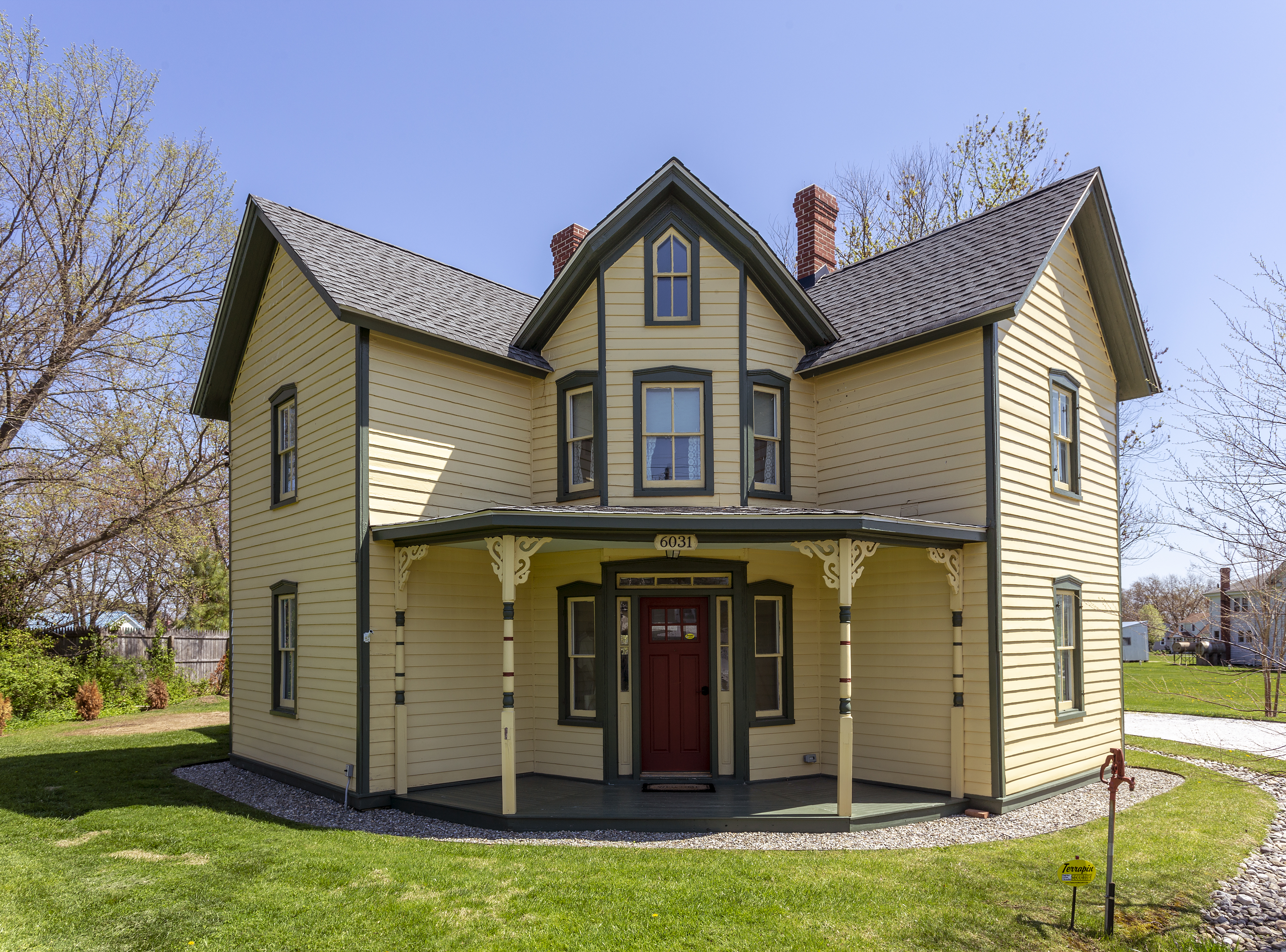
- Lee House, Tilghman Watermen's Museum

- Location within Maryland Location within the United States
- Former name: Tilghman Island Victorian House
- Established: June 2008
- Location: Tilghman Island, Maryland, US
- Coordinates: 38°43′14″N 76°20′1″W
- Type: Maritime museum
- Founders: Hall and Mary Kellogg
- Website: The Tilghman Watermen's Museum

The Tilghman Watermen's Museum (established 2008) records the maritime traditions of the people of Tilghman Island and the unique way of life of the watermen who lived on the island. It is located on Tilghman Island, Maryland, United States.

Originally located in an old barbershop at 5778 Tilghman Island Road, the museum relocated as of June 2015 to the Lee House, a historic home off MD 33. Lee House is the best preserved example of a style of vernacular architecture unique to Tilghman Island, Maryland, known as a "W" facade house.

== Watermen of Tilghman Island ==
External videos
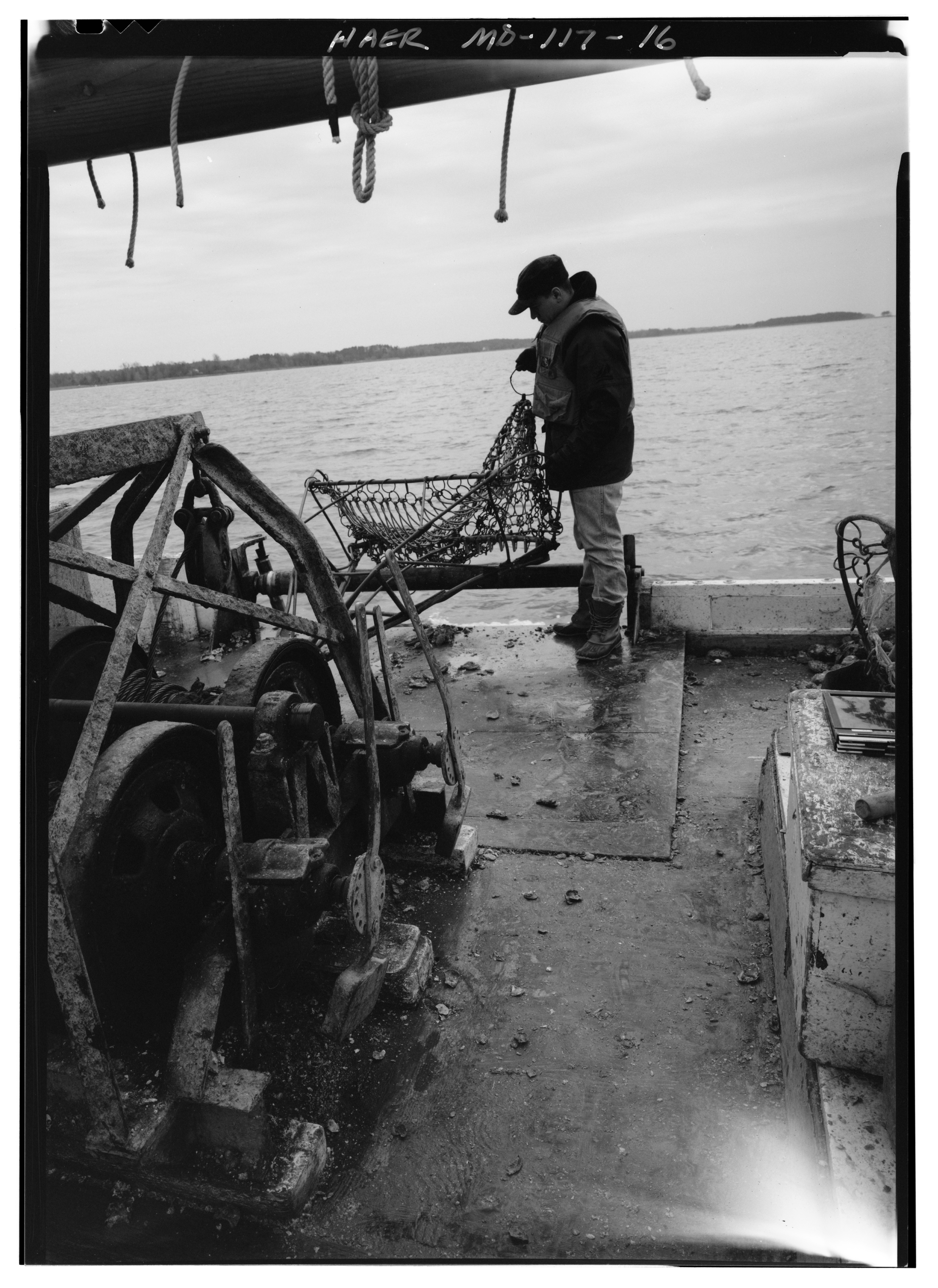
- "They say once you get that oyster mud under your fingernails, you'll always come back", Growing up on Tilghman (Promo), Tilghman Island Museum

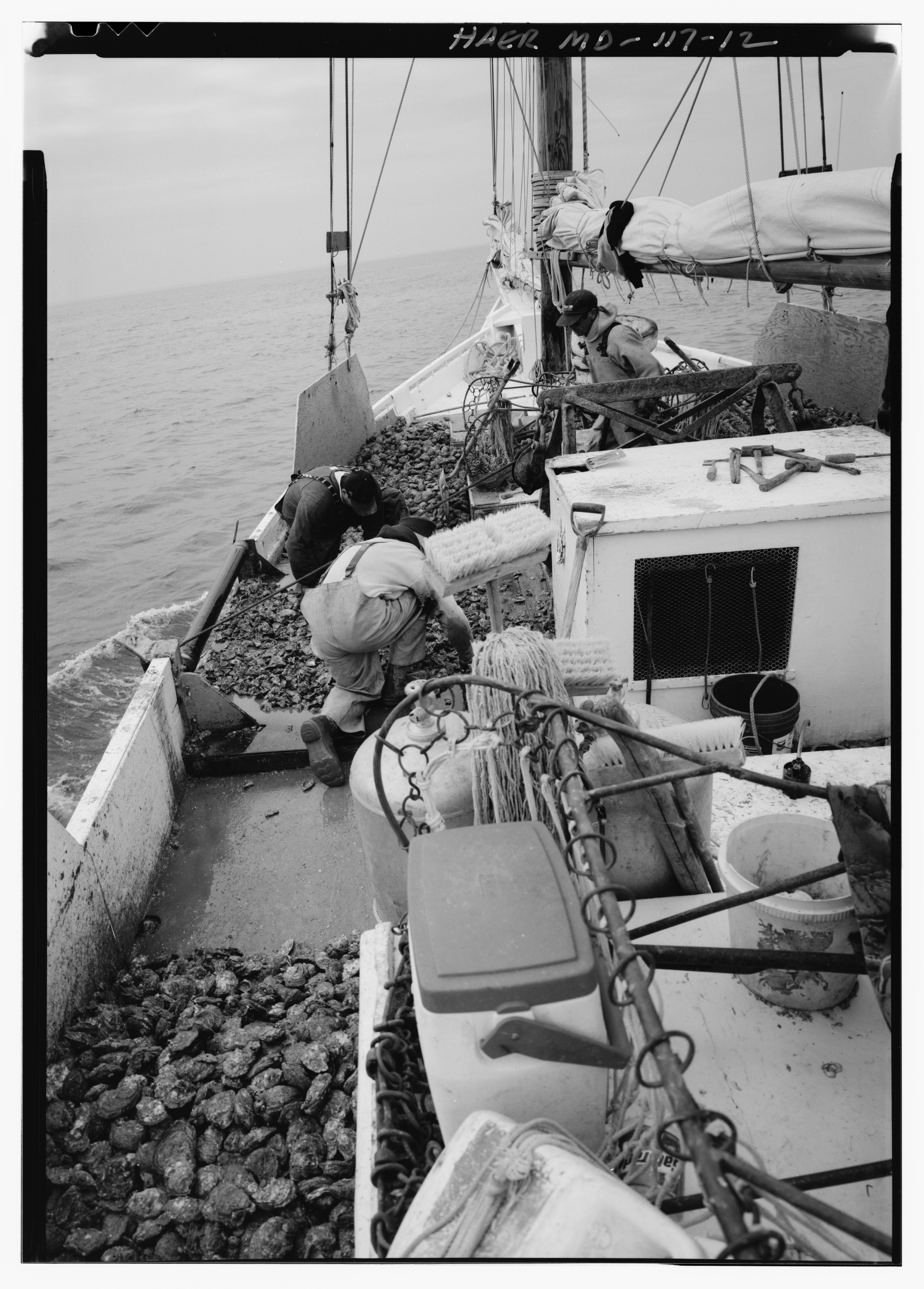
Sorting oysters on the skipjack Kathryn

When the Chesapeake Bay area was first settled in the 1600s, it was a bountiful source of fish and other seafood. The area around Tilghman Island had particularly rich oyster beds. Watermen earned their livelihood from a variety of tasks: crabbing, oystering, tonging and dredging, seafood packing and canning, and guiding hunting parties. The maritime industry of shipbuilding became established on the island, and several types of boats developed for use in local conditions. Log canoes with sails, adapted from the canoes of Powhatan tribes, are local to the area. So are skipjacks, two-masted sailboats used for oystering on Chesapeake Bay. Skipjacks have remained the primary boat for oystering due to a Maryland law banning the use of motors for oystering.

Most watermen live in small waterfront communities like Tilghman Island. Independent fishermen who own their own boat and equipment, they work long days and may travel miles to reach fishing or harvesting grounds. Crabbing occurs in the summer; oystering in the winter; and fishing throughout the spring, fall and winter.

== Development of the Museum ==
The idea of creating a museum specific to Tilghman Island arose in 2007, when a group of residents became involved in an effort to preserve the Kathryn, a Chesapeake bay skipjack. One result of this work was an increased awareness of the historical record of the local area. The Tilghman Island Museum opened in June 2008, under the direction of Hall and Mary Kellogg, local residents.

Initially, the museum focused on collecting and presenting oral histories to record the way of life of the watermen on Tilghman Island. The video Growing up on Tilghman (2010), scripted and directed by Jennifer Shea and filmed by Peter Carroll Productions, draws on these oral histories and has been shown on Maryland Public Television. Over time, the museum's displays have expanded to include artifacts related to the watermen and the island, scale boat models, and local artwork. The area is particularly popular with artists and photographers including Marc Castelli, Tilghman Hemsley IV and Walt Bartman.

The museum's first location was an old barbershop, located at 5778 Tilghman Island Road. Once the workplace of islanders Duckey Scharch and Johnny Moore, it retained the original mirrors and fittings of the barbershop. However, as a rented location, it offered few options for expansion. The Kelloggs purchased the Lee House, a local historical building, in 2010, and obtained a grant for $90,000 from the Maryland Heritage Areas Authority towards its restoration.

== Lee House ==
The Lee House was listed on the Maryland Historical Trust Inventory of Historic Properties in May 1977 under the name "Tilghman Island Victorian House" (T-859, previously T-366). It is located about half a mile south of the Knapps Narrows Bridge, off Route 33.

The Lee House dates to around 1890. It is the best preserved example of an architecturally significant style of vernacular architecture unique to Tilghman Island, Maryland, known as a "W" facade house. The Maryland government reports that about thirteen such houses were built between 1890 and 1900. The Tilghman Watermen's Museum indicates that twelve such houses were located on Tilghman Island, with two others in Sherwood, Maryland. Of these, only five are left.

Lee House is a 2 1/2-story, frame house in an "L" shape, with two equal frame wings. In the angle of the "L" is a three-bay entrance projection with a central doorway and sash windows on either side. According to local inhabitants of the area, the unique design allowed for air flow throughout the house, regardless of the direction of the breeze.

The Maryland Historic Trust inventory notes that the house at one time belonged to Becky Lee. The Lee family are credited as the original owners, living in the Lee House until the 1930s. Then the house was inherited by Leona Garvin Harrison. Harrison lived nearby at "The Elms", a popular island resort. She used the Lee House as a boarding house for overflow guests and fishing parties. Up to twelve people at a time slept there, eating their meals at the Elms. After 1971 the Lee House remained vacant. It was inherited in 1984 by Leona Garvin Harrison's daughter, Shirley Garvin Walton, and in 2000 by her grandchildren, John and Barbara Walton.

"The Lee House represents something unique to Tilghman Island, as do the watermen and their way of life."
