= Girdletree Barnes Bank =

Coordinates: 38°5′37.62″N 75°23′51.25″W

- Interactive map of the Girdletree Barnes Bank area

General information
- Location: Snow Hill Road (Route 12) (Between Snow Hill & Stockton); Girdletree, Maryland, United States
- Construction started: 1901
- Completed: 1902

The Girdletree Barnes Bank is located on Snow Hill Road (Route 12) between Snow Hill and Stockton, Girdletree, Maryland, United States. The bank includes a walk-in vault and antique teller cages. The Girdletree Barnes Bank now serves as the Girdletree Barnes Bank Museum.

== Girdletree Barnes Bank Museum ==
The Girdletree Barnes Bank Museum displays exhibits and memorabilia from the area.
