= Beatty-Cramer House =

Historic house in Maryland, United States

- U.S. National Register of Historic Places
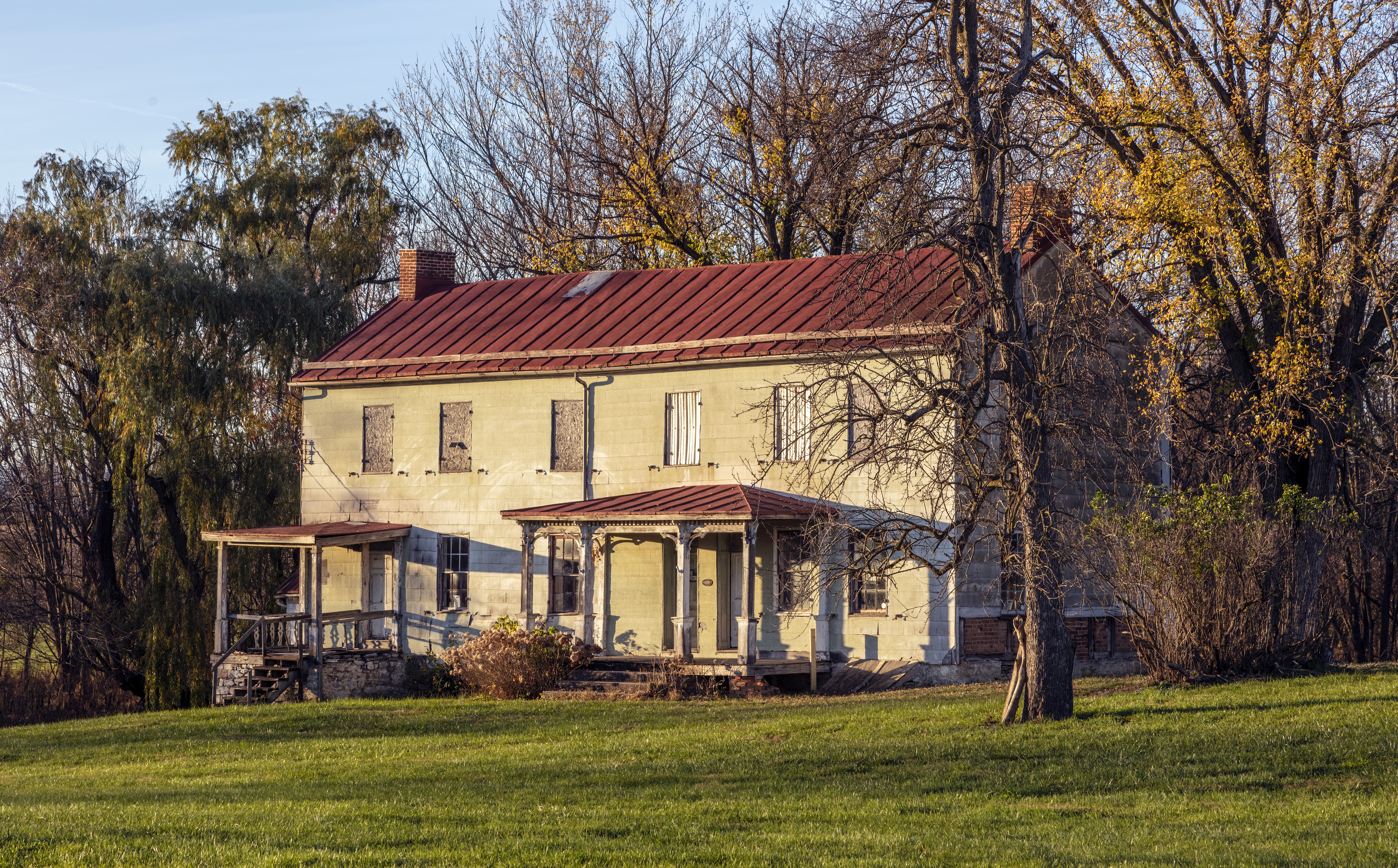
- Beatty-Cramer House in 2022. The visible 19th century exterior encases an 18th century building

- Location within Maryland Location within the United States
- Location: 9010 Liberty Road, Frederick, Maryland
- Coordinates: 39°27′12.05″N 77°21′14.7″W
- Area: 2.8983 acres (1.1729 ha)
- Built: circa 1748 with later additions
- Architectural style: Colonial Dutch
- NRHP reference No.: 100006825
- Added to NRHP: August 20, 2021

The Beatty-Cramer House was built near Israels Creek in Frederick County, Maryland, circa 1748. The oldest house in Frederick County, it is an unusual example of Dutch-influenced construction practices, more typically found in the Hudson Valley. It is the only known example of mixed Dutch, English and American framing and construction methods in Maryland.

== Significance ==
The Beatty-Cramer House is the oldest surviving house in Frederick County, and the only example of a house built using Dutch colonial construction practices in Maryland. The house was listed on the National Register of Historic Places on August 20, 2021.

== History ==
The house was built in the mid-18th century, probably for Thomas Beatty and Maria Jansen Beatty, using Dutch timber framing techniques. The timber used was felled sometime from 1746 to 1748, suggesting that the frame was built in 1748. Partition framing appears to have been felled in 1752-53. The house remained in the Beatty family until 1796, when it was sold to Sebastian Graff, together with 1,004 acres (406 ha) of surrounding land. The property was described on maps as a farm or plantation. Census data suggests that the household had four white males, five white females, and 15 slaves. In 1829 the property was sold to John P. Thomson or Thompson (most likely Thompson). In 1848 the property was sold to John Myers for $8,800. Myers sold the property in 1855 to Jeremiah Henry Cramer for $12,901, comprising the house and 191 acres (77 ha). During the Cramer tenure, the roof was rebuilt, new siding was added, and the previously offset floor levels were equalized.

The Cramer family sold the farm in 1918 to Charles Harshman for $9,114, who in turn sold it the same year to Ida and Vernon Sanner. The Sanner family retained ownership until 1986. By the mid-1980s farming had been discontinued. The Blake Construction Company purchased the property, and considered the house for demolition. In 1987, Joseph Lubozynski investigated the house and established that it was older than it appeared to be. He determined that the visible exterior was a shell over an 18th-century frame, and found evidence of Dutch construction techniques. On learning of the house's historic value, the owner offered to donate the house and a portion of the surrounding land. In 1996 the house and 2.8983 acres (1.1729 ha) were deeded to the Frederick County Landmarks Foundation.

== Description ==
The Beatty-Cramer House's construction used traditional Dutch construction techniques more commonly found in the Hudson Valley of New York were used, employing transverse "H-bent" framing. The frames are infilled with brick nogging or clay daubing over horizontal planking, with plaster finishes. The original interior arrangement included an offset floor level, or "opkamer," typical of Dutch colonial practice. The house is two stories high, 58 feet (18 m) by 22 feet (6.7 m), with seven bays on the lower level, and six above. It was built and expanded in three phases. The original house is the timber H-bent-framed house. A log section was added in 1855, and the north side was encased in a frame overlay at a later date. There were two rooms in the original house on the ground floor, vertically offset from each other by 32 inches (81 cm). The lower room was raised to match the upper room when the addition was built.

The final house arrangement consists of three rooms. The two original rooms are the east and center rooms, with chimneys at either end. The log addition is to the west, with an expanded chimney between it and the now-center room. All three rooms have doors and porches on the south side exterior, and the west room has a back door leading to a porch. There are stairs to the upper level in the west and center rooms. The upper rooms follow the pattern of the rooms below, with the western section subdivided into three rooms. The roof structure was rebuilt in the 19th century.

Outside, the ground falls away to the west toward Israel's Creek, so that the west end of the house is elevated, creating cellar space beneath. The house is clad with asbestos shingles over older wood clapboards, and has a metal roof.

The property also includes a two-story springhouse, built circa 1762, with a Dutch-style fireplace on the lower level and a finished room above. A stone and log smokehouse is also on the property.
