= Ward brothers (carvers) =

American woodcarvers

The Ward Brothers, Lemuel T. Ward (1897–1984) and Steven W. Ward (1895–1976), were two brothers from Crisfield, Maryland, who became famous for their wooden wildfowl carvings, commonly called decoys. Their decoys are highly prized by collectors. Few examples of their work survive on the open market, as private collectors and museums now own most of their original works. In November 2006, a Ward Brothers goldeneye drake decoy sold for US$109,250 at an Easton, Maryland waterfowl festival auction. They adopted the moniker 'Wildfowl Counterfeiters in Wood' as the motto for their carving operation. Another rare Ward Brothers bird, a Broadbill Drake made in 1936, was sold for $51,750 at a January 2013 auction on Park Avenue in New York City.

Originally barbers by trade, they began carving small decoys from cedar blocks in their barber shop during slow times and to help make extra money during the winter months.

== Legacy ==
The Ward Museum of Wildfowl Art in Salisbury, Maryland, which opened in 1992, was named in the Ward brothers' honor. The museum housed the largest collection of wildfowl art in the world, before it was renamed the Museum of Eastern Shore Culture, relocated and repositioned in 2024, as a cultural museum highlighting the Eastern Shore of Maryland and the Delmarva Peninsula.
