= Beall–Dawson House =

Historic house in Maryland

- U.S. National Register of Historic Places
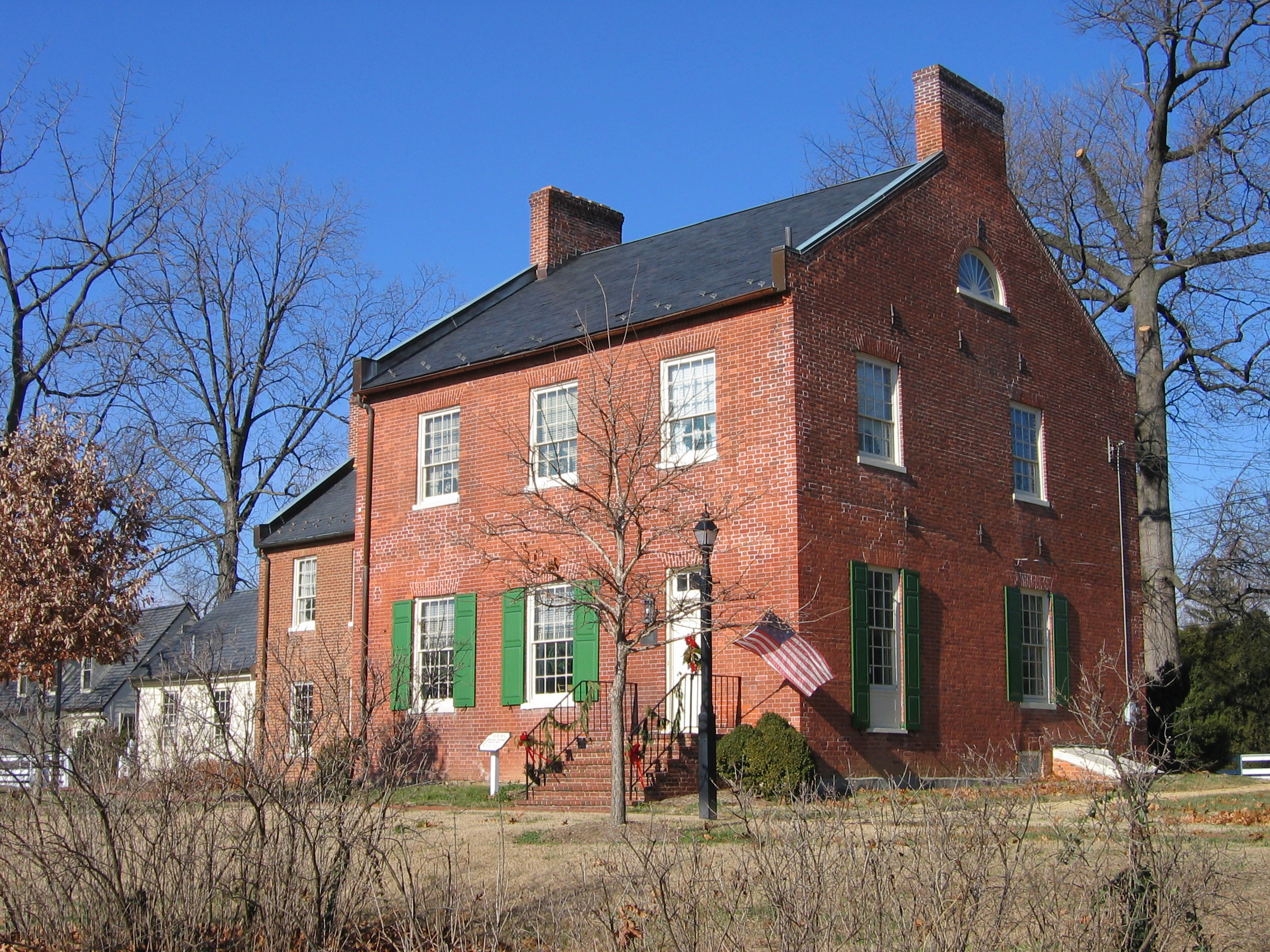
- Beall–Dawson house, January 2005

- Location within Maryland Location within the United States
- Location: 103 W. Montgomery Ave., Rockville, Maryland
- Coordinates: 39°5′4.9″N 77°9′18.8″W
- Area: 1 acre (0.40 ha)
- Built: 1815
- Architectural style: Federal
- NRHP reference No.: 73000933
- Added to NRHP: March 30, 1973

The Beall–Dawson House is a historic home located in Rockville, Montgomery County, Maryland, United States. It is a 2 1/2-story Federal house, three bays wide by two bays deep, constructed of Flemish bond brick on the front facade and common bond elsewhere. Outbuildings on the property include an original brick dairy house and a mid-19th century one-room Gothic Revival frame doctor's office which was moved to the site for use as a museum. The house was constructed in 1815.

It serves as the headquarters of the Montgomery County Historical Society, which maintains the house as an early 19th-century historic house museum. The house also includes indoor slave quarters and two rooms with changing exhibits of local history.

The Beall–Dawson House was listed on the National Register of Historic Places in 1973.

The property also includes the Stonestreet Museum of 19th Century Medicine, a one-room doctor's office with medical and pharmaceutical tools, furniture, and books from the 19th and early 20th centuries.

== History ==
The Beall–Dawson House was built circa 1815 for Upton Beall and his wife and daughters. Beall, from a prominent Georgetown family, was Clerk of the Court for the county, as well as a director of the Washington Turnpike Company, a board member of the Rockville Academy, and a warden and vestryman of the local Episcopal Church. His home reflects his wealth and status. In 1815, Rockville was a small rural community, despite being the county seat and an important cross-roads town. Beall's large brick Federal-style home, built overlooking Commerce Lane (now West Montgomery Avenue), was designed to impress both inside and out. By the 1820s, Upton Beall owned twenty-five enslaved persons, some of whom lived in the house and others who lived in quarters elsewhere on the property.

After Beall died in 1827, ownership of the house moved to his wife, Jane, and his three surviving daughters, Mathilda, Jane Elizabeth, and Margaret. Jane Beall supplemented her income through the sale of her wine and butter. She never remarried, and her three daughters never married. The daughters lived in the house their entire lives. After Mathilda and Jane Elizabeth died, Margaret Beall invited a cousin, Amelia Somervell, to live in the house with her.

Amelia Somervell married John L. Dawson, a local farmer and landowner, and lived at the house until she died in 1898, leaving her husband John and nine children (eight of whom survived to adulthood).

When Margaret Beall died in 1901, she left the house to three of Amelia and John Dawson's daughters—Margaret Somerville Dawson, Mary Kiger Dawson, and Priscilla Beall Dawson—continuing the tradition of three sisters being owners of the house. John L. Dawson served on the Rockville City Council in 1906.

As money grew tight, the Dawsons turned to the house to provide an income, starting a restaurant that ran out of the front yard, teaching dancing lessons to neighborhood children, and taking on boarders. Despite the Dawsons' best efforts, however, the house began to suffer from neglect.

After the last of the Dawson sisters died, Dorothy and Edwin L. Davis purchased the house in 1946. Edwin Davis was the vice president of Davis, Wick, and Rosengarten Construction Company in Washington, DC, and commanding officer of the Washington Volunteer Civil Engineer Corps of the Naval Reserve. Dorothy Davis was an officer of the Montgomery County YWCA, sponsored the 1957 antiques show of the Bethesda Woman's Club, and president of the Inner Wheel Club of Washington. The Davises, who had been looking to take on a fixer-upper, rehabilitated the house and called it "Beallmont." The family returned much of the house to how it would have looked while under the Beall's family care, along with adding an addition to the side of what used to be the servants/slave quarters that housed a modern kitchen and dressing the original kitchen as the family's dining room.

After Edwin Davis's death in 1956, Dorothy Davis' passion for their project waned. In 1965, the City of Rockville purchased the house for $92,500, financed in part by a federal grant; an additional $2 fee on civil marriages performed in the Montgomery County Courthouse; and funds from the Montgomery County Historical Society. For every $2,000 contributed by the Historical Society towards the purchase, they would be allowed a one year lease for use as their offices, exhibitions, and events. By 1981, the Historical Society had named it the Beall-Dawson House and nearly completed its restoration as the county's "teaching house museum."
