= National Museum of Language =

- Location in Maryland
- Established: May 3, 2008
- Location: P.O. Box 453; Greenbelt, Maryland, United States
- Coordinates: 38.976793°N 76.93863°W
- Type: Online museum
- President: Laura K. Murray
- Website: National Museum of Language

The National Museum of Language, located in College Park, Maryland, is a cultural institution incorporated in 1997 to "examine the history, impact, and art of language. Current programs focus on language acquisition and language revitalization as well as promoting linguistic and cultural diversity. It remains one of only a handful of institutions worldwide designed for this purpose. The museum's current president is Dr. Laura Murray.

== History ==
The idea for a national language museum dates to 1971, when linguists at the National Security Agency put on an exhibition called "Language, Its Infinite Variety." However the idea of a language museum did not gain hold until 1985, when the linguists from the NSA exhibition met again to discuss the possibility. The linguists were unable to establish exhibits at that time, but an organizing committee was formed and a board of directors were elected in 1997. Prior to opening to the public, the museum did have a presence with a newsletter, annual dinner and occasional programs, The National Museum of Language is operated by a largely all-volunteer staff. The majority of its funding comes from donations and occasional government grants. There is no membership fee. The museum is one of the founding members of the International Network of Language Museums. NML has partnerships with various language teaching and learning organizations such as the National Foreign Language Center, the Rockville Science Center, NNELL (National Network of Early Language Learning), American Translators Association, Dictionary of Regional American English. See Affiliated Organizations.

NML opened officially on May 3, 2008, with an exhibition entitled "Writing Language: Passing It On," which traced the roots of early alphabet languages, such as Arabic, Latin, Greek and Hebrew, and featured as well character-based Chinese and Japanese. Another noted exhibit which followed was "Emerging American Language in 1812", which explained influences on the development of American English as a separate entity from British English, and included a display about the contributions of Noah Webster, the "First American Lexicographer." Other smaller exhibits focused on Native American, Amharic, and North American French. In 2011, it displayed Bibles and liturgical manuscripts on loan from the Alphabet Museum in Waxhaw, North Carolina.

The museum housed the Allen Walker Read Library (collection of books from a noted American etymologist and lexicographer) The library holdings are available on LibraryThing. The museum also taught classes on occasion. Among its programs were the creation of a speaker's series (renamed the Amelia C. Murdoch Speaker Series after the NML founder), which featured experts in various areas related to language use and history. The Museum also offered grade school programs, and ran a summer language camp. When the museum went virtual, it maintained the speaker series. It still maintains its book collection and displays its flag at museum events.

Among its current online features are a Dictionary of American Regional English (DARE) virtual exhibit, and the Greek language Philogelos comic strip. The NML owns the world's only International Flag of Language, the result of a contest sponsored by the museum in 2008. The three shades of green on the flag represent past, present, and future languages.

=== Funding ===
The NML is mainly operated by volunteer staff. The majority of its funding comes from donations and occasional government grants. There is no membership fee.
