= Discovery Station =

Coordinates: 39°38′35″N 77°43′22″W

Discovery Station at Hagerstown, Inc.
- Established: July 5, 1996
- Location: 101 West Washington Street, Hagerstown, Maryland, 21740
- Type: Hands-On Museum
- Executive director: Mary Beth Jones
- President: Kimberly Halsey
- Website: http://www.discoverystation.org/

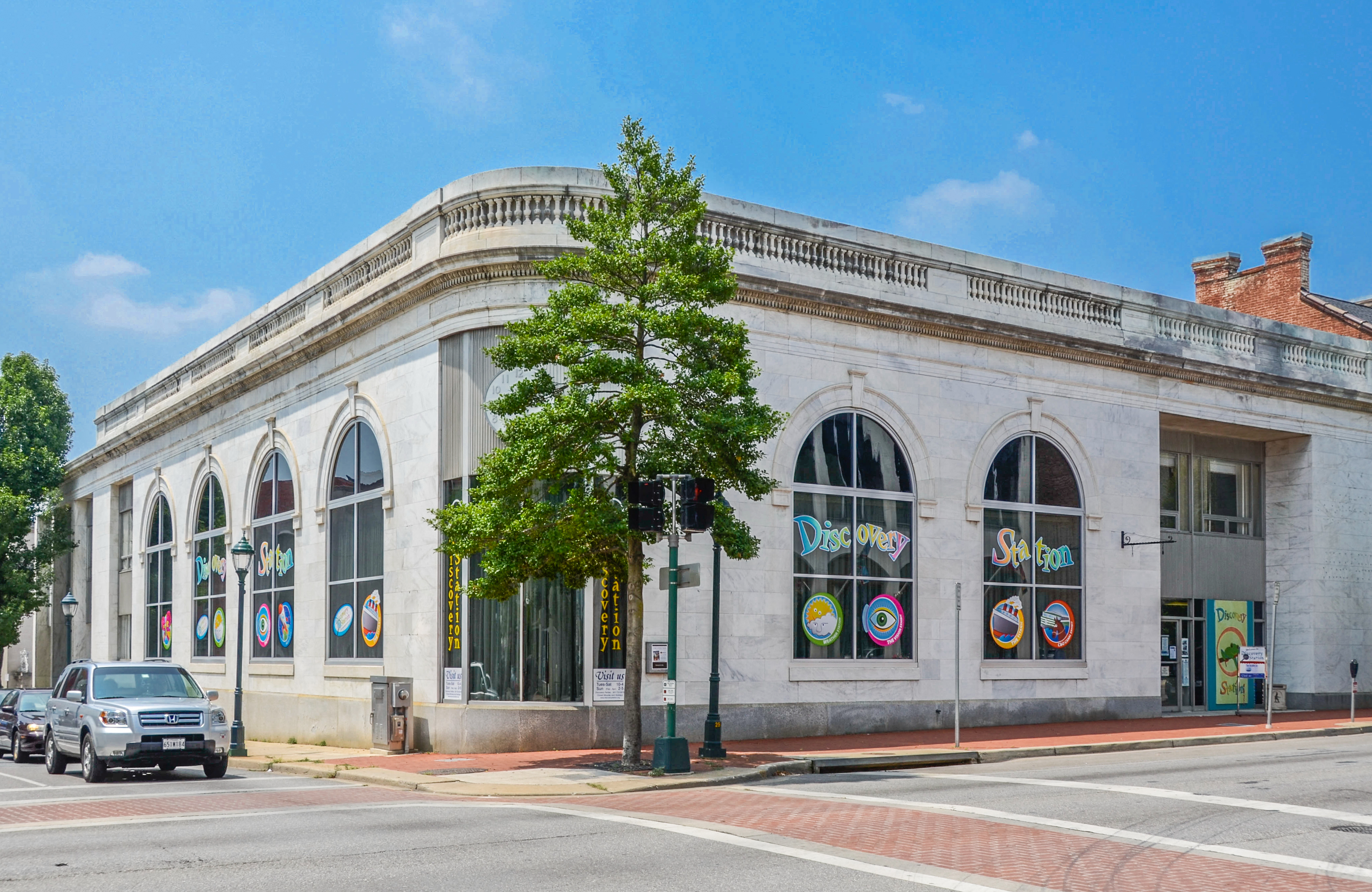
The exterior of Discovery Station at Hagerstown, Inc.

Discovery Station, is a hands-on, family-friendly museum originally located in downtown Hagerstown, Maryland, United States that opened to the public in 2005. In the fall of 2025, the museum moved to Cascade, Maryland. The museum's focus is to create an environment that stimulates curiosity for discovery, exploration, and further investigation through exhibits and programs that focus on Science, Technology, Engineering, Art, and Math (STEAM) principles. The museum is a member of the Association of Science and Technology Centers (ASTC), the American Alliance of Museums (AAM), and the NASA Museum Alliance.

Until August 2025, the museum was located in a historic bank building across from the Washington County Courthouse. The original bank housed the Federal Depository during the Civil War. Visitors can enter the main vault and examine its mammoth leaded glass door and mechanisms. With its white marble exterior and soaring palladium windows, the building is one of the most architecturally significant in downtown Hagerstown.

Discovery Station is visited by thousands of visitors each year and is especially popular with children.

The Museum was visited by 25,380 visitor in 2019

== Exhibits ==
Robotics and Coding

The exhibit contains a section that focuses on the construction and programming of LEGO MINDSTORMS® Education EV3s, a section featuring two LEGO MINDSTORMS® Education EV3 Arena Challenges, where visitors can compete against one another, and a section focused on the real world application of robotics.

Discovery Station also utilizes Botley robots to enable children to develop coding skills.

Dinosaur Exhibit

A full-scale cast model of a Triceratops skull acquired by Discovery Station is on exhibit. Also included in the Dinosaur Exhibit are fossil tracings, literature, and other interactive activities providing hands-on learning experiences.

Space and Beyond

A quarter-scale model of the NEAR Shoemaker spacecraft is on display. This exhibit also touches upon the future of space exploration and the colonization of Mars.

Discovery Station Race Car Derby

This hands-on exhibit features a large-scale race car track for toy cars. The display teaches children and adults the basics of kinetic and potential energy.

Builder's Nook

An interactive exhibit display at Discovery Station where visitors can build bridges, towers, and other structures with special blocks.

Hagerstown Aviation

Exhibit includes equipment and electronics displays, an experimental Papoose airplane built in Washington County, and a hands-on, child-friendly, interactive Cessna 150 with full instrumentation and indicators. Museum visitors can sit in the cockpit and take turns working the controls.

A 1/5 scale replica of the famous PT-19 trainer is on permanent display courtesy of the late Jack Garrott, who piloted a PT-19 during World War II and constructed the flyable model.

The Titanic Exhibit

An exact replica of the RMS Titanic is on display at Discovery Station. It is one of the largest models of the legendary ship ever constructed and took ten years to build. Created by Norman Little from plans and drawings of the original ship, the one-sixtieth scale navigable craft is over fifteen feet in length, weighs 500 pounds, and contains over one thousand portholes. Authentic fittings, stained glass, and passenger replicas add to the realism and historical exactness of the Titanic exhibit.

This award-winning Titanic model has been featured on TV, in newspapers and magazines, and on the cover of Model Tech magazine. It is seaworthy and has been sailed by radio control on waterways in Florida, where it was built.

Sustainability

Opened in late 2016. This hands-on exhibit allow visitors to explore the impact of applying renewable energy practices to their daily lives while enabling them to become the sustainable practitioners of the future.

This exhibit contains hands-on features pertaining to:

- Recycling
- Solar Energy
- Waste Management
- Food Production
- Weather Forecasting

STEAM Machine Art Exhibit

Open in 2017, this hands-on exhibit encompasses numerous STEAM (Science, Technology, Engineering, ART, & Math) principles and focuses on stimulating creativity in the minds of our visitors.

In this exhibit, children can make their own crafts from recycled materials in the Crafter-space. They can draw on our chalkboard wall. There is an Art-space where marker-space meets art and they can paint, too!

Imagination Station

Opened in 2018, this exhibit features a library with a myriad of books for kids of all ages, puzzles, and other hands on activities relating to literacy.

Discovery Town

Opened in 2019, Discovery Town focuses on socio-emotional development, personal health and safety, cognitive development, and motor skills. By focusing on these areas of early childhood development within the framework of this exhibit, Discovery Station assist families with school readiness.

This exhibit features:

- Doctor's Office
- Veterinarian Office
- Dentist Office
- Fire Department
- Playground and Sensory-room

There is also the "Thomas Powell Construction Corner". Named for Thomas Powell, a longtime volunteer who has constructed many of the exhibits at the Discovery Station

Little Sprouts Grocery Store

Opened in late 2019, this exhibit focuses on two objectives:

1. To highlight the importance of good nutrition to a child's physical and cognitive development
2. Develop early math skills and introduce concepts of financial literacy.

A two-generational approach will encourage family engagement and provide additional resources for families and childcare providers.

The exhibit includes lifelike examples of a variety of produce, dairy, wheat and frozen food products, as well as two check-out lanes complete with cash registers, and a farm-to table section highlighting regional products. The exhibit also includes the Discover Savings banking area with materials to encourage children to develop early financial literacy and budgeting skills.

As children enjoy using the exhibit and using their imaginations to develop the level of play, parents and caregivers can take advantage of the bilingual informational panels in each area to identify what skills are being built and how to extend learning at home.

The name for this exhibit was chosen via contest, where children 12 and under submitted a suggested exhibit name with a brief paragraph explaining why they thought that name would be the perfect fit for the museum.

== Programs ==
Regular Programs

Discovery Station holds regular science experiments and STEAM activities each typically on Saturdays. These "STEAM-Saturday Programs" are free with the price of admission into Discovery Station and are usually hands-on.

Throughout the week Discovery Station offers hands-on "Animal Encounters" hosted by Wonderfully-wild

Discovery Station has partnered with The Hub at UMSH on a number of programs, including "The Botley Coding Challenge"

Discovery Station also hosts an ongoing "Story-Time" programs that typically occur on Wednesdays.

COVID-19

Discovery Station created their own, and collaborated with local organizations to offer virtual programming during the COVID-19 pandemic.

Discovery Station partnered with the Judy Center of Washington County, Washington County Free Library, The Hub at USMH, and Washington County Reads to create and distribute 3,000 STEAM kits to community families. These kits were distributed over the course of the summer of 2020 at Meals on Wheels sites around Washington County.

As part of this effort, every Wednesday at 11 a.m. Discovery Station went "Live" on the museum's Facebook page to review the week's kit and for a special story-time with Ms. Abigail of the Washington County Free Library.

== Organization ==
Non-profit Status

Discovery Station at Hagerstown, Inc. is a private, nonprofit organization, incorporated in the State of Maryland on July 5, 1996. Discovery Station is tax exempt under Section 501(c)(3) of the U.S. Internal Revenue Code, as of March 11, 1997. Discovery Station is a charitable organization, registered with the Maryland Office of the Secretary of State, Charitable Organization Division.

== Fundraisers ==
Discovery Station hosts several fundraisers throughout the year to offset the costs associated with operations, program development, and exhibit creation.

- Taste of Vegas, Casino Night - This fundraiser event is an evening of casino games held in Hagerstown, MD each year at the Maryland Theater.
- Surgeons vs. Chefs - This event is a pumpkin carving competition between local surgeons and chefs. It is held at the rustic Springfield Barn in Williamsport, MD.
