= Latvian Museum =

Museum in Maryland, USA

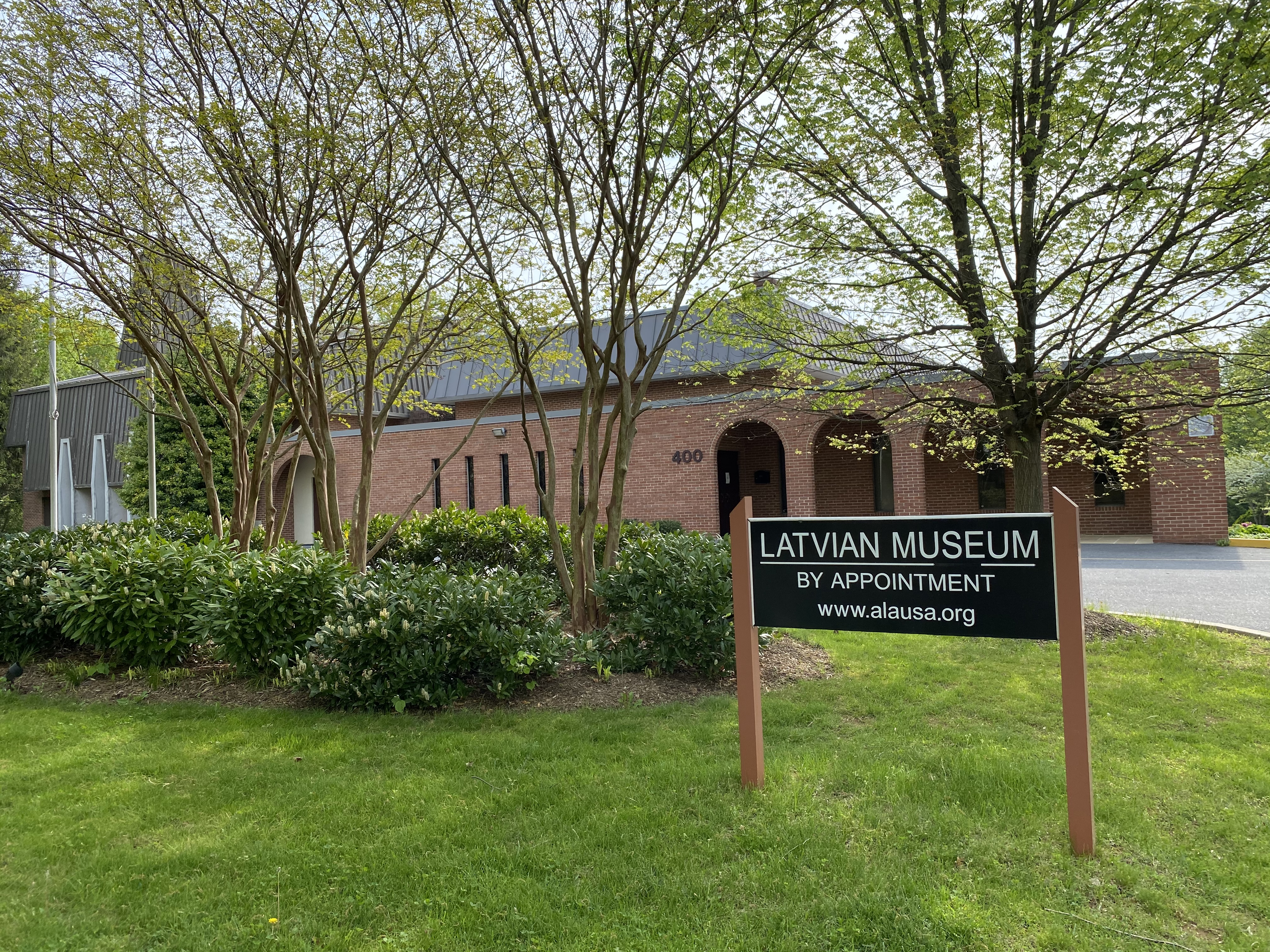

- Location within Maryland Latvian Museum (the United States)
- Established: 1978
- Location: 400 Hurley Avenue Rockville, Maryland
- Coordinates: 39.086370°N 77.179127°W
- Type: Ethnic museum
- Website: www.alausa.org/en/what-we-do/museums/

The Latvian Museum in Rockville, Maryland has as its mission the preservation and communication of Latvian history and culture and the history of Latvians in the United States. The Museum is housed in facilities that include the national headquarters of the American Latvian Association as well as the Latvian Evangelical Lutheran church and Latvian Saturday school which serve the Latvian American community in the greater Washington D.C. area.

== History ==
The Latvian Museum was founded in 1978 under the auspices of the Latvian Institute of the American Latvian Association, with its initial exhibitions funded by a grant from the National Endowment for the Humanities.

== Collection ==
The collection is especially noted for its traditional hand woven textiles.
