= Museum of Eastern Shore Culture =

Museum in Maryland, United States

Ward Museum of Wildfowl Art
- Location within Maryland Location within the United States
- Established: 1975 (building in 1992)
- Dissolved: Re-positioned in 2023
- Location: Formerly 909 South Schumaker Drive; Salisbury, Maryland
- Coordinates: 38°21′52.87549″N 75°36′7.62727″W
- Type: Art

The Museum of Eastern Shore Culture originated in 2024 when the mission of the former Ward Museum of Wildfowl Art was broadened to include the gammut of cultural aspects — folklife, traditional arts and regional heritage — of the Eastern Shore of Maryland and the Delmarva Peninsula.

Located in Salisbury, Maryland at 218 W. Main St., adjacent to Salisbury University, the museum continues to feature the waterfowl carvings of the original museum, along with the Salisbury University permanent collection, noted for its world-class wildfowl carvings from over 100 global artists, spanning more than fifty years.

== History ==
Founded in 1975 and formalized in 1990, the Ward Museum of Wildfowl Art highlighted wildfowl carvings, from art sculptures to working hunters' decoys, and was named after bird carvers Lem and Steve Ward of Crisfield, Maryland, whose work elevated the art of decoy carving. The museum existed as a partnership of Salisbury University and the Ward Foundation, the latter having transferred its assets to the university in 2000. It was located on Schumaker pond at a dedicated facility at Salisbury University — and was a member of the American Alliance of Museums.

In 1990, the Ward Foundation had conducted a design competition to select the architect for a 32,000 SF facility to be located on Schumaker Pond in Salisbury, Maryland. Working with noted exhibits' consultant Ben Kozak, the Salisbury firm of Davis, Bowen & Friedel, Inc., and lead design architect Michael Wigley, AIA, were selected for the commission. In 1992, Brohawn Construction of Cambridge, Maryland, completed the project.

The museum's reconceptualization and move to the new Powell street Building was expedited after a failure of the original building's HVAC system required remediation of surface mold on portions of the museum's collection, and a series of financial hardships forced its closure.

The Ward Museum of Wildfowl Art closed in 2023 at its Schumaker Pond location, and was relocated. The Ward Foundation continues to operate the Ward World Championship.

The former facility included a Welcome Theatre, Decoy In Time exhibit, Habitat Theatre, Art Lamay Gallery, Decoy Study Gallery, The Ward Brothers’ Workshop and the Championship Gallery.
