= List of Maryland Scenic Byways =

Maryland Scenic Byways
- Maryland Scenic Byways signage

Highway names
- Interstates: Interstate X (I-X)
- US Highways: U.S. Route X (US X)
- State: Maryland Route X (MD X)

System links
- Maryland highway system; Interstate; US; State; Scenic Byways

The Maryland Scenic Byways system consists of nineteen byways that pass through scenic and historic areas across the U.S. state of Maryland, with four of them designated as National Scenic Byways and two of them designated as All-American Roads. The byways pass through a variety of surroundings, such as the mountains of Western Maryland, the rolling countryside in the northern part of the state, urban sites in the Baltimore and Washington, D.C., areas, small towns and wildlife areas along the Chesapeake Bay, and beaches along the Atlantic Ocean. The byways also serve historical sites ranging from colonial settlement, the War of 1812, and the American Civil War, along with byways that follow the historic routes of the National Road, the Chesapeake and Ohio Canal, and the Underground Railroad.

== Historic National Road ==
#1: Historic National Road
- Location: Keysers Ridge – Baltimore
- Length: 170 mi (270 km)

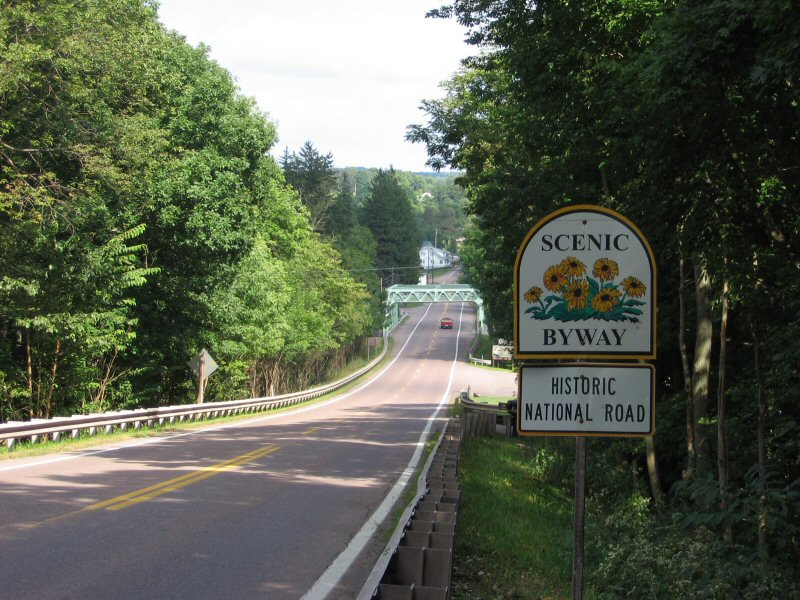
National Road Scenic Byway on US 40 Alt. in Garrett County

The Historic National Road Scenic Byway travels from Keysers Ridge to Baltimore along the historic route of the National Road, a road that connected Baltimore to Vandalia, Illinois. The road is designated an All-American Road.

The byway enters Maryland in Garrett County along US 40, following that route to Keysers Ridge. Here, the National Road follows US 40 Alternate, heading through the Savage River State Forest and reaching Grantsville, where the Casselman Bridge is located. The road passes through Frostburg, where the Western Maryland Scenic Railroad is located, and La Vale, where the La Vale Tollgate House is located. The byway comes to Cumberland, which has many historic transportation sites. From Cumberland, the Historic National Road Scenic Byway follows Henderson Avenue and Baltimore Street to I-68, continuing east on I-68 before splitting onto MD 144 and passing through Rocky Gap State Park and Green Ridge State Forest. At this point, the byway follows US 40 Scenic and crosses Sideling Hill. The byway follows MD 144 again and continues to Hancock, where the byway has access to the Chesapeake and Ohio Canal and the Western Maryland Rail Trail.

Past Hancock, the Historic National Road Scenic Byway follows I-70 before splitting onto US 40, with a detour along MD 56 and MD 68 providing access to Fort Frederick State Park. The byway continues to Hagerstown, which has South Prospect Street Historic District among other historic sites. In Hagerstown, the byway runs along Franklin Street, Locust Street, Baltimore Street, and Frederick Street. After Hagerstown, the Historic National Road Scenic Byway follows US 40 Alternate through Funkstown to Boonsboro, where Washington Monument State Park is located. At this point, the byway crosses the Appalachian National Scenic Trail and heads across South Mountain State Park. The road continues through Middletown and reaches Frederick, where the byway heads onto US 40. In Frederick, the byway has access to the National Museum of Civil War Medicine and Rose Hill Manor. Past Frederick, the National Scenic Road Scenic Byway continues along MD 144 and passes through New Market before reaching Mount Airy, where it briefly follows MD 27 before following MD 144 again. The byway reaches Ellicott City, which is home to the Ellicott City Station and the Thomas Isaac Log Cabin, before crossing Patapsco Valley State Park. The road continues through Catonsville before heading into Baltimore. Here, the Historical National Road Scenic Byway heads along Lombard Street, passing through the Union Square neighborhood before passing by the B&O Railroad Museum and ending at the Inner Harbor.

== Mountain Maryland ==
#2: Mountain Maryland
- Location: Keysers Ridge – Cumberland
- Length: 193 mi (311 km)

The Mountain Maryland Scenic Byway loops across the mountains of Western Maryland.

The byway begins in Keysers Ridge and follows I-68 west to Friendsville, where Youghiogheny River Lake is located. At this point, the byway continues south along MD 42 toward US 219. The Mountain Maryland Scenic Byway followed US 219 to McHenry, which is home to Wisp Ski Resort and Deep Creek Lake State Park. The byway heads west on Mayhew Inn Road and Swallow Falls Road, coming to Swallow Falls State Park. A spur on Cranesville Road provides access to Cranesville Swamp Preserve. The Mountain Maryland Scenic Byway continues south along Herrington Manor Road and comes to Herrington Manor State Park before heading to the historic town of Oakland. From Oakland, the byway follows MD 135 through Mountain Lake Park and Deer Park, coming to the Potomac-Garrett State Forest. A detour in the state forest follows MD 560. There are also diversions along MD 495 to rural areas of the Allegany Highlands, MD 38 to Kitzmiller, and Savage River Road to the Savage River State Forest. The mainline of the byway continues to descend Backbone Mountain on MD 135 before heading along MD 36. Along MD 36, the byway passes through Lonaconing and Midland, which were company coal mining towns. The Mountain Maryland Scenic Byway continues through Frostburg before passing through Mount Savage and the Cumberland Narrows and ending in Cumberland.

== Chesapeake and Ohio Canal ==
#3: Chesapeake and Ohio Canal
- Location: Cumberland–Washington, D.C.
- Length: 236 mi (380 km)

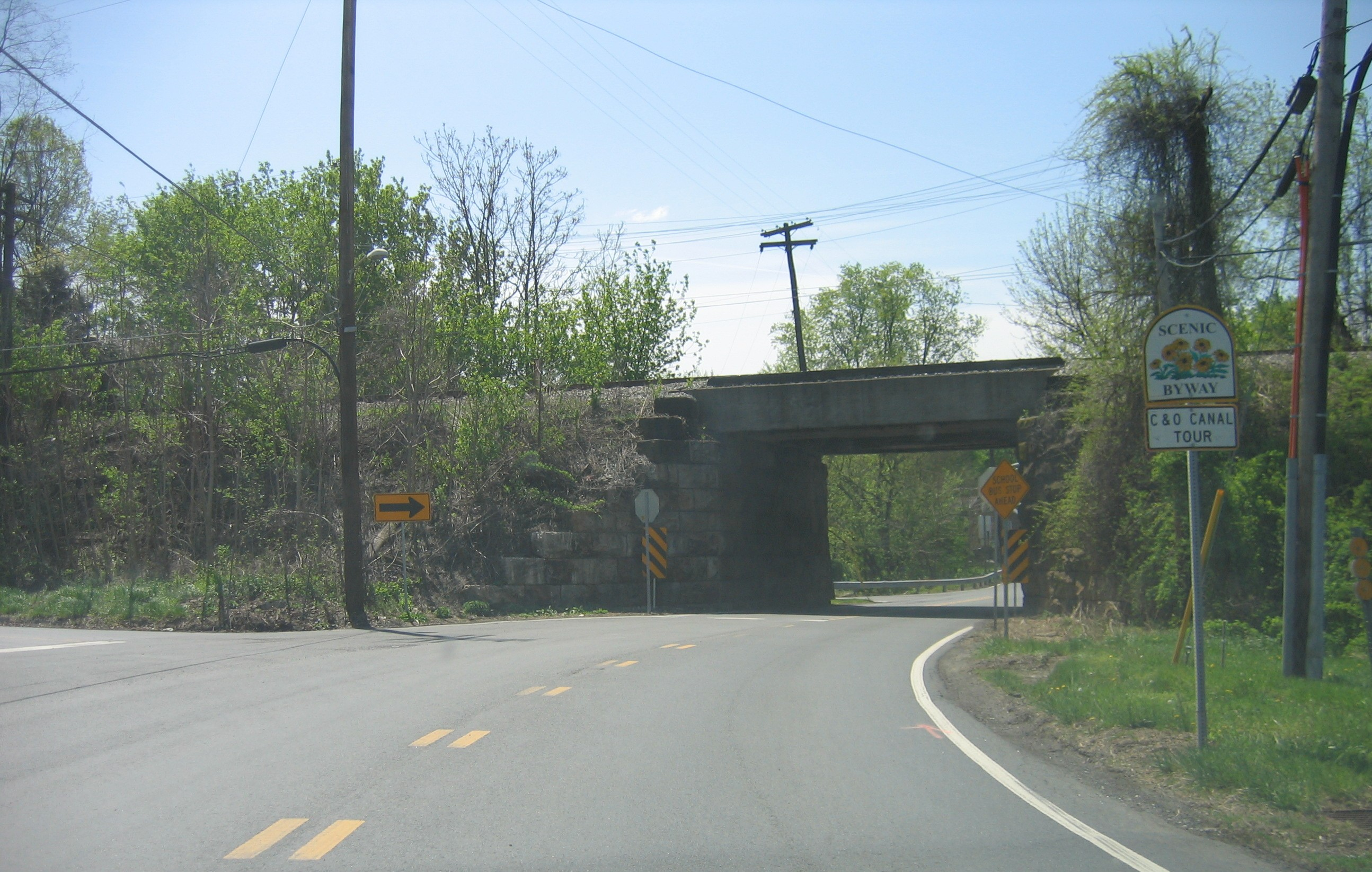
The Chesapeake and Ohio Canal Scenic Byway along MD 28 in Dickerson

The Chesapeake and Ohio Canal Scenic Byway runs between Cumberland and Washington, D.C., following the towpath of the Chesapeake and Ohio Canal, a canal that operated along the Potomac River between 1828 and 1924.

The byway begins in Cumberland, a transportation center that is home to the Chesapeake and Ohio Canal National Historical Park Visitor Center and Canal Place, and follows MD 51 out of the city. The road passes through Spring Gap Recreation Area and Green Ridge State Forest. The byway comes to the Paw Paw Tunnel and crosses the North Branch Potomac River into Paw Paw, West Virginia, following WV 9 and US 522 through a portion of West Virginia. The Chesapeake and Ohio Canal Scenic Byway crosses the North Branch Potomac River back into Maryland at Hancock, which is home to the Chesapeake and Ohio Canal Museum and Visitors Center. The byway runs along MD 144 and I-70 before splitting onto MD 56 and coming to Fort Frederick State Park. From here, the byway continues along the canal towpath, running along MD 56, MD 68, and MD 63 before following MD 65. The road comes to Sharpsburg, which is near the Antietam National Battlefield. From Sharpsburg, the byway continues south along MD 34 and Harpers Ferry Road, with a detour along US 340 to Harpers Ferry, West Virginia.

The Chesapeake and Ohio Canal Scenic Byway heads east on MD 478 into Brunswick, which is the location of the Brunswick Heritage Museum and a Visitor Center. The byway continues along MD 464 to Point of Rocks, which is where the Baltimore and Ohio Railroad met the Chesapeake and Ohio Canal. From here, the byway follows MD 28 across the Monocacy Natural Resource Management Area, with a spur leading to Sugarloaf Mountain. The Chesapeake and Ohio Canal Scenic Byway heads south on MD 109 into Poolesville, where the John Poole House and the Seneca Schoolhouse is located. A side route on the byway heads west to the White's Ferry across the Potomac River. Another branch off the byway runs through areas protected by the Montgomery County, Maryland Agricultural Reserve, with the road continuing along MD 118 to Germantown, a small town with antique shops. The mainline of the byway continues through Seneca Creek State Park and picks up MD 190 (River Road), continuing along the canal towpath. The byway turns south onto Falls Road and comes to the Great Falls of the Potomac River. From here, the Chesapeake and Ohio Canal Scenic Byway heads east along MacArthur Boulevard before continuing onto the Clara Barton Parkway. The road has access to the Clara Barton National Historic Site before reaching Washington, D.C., and continuing to Georgetown.

== Antietam Campaign ==
#4: Antietam Campaign
- Location: White's Ferry – Sharpsburg
- Length: 126 mi (203 km)

The Antietam Campaign Scenic Byway runs from White's Ferry and Sharpsburg. The byway offers access to sites related to the Battle of Antietam of the American Civil War, which took place in September 1862 and was the bloodiest day in the war. The route roughly follows the path of the Maryland Campaign took by Confederate General Robert E. Lee.

The Antietam Campaign Scenic Byway begins in White's Ferry, the site of a ferry crossing where Lee crossed into Maryland from Virginia. The byway follows Whites Ferry Road to Poolesville, which is home to the John Poole House. From here, the byway continues north on MD 109, passing through Beallsville and Barnesville before reaching Comus, where Lee's army won a rearguard action. From Comus, the Antietam Campaign Scenic Byway continues west on Comus Road and Mt. Ephraim Road, crossing Sugarloaf Mountain, which served as a lookout for troops. The byway reaches Dickerson and follows MD 28 across the Monocacy Natural Resource Management Area. The route continues north onto MD 85 and passes through Buckeystown. At this point, the byway follows Michaels Mill Road and Baker Valley Road to the Monocacy National Battlefield, which was site of the Battle of Monocacy in 1864, a battle that was known as "The Battle That Saved Washington". The byway continues north on MD 355 to Frederick, which has the National Museum of Civil War Medicine and the Barbara Fritchie House. From Frederick, the Antietam Campaign Scenic Byway follows US 40 and US 40 Alternate before turning south onto MD 17. The road passes near South Mountain State Park in an area where several small battles were fought prior to the Battle of Antietam. The byway crosses South Mountain and continues north on MD 67 to Boonsboro, which has a museum with Civil War artifacts. At this point, the Antietam Campaign Scenic Byway continues west on MD 34 to Sharpsburg. Along this stretch of road, it passes through the Antietam National Battlefield, which preserves the site of the Battle of Antietam on September 17, 1862.

== Journey Through Hallowed Ground ==
#5: Journey Through Hallowed Ground
- Location: Point of Rocks – Emmitsburg
- Length: 57 mi (92 km)

The Journey Through Hallowed Ground Byway is a National Scenic Byway that runs from Monticello, Virginia, to Gettysburg, Pennsylvania, with the Maryland portion running from Point of Rocks to Emmitsburg, passing through the Catoctin Mountain area. The byway was formerly known as the Catoctin Mountain Scenic Byway.

The byway enters Maryland from Virginia in Point of Rocks, which is the historic meeting point of the Baltimore and Ohio Railroad and the Chesapeake and Ohio Canal. From here, the byway follows US 15 and US 340 north to Frederick, which has many historic sites. The Journey Through Hallowed Ground Byway continues along US 15 before branching onto MD 806 and passing by the Catoctin Wildlife Preserve and Zoo. The road continues into Thurmont, where the Roddy Road Covered Bridge is located. From here, the byway continues along US 15 to Emmitsburg, which is home to the Mason and Dixon Discovery Center and St. Joseph's College and Mother Seton Shrine The byway continues north from Emmittsburg to the Pennsylvania border.

From Thurmont, a loop of the Journey Through Hallowed Ground Byway heads west on MD 77 across Catoctin Mountain and reaches Cunningham Falls State Park, which is home to Catoctin Furnace. At this point, Catoctin Mountain Park, which contains the Camp David Presidential retreat, is to the north of the road. The byway continues to Smithsburg. From Smithsburg, the loop of the Journey Through Hallowed Ground Byway heads south to Wolfsville and follows MD 17 through a valley. The byway heads onto Highland School Road, which reaches the summit of Catoctin Mountain, before heading onto Gambrill Park Road into Gambrill State Park. The loop continues east on US 40 toward Frederick.

== Old Main Streets ==
#6: Old Main Streets
- Location: Emmitsburg – Mount Airy
- Length: 111 mi (179 km)

The Old Main Streets Scenic Byway loops through small rural towns across the northern part of Maryland between Emmitsburg and Mount Airy.

The upper loop of the byway begins in Emmitsburg, which is home to St. Joseph's College and Mother Seton Shrine. From here, the byway continues south along US 15 to Thurmont, which is a small town at the foot of Catoctin Mountain that is home to several covered bridges. The Old Main Streets Scenic Byway continues east on MD 77, passing through the community of Detour, which developed along the Western Maryland Railway. The byway continues east on Middleburg Road and reaches Uniontown, a small village with many country homes and the Uniontown Academy. Uniontown Road continues east to Westminster, which is home to McDaniel College and the Carroll County Farm Museum. From Westminster, the byway heads northwest on MD 140 and MD 832 to Taneytown, which was founded as an agricultural trading center. The upper loop of the Old Main Streets Scenic Byway continues along MD 140 back to Emmitsburg.

From Uniontown, the lower loop of the Old Main Streets Scenic Byway heads south along MD 84 and west along MD 75 to Linwood, which has many Victorian buildings. The next town west is Union Bridge, which is home to the Union Bridge Station. The byway continues southwest through Johnsville to Libertytown, where it turns northeast onto MD 31. The lower loop of the byway passes through the historic town of New Windsor before continuing north of MD 84 and returning to Uniontown.

At Libertytown, a branch of the Old Main Streets Scenic Byway heads east along MD 26 before following Woodville Road, Shirley Bohn Road, and Buffalo Road south through countryside that has several vineyards. The byway heads into Mount Airy and runs through town on MD 808 (Main Street), with nearby recreation. The byway continues along MD 27 to the National Road.

== Mason and Dixon ==
#7: Mason and Dixon
- Location: Emmitsburg–Appleton
- Length: 143 mi (230 km)

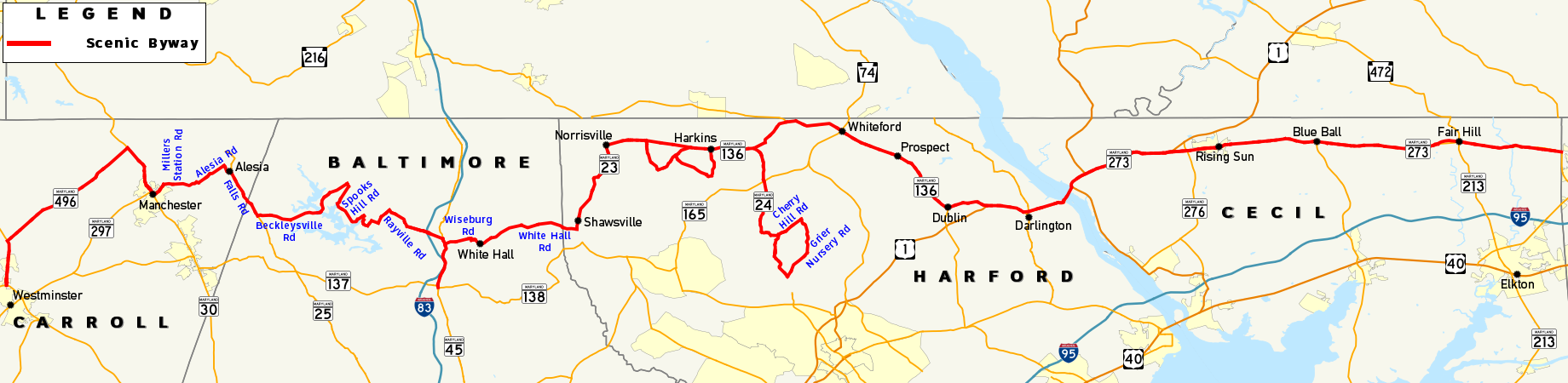
Map of the Mason and Dixon Scenic Byway

The Mason and Dixon Scenic Byway runs south of the Mason–Dixon line, a line surveyed by Charles Mason and Jeremiah Dixon in the 1760s to separate Maryland from Pennsylvania. The byway runs through rural areas between Emmitsburg and Appleton.

The byway begins in Emmitsburg, which is home to the Mason and Dixon Discovery Center. From here, it follows MD 140, MD 832, and MD 140 again to Westminster, which is home to the Carroll County Farm Museum. From Westminster, the byway heads north on MD 97 to Union Mills, where the Union Mills Homestead Historic District is located. The Mason and Dixon Scenic Byway runs east along MD 496 before turning south onto MD 30 and passing through Melrose before reaching Manchester, a historic town. The byway heads east on York Street, Millers Station Road, and Alesia Road before continuing south on MD 25. The Mason and Dixon Scenic byway splits east onto Beckleysville Road and heads across the Prettyboy Reservoir. The byway turns east onto Kidds Schoolhouse Road before continuing southeast along Spooks Hill Road, passing near more of the reservoir. The route heads east along Rayville Road and Middletown Road, briefly turning south on York Road before resuming east along Wiseburg Road. The road comes to White Hall, where it crosses the Northern Central Rail Trail. From here, the Mason and Dixon Scenic Byway continues along White Hall Road, turning north onto MD 23 and passing through Drybranch and Norrisville. Here, the byway heads east on MD 136 and runs a short distance south of the Mason–Dixon line separating Maryland from Pennsylvania, reaching Harkins.

In Harkins, a loop of the Mason and Dixon Scenic Byway heads south on MD 24, passing Eden Mill Nature Center and Rocks State Park. The loop continues through agricultural areas and turns north onto Grier Nursery Road and west onto Cherry Hill Road before heading back onto MD 24 and reconnecting to the mainline of the byway.

From Harkins, the mainline of the Mason and Dixon Scenic Byway continues east along MD 136, passing through Whiteford, where there are many agricultural sites nearby. The byway continues east onto US 1 and crosses the Susquehanna River on the Conowingo Dam. The Mason and Dixon Scenic Byway heads east onto MD 273 and passes through Rising Sun, where the Plumpton Park Zoo is located to the east of town. The road comes to the Fair Hill Natural Resource Management Area, which occupies former land owned by the Du Pont family and has equestrian facilities, before the byway ends at the Delaware border in Appleton.

== Falls Road ==
#8: Falls Road
- Location: Baltimore – Alesia
- Length: 39 mi (63 km)

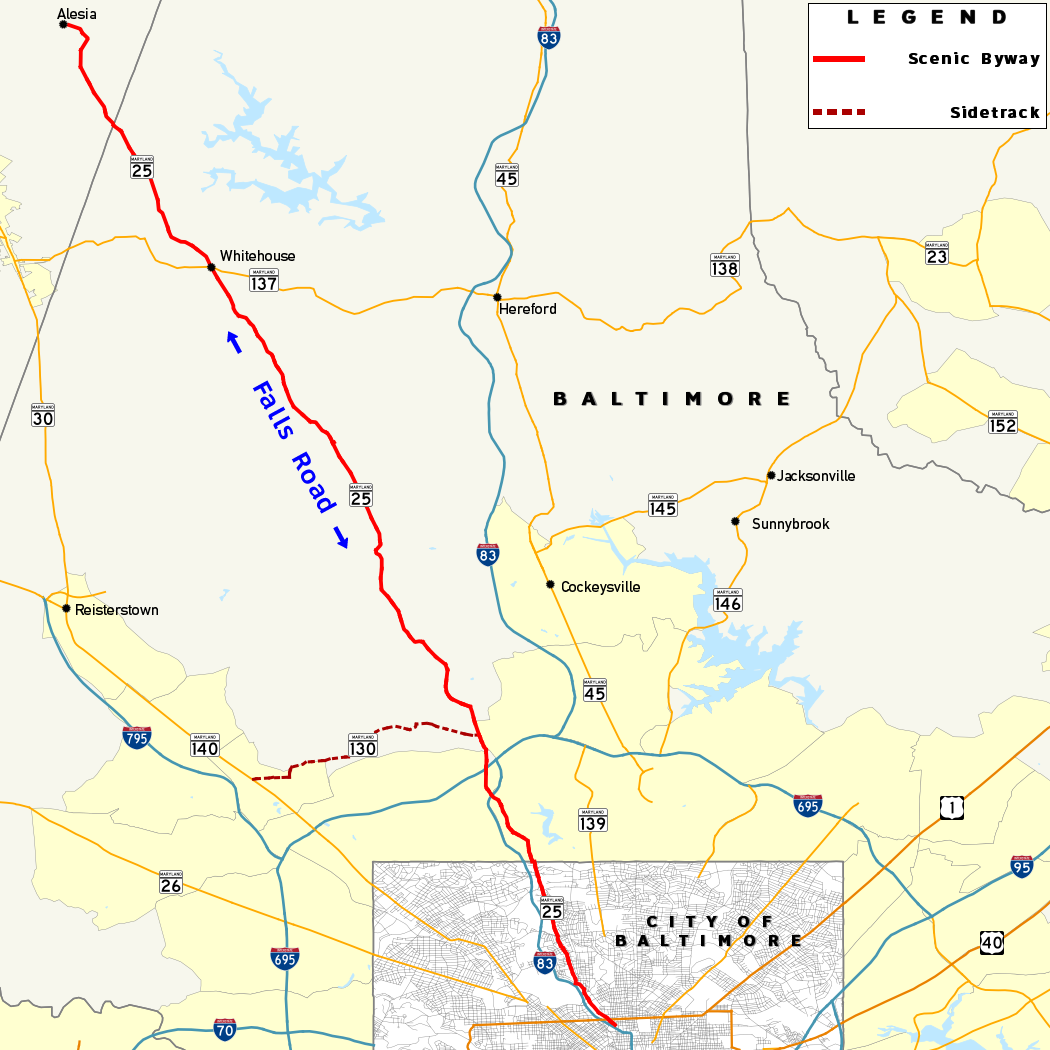
Map of the Falls Road Scenic Byway

The Falls Road Scenic Byway follows Falls Road (MD 25) between Baltimore and Alesia, passing through a mix of urban and rural surroundings in the Jones Falls Valley.

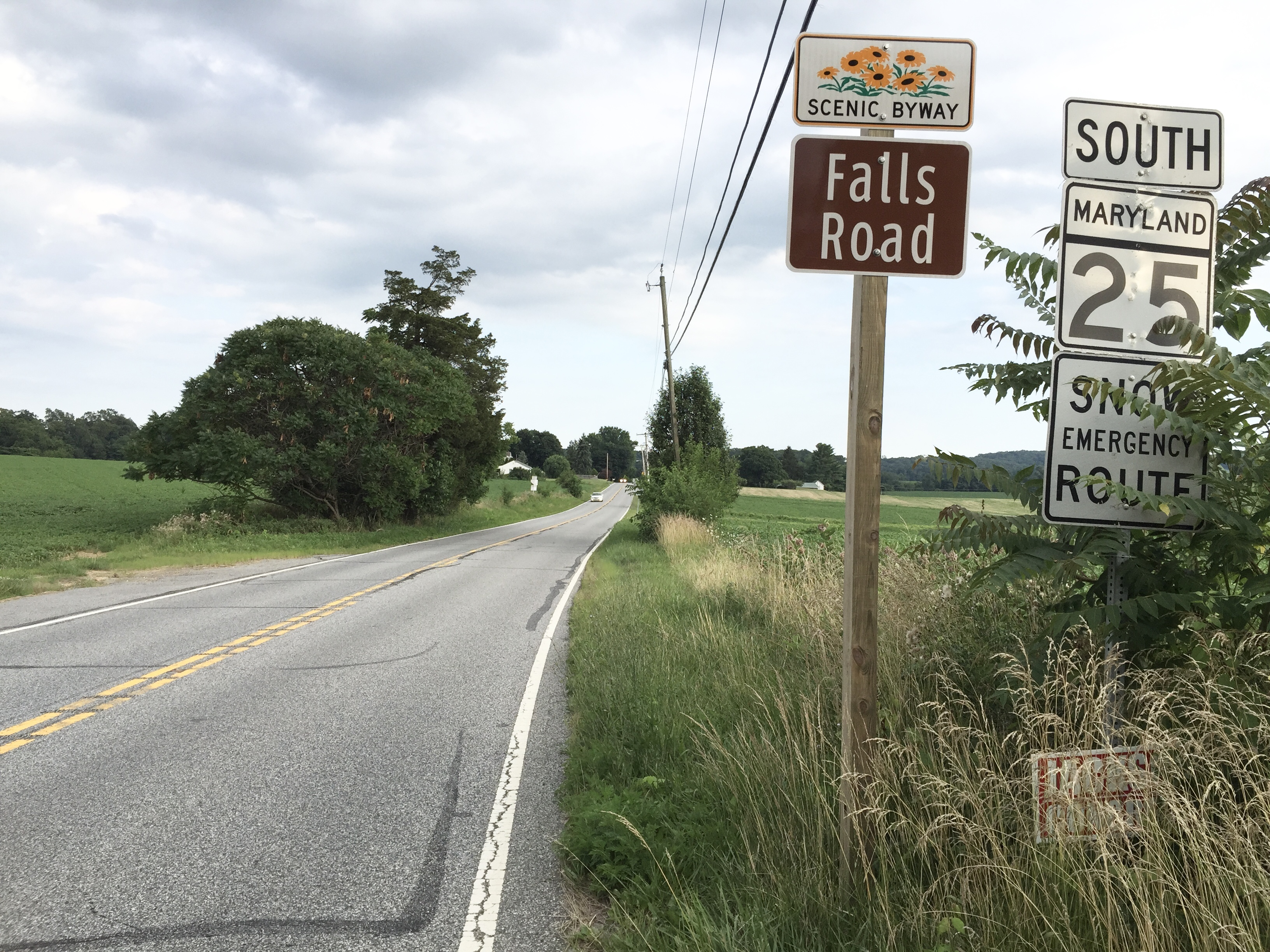
View south along Falls Road in Whitehouse

The byway begins in Baltimore, heading north past the Baltimore Streetcar Museum. The road continues near the Baltimore neighborhoods of Woodberry, Brick Hill, and Hampden, passing near Johns Hopkins University. The route passes through the Roland Park neighborhood before coming to Mount Washington, which is considered by some to be Baltimore's first suburb. The Falls Road Scenic Byway heads into Baltimore County and passes the Bare Hills House before coming to Ruxton Road, which provides access to Ruxton. Falls Road crosses I-695 and passes by The Cloisters, a mansion that was constructed in 1932. A spur to the west along MD 130 provides access to Maryvale Preparatory School and St. Paul's School. Farther north, the byway heads into more rural areas and comes to Oregon Ridge Park before reaching Butler. The Falls Road Scenic Byway passes near Gunpowder Falls State Park and Prettyboy Reservoir before coming to Alesia.

== Horses and Hounds ==
#9: Horses and Hounds
- Location: Cockeysville–Towson
- Length: 100 mi (160 km)

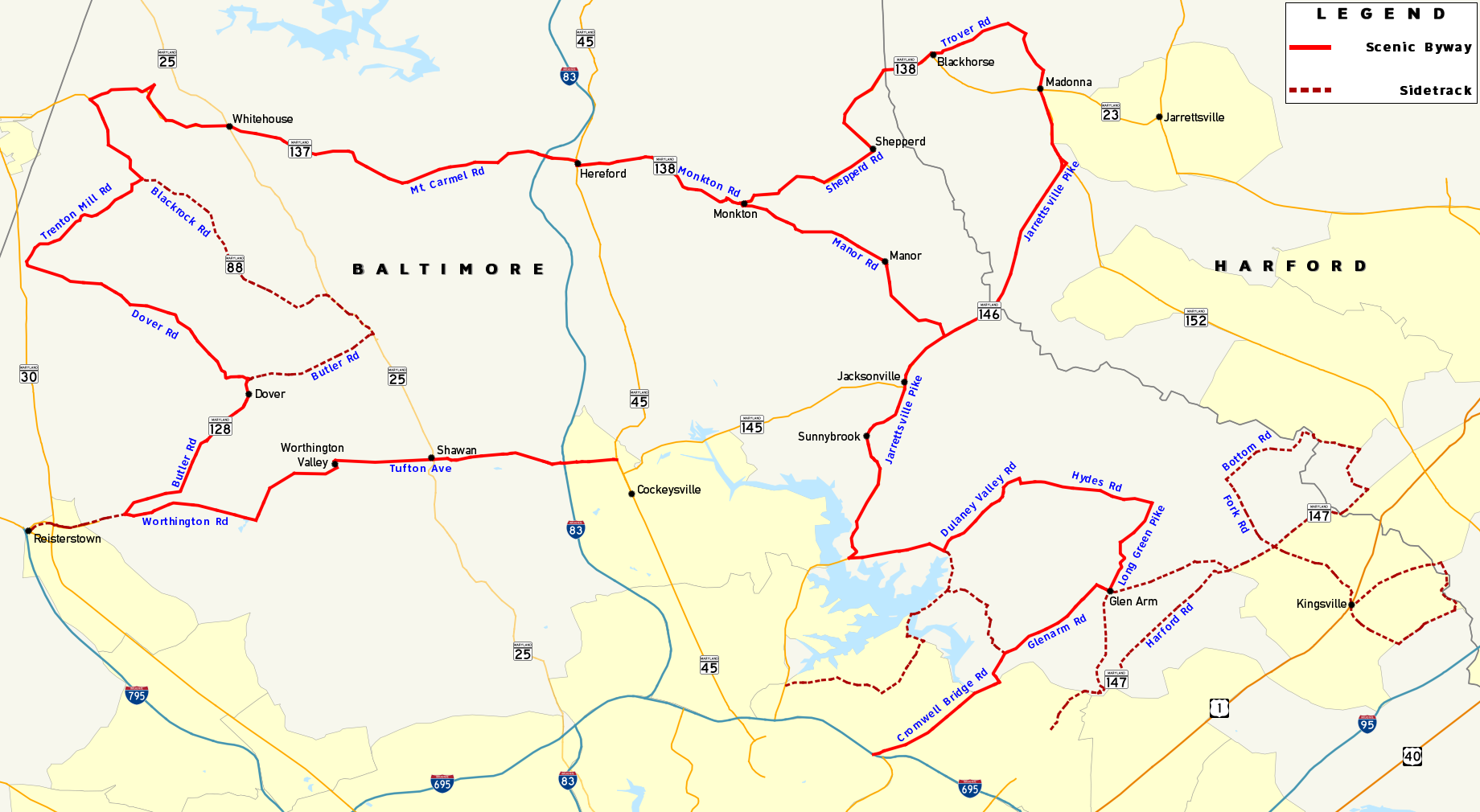
Map of the Horses and Hounds Scenic Byway

The Horses and Hounds Scenic Byway extends 100 miles (160 km) in a loop through northern and eastern Baltimore County and western Harford County. The byway begins at I-83 Exit 20 in Cockeysville and heads west along Shawan Road, passing between Oregon Ridge Park and the equestrian facility Shawan Downs, home of the Legacy Chase, a steeplechase event. Another steeplechase, the Maryland Hunt Cup, is held in Worthington Valley, which the byway passes through along Tufton Avenue. The byway continues west along Worthington Road toward Glyndon. There, a spur of the byway heads toward Reisterstown while the mainline turns north onto MD 128.

Along MD 128, the Horses and Hounds Scenic Byway passes St. John's Episcopal Church, home of an annual "Blessing of the Hounds," on its way to Butler, home of the Grand National Steeplechase. The main path of the byway leaves MD 128 at Dover Road to head toward Upperco, then veers northwest on Trenton Hill Road to rejoin a secondary path that follows MD 128 to MD 25, where the byway runs concurrently with the Falls Road Scenic Byway, to MD 88. The byway leaves MD 88 at Grace Road, then heads east on Mt. Carmel Road, which becomes MD 137. MD 137 heads east through White House to Hereford, where the byway briefly heads south on MD 45 before continuing east on MD 138 to Monkton, where the byway crosses paths with the Northern Central Railroad Trail.

At Monkton, the Horses and Hounds Scenic Byway splits into a shorter branch that follows Manor Road to MD 146 and a longer branch that follows MD 138 past My Lady's Manor, site of another steeplechase course, into Harford County. The byway follows Troyer Road, Harford Creamery Road, and Madonna Road to MD 146 near Jarrettsville before returning to Baltimore County and passing the Ladew Topiary Gardens. The two byway paths merge north of Jacksonville and follow MD 146 south to the Loch Raven Reservoir, where the byway follows Dulaney Valley Road and Hydes Road east to Hydes, home of the Boordy Vineyards. The byway follows Long Green Pike past St. John the Evangelist Catholic Church to Glen Arm.

From Glen Arm the Horses and Hounds Scenic Byway has a long sidetrack that heads east toward Jerusalem, which contains one of several units of Gunpowder Falls State Park. The sidetrack follows Glen Arm Road to MD 147, follows Reckord Road, Guyton Road, and Bottom Road in a brief jaunt through Harford County near Fallston, heads southeast along Fork Road, Sunshine Avenue, and Bradshaw Road through Kingsville, east along Franklinville Road to Jerusalem, north along Jericho Road to the Jerusalem Mill Village, and west along Jerusalem Road back to Kingsville. The alternate byway route follows MD 147 to Factory Road, which it follows back to Glen Arm. The main byway path heads southwest along Glen Arm Road and Cromwell Bridge Road to its end at I-695 near Towson. The final side path leaves Glen Arm Road for a path around Loch Raven Reservoir along Manor Road, Morgan Mill Road, Loch Raven Drive, and Providence Road to the side path's end at the Hampton National Historic Site in Towson.

== Lower Susquehanna ==
#10: Lower Susquehanna
- Location: Havre de Grace – Perryville
- Length: 33 mi (53 km)

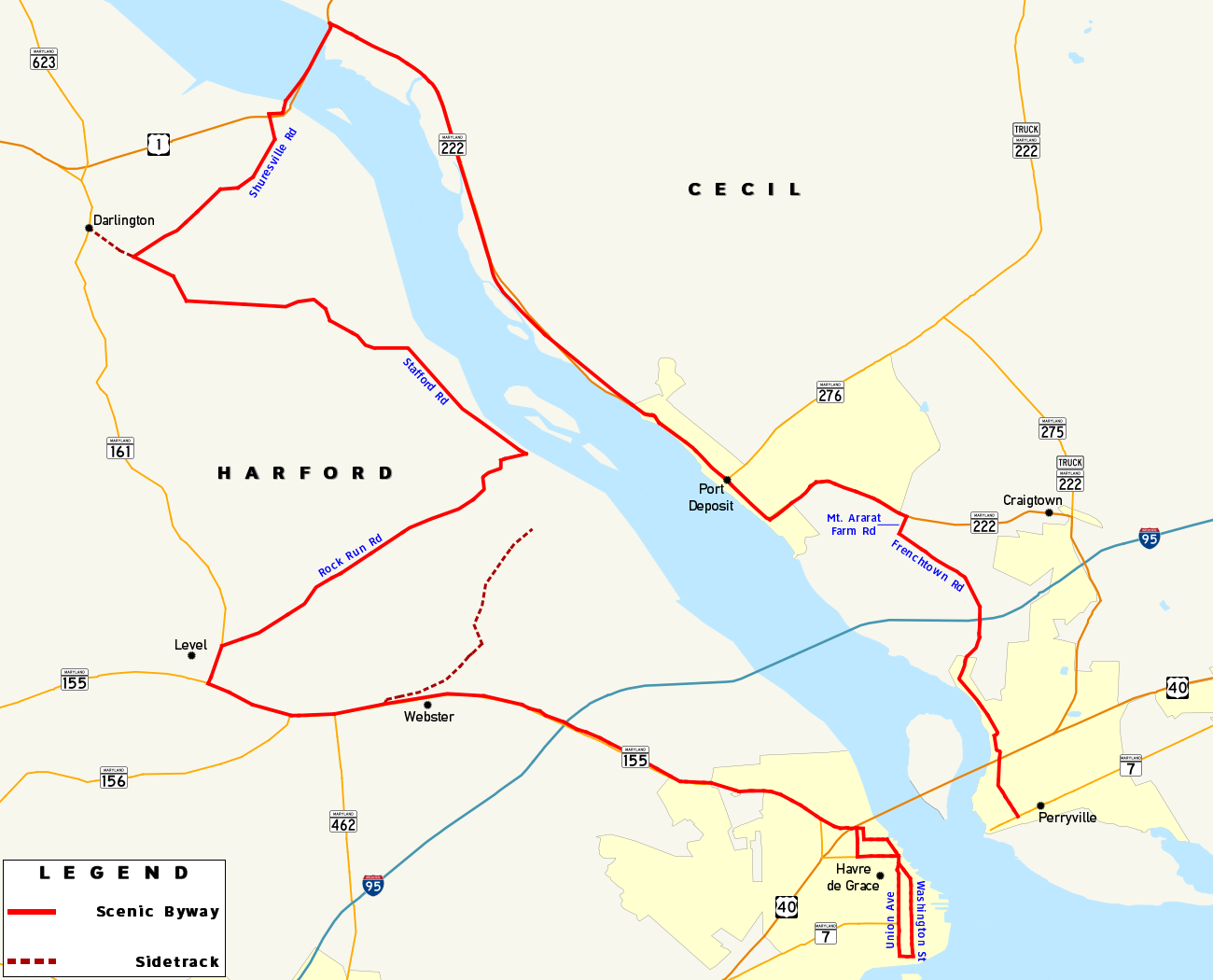
Map of the Lower Susquehanna Scenic Byway

The Lower Susquehanna Scenic Byway comprises 33 miles (53 km) of highway between Havre de Grace and Perryville serving historical and recreational destinations on both sides of Susquehanna River in eastern Harford County and western Cecil County. The byway begins in downtown Havre de Grace, the site of the Concord Point Light, the Havre de Grace Maritime Museum, and the Havre de Grace Decoy Museum. The byway uses Union Avenue and Washington Street to head away from the Chesapeake Bay to the northern edge of the city, then Water Street and Erie Street to the location of the Susquehanna Museum of Havre de Grace, located at the southern end of the Susquehanna and Tidewater Canal. In the northern part of Havre de Grace, the byway also follows Otsego Street and Juniata Street. The two paths merge into one at Superior Street, which heads west under the Thomas J. Hatem Memorial Bridge and becomes part of MD 155 heading northwest out of the city.

The Lower Susquehanna Scenic Byway follows MD 155 (Level Road) west past I-95 to Webster Lapidum Road, where a spur of the byway splits to the northeast. The spur continues onto Quaker Bottom Road to the Steppingstone Museum. The main route of the byway follows MD 155 to Level, where it turns north onto MD 161 (Darlington Road) and then northeast onto Rock Run Road. Rock Run Road leads to Susquehanna State Park. Within the state park, the byway turns northwest onto Stafford Road, which parallels both the canal and the west bank of the river. At Deer Creek, the byway turns inland, following the creek then heading northwest toward Darlington. A spur of the byway continues northwest to MD 161 to pass through the village; the main route turns northeast onto Shuresville Road toward Conowingo Dam. Just west of the dam, there is access to an overlook and to the Lower Susquehanna Heritage Greenway Trail, which parallels the river south from the dam. The byway turns onto US 1 (Conowingo Road) to cross the river on top of the dam; while crossing the river, the byway is concurrent with the Mason and Dixon Scenic Byway.

The Lower Susquehanna Scenic Byway turns south onto MD 222 (Susquehanna River Road) to follow the east bank of the river. The byway passes through the town of Port Deposit, which contains the historic Gerry House. At the southern edge of town, MD 222 and the byway turn northeast to climb a high bluff above the town. On top of the bluff, the byway turns onto Mount Ararat Farm Road and then Frenchtown Road, which the route follows to its conclusion at MD 7 (Broad Street) in Perryville. Perryville contains Rodgers Tavern and the Perryville Railroad Museum, which are located west and east on MD 7, respectively.

== Charles Street ==
#11: Charles Street
- Location: Baltimore – Lutherville
- Length: 10 mi (16 km)

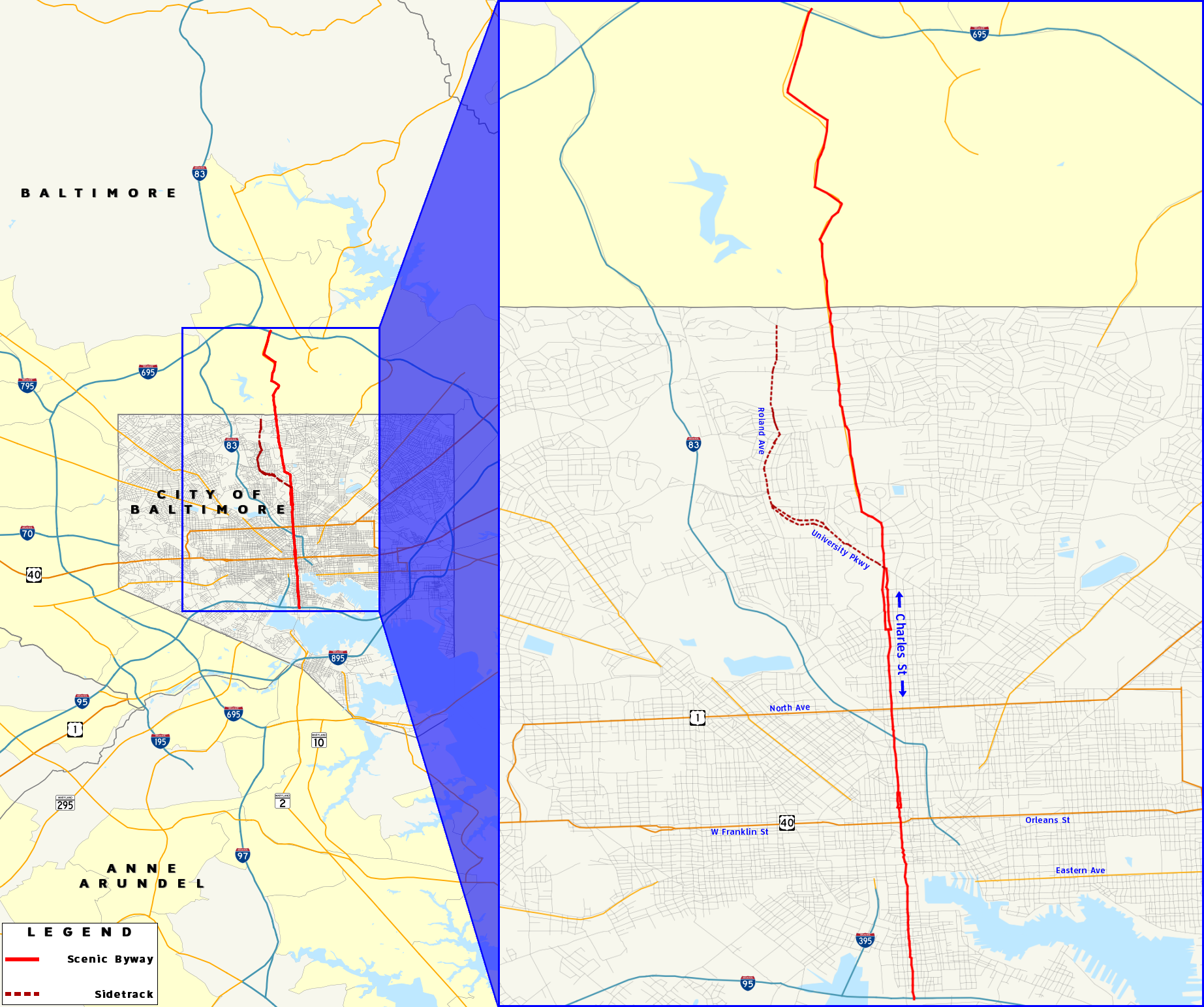
Map of the Charles Street Scenic Byway

The Charles Street Scenic Byway runs along Charles Street (MD 139) through Baltimore and north into Baltimore County, ending in Lutherville. Charles Street serves as Baltimore's main thoroughfare and passes through many cultural, residential, and commercial areas. The byway is a National Scenic Byway designated as Baltimore's Historic Charles Street.

Charles Street begins at the Inner Harbor, which is home to the National Aquarium in Baltimore, Maryland Science Center, and Port Discovery. Also nearby is the Little Italy neighborhood as well as Oriole Park at Camden Yards and M&T Bank Stadium. Farther north, the byway heads through Downtown Baltimore, which is home to many skyscrapers including One Charles Center. In the downtown area, there are many cultural sites including CFG Bank Arena and the Hippodrome Theatre. The road passes through the Cathedral Hill Historic District and the Mount Vernon neighborhood, where the original Washington Monument is located. The byway runs through Belvedere Row before reaching Druid Hill Park area, which is home to the Baltimore Museum of Art and the Maryland Zoo. Charles Street passes through the garden suburb of Roland Park before running through the Guilford neighborhood, where Sherwood Gardens is located. The road passes near Notre Dame of Maryland University and Loyola University Maryland before heading near Friends School of Baltimore and Cathedral of Mary Our Queen. Charles Street heads into Baltimore County, where MD 134 provides access to Lutherville and a spur serves Towson, a major commercial center. Charles Street ends at an interchange with I-695.

== National Historic Seaport ==
#12: National Historic Seaport
- Location: Baltimore
- Length: 7 mi (11 km)

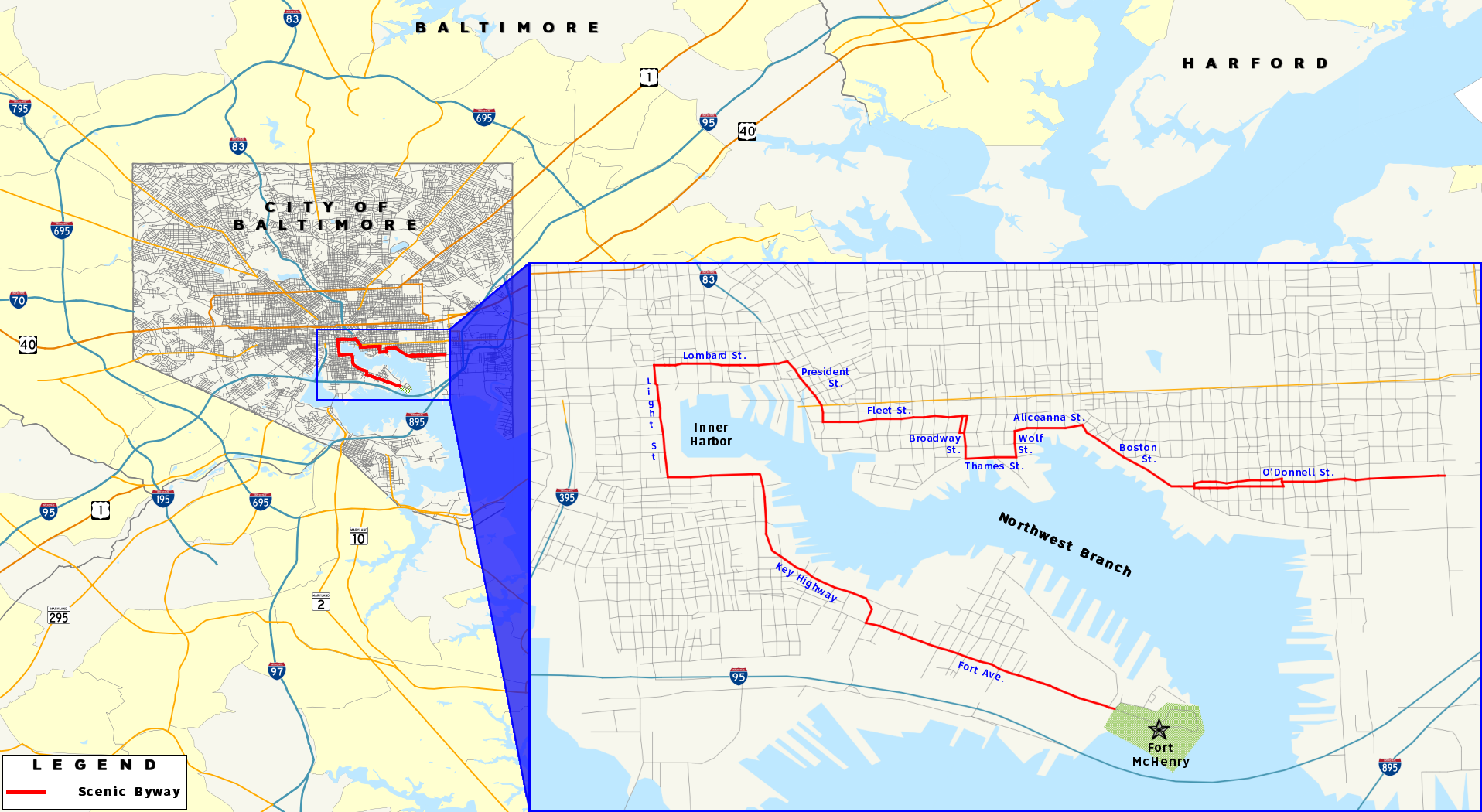
Map of the National Historic Seaport Scenic Byway

The National Historic Seaport Scenic Byway loops around the Inner Harbor of Baltimore, which is home to many historic sites.

The byway begins in the Canton neighborhood of Baltimore, which has restaurants, stores, and taverns. From here, the byway heads west on O'Donnell Street, passing through the Butchers Hill neighborhood. The National Historic Seaport Scenic Byway continues northwest on Boston Street, reaching Fells Point, a historic shipbuilding area that has many restaurants and shops as well as the Fells Point Maritime Museum. In this neighborhood, the byway heads west on Aliceanna Street, south on Wolfe Street, west on Thames Street, and north on Broadway. From Fells Point, the National Historic Seaport Scenic Byway continues west on Fleet Street to the Little Italy neighborhood, which has many Italian restaurants and shops. The byway turns north onto President Street, where the President Street Station and the Flag House & Star-Spangled Banner Museum are located. The byway turns west onto Lombard Street and heads into the Inner Harbor area, turning south onto Light Street. In this area is the National Aquarium in Baltimore, Baltimore Maritime Museum, Baltimore World Trade Center, and Maryland Science Center. At the Maryland Science Center, the National Historic Seaport Scenic Byway turns east onto Key Highway, passing the Baltimore Museum of Industry and the American Visionary Art Museum. The byway continues on Fort Avenue to the Locust Point neighborhood, which is where Fort McHenry is located.

== Star-Spangled Banner ==
#13: Star-Spangled Banner
- Location: Solomons–Baltimore
- Length: 106 mi (171 km)

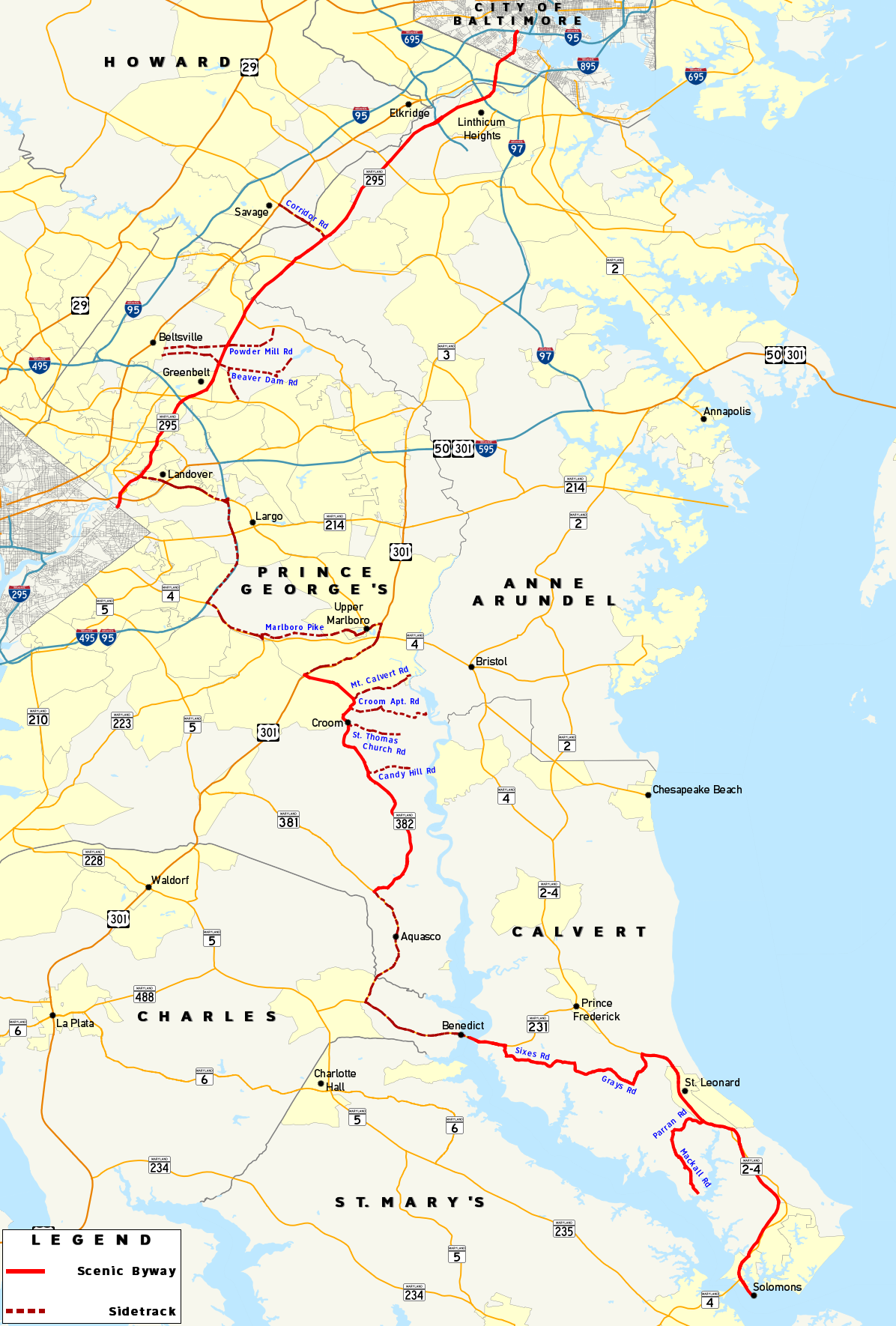
Map of the Star-Spangled Banner Scenic Byway

The Star-Spangled Banner Scenic Byway runs from Solomons to Baltimore, providing access to sites related to the War of 1812.

The byway begins in Solomons, a fishing village on the Chesapeake Bay that is home to the Calvert Marine Museum that has artifacts related to the Chesapeake Bay Flotilla. From Solomons, the byway follows MD 2/MD 4, passing near Calvert Cliffs State Park and Flag Ponds Nature Park, with a spur to the Jefferson Patterson Park and Museum. The Star-Spangled Banner Scenic Byway continues along MD 265, MD 264, and Grays Road before turning west on MD 506 and passing Battle Creek Cypress Swamp. The byway follows Sixes Road to MD 231, reaching Benedict, a landing point for British troops heading inland along the Patuxent River in August 1814. The Star-Spangled Banner Scenic Byway heads north along MD 381, MD 382, and US 301 to Upper Marlboro, a town the British occupied on their way to Washington, D.C. In Upper Marlboro is the Mount Calvert Historical and Archaeological Park, Croom Airport, and The Show Place Arena. From here, the byway follows MD 4, I-495, and MD 202 to Bladensburg, which has a park along the Anacostia River and was the site of the Battle of Bladensburg on August 24, 1814, a British victory that allowed for the invasion of Washington, D.C. Past Bladensburg, the Star-Spangled Banner Scenic Byway heads north on the Baltimore-Washington Parkway past many cultural sites to Baltimore. In Baltimore, the byway heads east on Ostend Street, south on Hanover Street, and east on Fort Avenue to reach Fort McHenry. Fort McHenry is the site of the Battle of Fort McHenry in which American troops defeated the British navy who was attempting to capture Baltimore. This battle inspired Francis Scott Key to write "The Star-Spangled Banner".

== Booth's Escape ==
#14: Booth's Escape
- Location: Washington, D.C. – Popes Creek
- Length: 66 mi (106 km)

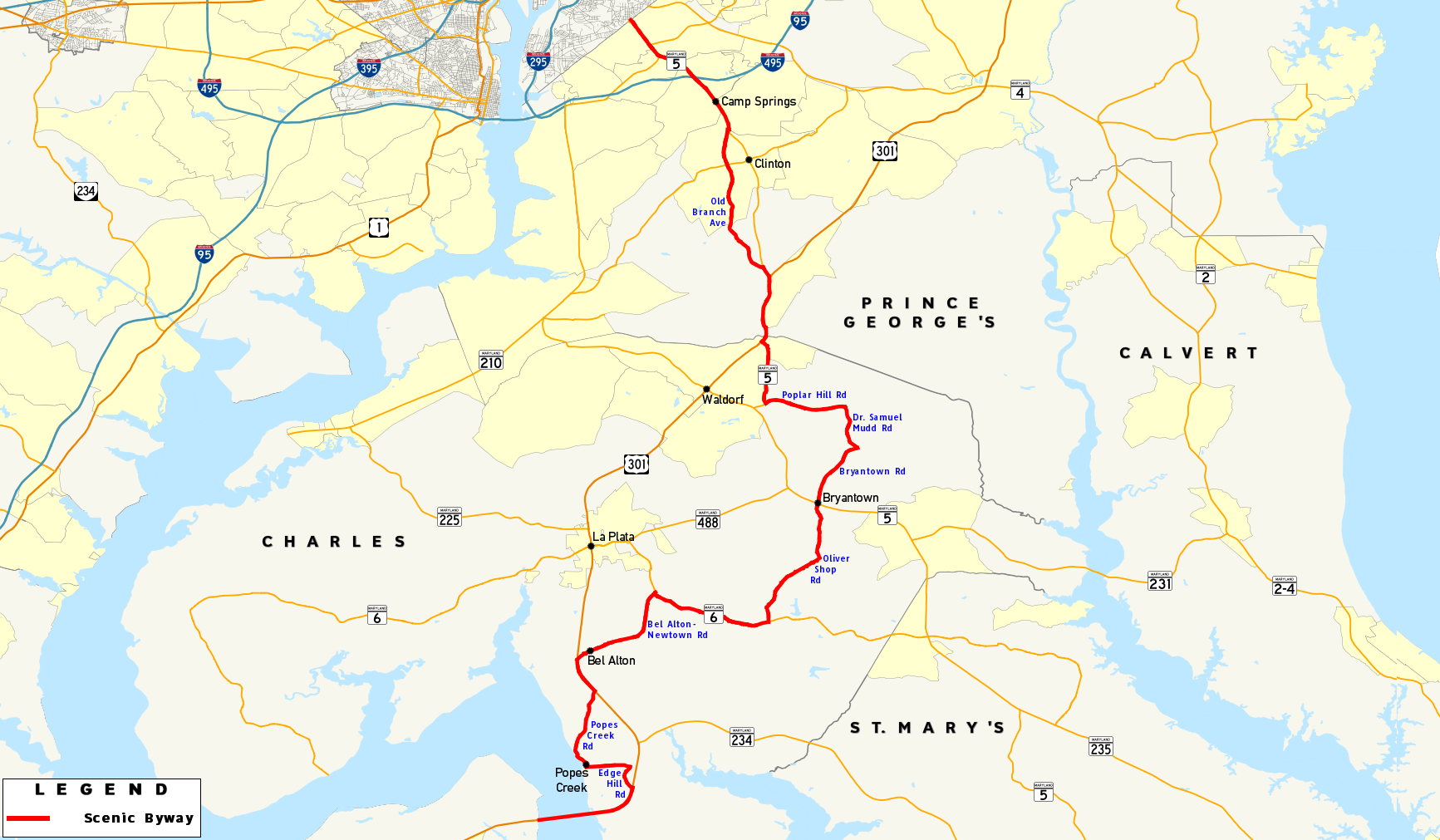
Map of the Booth's Escape Scenic Byway

The Booth's Escape Scenic Byway follows the route John Wilkes Booth and accomplice David Herold escaped from Washington, D.C., on after assassinating President Abraham Lincoln at Ford's Theater in Washington, D.C., on April 14, 1865, shortly after the American Civil War ended.

The byway begins in Washington, D.C., following Pennsylvania Avenue and Branch Avenue to the Maryland border. In Maryland, the route runs along MD 5 before continuing along Old Branch Avenue to Clinton. Here, the Surratt House Museum is located in a tavern that was a Confederate safehouse where Booth and Herold came to after the assassination to stock on supplies; the owner Mary Surratt was convicted and executed in the plot to assassinate Lincoln. From Clinton, Booth's Escape Scenic Byway continues along Brandywine Road and MD 5 to Waldorf. The byway continues east on Poplar Hill Road, reaching the Dr. Samuel A. Mudd House, where physician Samuel Mudd treated Booth's broken leg on April 15, 1865, perhaps unaware that he had assassinated Lincoln. The route turns south onto Dr. Mudd Road and Bryantown Road to Bryantown, where Dr. Mudd claimed to have first learned of the assassination. The road becomes Olivers Shop Road and comes to St. Mary's Church and Cemetery, where Dr. Mudd is buried, and also passes by Zekiah Swamp. The byway heads west on MD 6 before turning southwest onto Bel Alton Newtown Road, where it comes to the home of Samuel Cox near Bel Alton, where Booth and Herold hid for several days. The Booth's Escape Scenic Byway continues south along US 301. A detour north along US 301 and west along MD 6 provides access to Port Tobacco, a former Indian settlement that became a seaport and was the county seat of Charles County during the Civil War. The mainline of the byway continues south along US 301 and onto Popes Creek Road, coming to the Potomac River at a site where Booth and Herold accidentally rowed into the Nanjemoy Creek and spent the night before later crossing the Potomac River. The Booth's Escape Scenic Byway heads east and continues south along Edge Hill Road and US 301 to the Virginia border, where in Port Royal Booth was captured and killed at a farm outside of town.

== Roots and Tides ==
#15: Roots and Tides
- Location: Plum Point – Annapolis
- Length: 47 mi (76 km)

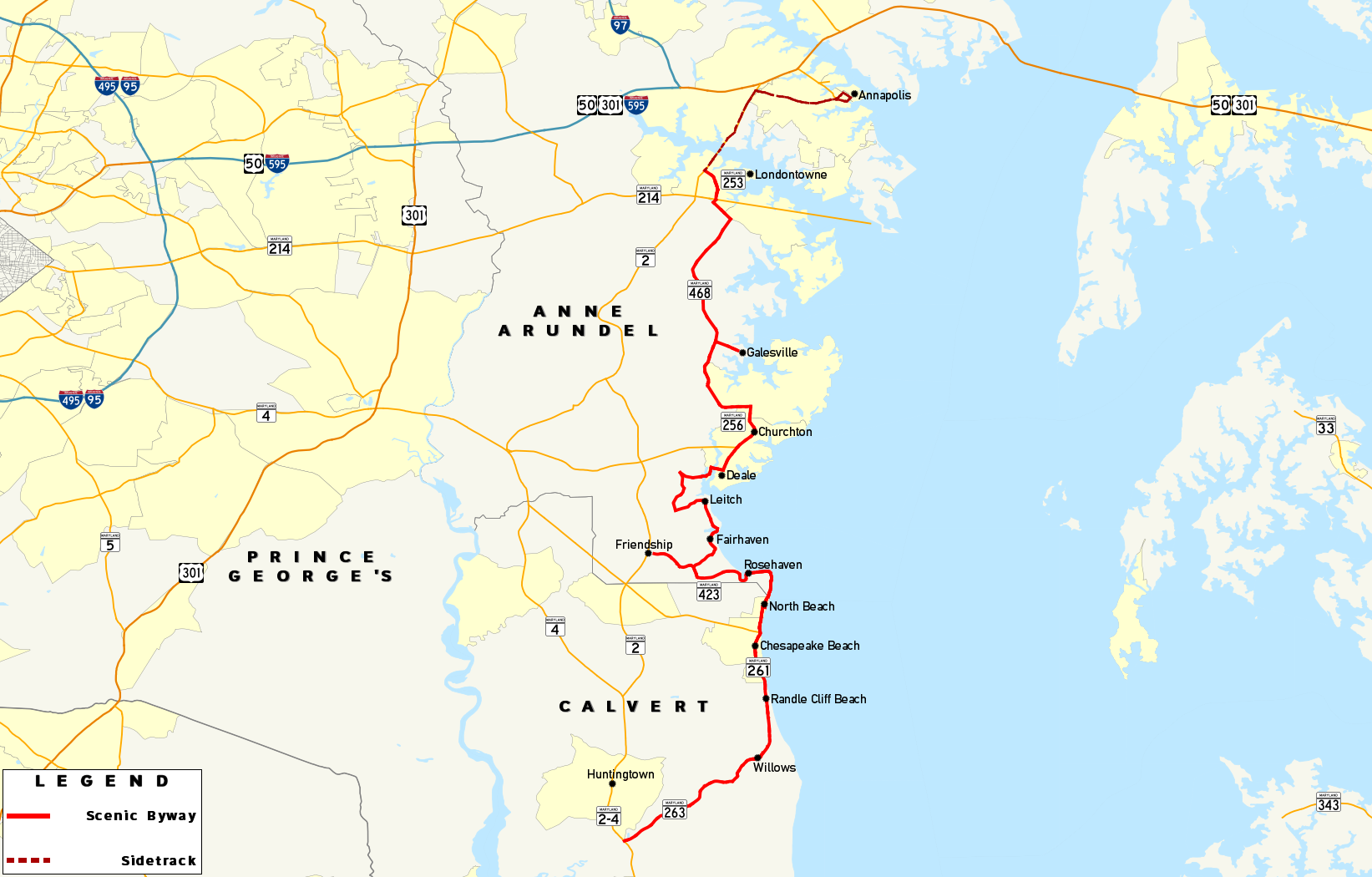
Map of the Roots and Tides Scenic Byway

The Roots and Tides Scenic Byway runs from Plum Point to Annapolis, running through communities along the western shore of the Chesapeake Bay.

The byway begins at Plum Point on the Chesapeake Bay, heading west on MD 263 before turning north onto MD 261. The road passes through Willows, with a beach a short distance to the east on the bay, before reaching Chesapeake Beach and North Beach, which have marinas, antique shops, and bed and breakfasts and were once popular resorts for residents of Baltimore and Washington, D.C. Chesapeake Beach is home to the historic Chesapeake Beach Railway Station, which serves as a museum. The byway continues north along MD 261 before following Fairhaven Road north to Fairhaven. The road continues as MD 423 and Town Point Road, passing west of Herring Bay. The route follows Leitch Road west and Franklin Gibson Road north, heading north onto MD 256. The Roots and Tides Scenic Byway continues north along MD 468 and comes to Galesville, where the Galesville Heritage Museum and the Capt. Salem Avery House are located. Past here, the road passes the Smithsonian Environmental Research Center. The byway turns northwest onto MD 214 and north onto MD 253, coming to Londontowne, where the London Town Publik House is located. The Roots and Tides Scenic Byway heads north on MD 2 before following West Street and Rowe Boulevard through Annapolis, the state capital of Maryland that is home to several 18th-century buildings, the Maryland State House and the U.S. Naval Academy.

== Religious Freedom ==
#16: Religious Freedom
- Location: Port Tobacco – Point Lookout
- Length: 189 mi (304 km)

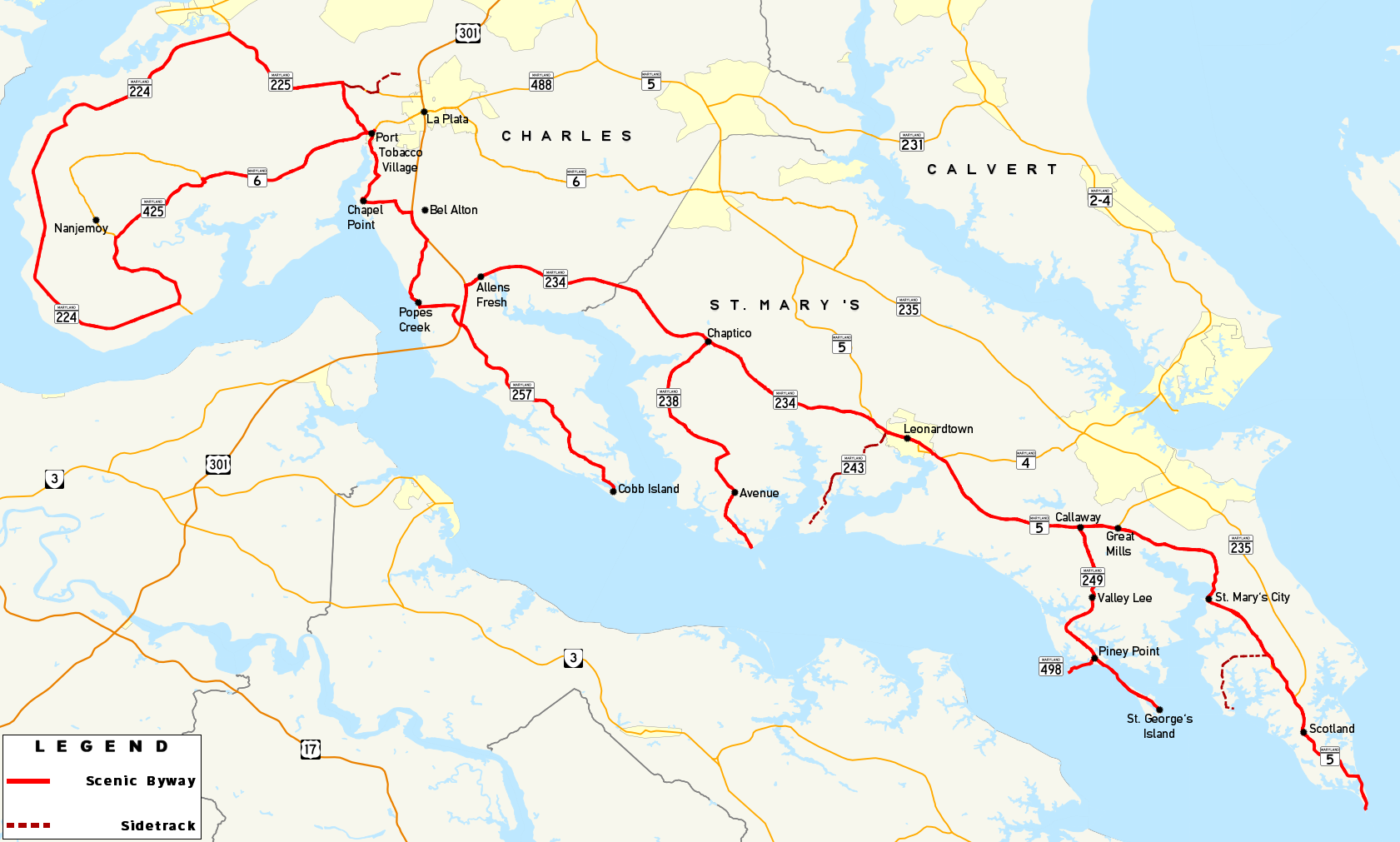
Map of the Religious Freedom Byway

The Religious Freedom Byway (formerly Religious Freedom Tour Scenic Byway) runs across Southern Maryland from Port Tobacco to Point Lookout past colonial settlements where English settlers came for religious freedom, with some of the oldest churches in the United States along the byway. The byway is a National Scenic Byway.

The upper loop of the byway begins in Port Tobacco, an Indian village that became home to a missionary founded by Jesuit Father Andrew White and is also home to the Port Tobacco Courthouse. The byway heads southwest on MD 6, passing through Welcome, where the Christ Church-Durham Parish is located. The route follows MD 425 and MD 6 again. It loops north and follows MD 224, coming to Purse State Park and Smallwood State Park. The byway turns southeast along MD 225 and passes Myrtle Grove Wildlife Management Area. The Religious Freedom Byway turns south onto Rose Hill Road and comes to the Thomas Stone National Historic Site, which was home to Thomas Stone, a signer of the Declaration of Independence. From here, the loop returns to Port Tobacco.

From Port Tobacco, the Religious Freedom Byway continues south along Chapel Point Road, passing St. Thomas Manor and reaching Chapel Point State Park. The byway heads south along US 301 and Popes Creek Road to Popes Creek. At this point, a spur of the byway follows MD 257 and MD 254 to Cobb Island, where Christ Protestant Episcopal Church is located. The mainline of the byway continues along MD 234 across Zekiah Swamp before coming to Chaptico, a port settlement where Christ Episcopal Church is located. The Religious Freedom Byway continues south along MD 238 and MD 242 to Coltons Point on the Potomac River, where St. Clement's Island State Park is located. St. Clement's Island is considered the "Birthplace of Maryland" where in 1634, the first Catholic mass in the British American colonies was celebrated.

From Chaptico, the Religious Freedom Byway continues east along MD 234, with a detour along MD 243 providing access to the St. Francis Xavier Church, the oldest Catholic church in Maryland. The byway heads east onto MD 5 into Leonardtown, which is home to the Old Jail Museum and Tudor Hall. The road continues to Callaway, where a spur along MD 249 serves St. George's Episcopal Church in Valley Lee, the oldest Episcopal church in Maryland, and Piney Point Light. The mainline of the byway continues along MD 5 to St. Mary's City, which was the capital of Maryland until 1695 and has the first Catholic church in the British American colonies as well as Trinity Episcopal Church and St. Mary's College of Maryland. The Religious Freedom Byway continues to Point Lookout State Park, which was a summer resort that also served as a prison for Confederate troops during the American Civil War.

== Chesapeake Country ==
#17: Chesapeake Country
- Location: Chesapeake City – Crisfield
- Length: 419 mi (674 km)

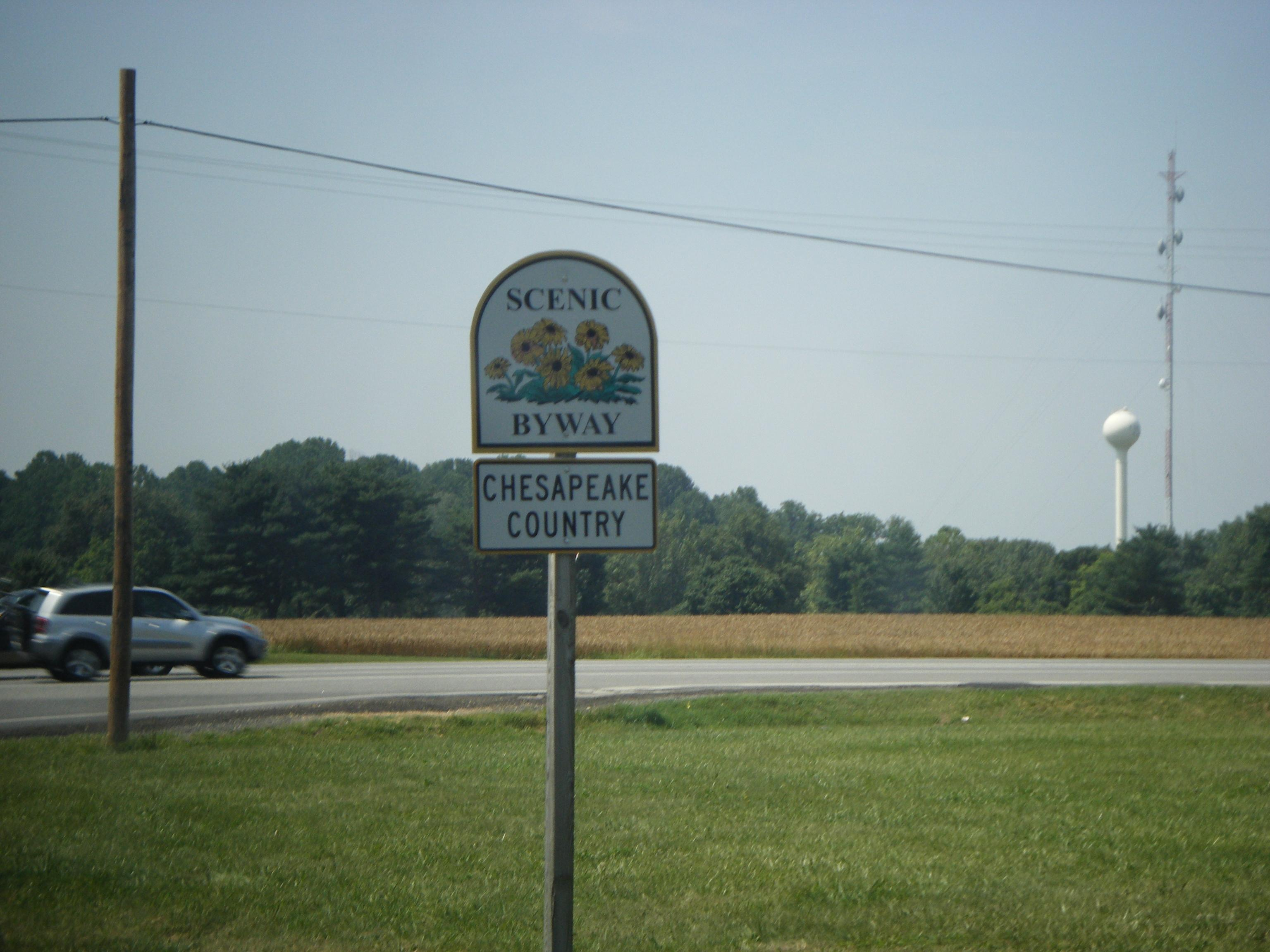
State-designated signage for Chesapeake Country Scenic Byway on MD 213 near Wye Mills.

The Chesapeake Country Scenic Byway serves sites along the Chesapeake Bay in the Eastern Shore region, running from Chesapeake City south to Crisfield. The National Scenic Byway portion runs from Stevensville, near the Chesapeake Bay Bridge to the Chesapeake and Delaware Canal in Chesapeake City and has a spur to Eastern Neck Island in the Chester River. The main route runs mostly along MD 18 and MD 213, former main roads that have since been bypassed by US 50 and US 301. The spur runs along MD 20 and MD 445. A state-designated extension of the national byway continues across the Bay Bridge, into Annapolis, then back onto the Eastern Shore and heads south toward Crisfield. Both the national and state-designated sections of the byway run past many towns and buildings that remain preserved from the 18th and 19th centuries, passing through farmland and waterfront areas on the Chesapeake Bay.

The Upper Eastern Shore section of the byway begins in Chesapeake City, a town located at the western end of the Chesapeake and Delaware Canal. The byway heads south on MD 213, coming to Cecilton, where MD 282 heads west to Crystal Beach on the Elk River. The road crosses the Sassafras River and passes through Georgetown, a community that was burned by the British during the War of 1812. The Chesapeake Country Scenic Byway continues along MD 213 through Galena and Kennedyville, with a detour along MD 298 and MD 292 serving the Victorian resort town of Betterton. The mainline of the byway comes to Chestertown, a port on the Chester River that has many historical buildings. At this point, a branch of the byway continues west along MD 20 to Rock Hall, a town on the Chesapeake Bay with many marinas, before following MD 445 to the Eastern Neck National Wildlife Refuge. From Chestertown, the mainline of the Chesapeake Country Scenic Byway continues along MD 213 to Church Hill, where St. Luke's Episcopal Church and Church Hill Theatre are located. The next town along the road is Centreville, which is home to the Museum of Eastern Shore Life and the Queen Anne's County Courthouse, the oldest active courthouse in Maryland. From Centreville, the byway follows MD 18 west to Queenstown, which has many Colonial buildings, and Grasonville. The road heads onto Kent Island, an island where a trading post was founded in 1631 that has many seafood restaurants. The Chesapeake Country Scenic Byway comes to Stevensville, which is home to the Cray House and the Stevensville Train Depot. At this point, a connection for the byway crosses the Chesapeake Bay Bridge to Annapolis.

From Centreville, the Mid-Shore Section of the Chesapeake Country Scenic Byway continues on MD 213, with a spur along US 50 providing access to the Wye Mills Natural Resource Management Area. The byway heads into Wye Mills and heads south on MD 662, passing by the site of Wye Oak, which was the largest white oak tree in the United States until it was destroyed during a storm in 2002. The byway continues along MD 662 before picking up US 50 and coming to Easton, a historical town which is home to the Avalon Theatre and the Academy Art Museum. From Easton, a branch of the Chesapeake Country Scenic Byway heads west on MD 33 to St. Michaels, a shipbuilding town that is home to the Chesapeake Bay Maritime Museum, before heading to Tilghman Island, where several restaurants and marinas. The byway heads back along MD 33 before heading onto MD 329 and crossing the Tred Avon River on the Oxford–Bellevue Ferry, one of the oldest ferries in the country, to Oxford, a maritime town home to the Oxford Museum and the Oxford Customs House. From here, the Chesapeake Country Scenic Byway follows MD 333 back to Easton, at which point it heads east along MD 331, crossing the Choptank River on the Dover Bridge. The byway continues to Preston, following MD 16 south to East New Market, a Native American trading post that became a center of Methodism. The Chesapeake Country Scenic Byway follows MD 14 through the fishing community of Secretary before running along MD 16 to Cambridge, which has sites related to the Underground Railroad and Harriet Tubman as well as the Richardson Maritime Museum and Boatworks. The byway continues along MD 343 to Hudson, where the Sharps Island Light can be seen, before heading back to Cambridge. At this point, a branch of the byway heads south along MD 341 and Maple Dam Road into the Blackwater National Wildlife Refuge, which is home to the largest amount of bald eagles on the East Coast. Another branch of the byway continues south along MD 335, passing to the west of the Blackwater National Wildlife Refuge before reaching Hooper's Island. Another branch of the Chesapeake Country Scenic Byway known as the Elliott's Island Branch splits to the east and passes through the Fishing Bay Wildlife Management Area. From here, the byway heads north along the Nanticoke River to Vienna and Eldorado. The byway continues north to Federalsburg, where the Idylwild Wildlife Management Area is located.

The Lower Eastern Shore section of the Chesapeake Country Scenic Byway begins in Vienna and heads east and south along US 50, MD 54, Old Railroad Road, and MD 347 to Quantico. From here, a branch of the byway heads east along MD 349 to Salisbury, which is home to the Poplar Hill Mansion, the Ward Museum of Wildfowl Art, and the Salisbury Zoo. The byway continues west along MD 349, with a branch serving Nanticoke, and MD 352 to the Whitehaven Ferry across the Wicomico River. The Chesapeake County Scenic Byway follows MD 362 east to Princess Anne, a historic town founded in 1733 that is home to the Teackle Mansion. From here, a branch of the byway heads west along MD 363 to Deal Island, where waterfowl may be viewed in a wildlife area. The mainline of the Chesapeake County Scenic Byway follows US 13 and MD 413 to Crisfield, a community on the Chesapeake Bay that is known as the "Crab Capital of the World". In Crisfield is the J. Millard Tawes Historical Museum and the Ward Brothers' House and Shop, and Janes Island State Park. From Crisfield, a ferry provides access to Smith Island in the middle of the Chesapeake Bay.

The Lower Eastern Shore section of the Chesapeake Country Scenic Byway was originally the western portion of the Blue Crab Scenic Byway.

== Harriet Tubman Underground Railroad ==
#18: Harriet Tubman Underground Railroad
- Location: Cambridge–Greensboro
- Length: 144 mi (232 km)

The Harriet Tubman Underground Railroad Byway runs from Cambridge to Greensboro, following the route of the Underground Railroad, a secret path by which many slaves fled the South to the free states and Southern Ontario. The byway is an All-American Road.

The byway begins in Cambridge, where there is a visitors center at Sailwinds Park along with many historical sites in the Cambridge Historic District. Also in Cambridge is the Harriet Tubman Museum and Educational Center, which showcases Harriet Tubman, a conductor on the Underground Railroad who helped many slaves to freedom. From Cambridge, the byway heads south along MD 341 before heading west on MD 16 to the Stanley Institute, an African American schoolhouse, and Church Creek, a shipbuilding town. A branch of the byway follows MD 16 to Taylors Island on the Chesapeake Bay, passing by Old Trinity Church and Stewart's Canal. The Harriet Tubman Underground Railroad Scenic Byway continues south along MD 335 to Harriet Tubman Underground Railroad State Park, where the Harriet Tubman Underground Railroad Visitor Center focused on Tubman and the Underground Railroad is located, and Harriet Tubman Underground Railroad National Historical Park. From here, the byway heads east on Key Wallace Drive through the Blackwater National Wildlife Refuge before heading onto Greenbrier Road and passing near the Brodess Farm, where Tubman spent her younger years. The byway heads north on Bucktown Road, passing by the Bucktown Village Store. A branch from Bucktown serves the Fishing Bay Wildlife Management Area. The mainline of the byway heads back to Cambridge and follows MD 16, US 50, and MD 16 again to East New Market. A detour onto MD 14 provides access to the Mt. Zion United Methodist Church. The Harriet Tubman Underground Railroad Scenic Byway continues along MD 16 to Preston, where the Linchester gristmill is located along with the site of a Quaker meeting house that was said to be a station on the Underground Railroad. The Poplar Neck Loop of the byway runs through countryside that was home to Tubman's parents. From Preston, the route continues along MD 16 to Potters Landing, a crossing point for slaves on the Underground Railroad, and Martinak State Park. The byway continues along MD 313 to Denton, where several sites related to the Underground Railroad are located including Courthouse Square, the Tuckahoe Neck Meeting House, and the Museum of Rural Life. At this point, a spur of the byway provides access to the Tuckahoe River near the birthplace of Frederick Douglass. From Denton, the Harriet Tubman Underground Railroad Scenic Byway continues along MD 313 to Greensboro, where it passes through the town along MD 314 and MD 480. From Greensboro, the byway heads north on MD 313 and MD 311 to Goldsboro and east on MD 287 to the Delaware border, connecting to the Harriet Tubman Underground Railroad Byway of the Delaware Byways system.

== Cape to Cape ==
#19: Cape to Cape
- Location: Ocean City – Snow Hill
- Length: 79 mi (127 km)

The Cape to Cape Scenic Byway provides access to sites along the Atlantic Ocean and its back bays in Worcester County, running between Ocean City and the Virginia border south of Snow Hill.

The byway begins in Ocean City, Maryland's largest seaside resort that is home to 10 miles of beaches along the Atlantic Ocean, hotels, amusement rides, a boardwalk, and several water activities. From here, the Cape to Cape Scenic Byway heads south on MD 528, west on US 50 and south on MD 611, with a branch heading to Assateague Island, a barrier island on the Atlantic Ocean known for its wild ponies. The Cape to Cape Scenic Byway heads west along MD 376 to Berlin, a 19th-century town that has the Calvin B. Taylor House. The byway heads south through Berlin on MD 818 before it continues south along US 113. The Cape to Cape Scenic Byway follows US 113 Business into Snow Hill, a historic town where the Julia A. Purnell Museum is located. A spur heads east on MD 365 to the Chincoteague Bay. From Snow Hill, the byway follows MD 12 south to the Virginia border, with spurs east along Taylor Landing Road and MD 366 toward the Chincoteague Bay.

The Cape to Cape Scenic Byway was originally the eastern portion of the Blue Crab Scenic Byway.
