= Pope's Creek =

Pope's Creek may refer to some locations in the United States:

Waterways

- Popes Creek (Virginia)
- Popes Creek (Maryland)

Communities

- Popes Creek, Maryland
