= Brickhill (disambiguation) =

Brickhill is a civil parish in northern Bedford in Bedfordshire, England.

Brickhill or Brick Hill may also refer to:

== Places ==
- Brick Hill (Baltimore, Maryland), US
- Brick Hill (Hong Kong) or Nam Long Shan, Hong Kong

=== England ===
- Bow Brickhill, Buckinghamshire
- Great Brickhill, Buckinghamshire
- Little Brickhill, Buckinghamshire

== People ==
- Joan Brickhill (1924–2014), South African actress
- Paul Brickhill (1916–1991), Australian World War II fighter pilot, PoW and author

== See also ==
- Brinkhill
