= Roddy Road Covered Bridge =

- U.S. National Register of Historic Places
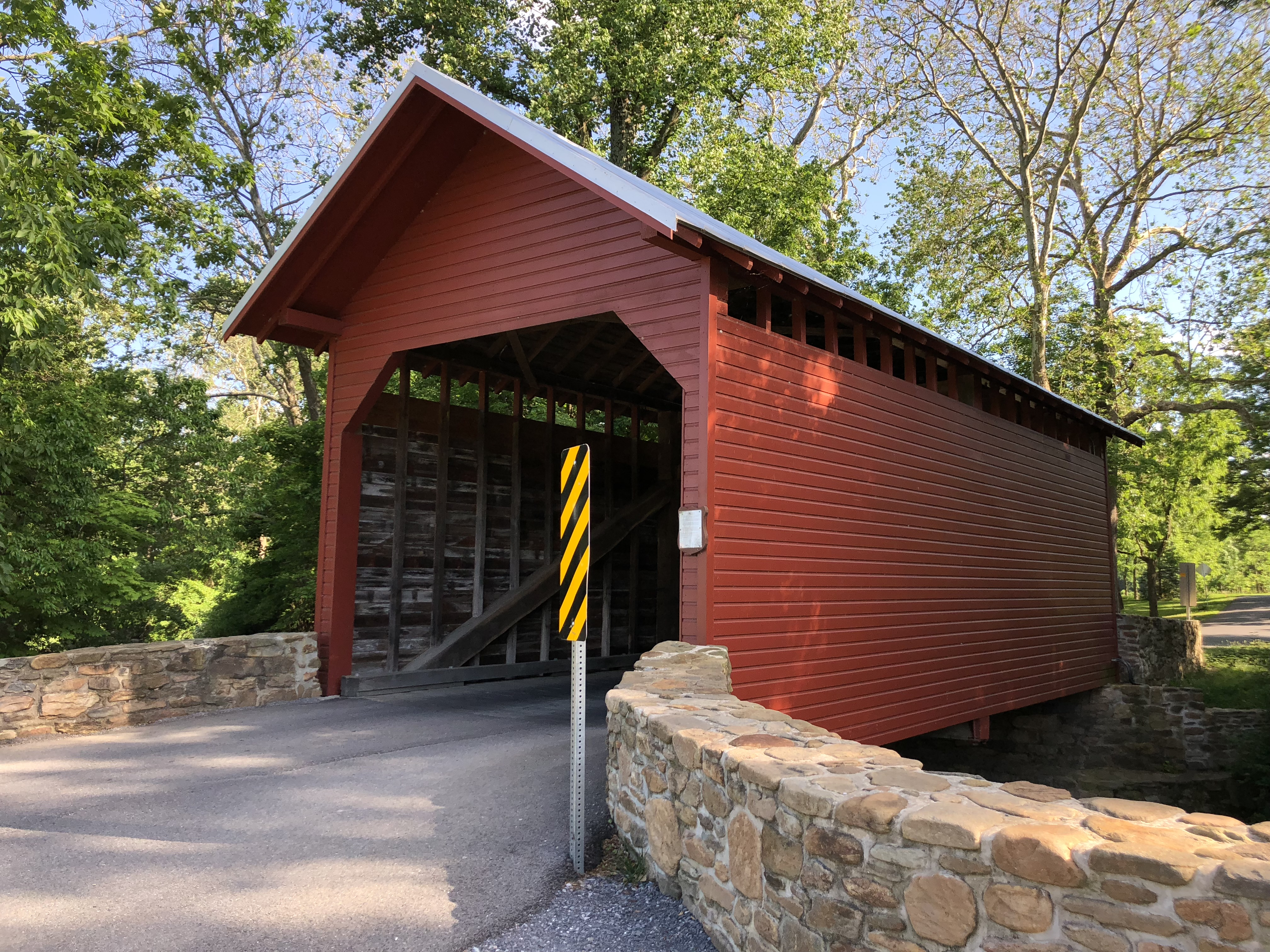
- Roddy Road Covered Bridge

- Location within Maryland Location within the United States
- Nearest city: Thurmont, Maryland
- Coordinates: 39°38′26″N 77°23′39″W
- Area: 0.2 acres (0.081 ha)
- Built: 1860
- Architectural style: Single king post
- MPS: Covered Bridges in Frederick County TR
- NRHP reference No.: 78003176
- Added to NRHP: June 23, 1978

The Roddy Road Covered Bridge is a small, one lane king post wooden covered bridge near Thurmont, Frederick County, Maryland. It crosses Owen's Creek near Thurmont. It is 40 feet long, 16 feet wide, with a 12 foot-8 inch clearance. It was built between 1850 and 1860.

It was listed on the National Register of Historic Places in 1978.
