= Fishing Bay Wildlife Management Area =

Protected area in Maryland, United States

- Location within Maryland
- Location: Dorchester, Maryland, United States
- Coordinates: 38°19′56″N 75°55′54″W
- Area: 29,000 acres (120 km^{2})
- Operator: Maryland Department of Natural Resources
- Website: Fishing Bay WMA

Fishing Bay Wildlife Management Area is a Wildlife Management Area in Dorchester County, Maryland. The area is the largest wildlife management area in Maryland. Adjoining Blackwater National Wildlife Refuge, the area is about 80 percent tidal marshland.
