= Swallow Falls State Park =

State park in Maryland, United States

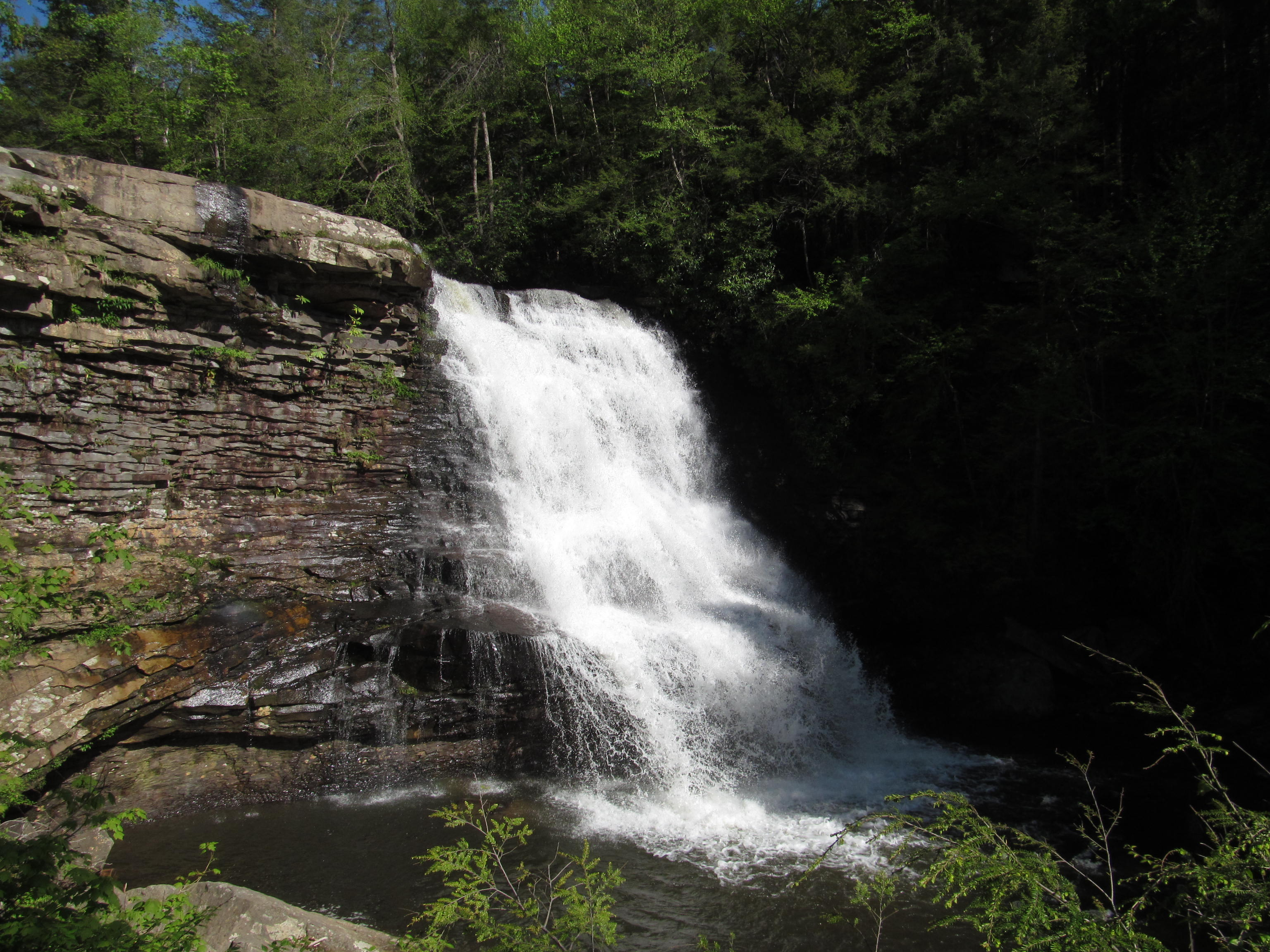
- Muddy Creek Falls

- Location within Maryland
- Location: Garrett County, Maryland, United States
- Nearest town: Oakland, Maryland
- Coordinates: 39°30′04″N 79°25′04″W
- Area: 257 acres (104 ha)
- Elevation: 2,297 ft (700 m)
- Established: 1930s
- Administrator: Maryland Department of Natural Resources
- Designation: Maryland state park
- Website: Official website

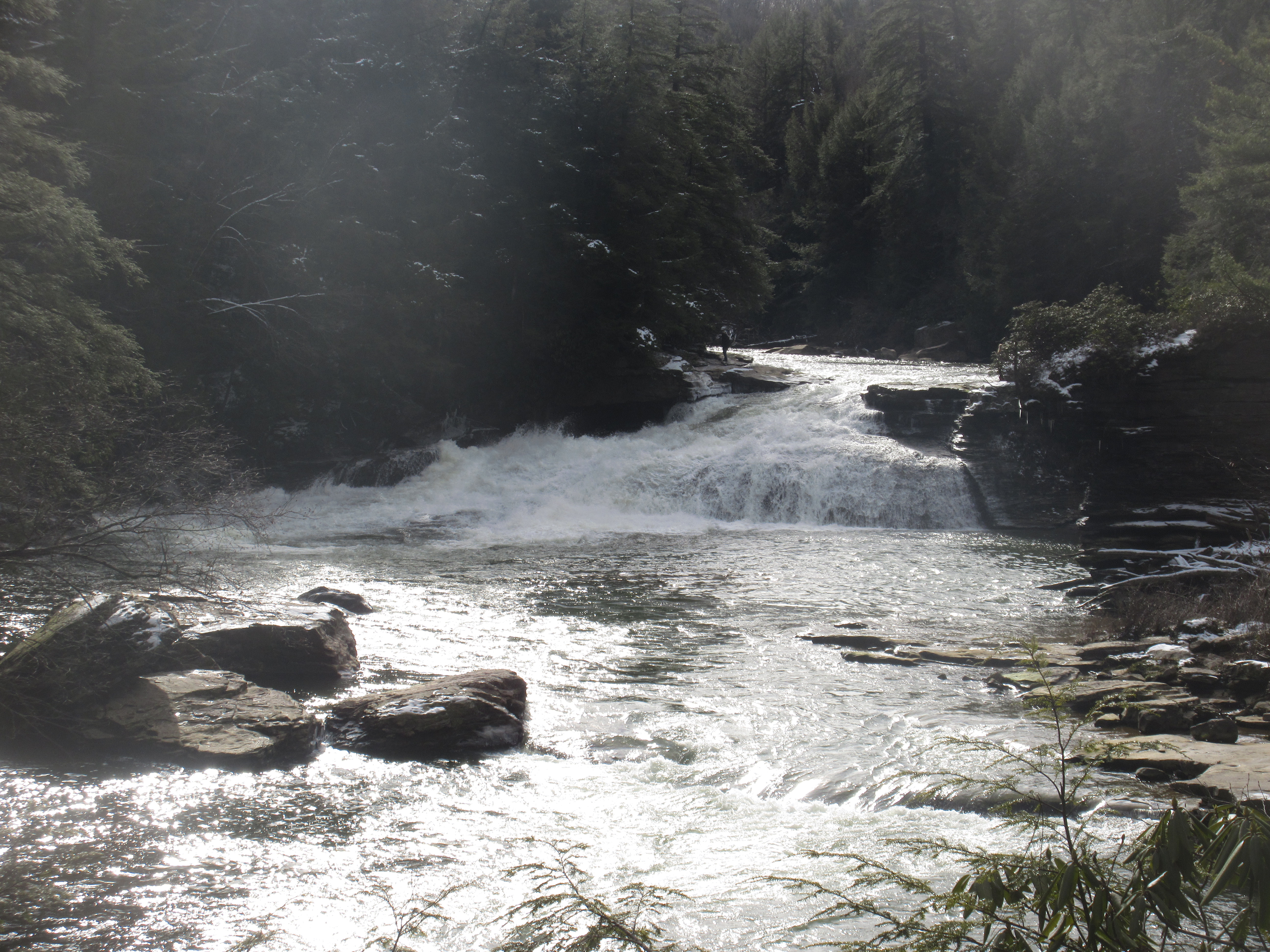
Upper Swallow Falls

Swallow Falls State Park is a Maryland state park located on the west bank of the Youghiogheny River nine miles (14 km) northwest of Oakland in Garrett County, Maryland, in the United States. The state park features Maryland's highest free-falling waterfall, the 53-foot (16 m) Muddy Creek Falls, as well as smaller waterfalls on the Youghiogheny River and Tolivar Creek. The park is notable for its stand of old hemlock trees, some more than 300 years old, "the last stand of its kind in Maryland."

== History ==
The park had its beginnings in 1906 with the donation by John and Robert Garrett of Baltimore of 1,917 acres (776 ha) to be used as a state forest. The land now known as Garrett State Forest included the areas that became Swallow Falls and Herrington Manor state parks, both of which were developed in the 1930s by the Civilian Conservation Corps. Notable persons who have visited the area include Thomas Edison, Henry Ford, John Burroughs, and Harvey Firestone, who camped at Muddy Creek Falls in the summers of 1918 and 1921.

== Activities and amenities ==
The park contains 65 campsites, a picnic area with a pavilion and playground, as well as a mile-long hiking trail through the old growth forest. A 5.5-mile (8.9 km) trail for hiking and mountain biking connects the state park with Herrington Manor State Park.

== See also ==
- List of waterfalls
