= Purse State Park =

State park in Maryland, United States

Purse Area of Nanjemoy WMA
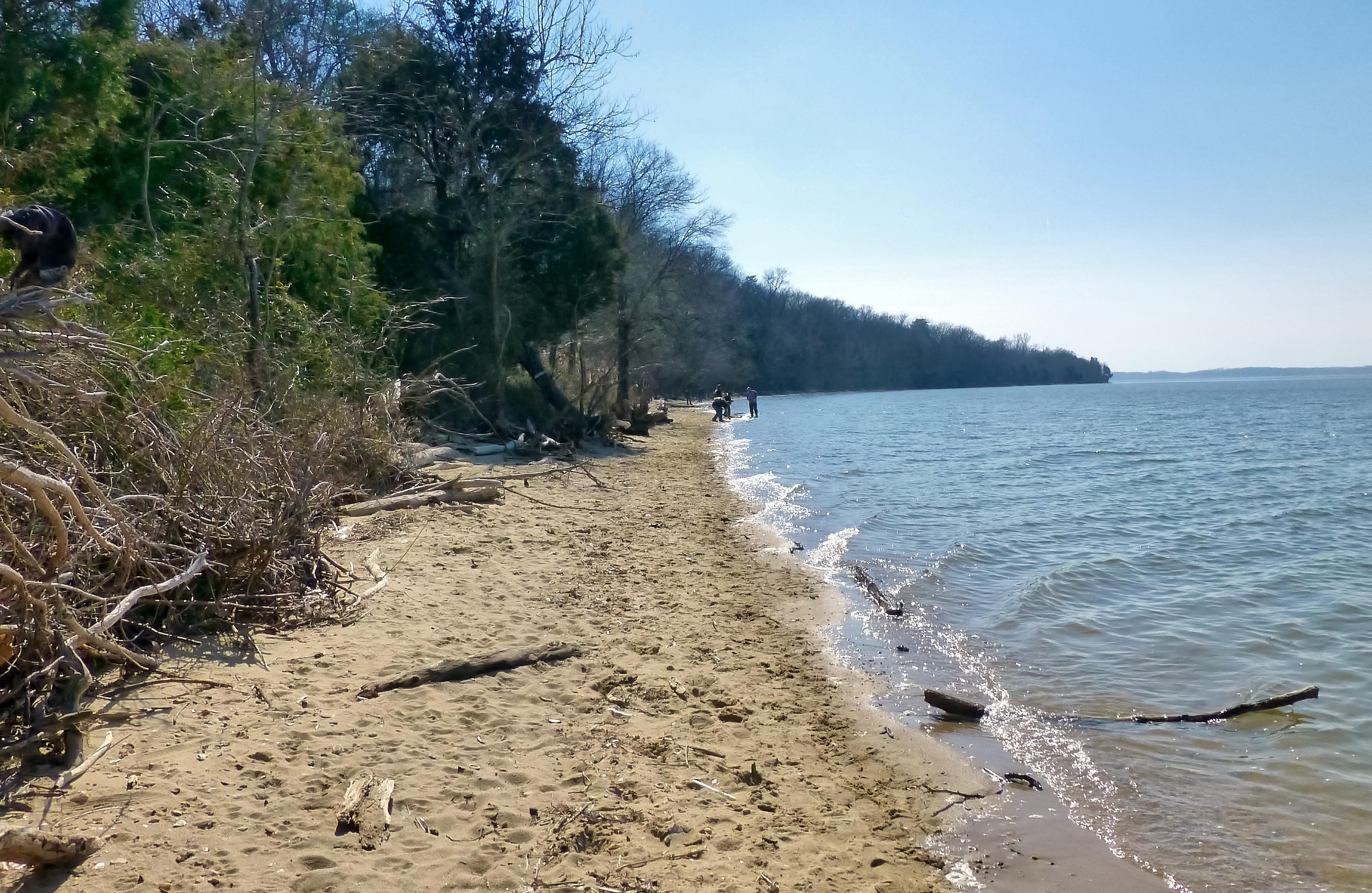
- Purse State Park, February 2017

- Location within Maryland Location within the United States
- Location: Charles, Maryland, United States
- Coordinates: 38°25′49″N 77°15′10″W
- Area: 149 acres (60 ha)
- Elevation: 3 ft (0.91 m)
- Established: Unspecified
- Operator: Maryland Department of Natural Resources
- Website: Nanjemoy WMA

Purse State Park is a former Maryland state park located on the Potomac River in Charles County that has been subsumed into the 1,365-acre (552 ha) Nanjemoy Wildlife Management Area. As the Purse Area, the former park is known for fossil hunting on the beaches of Wades Bay at the southern end of the Nanjemoy WMA. Fossil discoveries have included shark teeth and Cibicides.
