= Uniontown Academy =

- U.S. National Register of Historic Places
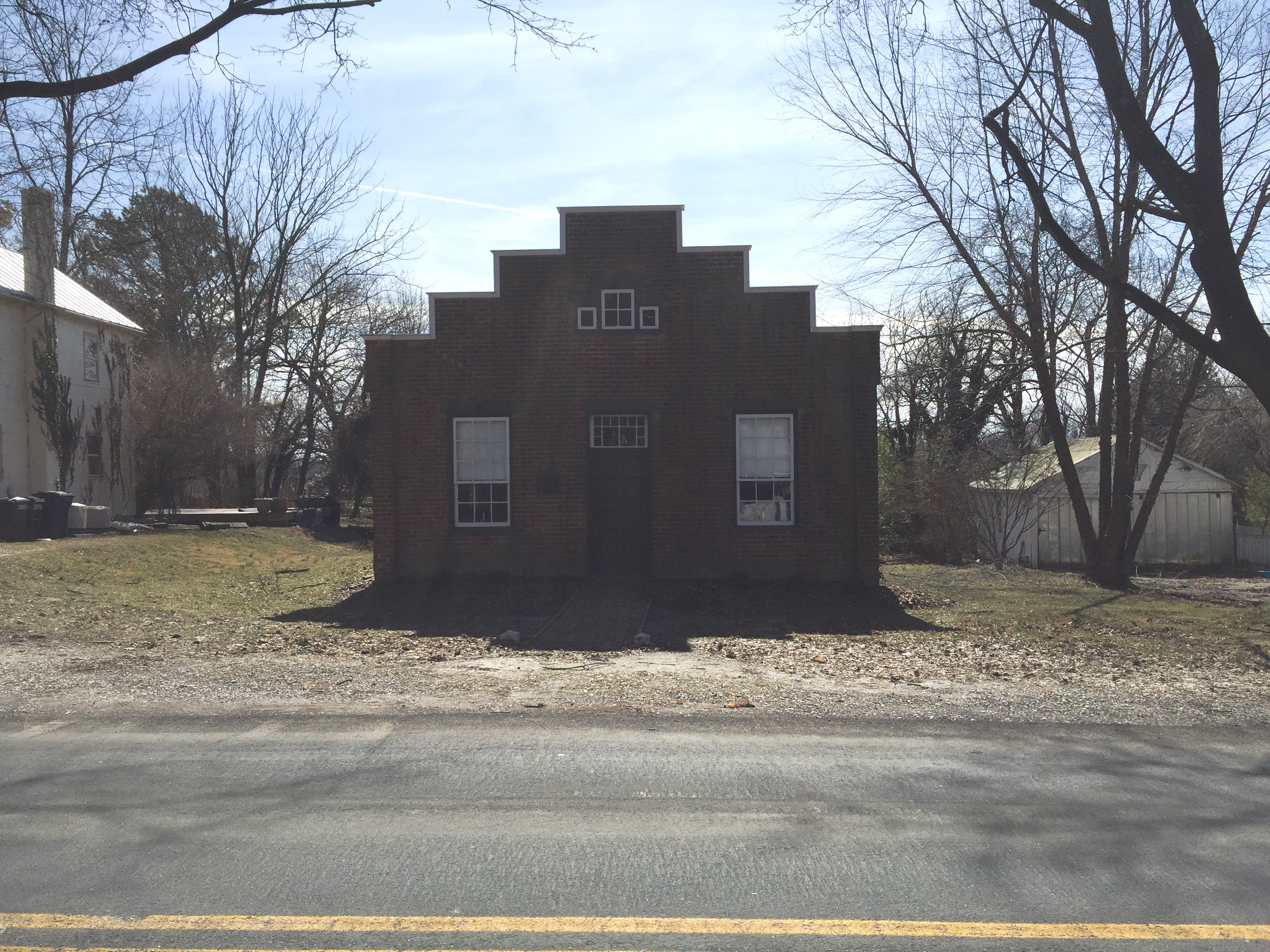

- Location within Maryland Location within the United States
- Location: Uniontown Rd., Uniontown, Maryland
- Coordinates: 39°35′37.32″N 77°6′43.81″W
- Area: 1 acre (0.40 ha)
- Built: 1851
- NRHP reference No.: 73000911
- Added to NRHP: August 14, 1973

Uniontown Academy is a historic school located at Uniontown, Carroll County, Maryland, United States. It is a one-story building of brick with a stone foundation constructed in 1851 and is said to be a replica of the earlier, 1810 structure. It is three bays wide and three bays long, with a gable roof. The front facade features a "false" front effect with its corbeled or stepped setbacks derived from a traditional Dutch style often seen in the false store fronts of western towns. The property retains many of its outbuildings and is operated as an inn and restaurant.

The Uniontown Academy was listed on the National Register of Historic Places in 1973.

After its establishment in 1810, Uniontown Academy was an English-speaking school in a predominantly German community.

The building was donated by Maud Haines, a local resident, to be a community building and museum. Because of this donation, Historic Uniontown, Inc. was created, which received a grant from the Maryland Historical Trust to restore the building.
