= Alesia, Maryland =

Unincorporated community in Maryland, United States

- Unincorporated community
- Location within the state of Maryland Alesia (the United States)
- Coordinates: 39°40′59″N 76°49′44″W
- Country: United States
- State: Maryland
- County: Caroll
- Time zone: UTC−5 (Eastern (EST))
  - Summer (DST): UTC−4 (EDT)

Alesia is an unincorporated community in Carroll County, Maryland, United States. It is located northeast of Manchester and is southwest of Lineboro.

Alesia is located by the old Baltimore and Hanover Railroad near the intersections of: Alesia Rd & Alesia To Lineboro Rd and Alesia Rd & Hoffmanville Rd.
