= Herrington Manor State Park =

State park in Garrett County, Maryland

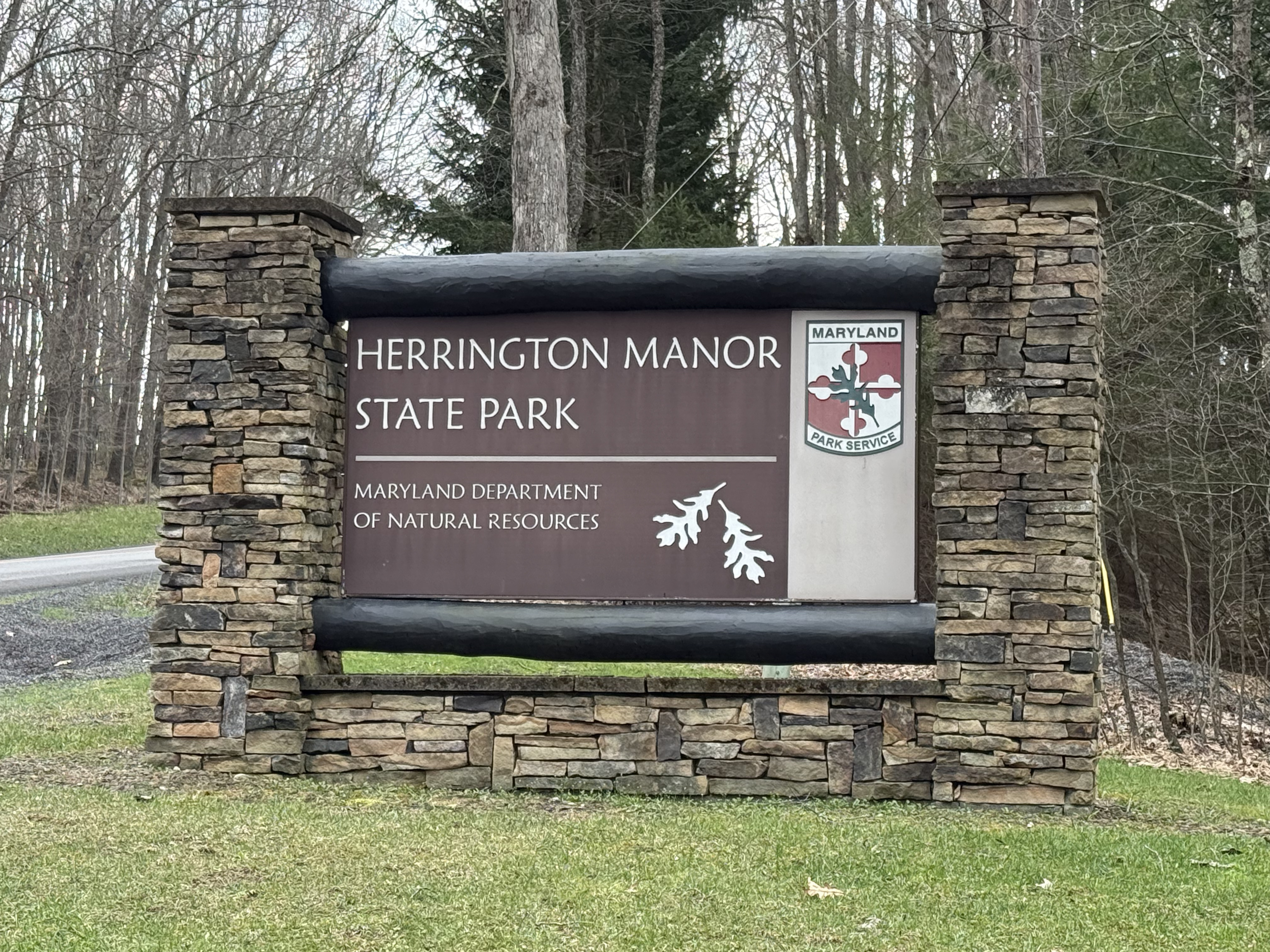
- The park entrance sign in March 2026

- Location within Maryland
- Location: Garrett County, Maryland, United States
- Nearest town: Oakland, Maryland
- Coordinates: 39°27′19″N 79°27′23″W
- Area: 365 acres (148 ha)
- Elevation: 2,375 ft (724 m)
- Established: 1964
- Administrator: Maryland Department of Natural Resources
- Designation: Maryland state park
- Website: Official website

Herrington Manor State Park is a Maryland state park on 365 acres (148 ha) in Garrett County, Maryland. The focal point of the park is 53-acre (21 ha) Herrington Lake. The park lies adjacent to Swallow Falls State Park, approximately four miles (6.4 km) north of Oakland. Both parks are managed by the Maryland Department of Natural Resources.

== History ==
The park is named for the manor house built by real estate investor Abijah Herrington in the mid-1800s. The property was purchased by the state in 1935 as part of state forest development. The Civilian Conservation Corps subsequently dammed Herrington Creek to create the park's 53-acre (21 ha) lake. In 1964, the manor house was demolished and Herrington Manor State Park was established.

== Activities and amenities ==
The park offers swimming, fishing, boating, twelve miles of hiking and biking trails, and rental cabins.
