= Eden Mill Nature Center =

Nature center in United States

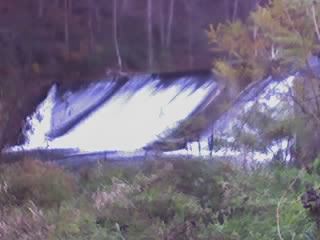
- Eden Mill Waterfall in 2010
- Interactive map of Eden Mill Nature Center
- Type: nature center
- Location: 1617 Eden Mill Road; Pylesville, Maryland
- Coordinates: 39°40′3″N 76°27′25″W
- Area: 118 acres (480,000 m^{2})
- Created: 1991
- Operator: Harford County, Maryland
- Hiking trails: 5 miles
- Website: edenmill.org

Eden Mill Nature Center is a nature center in Pylesville, Maryland, United States.

== History ==
The center was a gristmill in the 1800s. The name comes from Father Eden.

In 1917, it was made into a power plant by remodeling the dam, and it continued to function as a mill until 1964. In 1991, Harford County purchased the center with the purpose of converting it into a park.
