= National Museum of Civil War Medicine =

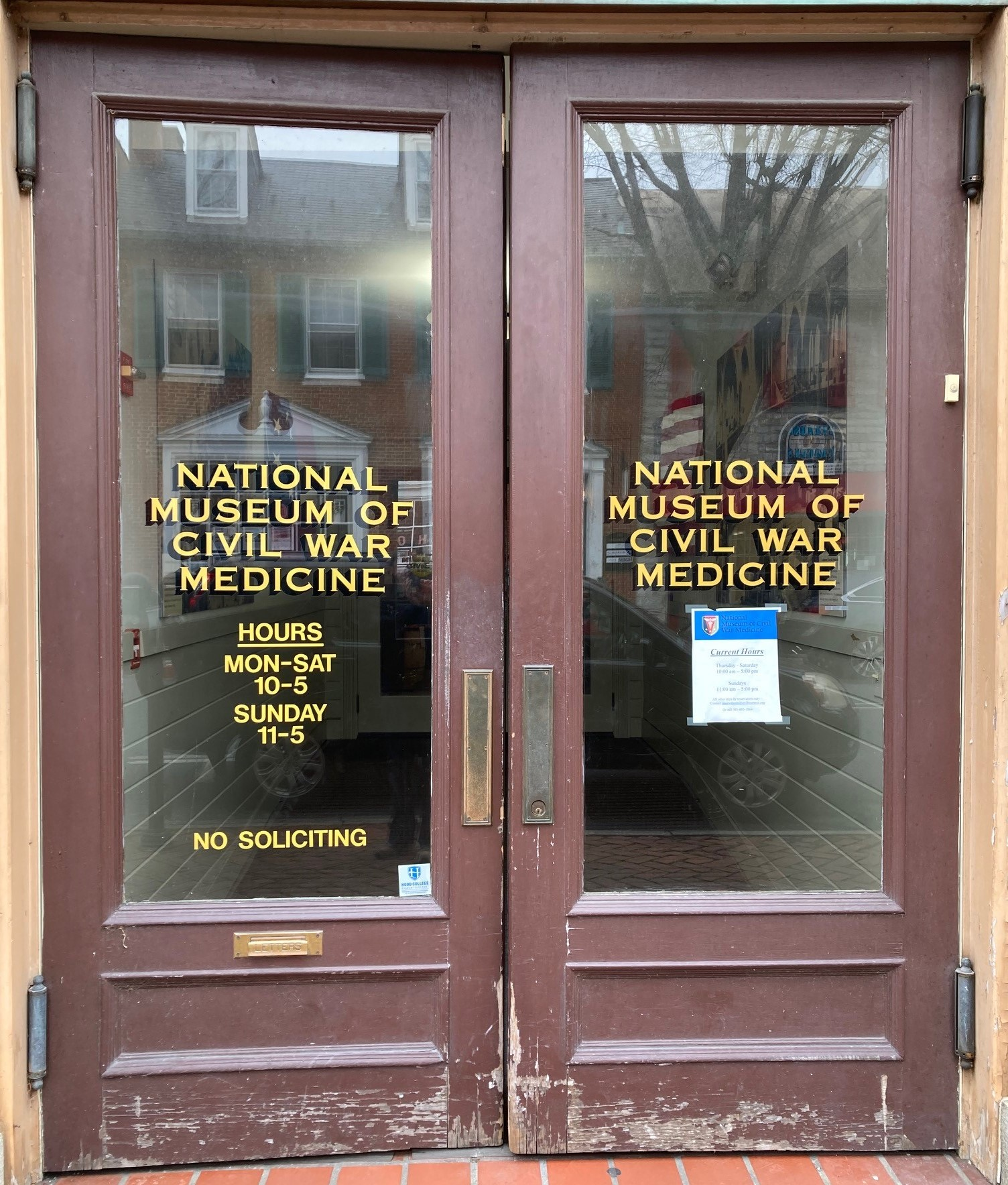
- Front doors of the museum
- Established: 1990
- Location: 48 East Patrick Street; Frederick, Maryland
- Coordinates: 39.413889°N 77.409306°W
- Type: History museum
- Website: Official Website

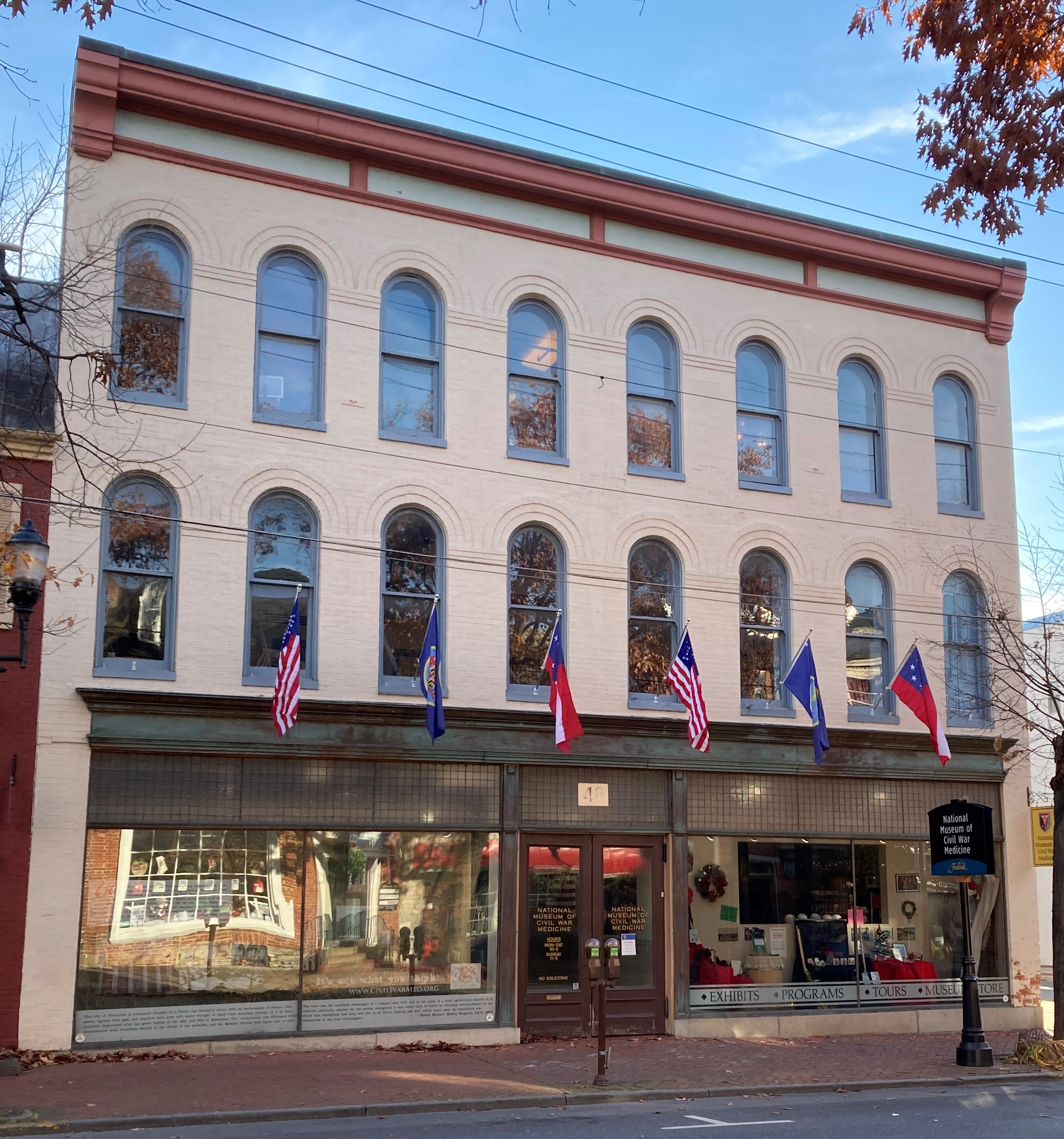
Museum building

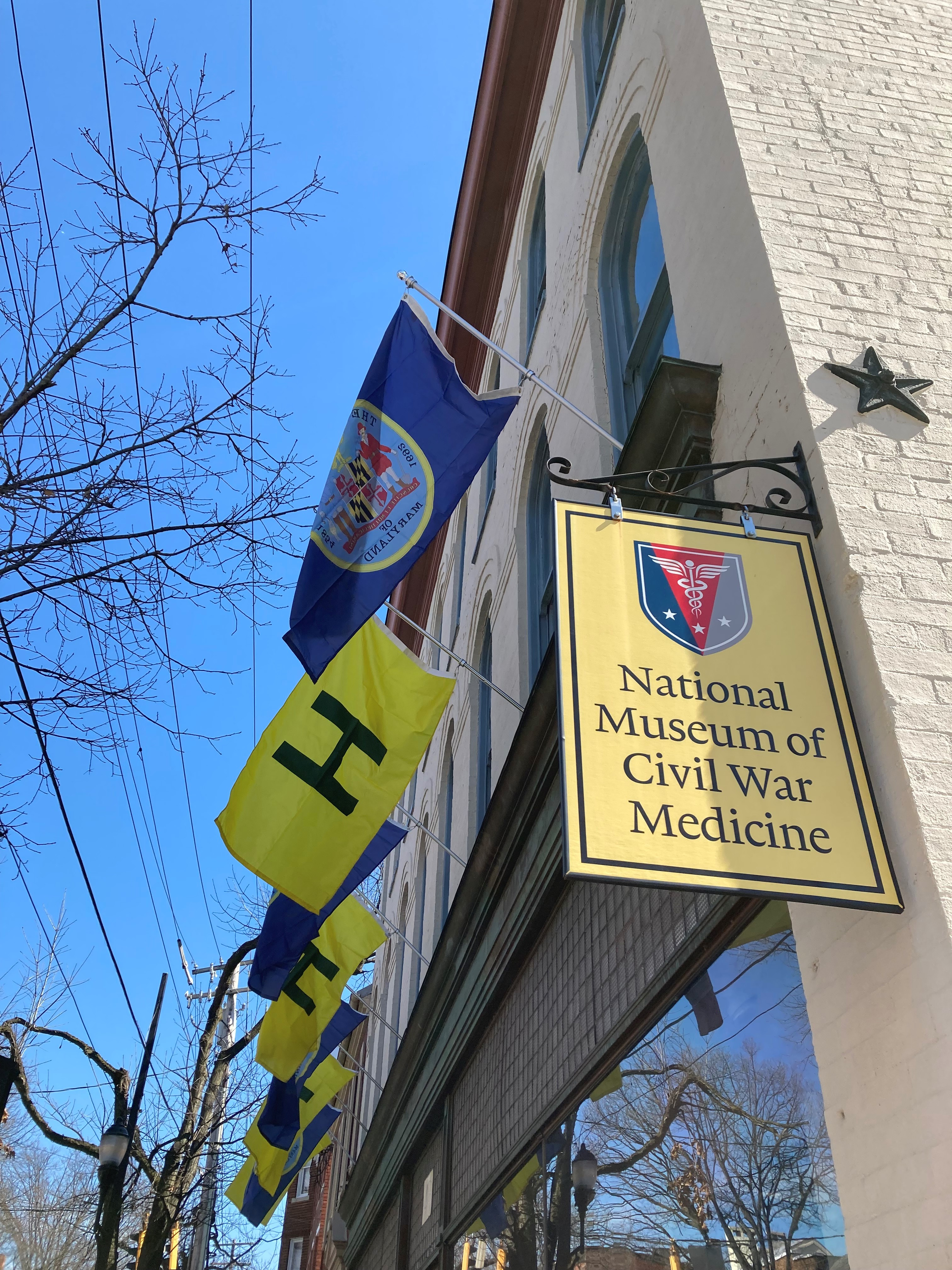
Sign in front of the museum

The National Museum of Civil War Medicine is a U.S. historic education institution located in Frederick, Maryland. Its focus involves the medical, surgical and nursing practices during the American Civil War (1861–1865).

== History ==
The museum, which was originally proposed by Dr. Gordon E. Damman, a private collector of Civil War-era medical artifacts, was incorporated in 1990 and first opened to the public in 1996. The museum moved into its current location – a three-story 19th century brick building that was home to a furniture maker/undertaker operation during the Civil War – in October 2000.

== Focus ==
The 7,000-square-foot (650 m^{2}) museum consists of five immersion exhibits that recreate aspects of Civil War medical issues: life in an army camp, evacuation of the wounded from the battlefront, a field dressing station, a field hospital and a military hospital ward. The exhibits incorporate surviving tools and equipment from the war, including the only known surviving Civil War surgeon’s tent, surgical kits, and items pertaining to veterinary medicine.

In 2006, the museum published its first book with the release of Robert G. Slawson’s Prologue to Change: African Americans in Medicine in the Civil War Era. The museum has organized an annual national conference on Civil War-era medicine since 1993.

In 2006, the museum, in cooperation with the U.S. National Park Service, began operating the Pry House Field Hospital Museum at the Antietam National Battlefield. In 2014, the museum opened the Clara Barton Missing Soldiers Office at 347 Seventh Street, NW in Washington, D.C.
