= Oregon Ridge Park =

Park in Cockeysville, Maryland, US

Oregon Ridge
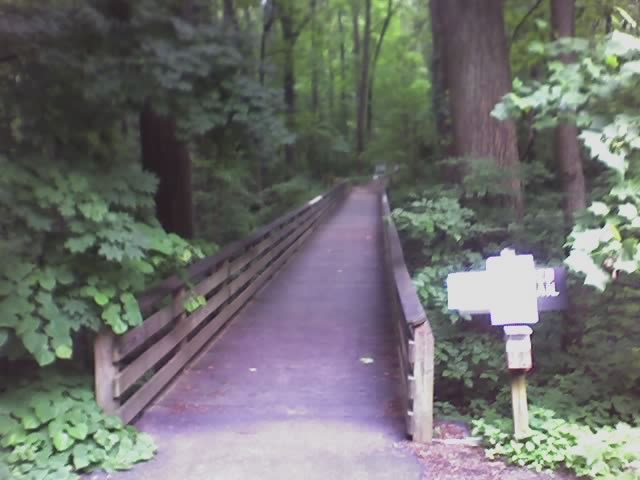
- The walking bridge at the entrance to the trails at Oregon Ridge
- Interactive map of Oregon Ridge
- Type: County
- Location: Cockeysville, Maryland
- Coordinates: 39°29′11″N 76°41′31″W
- Area: 1,043-acre (4.22 km^{2})
- Operator: Baltimore County
- Status: Official website

Oregon Ridge Park is a 1,043-acre (4.22 km^{2}) park in Cockeysville, Maryland. This park is run by the Baltimore County Recreation and Parks department. The park has two entrances, one for the Lodge side, and the other for the Oregon Ridge Nature Center.

The park features walking and hiking trails, the Oregon Ridge Nature Center with live animals, picnic and recreation areas, a lodge, and cross-country skiing and sledding.

The Nature Center side of the park is the location of an annual Honey Harvest Festival, maple sugaring weekends, summer camps and weekly programming for families in the Baltimore County are. The Lodge side hosts a Fourth of July celebration, which includes a concert by the Baltimore Symphony Orchestra

== History ==
The site for the park was originally owned by John Merryman during the 1800s.

The park was built on the site of some abandoned goethite (iron ore) and marble quarries dating back to the 1830s. A structure, the Goff Tenant House, and several other ruins of the mining village remain. One of the quarries has long since filled with water. It was then used for many years for swimming, with an added sand beach. Currently this area is only used for Baltimore County programming like canoeing and cane pole fishing. Swimming and fishing is prohibited.

The park was previously used for downhill skiing in the 1960s, but warmer temperatures in the region and the cost of artificially producing snow made this usage impractical. Remnants of the lifts are still present, and the main slope is used as a seating area for outdoor concerts.

In 1990, Baltimore County acquired the Merryman Tract, which includes the valley of the Baisman Run, expanding to the south of the original park area.

== Gallery ==
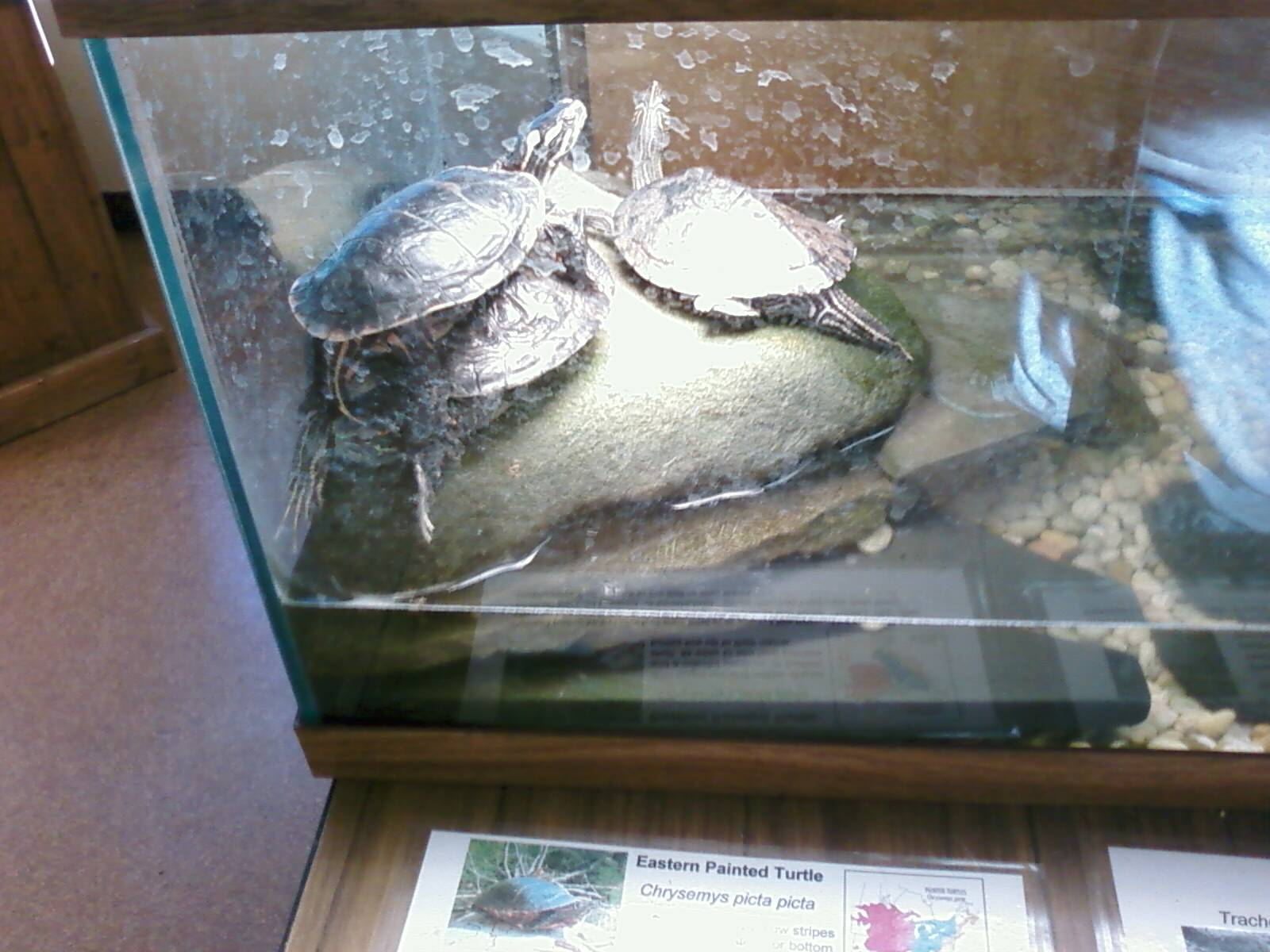
Turtles at Oregon Ridge Nature Center

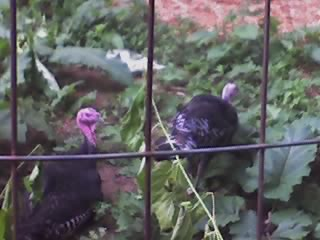
Outdoor animal exhibit

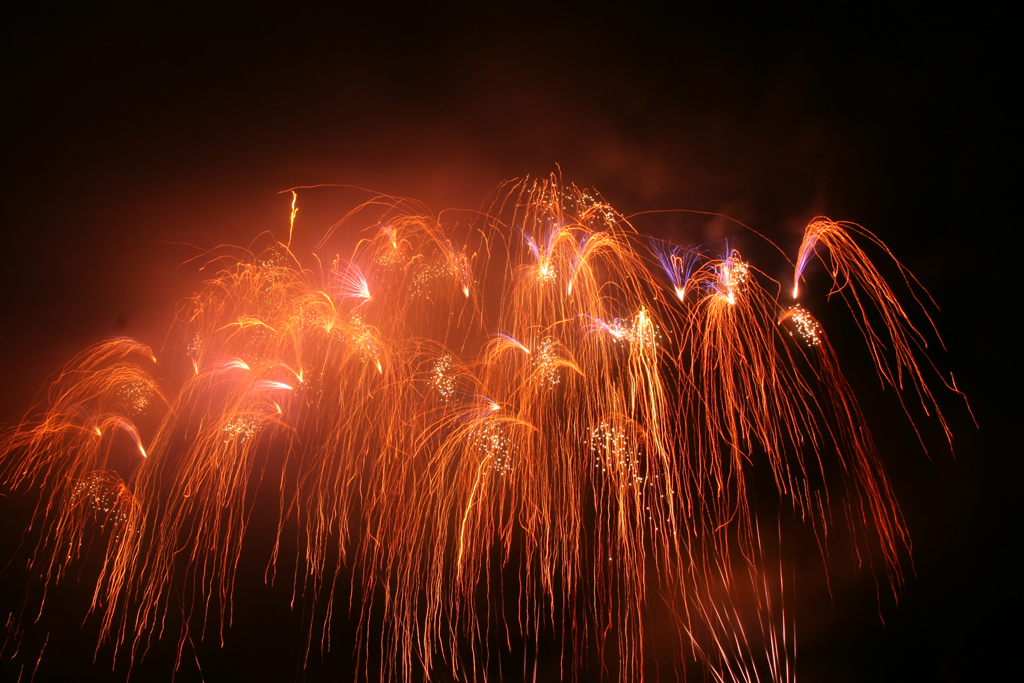
Fireworks on 4 July

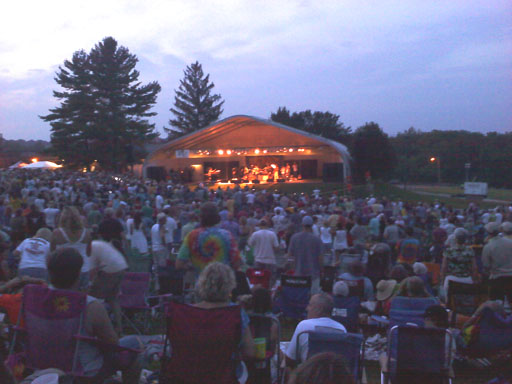
The main stage
