= Brick Hill (Baltimore, Maryland) =

- U.S. National Register of Historic Places
- U.S. Historic district
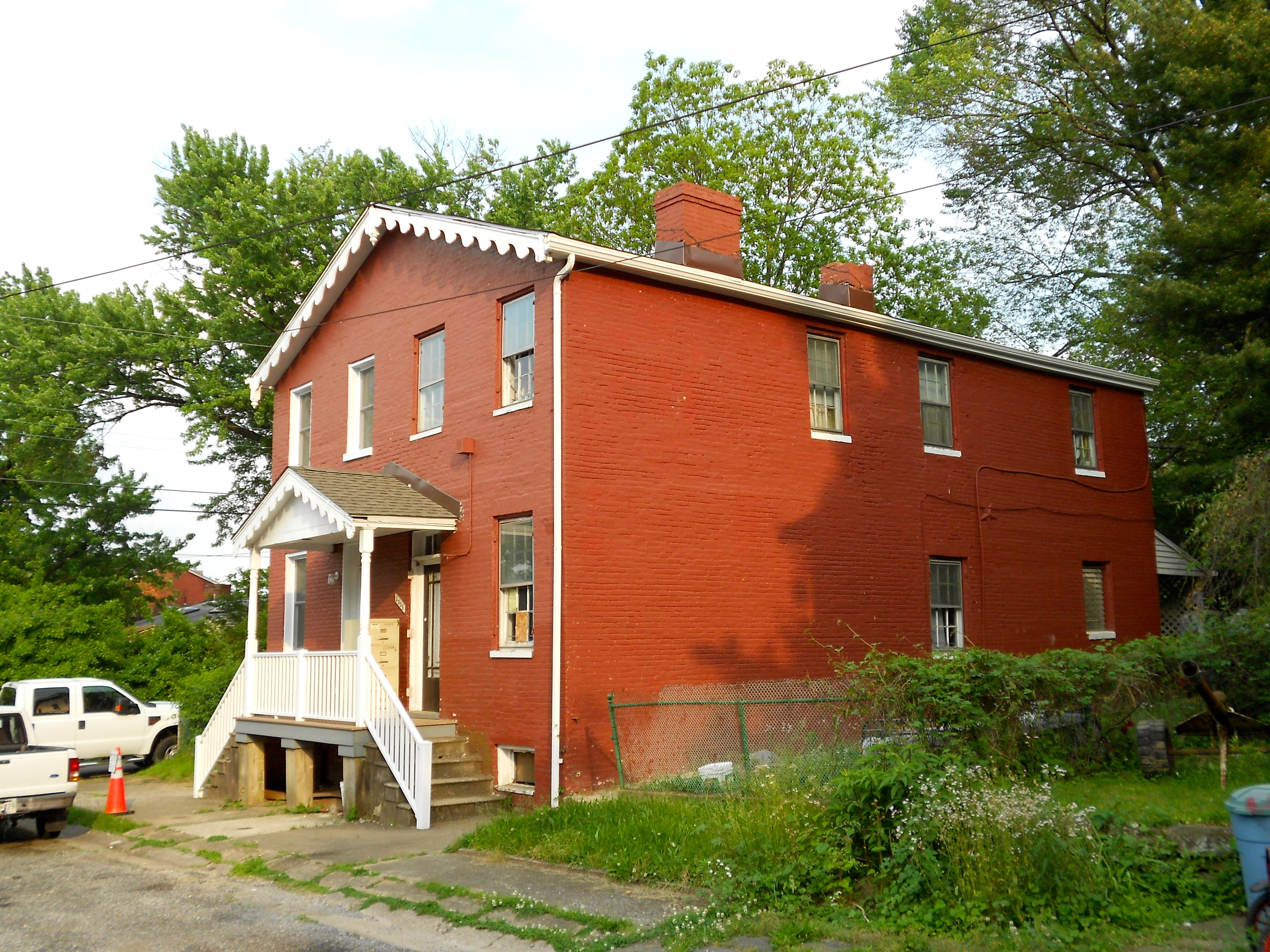

- Location within Baltimore Location within Maryland Location within the United States
- Location: Seneca St., Oakington St., Parkden Ave., Baltimore, Maryland
- Coordinates: 39°19′49″N 76°38′38″W
- Area: 4 acres (1.6 ha)
- Built: 1877
- Architectural style: Mid 19th Century Revival
- NRHP reference No.: 88000743
- Added to NRHP: July 1, 1988

Brick Hill is a national historic district located in Baltimore, Maryland, United States. The district consists of a small, historically isolated enclave of 2- and 2 1/2-story masonry duplexes built around 1877 to house workers employed at the nearby Meadow Mill of the Woodberry Manufacturing Company.

Of the eleven duplexes, ten are constructed of brick, which gave the four-acre enclave its traditional name. One dwelling is built of stone, and two small two-story frame houses are also included within the district boundaries.

Brick Hill was listed on the National Register of Historic Places in 1988.
