= Popes Creek, Maryland =

Unincorporated community in Maryland, United States

- Unincorporated community
- Location within the state of Maryland Popes Creek (the United States)
- Coordinates: 38°23′56″N 76°59′28″W
- Country: United States
- State: Maryland
- County: Charles
- Time zone: UTC-5 (Eastern (EST))
  - Summer (DST): UTC-4 (EDT)
- GNIS feature ID: 586651

Popes Creek is an unincorporated community in Charles County, Maryland, United States. It is located on the shore of a north–south section of the Potomac River, north of and in sight of the Harry Nice Memorial Bridge. There are docks and two seafood restaurants. U.S. Route 301 in Maryland runs north from the bridge, somewhat isolating the area between the river and the highway. To the north is Port Tobacco and to the southeast, the Cobb Island peninsula.

Popes Creek is home to the Loyola Roman Catholic retreat center. Near here, John Wilkes Booth was rowed across the river, a week after he assassinated President Abraham Lincoln. Popes Creek (Virginia) is on the Virginia shore, approximately 15 miles (24 km) southeast.
