= Index of Maryland-related articles =

The location of the state of Maryland in the United States of America

The following is an alphabetical list of articles related to the U.S. state of Maryland.

== 0–9 ==
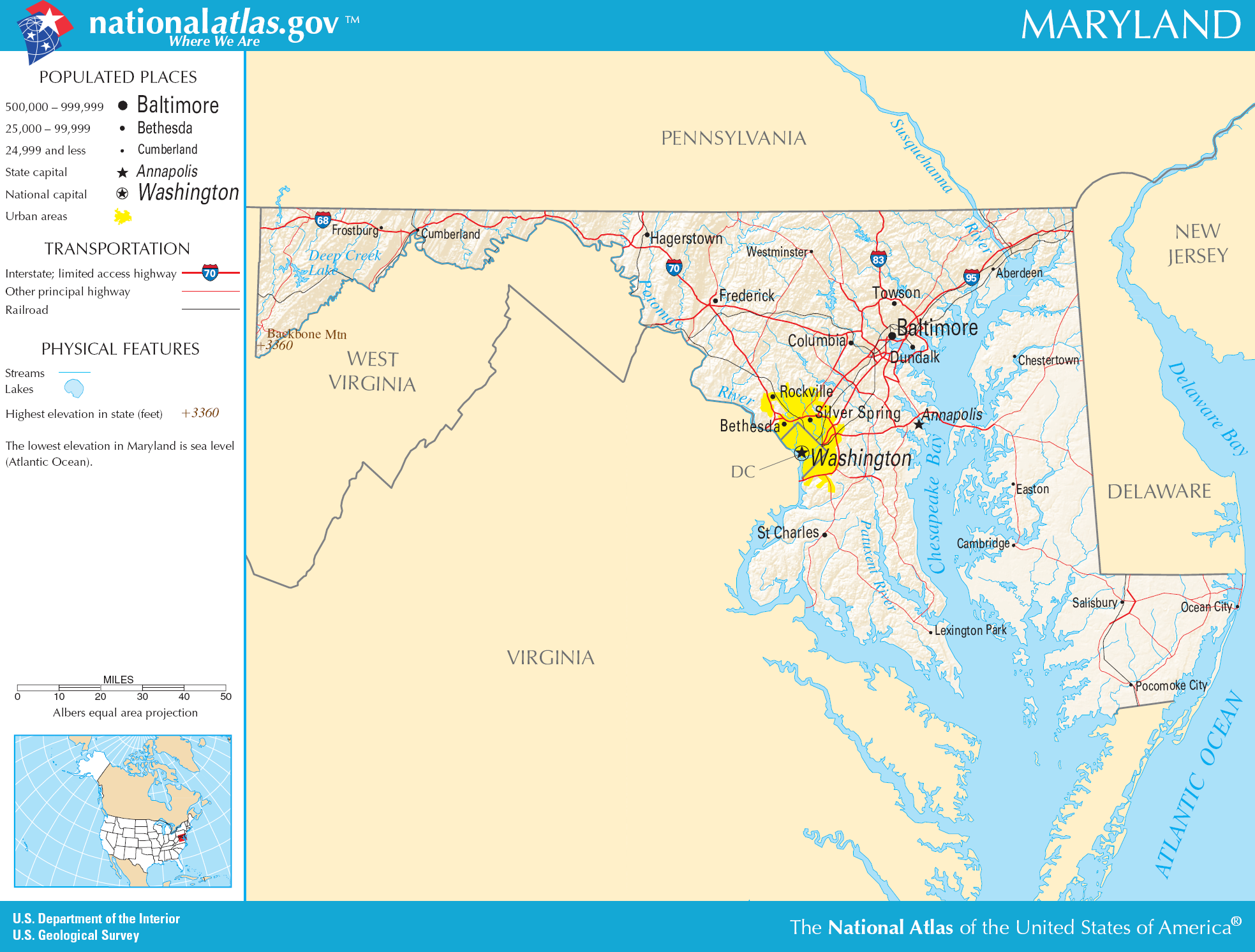
An enlargeable map of the state of Maryland

- .md.us – Internet second-level domain for the state of Maryland

== A ==
- Adjacent states and federal district:
  - Commonwealth of Pennsylvania
  - Commonwealth of Virginia
  - District of Columbia
  - State of Delaware
  - State of West Virginia
- Agriculture in Maryland
- Airports in Maryland
- American Civil War in Maryland
  - Confederate Regiments from Maryland
  - Union Regiments from Maryland
- Amusement parks in Maryland
- Annapolis, Maryland, colonial and state capital since 1694
- Annotated Code of Maryland
- Aquaria in Maryland
  - commons:Category:Aquaria in Maryland
- Arboreta in Maryland
  - commons:Category:Arboreta in Maryland
- Archaeology of Maryland
  - Category:Archaeological sites in Maryland
    - commons:Category:Archaeological sites in Maryland
- Architecture of Maryland
- Art museums and galleries in Maryland
  - commons:Category:Art museums and galleries in Maryland
- List of artwork in the Maryland State House
- Astronomical observatories in Maryland
  - commons:Category:Astronomical observatories in Maryland
- Attorney General of the State of Maryland

== B ==
- Baltimore, Maryland
- Botanical gardens in Maryland
  - commons:Category:Botanical gardens in Maryland
- Buildings and structures in Maryland
  - commons:Category:Buildings and structures in Maryland

== C ==
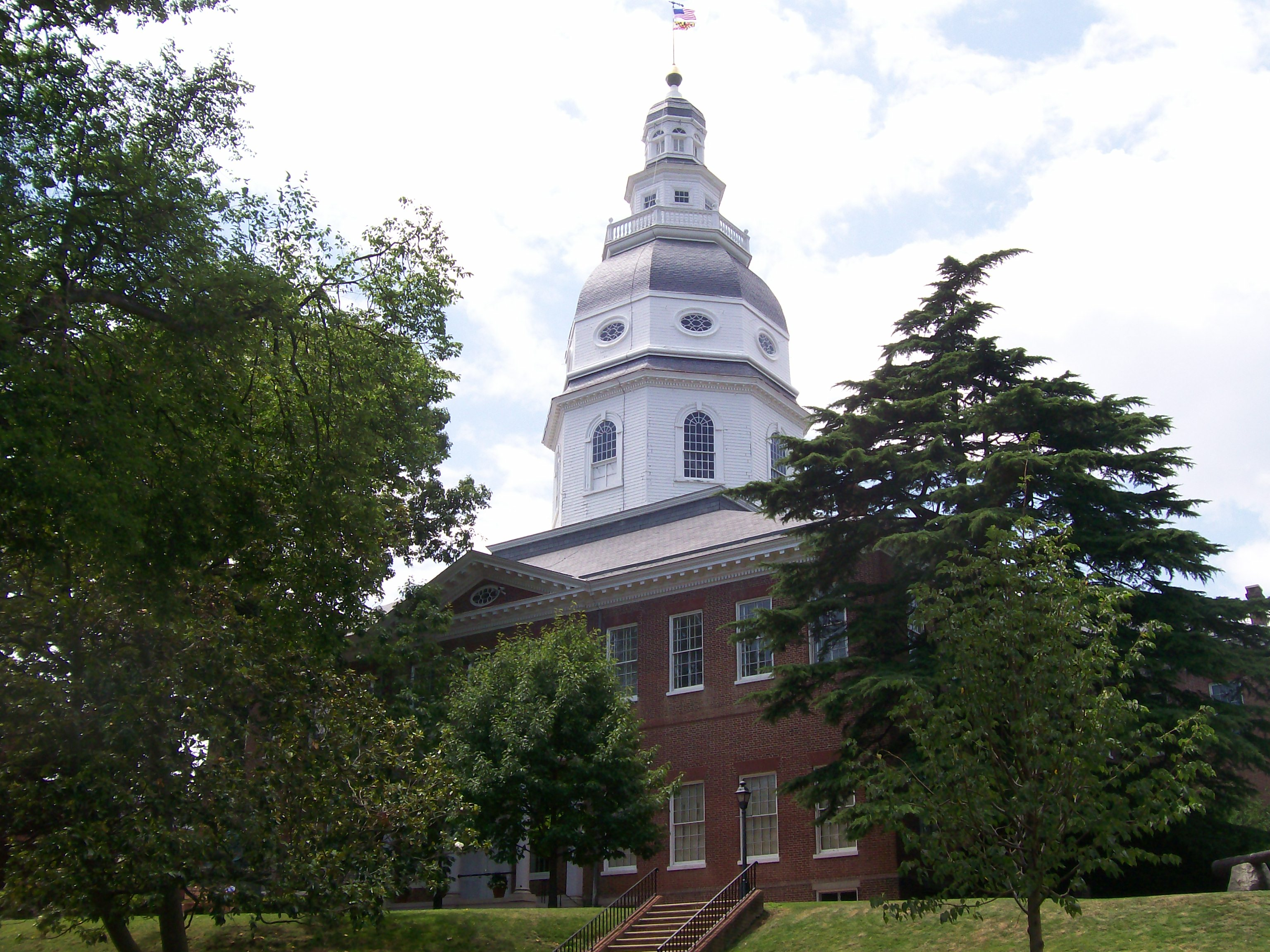
The Maryland State House in Annapolis

- Cannabis in Maryland
- Canyons and gorges of Maryland
  - commons:Category:Canyons and gorges of Maryland
- Capital of the State of Maryland
- Capitol of the State of Maryland
  - commons:Category:Maryland State Capitol
- Caves of Maryland
  - commons:Category:Caves of Maryland
- Census statistical areas of Maryland
- Chesapeake Bay
- Cities in Maryland
  - commons:Category:Cities in Maryland
- Climate of Maryland
- Climate change in Maryland
- Colleges and universities in Maryland
  - commons:Category:Universities and colleges in Maryland
- Colony of Maryland, 1632–1694
- Communications in Maryland
  - commons:Category:Communications in Maryland

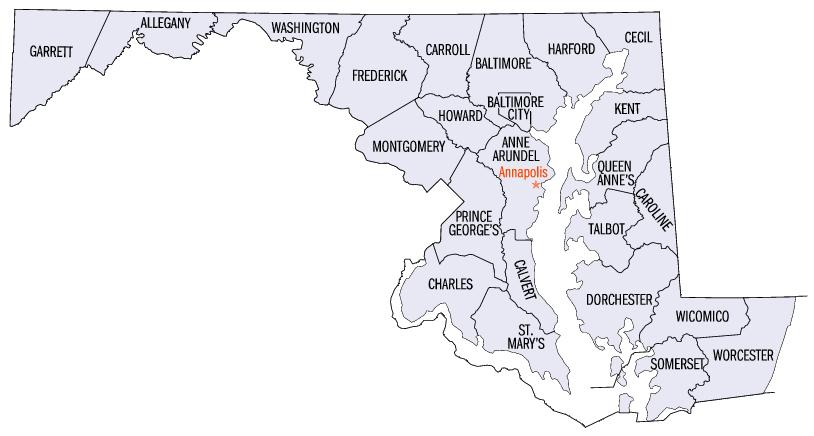
An enlargeable map of the 23 counties and 1 independent city of the State of Maryland

- Companies in Maryland
- Constitution of the State of Maryland
- Convention centers in Maryland
  - commons:Category:Convention centers in Maryland
- Counties of the State of Maryland
  - commons:Category:Counties in Maryland
- Culture of Maryland
  - commons:Category:Maryland cuisine

== D ==
- Demographics of Maryland
  - Category:Demographics of Maryland

== E ==
- Economy of Maryland
  - Category:Economy of Maryland
    - commons:Category:Economy of Maryland
- Education in Maryland
  - Category:Education in Maryland
    - commons:Category:Education in Maryland
- Category:Elections in Maryland
  - commons:Category:Elections in Maryland
- Category:Environment of Maryland
  - commons:Category:Environment of Maryland
- Ethnic groups in Baltimore, Maryland

== F ==
The flag of the state of Maryland

- Festivals in Maryland
  - commons:Category:Festivals in Maryland
- Flag of the state of Maryland
- Former state highway routes in Maryland
- Forts in Maryland
  - Fort McHenry
  - Category:Forts in Maryland
    - commons:Category:Forts in Maryland

== G ==
The obverse of the Great Seal of the State of Maryland

- Geography of Maryland
  - Category:Geography of Maryland
    - commons:Category:Geography of Maryland
- Geology of Maryland
  - commons:Category:Geology of Maryland
- Ghost towns in Maryland
  - Category:Ghost towns in Maryland
    - commons:Category:Ghost towns in Maryland
- Golf clubs and courses in Maryland
- Government of the state of Maryland website
  - Category:Government of Maryland
    - commons:Category:Government of Maryland
- Governor of the State of Maryland
  - List of governors of Maryland
- Great Seal of the State of Maryland

== H ==
- Heritage railroads in Maryland
  - commons:Category:Heritage railroads in Maryland
- High schools of Maryland
- Higher education in Maryland
- Hiking trails in Maryland
  - commons:Category:Hiking trails in Maryland
- History of Maryland
  - Indigenous peoples
  - Colony of Maryland, 1632–1694
    - History of slavery in Maryland
  - Province of Maryland, 1694–1776
  - French and Indian War, 1754–1763
    - Treaty of Paris of 1763
  - British Indian Reserve, 1763–1783
    - Royal Proclamation of 1763
  - American Revolutionary War, 1775–1783
    - United States Declaration of Independence of 1776
    - Treaty of Paris of 1783
  - State of Maryland, since 1776
    - War of 1812, 1812–1815
      - Battle of Baltimore, 1814
    - Maryland in the American Civil War, 1861–1865
      - Border state, 1861–1865
  - Category:History of Maryland
    - commons:Category:History of Maryland
- Hospitals in Maryland

== I ==
- Images of Maryland
  - commons:Category:Maryland
- Interstate highway routes in Maryland
- Islands of Maryland

== L ==
- Lakes of Maryland
  - commons:Category:Lakes of Maryland
- Landmarks in Maryland
  - commons:Category:Landmarks in Maryland
- Lieutenant Governor of the State of Maryland
- Lists related to the state of Maryland:
  - List of airports in Maryland
  - List of census-designated places in Maryland
  - List of census statistical areas in Maryland
  - List of cities in Maryland
  - List of Civil War Confederate Regiments from Maryland
  - List of Civil War Union Regiments from Maryland
  - List of colleges and universities in Maryland
  - List of counties in Maryland
  - List of former state highway routes in Maryland
  - List of forts in Maryland
  - List of freshwater fishes of Maryland
  - List of ghost towns in Maryland
  - List of governors of Maryland
  - List of high schools in Maryland
  - List of hospitals in Maryland
  - List of individuals executed in Maryland
  - List of Interstate highway routes in Maryland
  - List of islands of Maryland
  - List of law enforcement agencies in Maryland
  - List of minor state highways in Maryland
  - List of museums in Maryland
  - List of National Historic Landmarks in Maryland
  - List of National Park System areas in Maryland
  - List of newspapers in Maryland
  - List of parks in the Baltimore–Washington metropolitan area
  - List of people from Maryland
  - List of professional sports teams in Maryland
  - List of radio stations in Maryland
  - List of railroads in Maryland
  - List of Registered Historic Places in Maryland
  - List of rivers of Maryland
  - List of school districts in Maryland
  - List of sister cities in Maryland
  - List of state forests in Maryland
  - List of state highway routes in Maryland
  - List of state parks in Maryland
  - List of state prisons in Maryland
  - List of symbols of the State of Maryland
  - List of television stations in Maryland
    - List of television stations in Maryland by channel number
  - List of towns in Maryland
  - List of Maryland's congressional delegations
  - List of United States congressional districts in Maryland
  - List of United States representatives from Maryland
  - List of United States senators from Maryland
  - List of U.S. highway routes in Maryland

== M ==
- Maps of Maryland
  - commons:Category:Maps of Maryland
- Maryland website
  - Category:Maryland
    - commons:Category:Maryland
- Maryland 529
- Maryland Academy of Technology and Health Sciences
- Maryland Association of CPAs
- Maryland BayStat
- Maryland Blue Crab Young Reader Award
- Maryland Department of General Services Police
- Maryland Free Press
- Maryland National Guard Outstanding Soldier/Airman of the Year Ribbon
- Maryland power plant research program
- Maryland Sister States Program
- Maryland State Highway Administration
- Maryland State House
- Maryland State Police
- Maryland Transportation Authority
- Mass media in Maryland
- MD – United States Postal Service postal code for the State of Maryland
- Monuments and memorials in Maryland
  - commons:Category:Monuments and memorials in Maryland
- Motor Vehicle Administration
- Mountains of Maryland
  - commons:Category:Mountains of Maryland
- Museums in Maryland
  - Category:Museums in Maryland
    - commons:Category:Museums in Maryland
- Music of Maryland
  - commons:Category:Music of Maryland
  - Category:Musical groups from Maryland
  - Category:Musicians from Maryland

== N ==
- National Park System areas in Maryland
- Natural history of Maryland
  - commons:Category:Natural history of Maryland
- List of newspapers in Maryland & Newspapers of Maryland

== O ==
- Outdoor sculptures in Maryland
  - commons:Category:Outdoor sculptures in Maryland

== P ==
- Parks in the Baltimore-Washington metropolitan area
- People from Maryland
  - Category:People from Maryland
    - commons:Category:People from Maryland
    - Category:People from Maryland by populated place
    - Category:People from Maryland by county
    - Category:People from Maryland by occupation
- Philadelphia-Camden-Vineland, PA-NJ-DE-MD Combined Statistical Area
- Philadelphia-Camden-Wilmington, PA-NJ-DE-MD Metropolitan Statistical Area
- Pimlico Race Course
- Politics of Maryland
- Potomac River
- Preakness Stakes
- Professional sports teams in Maryland
- Protected areas of Maryland
  - commons:Category:Protected areas of Maryland
- Province of Maryland, 1894-1776

== R ==
- Radio stations in Maryland
- Railroad museums in Maryland
  - commons:Category:Railroad museums in Maryland
- Railroads in Maryland
- Registered historic places in Maryland
  - commons:Category:Registered Historic Places in Maryland
- Religion in Maryland
  - Category:Religion in Maryland
    - commons:Category:Religion in Maryland
- Rivers of Maryland
  - commons:Category:Rivers of Maryland

== S ==
- St. Mary's City, Maryland, colonial capital 1634-1694
- School districts of Maryland
- Scouting in Maryland
- Senate of the State of Maryland
- Settlements in Maryland
  - Cities in Maryland
  - Towns in Maryland
  - Villages in Maryland
  - Census Designated Places in Maryland
  - Other unincorporated communities in Maryland
  - List of ghost towns in Maryland
- Sister cities in Maryland
- Sports in Maryland
  - Category:Sports in Maryland
    - commons:Category:Sports in Maryland
  - Category:Sports venues in Maryland
    - commons:Category:Sports venues in Maryland
- State highway routes in Maryland
- State of Maryland website
  - Constitution of the State of Maryland
  - Government of the State of Maryland
    - Category:Government of Maryland
      - commons:Category:Government of Maryland
  - Executive branch of the government of the State of Maryland
    - Governor of the State of Maryland
  - Legislative branch of the government of the State of Maryland
    - General Assembly of the State of Maryland
      - Senate of the State of Maryland
      - House of Delegates of the State of Maryland
  - Judicial branch of the government of the State of Maryland
    - Supreme Court of the State of Maryland
- State parks of Maryland
  - commons:Category:State parks of Maryland
- State Police of Maryland
- State prisons of Maryland
- Structures in Maryland
  - commons:Category:Buildings and structures in Maryland
- Supreme Court of the State of Maryland
- Susquehanna River
- Symbols of the State of Maryland
  - Category:Symbols of Maryland
    - commons:Category:Symbols of Maryland

== T ==
- Telecommunications in Maryland
  - commons:Category:Communications in Maryland
- Telephone area codes in Maryland
- Television shows set in Maryland
- Television stations in Maryland
  - List of Television stations in Maryland by channel number
- Theatres in Maryland
  - commons:Category:Theatres in Maryland
- Tourism in Maryland website
  - commons:Category:Tourism in Maryland
- Towns in Maryland
  - commons:Category:Cities in Maryland
- Transportation in Maryland
  - Category:Transportation in Maryland
    - commons:Category:Transport in Maryland
- Treasurer of the State of Maryland
- Triple Crown of Thoroughbred Racing

== U ==
- United States of America
  - States of the United States of America
  - United States census statistical areas of Maryland
  - Maryland's congressional delegations
  - United States congressional districts in Maryland
  - United States Court of Appeals for the Fourth Circuit
  - United States District Court for the District of Maryland
  - United States representatives from Maryland
  - United States senators from Maryland
- Universities and colleges in Maryland
  - commons:Category:Universities and colleges in Maryland
  - University System of Maryland
- U.S. highway routes in Maryland
- US-MD – ISO 3166-2:US region code for the State of Maryland

== V ==
- Tourist attractions in Maryland

== W ==
- Washington-Arlington-Alexandria, DC-VA-MD-WV Metropolitan Statistical Area
- Washington-Baltimore-Northern Virginia, DC-MD-VA-WV Combined Statistical Area
- Water parks in Maryland
- Waterfalls of Maryland
  - commons:Category:Waterfalls of Maryland
  Wikimedia
  - Wikimedia Commons:Category:Maryland
    - commons:Category:Maps of Maryland
  - Wikinews:Category:Maryland
    - Wikinews:Portal:Maryland
  - Wikipedia Category:Maryland
    - Wikipedia Portal:Maryland
    - Wikipedia:WikiProject Maryland
      - Category:WikiProject Maryland articles
      - Category:WikiProject Maryland participants

== Z ==
- Zoos in Maryland
  - commons:Category:Zoos in Maryland

== See also ==
- Topic overview:
  - Maryland
  - Outline of Maryland
