= Outline of Maryland =

Overview of and topical guide to Maryland

The flag of Maryland

The seal of Maryland

The location of the state of Maryland in the United States of America

The following outline is provided as an overview of and topical guide to the U.S. state of Maryland:

Maryland – U.S. state located in the Mid-Atlantic region of the United States, bordering Virginia, West Virginia, and the District of Columbia to its south and west; Pennsylvania to its north; and Delaware to its east. Maryland was the seventh state to ratify the United States Constitution, and three nicknames for it (the Old Line State, the Free State, and the Chesapeake Bay State) are occasionally used. The state's most populated city is Baltimore. Its capital is Annapolis.

== General reference ==
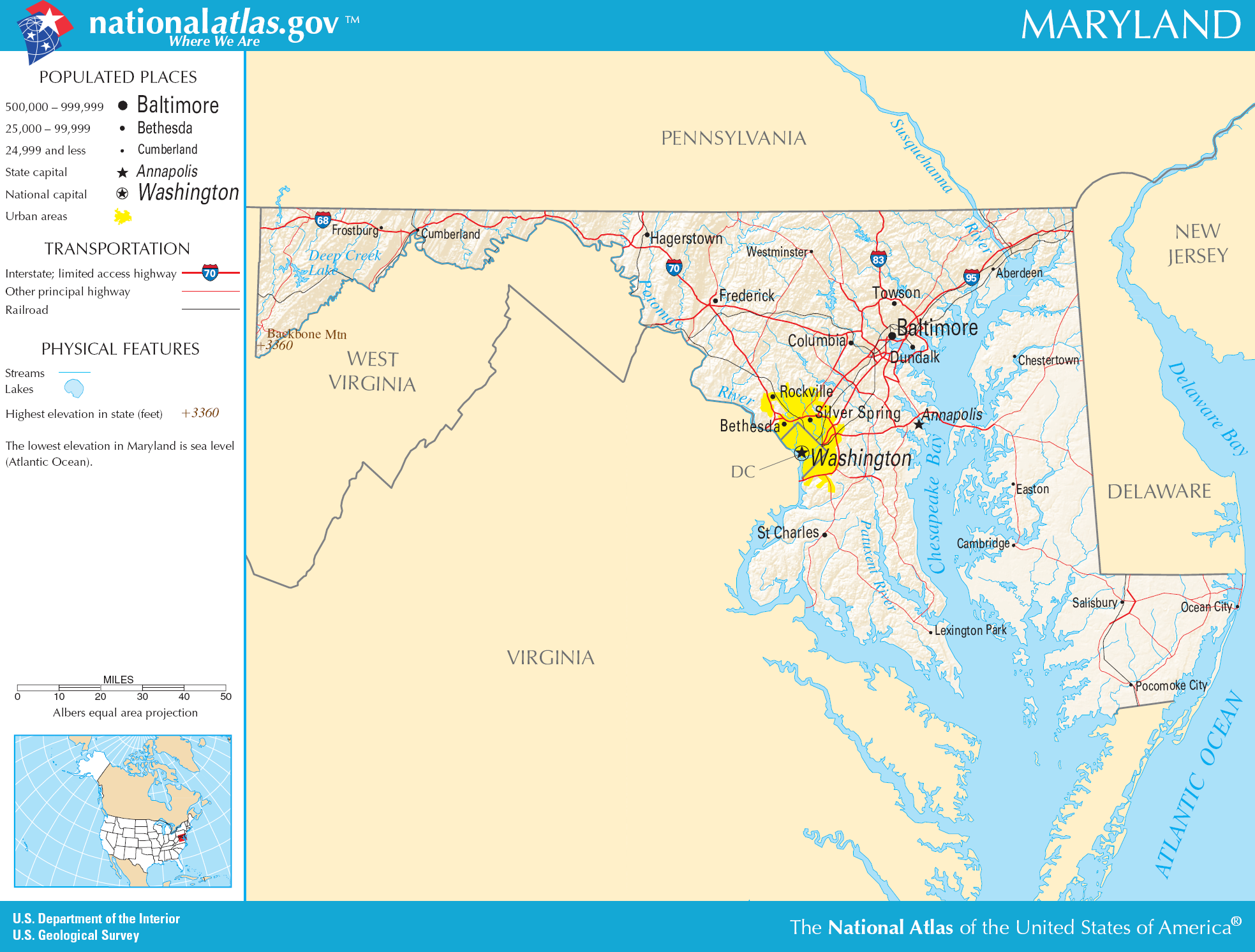
An enlargeable map of the state of Maryland

- Names
  - Common name: Maryland
    - Pronunciation: /ˈmɛrələnd/
  - Official name: State of Maryland
  - Abbreviations and name codes
    - Postal symbol: MD
    - ISO 3166-2 code: US-MD
    - Internet second-level domain: .md.us
  - Nicknames
    - America in Miniature
    - Chesapeake State
    - Cockade State
    - Crab State
    - Free State
    - Monumental State
    - Old Line State
    - Oyster State
    - Queen State
    - Terrapin State
- Adjectival: Maryland
- Demonym: Marylander

== Geography of Maryland ==
Geography of Maryland

- Maryland is: a U.S. state, a federal state of the United States of America
- Location
  - Northern Hemisphere
  - Western Hemisphere
    - Americas
      - North America
        - Anglo America
        - Northern America
          - United States of America
            - Contiguous United States
              - Eastern United States
                - East Coast of the United States
                - Mid-Atlantic states
                - South Atlantic States
              - Southern United States
                - South Atlantic States
- Population of Maryland: 5,773,552 (2010 U.S. Census)
- Area of Maryland: 12,407 sq mi (32,133 km^{2})
- Atlas of Maryland

=== Places in Maryland ===
- Historic places in Maryland
  - Ghost towns in Maryland
  - National Historic Landmarks in Maryland
  - National Register of Historic Places listings in Maryland
    - Bridges on the National Register of Historic Places in Maryland
- National Natural Landmarks in Maryland
- National parks in Maryland
- State parks in Maryland

=== Environment of Maryland ===
- Climate of Maryland
- Geology of Maryland
- Protected areas of Maryland
  - State forests of Maryland
- Superfund sites in Maryland
- Wildlife of Maryland
  - Flora of Maryland
  - Fauna of Maryland
    - Birds of Maryland
- Maryland BayStat

==== Natural geographic features of Maryland ====
- Islands of Maryland
- Lakes of Maryland
- Mountains of Maryland
- Rivers of Maryland

=== Regions of Maryland ===
- Central Maryland
- Eastern Maryland
- Southern Maryland
- Western Maryland

==== Administrative divisions of Maryland ====
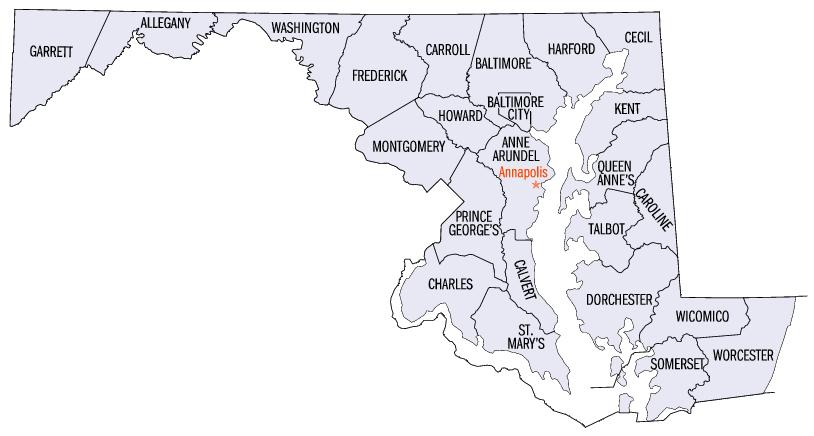
An enlargeable map of the 23 counties and 1 independent city of the state of Maryland

- The 23 counties of the state of Maryland
  - Municipalities in Maryland
    - Cities in Maryland
      - State capital of Maryland: Annapolis
      - City nicknames in Maryland
      - Sister cities in Maryland
    - Towns in Maryland
    - Unincorporated communities in Maryland
  - Census-designated places in Maryland

=== Demography of Maryland ===
Demographics of Maryland

== Government and politics of Maryland ==
Politics of Maryland

- Form of government: U.S. state government
- Maryland's congressional delegations
- Maryland State Capitol
- Elections in Maryland
  - Electoral reform in Maryland
- Political party strength in Maryland

=== Branches of the government of Maryland ===
Government of Maryland

==== Executive branch of the government of Maryland ====
- Governor of Maryland
  - Lieutenant Governor of Maryland
  - Secretary of State of Maryland
  - State Treasurer of Maryland
- State departments
  - Maryland Department of Transportation

==== Legislative branch of the government of Maryland ====
- Maryland General Assembly (bicameral)
  - Upper house: Maryland Senate
  - Lower house: Maryland House of Delegates

==== Judicial branch of the government of Maryland ====
Courts of Maryland

- Supreme Court of Maryland

=== Law and order in Maryland ===
Law of Maryland

- Cannabis in Maryland
- Capital punishment in Maryland
  - Individuals executed in Maryland
- Constitution of Maryland
- Crime in Maryland
- Gun laws in Maryland
- Law enforcement in Maryland
  - Law enforcement agencies in Maryland
    - Maryland State Police
  - Prisons in Maryland
- Same-sex marriage in Maryland

=== Military in Maryland ===
- Maryland Air National Guard
- Maryland Army National Guard

== History of Maryland ==
History of Maryland

=== History of Maryland, by period ===
Location of the state of Maryland in the United States of America

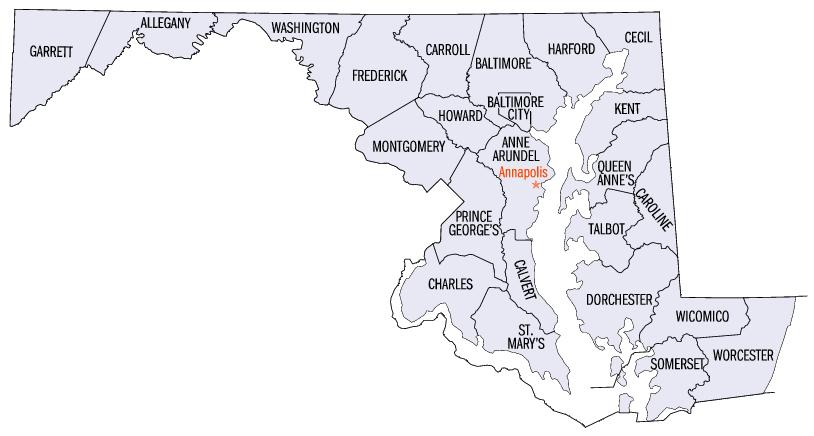
An enlargeable map of the 23 counties and 1 independent city of the state of Maryland

- Prehistory of Maryland
  - Indigenous peoples
- English Colony of Maryland, 1632–1694
  - History of slavery in Maryland
  - Maryland Toleration Act, 1649
- English Province of Maryland, 1694–1707
- British Province of Maryland, 1707–1776
  - French and Indian War, 1754–1763
    - Treaty of Paris of 1763
  - British Indian Reserve (in present Garrett County), 1763–1783
    - Royal Proclamation of 1763
  - Mason–Dixon line, 1763–1767
- American Revolutionary War, April 19, 1775 – September 3, 1783
  - United States Declaration of Independence, July 4, 1776
  - Treaty of Paris, September 3, 1783
- State of Maryland since 1776
    - Thirteenth state to ratify the Articles of Confederation and Perpetual Union, signed March 1, 1781
  - Seventh State to ratify the Constitution of the United States of America on April 26, 1788
  - War of 1812, June 18, 1812 – March 23, 1815
    - Battle of Bladensburg, 1814
    - Battle of Baltimore, 1814
    - Treaty of Ghent, December 24, 1814
  - Mexican–American War, April 25, 1846 – February 2, 1848
  - Baltimore Plot, 1861
  - American Civil War, April 12, 1861 – May 13, 1865
    - Maryland in the American Civil War
      - Border state, 1861–1865
      - Maryland Campaign, September 4–20, 1862
        - Battle of Antietam, September 17, 1862
      - Gettysburg campaign, June 9 – July 14, 1863

=== History of Maryland, by region ===
- by city
  - History of Baltimore
  - History of Cumberland, Maryland
  - History of Frederick, Maryland
- by county
  - History of Garrett County, Maryland

=== History of Maryland, by subject ===
- List of Maryland state legislatures
- History of MTA Maryland
- History of Maryland Route 200

== Culture of Maryland ==
Culture of Maryland

- Museums in Maryland
- Religion in Maryland
  - Episcopal Diocese of Maryland
- Scouting in Maryland
- State symbols of Maryland
  - Flag of the State of Maryland
  - Great Seal of the State of Maryland

=== The Arts in Maryland ===
- Music of Maryland
- Theater in Maryland

=== Sports in Maryland ===
Sports in Maryland

- Professional sports teams in Maryland

== Economy and infrastructure of Maryland ==
Economy of Maryland

- Business in Maryland
- Communications in Maryland
  - Newspapers in Maryland
  - Radio stations in Maryland
  - Television stations in Maryland
- Health care in Maryland
  - Hospitals in Maryland
- Transportation in Maryland
  - Airports in Maryland
  - Roads in Maryland
    - U.S. Highways in Maryland
    - Interstate Highways in Maryland
    - State highways in Maryland

== Education in Maryland ==
Education in Maryland

- Schools in Maryland
  - School districts in Maryland
    - High schools in Maryland
  - Colleges and universities in Maryland
    - University of Maryland, College Park

== See also ==
- Topic overview:
  - Maryland
  - Index of Maryland-related articles
