= Cylburn Arboretum =

Arboretum and gardens in Baltimore, Maryland, United States

- Cylburn House and Park District
- U.S. National Register of Historic Places
- U.S. Historic district
- Baltimore City Landmark
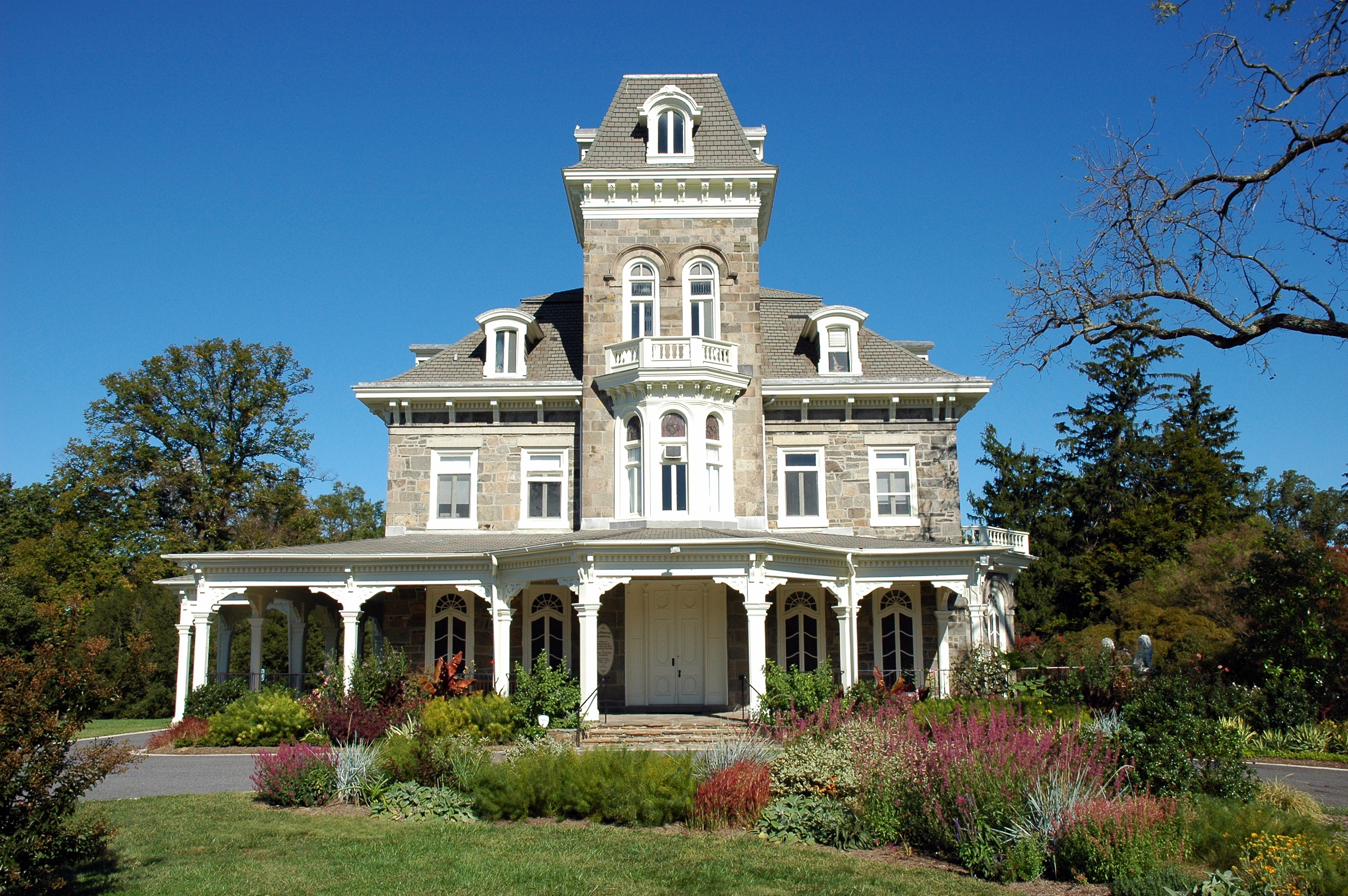
- Cylburn Mansion

- Location within Baltimore
- Location: 4915 Greenspring Ave., Baltimore, Maryland
- Coordinates: 39°21′9″N 76°39′10″W
- Area: 207 acres (84 ha)
- Built: 1863
- Architect: George A. Frederick
- Architectural style: Renaissance
- NRHP reference No.: 72001493

Significant dates
- Added to NRHP: May 04, 1972
- Designated BCL: 1975

Cylburn Arboretum (/ˈsɪlbɜːrn ɑːrbəˈriːtəm/ SIL-burn ar-bə-REE-təm) is a city park with an arboretum and gardens, located at 4915 Greenspring Avenue, Baltimore, Maryland. It is open daily – excluding Mondays – without charge.

The arboretum began as the private estate of businessman Jesse Tyson, who started construction of Cylburn Mansion in 1863. The house, designed by Baltimore City Hall architect George Aloysius Frederick, was eventually completed in 1888 and remains intact- a stone structure built of gneiss from Tyson's quarries at Bare Hills, with mansard roof, tower, and an Italianate cupola. It became the Cylburn Wildflower Preserve and Garden Center in 1954 and, in 1982, was renamed the Cylburn Arboretum Association.

The Cylburn Mansion houses a display of watercolor paintings of Maryland wildflowers that is open to the public.

Today, the arboretum contains an extensive collection of trees and woody shrubs based loosely on the Tysons' original plantings. Collections include azaleas, bamboo, beeches, boxwoods, chestnuts, conifers, hollies, Japanese maples, magnolias, maples, Maryland oaks, and viburnum.

The arboretum also includes a number of flower and vegetable gardens, as well as greenhouses designed and built in the 1960s by Lord & Burnham. The greenhouses grow plants for the city's parks, and are not open to the general public.

The arboretum is included in the Baltimore National Heritage Area.

It was used as a filming location for "Final Grades", a 2006 episode of The Wire, in which Bodie Broadus and Jimmy McNulty have a conversation in the park.

== Gallery of trees at Cylburn Arboretum ==
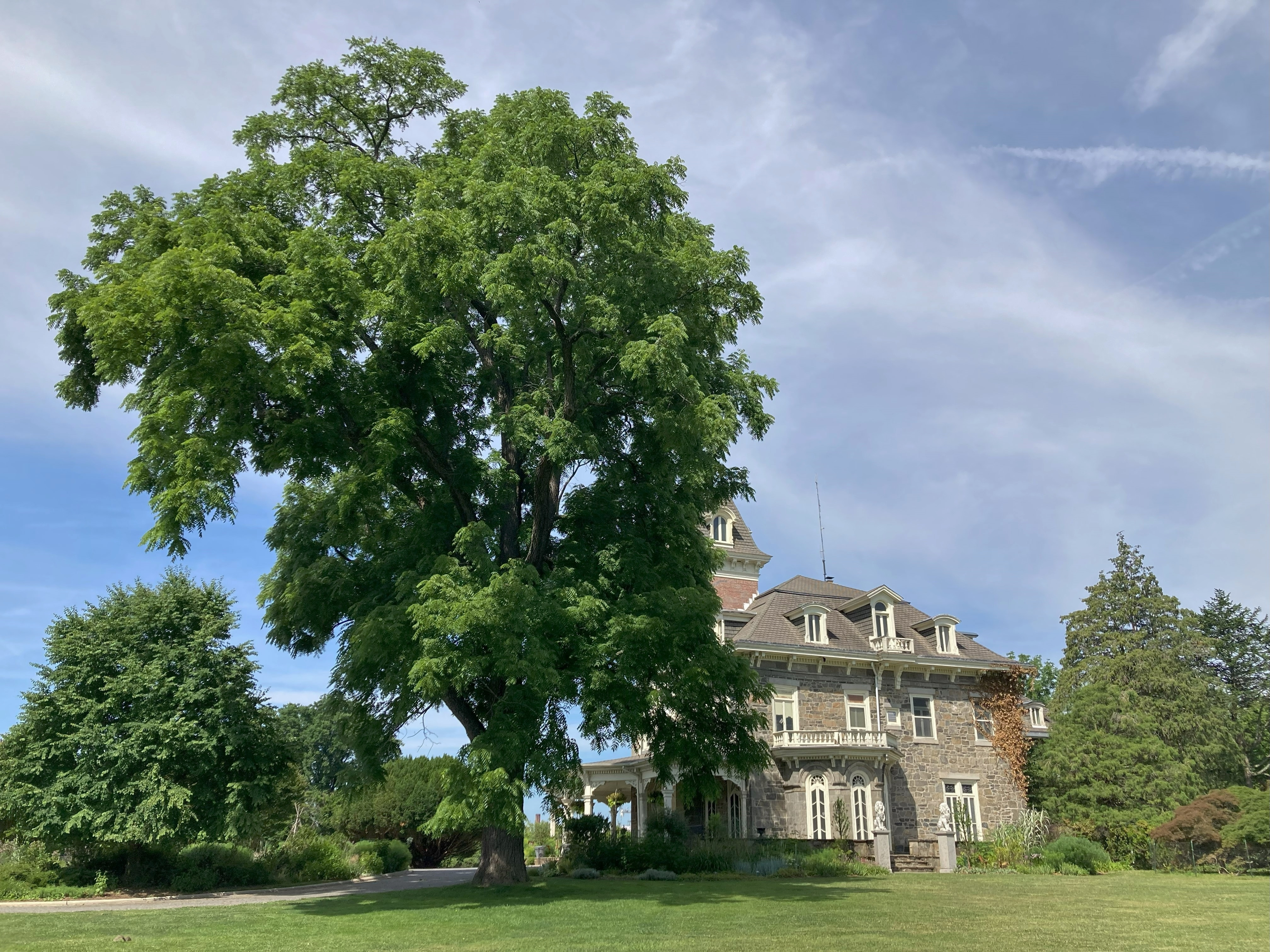
Black walnut (June 2024)

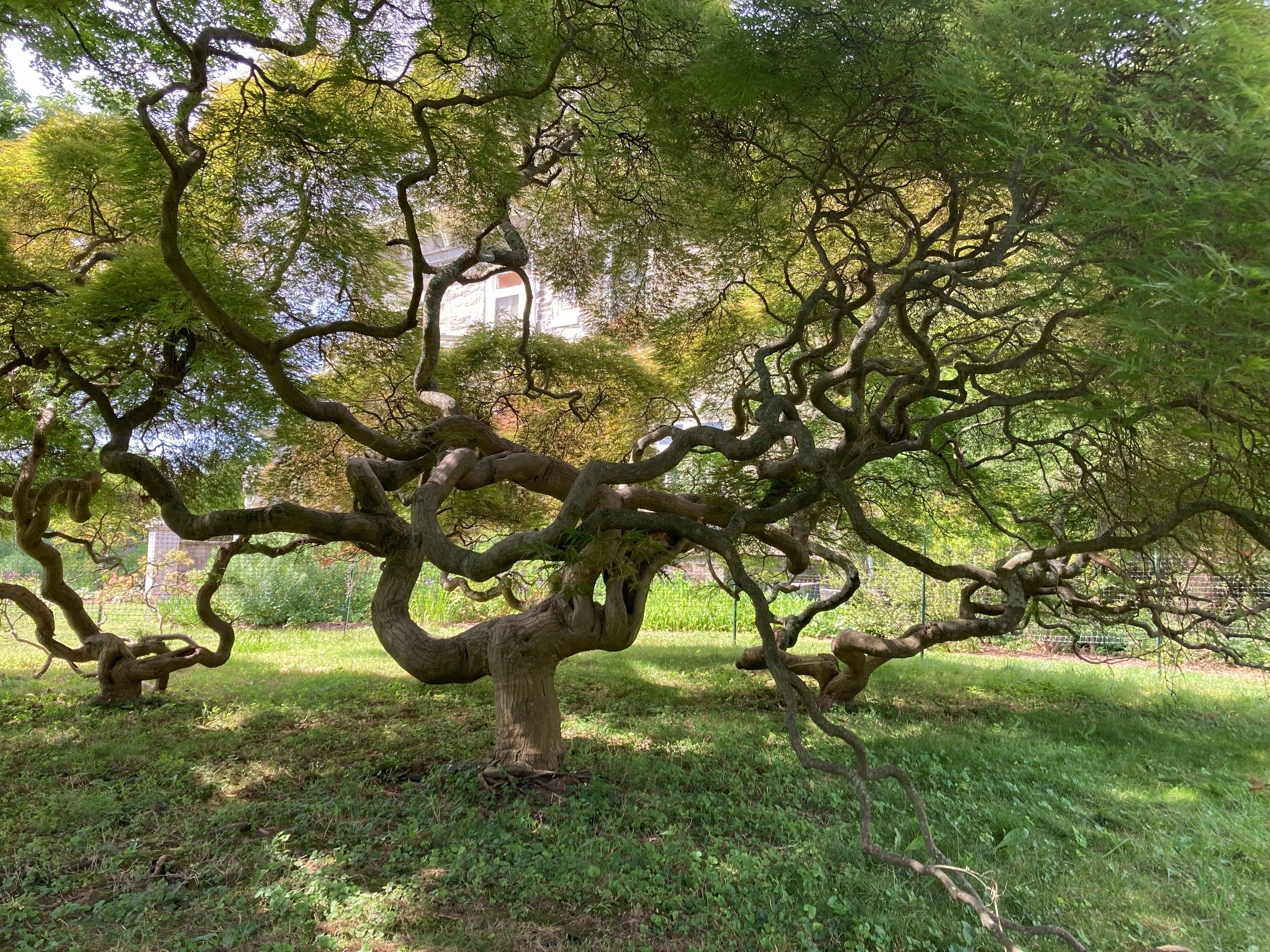
Japanese threadleaf maple (June 2024)

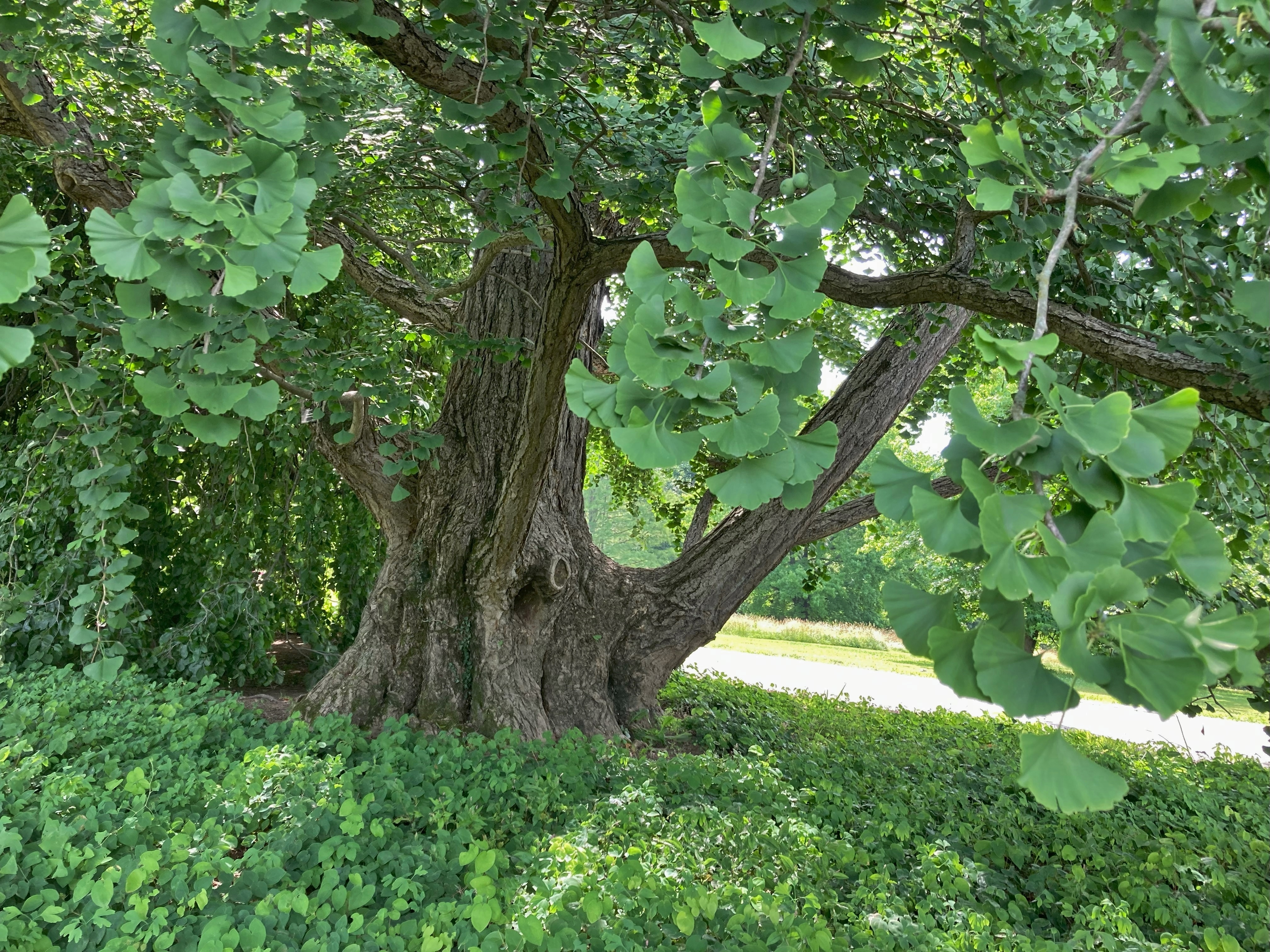
Female ginkgo (June 2024)

== See also ==
- Mt. Washington Arboretum
- List of botanical gardens in the United States
