= Mount Hope College =

Mount Hope College may refer to:

- Mount Hope College (Ohio) a defunct college at Rogers, Ohio, once managed by Asher A. Galbreath
- Mount Hope College (Maryland) a defunct college that was located at what was then the external boundaries of Baltimore, Maryland
