= List of colleges and universities in Maryland =

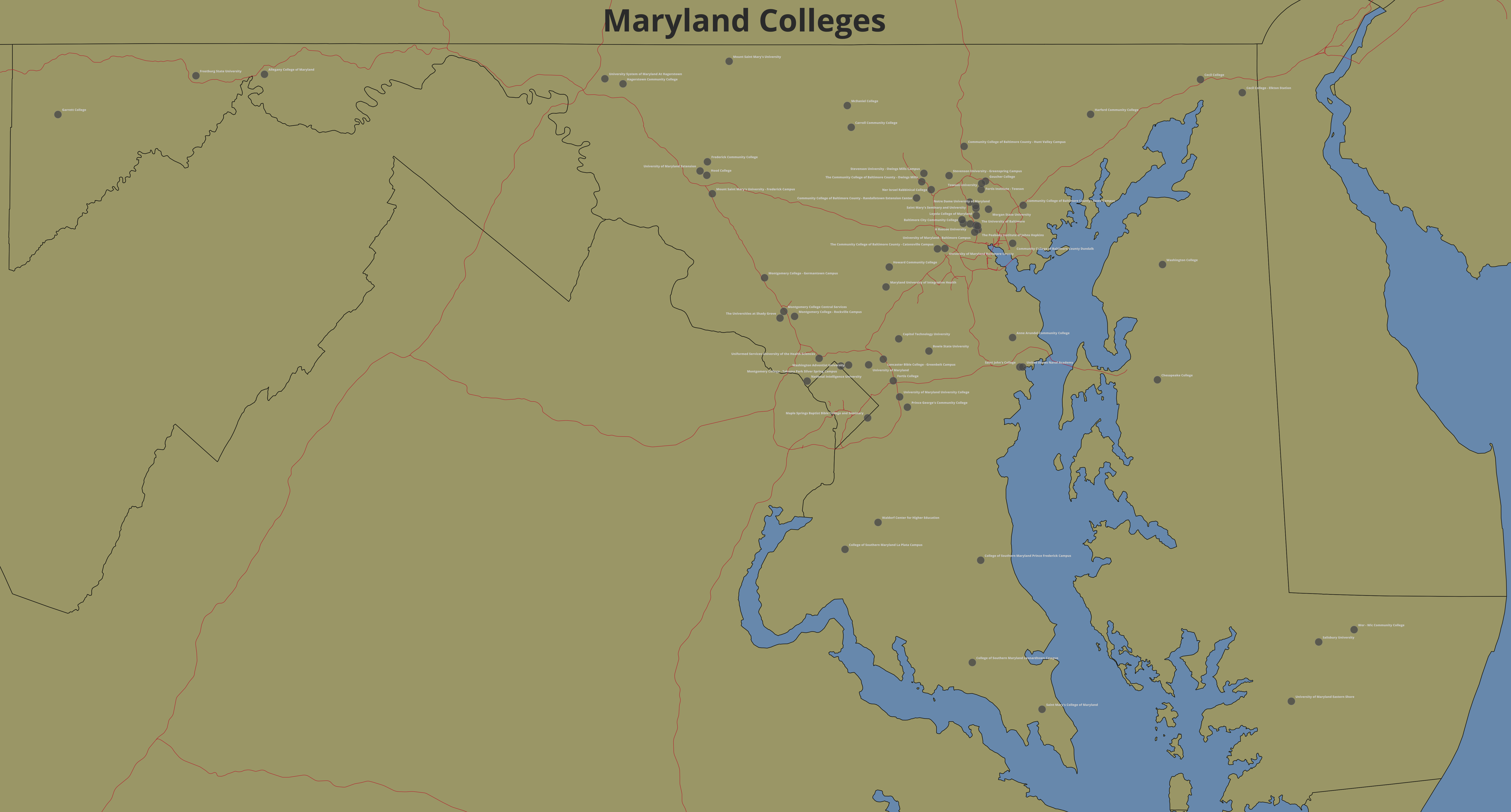
Maryland Colleges

There are currently 55 colleges and universities, defined as accredited, degree-granting, postsecondary institutions, in the state of Maryland.

The state's public universities are part of the University System of Maryland, with the exception of United States Naval Academy, St. Mary's College of Maryland, Morgan State University and Uniformed Services University of the Health Sciences, which are public but are not part of the university system. The characteristics of each institution varies from small, intimate, liberal arts colleges such as Washington College and McDaniel College to large, public, research universities such as the University of Maryland, College Park. The oldest school in the state is St. John's College, formerly King William's School, founded in 1696, and the third oldest college or university in the United States. The newest school in the state is the Wor–Wic Community College founded in 1975. The University System of Maryland has two regional higher education centers where several state universities operate satellite programs, the University System of Maryland at Hagerstown founded in 2008 and the Universities at Shady Grove founded in 2000.

Maryland state flag

As of 2005, approximately 310,689 students (undergraduate, graduate, & professional) were enrolled at Maryland universities and colleges. In fall 2010, 369,320 students (undergraduate, graduate, & professional) enrolled at Maryland universities and colleges (increase of 18.87% since 2005), the highest such enrollment in State history. Women accounted for 57.5% of all students. For undergraduates, Maryland residents constituted 93% of enrollees at community colleges, 76.5% at public four-year institutions, and 54.4% at independent universities and colleges. Universities and colleges in Maryland with regional accreditation are accredited by the Middle States Commission on Higher Education.

== Public four-year colleges and universities ==
| Name | Location | Founded | Type (Background) | Enrollment (fall 2024) | Ref |
|---|---|---|---|---|---|
| Bowie State University | Bowie | 1865 | USM (HBCU) | 6,353 | |
| Coppin State University | Baltimore | 1900 | USM (HBCU) | 2,210 | |
| Frostburg State University | Frostburg | 1899 | USM (teaching) | 4,104 | |
| Morgan State University | Baltimore | 1867 | Independent (HBCU) | 10,739 | |
| Salisbury University | Salisbury | 1925 | USM (teaching) | 7,025 | |
| St. Mary’s College of Maryland | St. Mary's City | 1840 | Liberal arts college | 1,630 | |
| Towson University | Towson | 1866 | USM (teaching) | 19,401 | |
| United States Naval Academy | Annapolis | 1845 | Service academy | 4,474 | |
| University of Baltimore | Baltimore | 1925 | USM | 3,187 | |
| University of Maryland, Baltimore | Baltimore | 1807 | USM | 6,636 | |
| University of Maryland, Baltimore County | Catonsville | 1966 | USM | 13,906 | |
| University of Maryland, College Park | College Park | 1856 | USM (flagship) | 41,725 | |
| University of Maryland Eastern Shore | Princess Anne | 1886 | USM (HBCU) | 3,177 | |
| University of Maryland Global Campus | Adelphi | 1947 | USM | 63,012 | |

== Private, non-profit colleges and universities ==
| Name | Location | Founded | Enrollment (fall 2024) | Ref |
|---|---|---|---|---|
| Capitol Technology University | Laurel | 1927 | 1,065 | |
| Goucher College | Towson | 1885 | 1,459 | |
| Hood College | Frederick | 1893 | 2,101 | |
| Johns Hopkins University | Baltimore | 1876 | 30,210 | |
| Loyola University Maryland | Baltimore | 1852 | 4,897 | |
| Maryland Institute College of Art | Baltimore | 1826 | 1,687 | |
| McDaniel College | Westminster | 1867 | 2,868 | |
| Mount St. Mary's University | Emmitsburg | 1808 | 2,408 | |
| Notre Dame of Maryland University | Baltimore | 1873 | 1,788 | |
| St. John's College | Annapolis | 1784 | 583 | |
| Stevenson University | Stevenson | 1947 | 3,684 | |
| Washington Adventist University | Takoma Park | 1904 | 612 | |
| Washington College | Chestertown | 1782 | 923 | |

== Public upper-division and graduate institutions or regional center campuses ==
| Name | Location | Founded | Ref |
|---|---|---|---|
| University of Maryland, Biotechnology Institute | Baltimore | 1985 | |
| University of Maryland, Environmental Science | Cambridge | 1925 | |
| University System of Maryland at Hagerstown | Hagerstown | 2005 | |
| University System of Maryland at Southern Maryland | California | 2019 | |
| Universities at Shady Grove | Rockville | 2000 | |
| Uniformed Services University of the Health Sciences | Bethesda | 1972 | |

== Public two-year community colleges ==
| Name | Location | Founded | Ref |
|---|---|---|---|
| Allegany College of Maryland | Cumberland | 1961 | |
| Anne Arundel Community College | Arnold | 1961 | |
| Baltimore City Community College | Baltimore | 1947 | |
| Carroll Community College | Westminster | 1976 | |
| Cecil College | North East | 1968 | |
| Chesapeake College | Wye Mills | 1965 | |
| College of Southern Maryland | Multiple in Southern Maryland | 1958 | |
| Community College of Baltimore County | Multiple in Baltimore County | 1957 | |
| Frederick Community College | Frederick | 1957 | |
| Garrett College | McHenry | 1967 | |
| Hagerstown Community College | Hagerstown | 1946 | |
| Harford Community College | Bel Air | 1957 | |
| Howard Community College | Columbia | 1966 | |
| Montgomery College | Multiple in Montgomery County | 1946 | |
| Prince George's Community College | Largo | 1958 | |
| Wor–Wic Community College | Salisbury | 1975 | |

== Private, non-profit religious institutions ==
| Name | Location | Founded | Enrollment | Ref |
|---|---|---|---|---|
| Breakthrough Bible College | National Harbor | 2000 | N/A | |
| St. Mary's Seminary and University | Baltimore | 1791 | N/A | |
| Yeshivas Ner Yisroel | Pikesville | 1933 | 449 | |
| Yeshiva College of The Nation's Capital | Kemp Mill | 1998 | 56 | |

== Maryland-based, accredited, for-profit institution ==
| Name | Location | Founded | Enrollment | Ref |
|---|---|---|---|---|
| Lincoln Tech | Columbia | 1960 | 1,258 | |

== Defunct Institutions ==
| Name | Location | Founded | Ref |
|---|---|---|---|
| Asbury College | Baltimore | 1816–1830 | |
| Baltimore College | Baltimore | 1803–1830 | |
| Baltimore Female College | Baltimore | 1849–1890 | |
| Baltimore Hebrew University | Baltimore | 1919–2009 (merged with Towson University) | |
| Blue Ridge College (was Maryland Collegiate Institute) | Union Bridge, New Windsor | 1898–1943 (renamed Blue Ridge College in 1910; bought and moved into New Windsor College in 1912) | |
| Borromeo College | Pikesville | 1860–1872 | |
| Calvert College | New Windsor | 1852–1873 (occupied the location of the first New Windsor College) | |
| Capital Bible Seminary | Greenbelt | 1940–2013 (acquired by Lancaster Bible College) | |
| Chevy Chase Junior College | Chevy Chase | 1903–1950 | |
| Cokesbury College | Abingdon | 1784–1796 | |
| College of St. James | Hagerstown vicinity | 1843–1863 | |
| Eastern Christian College | Bel Air | 1946–2005 | |
| Irving College | Manchester | 1858–1880 | |
| Kee Mar College | Hagerstown | 1853–1911 | |
| Maryland Military and Naval Academy | Oxford | 1885–1887 | |
| Maryland University of Integrative Health | Laurel | 1974–2025 (acquired by Notre Dame of Maryland University) | |
| Mount Hope College | Baltimore | 1832–1844 | |
| Mount Saint Agnes College | Baltimore | 1890–1971 (merged with Loyola University Maryland) | |
| Mount Washington Female College | Mount Washington | 1856–1861 | |
| National Labor College | Silver Spring | 1969–2014 | |
| New Windsor College | New Windsor | 1843–1850 | |
| Newton University | Baltimore | 1844–1859 | |
| Saint Joseph College | Emmitsburg | 1902–1973 (Merged with Mount St. Mary's University) | |
| St. Mary's College | Baltimore | 1806–1852 (St. Mary's College, a civil college, was operated by the Sulpicians religious order until 1852, when it was closed and replaced by Loyola College.) | |
| Sojourner–Douglass College | Baltimore | 1972–2015 | |
| TESST College of Technology | Baltimore, Beltsville, Towson | 1957–2018 | |
| Woodstock College | Woodstock | 1869–1974 | |

== See also ==
- List of college athletic programs in Maryland
- Higher education in the United States
- Lists of American institutions of higher education
- List of recognized higher education accreditation organizations
