= Hagerstown Commercial Core Historic District =

Historic district in Maryland, United States

- U.S. National Register of Historic Places
- U.S. Historic district
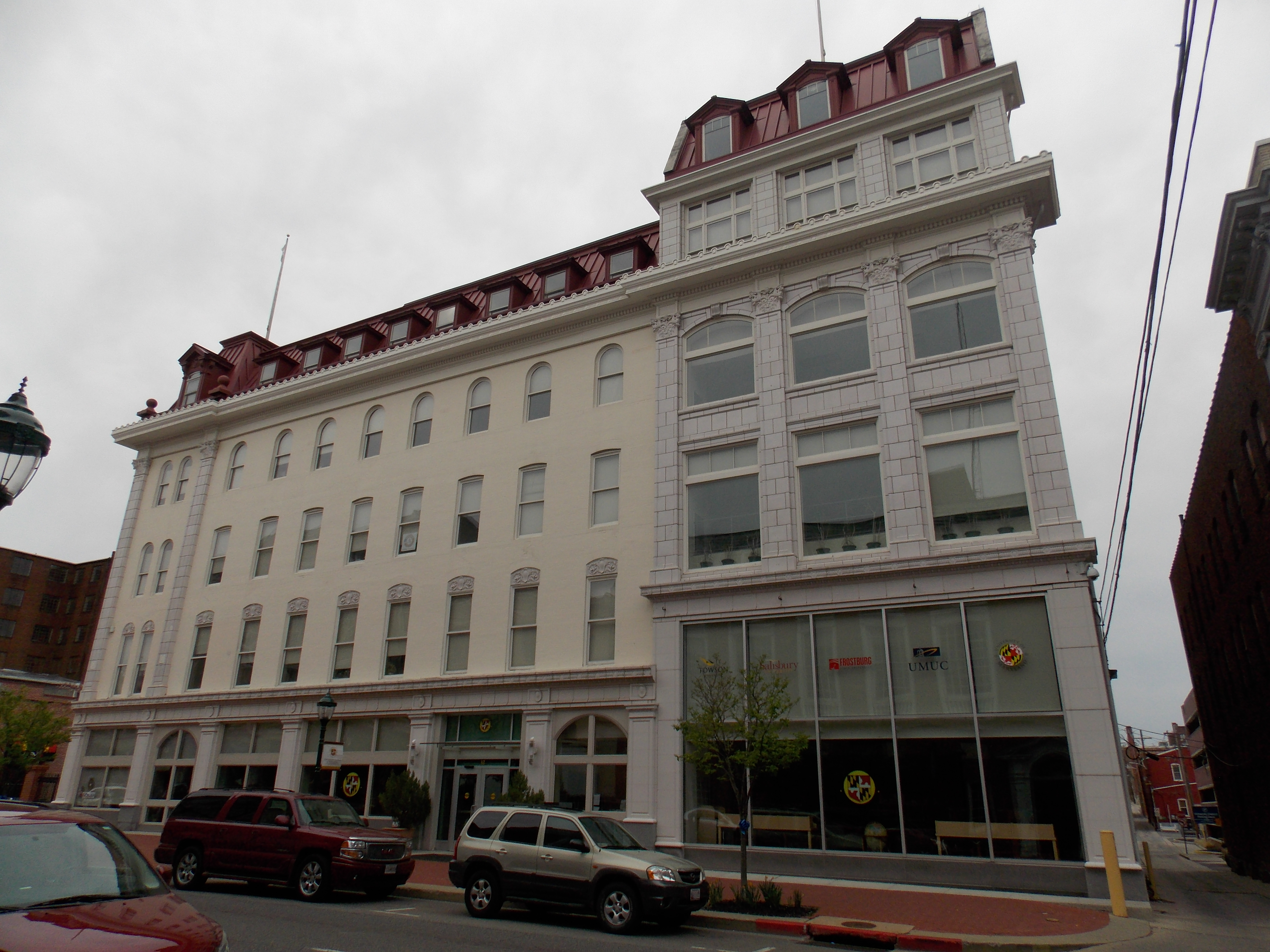
- The old Baldwin House Hotel building along West Washington Street

- Location within Maryland Location within the United States
- Location: Potomac, Washington, Franklin, Antietam, Summit and Jonathan Sts., Hagerstown, Maryland
- Coordinates: 39°38′33″N 77°43′18″W
- Area: 26 acres (11 ha)
- Architectural style: Beaux Arts, Italianate
- NRHP reference No.: 83002964
- Added to NRHP: January 17, 1983

Hagerstown Commercial Core Historic District is a national historic district at Hagerstown, Washington County, Maryland, United States.

It was added to the National Register of Historic Places in 1983.

== Background ==
The district consists approximately of a one and a half by two block rectangle which includes the major retail center of town. The center of the district is the public square and it is made up almost entirely of commercial buildings constructed or remodeled for retail purposes during the last 20 years of the 19th century and the first 20 years of the 20th century. Also in the district are the Washington County Courthouse and the City Hall.

== See also ==
- U.S. Route 40 in Maryland
