= Maryland Free Press =

Defunct weekly newspaper in Maryland, US

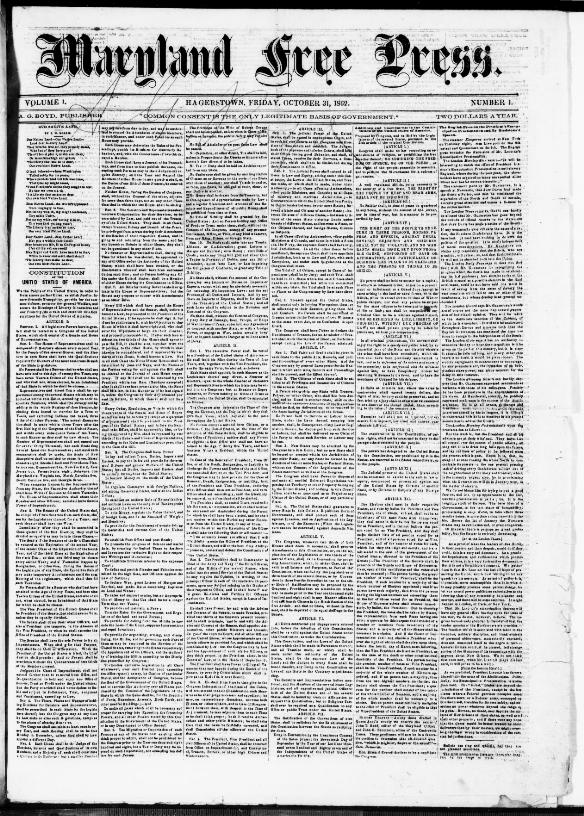
Front page of the Maryland Free Press (Hagerstown, Md.), October 13, 1862. Via Chronicling America

The Maryland Free Press was a weekly newspaper published in Hagerstown, Maryland, from 1862 to 1876, with a hiatus from 1863 to 1866. Its editorial perspective included support for secession, the Confederacy, and the Democratic party.

The Maryland Free Press was founded in November 1862 by owner and publisher Andrew G. Boyd. Boyd was arrested on March 12, 1863, for printing material hostile to United States government and exiled to the South, where he served in the Confederate Army. The Free Press was suspended by the federal government for three years following Boyd's arrest, until its revival on May 3, 1866, in Williamsport, Maryland. The paper returned to Hagerstown in late 1866. The paper was renamed the Reporter and Advertiser in March 1875, then sold to the Hagerstown Mail and discontinued in April 1876.

Contents of the Maryland Free Press included local news, war reports, market reports, agricultural news, and advertisements. Post-Civil War coverage was critical of Reconstruction and of civil rights for freed slaves.
