= Maryland statistical areas =

Coordinates: 39.0550°N 76.7909°W

The U.S. State of Maryland currently has 13 statistical areas that have been delineated by the Office of Management and Budget (OMB). On July 21, 2023, the OMB delineated three combined statistical areas, six metropolitan statistical areas, and four micropolitan statistical areas in Maryland. As of 2023, the largest of these is the Washington-Baltimore-Arlington, DC-MD-VA-WV-PA CSA, comprising Washington, D.C. and its suburbs as well as Maryland's largest city of Baltimore and its capital, Annapolis.

== Statistical areas ==
The Office of Management and Budget (OMB) has designated more than 1,000 statistical areas for the United States and Puerto Rico. These statistical areas are important geographic delineations of population clusters used by the OMB, the United States Census Bureau, planning organizations, and federal, state, and local government entities.

The OMB defines a core-based statistical area (commonly referred to as a CBSA) as the county or counties (or county-equivalents) surrounding at least one densely-settled core of at least 10,000 population, "plus adjacent counties having a high degree of social and economic integration with the core as measured through commuting ties with the counties containing the core". The OMB further divides core-based statistical areas based on population into metropolitan statistical areas (MSAs) for those with at least 50,000 and micropolitan statistical areas (μSAs) for those with 10,000 to 49,999 people.

The OMB defines a combined statistical area (CSA) as two or more adjacent core-based statistical areas where the employment interchange rate (% commuting from A to B plus % commuting from B to A) is at least 15%. The primary statistical areas (PSAs) include all combined statistical areas and any core-based statistical area that is not a constituent of a combined statistical area.

The 13 United States statistical areas and 24 counties of the State of Maryland (Note: An out-of-state area and its population are displayed in green. An area that extends into more than one state is displayed in purple. A purple population number over a black population number show the total population versus the in-state population. The state's abbreviation is also shown next to the in-state total.)
Combined statistical area	2025 population (est.)	Core-based statistical area	2025 population (est.)	County	2025 population (est.)	Metropolitan division	2025 population (est.)
Washington-Baltimore-Arlington, DC-MD-VA-WV-PA CSA	10,274,894; 5,822,986 (MD)	Washington-Arlington-Alexandria, DC-VA-MD-WV MSA	6,465,724; 2,524,432 (MD)	Fairfax County, Virginia	1,167,873	Arlington-Alexandria-Reston, VA-WV MD	3,247,647
Washington-Baltimore-Arlington, DC-MD-VA-WV-PA CSA	10,274,894; 5,822,986 (MD)	Washington-Arlington-Alexandria, DC-VA-MD-WV MSA	6,465,724; 2,524,432 (MD)	Prince William County, Virginia	502,966	Arlington-Alexandria-Reston, VA-WV MD	3,247,647
Washington-Baltimore-Arlington, DC-MD-VA-WV-PA CSA	10,274,894; 5,822,986 (MD)	Washington-Arlington-Alexandria, DC-VA-MD-WV MSA	6,465,724; 2,524,432 (MD)	Loudoun County, Virginia	449,749	Arlington-Alexandria-Reston, VA-WV MD	3,247,647
Washington-Baltimore-Arlington, DC-MD-VA-WV-PA CSA	10,274,894; 5,822,986 (MD)	Washington-Arlington-Alexandria, DC-VA-MD-WV MSA	6,465,724; 2,524,432 (MD)	Arlington County, Virginia	243,931	Arlington-Alexandria-Reston, VA-WV MD	3,247,647
Washington-Baltimore-Arlington, DC-MD-VA-WV-PA CSA	10,274,894; 5,822,986 (MD)	Washington-Arlington-Alexandria, DC-VA-MD-WV MSA	6,465,724; 2,524,432 (MD)	Stafford County, Virginia	170,803	Arlington-Alexandria-Reston, VA-WV MD	3,247,647
Washington-Baltimore-Arlington, DC-MD-VA-WV-PA CSA	10,274,894; 5,822,986 (MD)	Washington-Arlington-Alexandria, DC-VA-MD-WV MSA	6,465,724; 2,524,432 (MD)	City of Alexandria, Virginia	160,662	Arlington-Alexandria-Reston, VA-WV MD	3,247,647
Washington-Baltimore-Arlington, DC-MD-VA-WV-PA CSA	10,274,894; 5,822,986 (MD)	Washington-Arlington-Alexandria, DC-VA-MD-WV MSA	6,465,724; 2,524,432 (MD)	Spotsylvania County, Virginia	155,388	Arlington-Alexandria-Reston, VA-WV MD	3,247,647
Washington-Baltimore-Arlington, DC-MD-VA-WV-PA CSA	10,274,894; 5,822,986 (MD)	Washington-Arlington-Alexandria, DC-VA-MD-WV MSA	6,465,724; 2,524,432 (MD)	Fauquier County, Virginia	76,503	Arlington-Alexandria-Reston, VA-WV MD	3,247,647
Washington-Baltimore-Arlington, DC-MD-VA-WV-PA CSA	10,274,894; 5,822,986 (MD)	Washington-Arlington-Alexandria, DC-VA-MD-WV MSA	6,465,724; 2,524,432 (MD)	Jefferson County, West Virginia	63,102	Arlington-Alexandria-Reston, VA-WV MD	3,247,647
Washington-Baltimore-Arlington, DC-MD-VA-WV-PA CSA	10,274,894; 5,822,986 (MD)	Washington-Arlington-Alexandria, DC-VA-MD-WV MSA	6,465,724; 2,524,432 (MD)	Culpeper County, Virginia	57,666	Arlington-Alexandria-Reston, VA-WV MD	3,247,647
Washington-Baltimore-Arlington, DC-MD-VA-WV-PA CSA	10,274,894; 5,822,986 (MD)	Washington-Arlington-Alexandria, DC-VA-MD-WV MSA	6,465,724; 2,524,432 (MD)	City of Manassas, Virginia	44,332	Arlington-Alexandria-Reston, VA-WV MD	3,247,647
Washington-Baltimore-Arlington, DC-MD-VA-WV-PA CSA	10,274,894; 5,822,986 (MD)	Washington-Arlington-Alexandria, DC-VA-MD-WV MSA	6,465,724; 2,524,432 (MD)	Warren County, Virginia	42,740	Arlington-Alexandria-Reston, VA-WV MD	3,247,647
Washington-Baltimore-Arlington, DC-MD-VA-WV-PA CSA	10,274,894; 5,822,986 (MD)	Washington-Arlington-Alexandria, DC-VA-MD-WV MSA	6,465,724; 2,524,432 (MD)	City of Fredericksburg, Virginia	30,393	Arlington-Alexandria-Reston, VA-WV MD	3,247,647
Washington-Baltimore-Arlington, DC-MD-VA-WV-PA CSA	10,274,894; 5,822,986 (MD)	Washington-Arlington-Alexandria, DC-VA-MD-WV MSA	6,465,724; 2,524,432 (MD)	City of Fairfax, Virginia	26,772	Arlington-Alexandria-Reston, VA-WV MD	3,247,647
Washington-Baltimore-Arlington, DC-MD-VA-WV-PA CSA	10,274,894; 5,822,986 (MD)	Washington-Arlington-Alexandria, DC-VA-MD-WV MSA	6,465,724; 2,524,432 (MD)	City of Manassas Park, Virginia	16,560	Arlington-Alexandria-Reston, VA-WV MD	3,247,647
Washington-Baltimore-Arlington, DC-MD-VA-WV-PA CSA	10,274,894; 5,822,986 (MD)	Washington-Arlington-Alexandria, DC-VA-MD-WV MSA	6,465,724; 2,524,432 (MD)	Clarke County, Virginia	15,609	Arlington-Alexandria-Reston, VA-WV MD	3,247,647
Washington-Baltimore-Arlington, DC-MD-VA-WV-PA CSA	10,274,894; 5,822,986 (MD)	Washington-Arlington-Alexandria, DC-VA-MD-WV MSA	6,465,724; 2,524,432 (MD)	City of Falls Church, Virginia	15,159	Arlington-Alexandria-Reston, VA-WV MD	3,247,647
Washington-Baltimore-Arlington, DC-MD-VA-WV-PA CSA	10,274,894; 5,822,986 (MD)	Washington-Arlington-Alexandria, DC-VA-MD-WV MSA	6,465,724; 2,524,432 (MD)	Rappahannock County, Virginia	7,439	Arlington-Alexandria-Reston, VA-WV MD	3,247,647
Washington-Baltimore-Arlington, DC-MD-VA-WV-PA CSA	10,274,894; 5,822,986 (MD)	Washington-Arlington-Alexandria, DC-VA-MD-WV MSA	6,465,724; 2,524,432 (MD)	Prince George's County, Maryland	970,374	Washington, DC-MD MD	1,840,612; 1,146,967 (MD)
Washington-Baltimore-Arlington, DC-MD-VA-WV-PA CSA	10,274,894; 5,822,986 (MD)	Washington-Arlington-Alexandria, DC-VA-MD-WV MSA	6,465,724; 2,524,432 (MD)	District of Columbia	693,645	Washington, DC-MD MD	1,840,612; 1,146,967 (MD)
Washington-Baltimore-Arlington, DC-MD-VA-WV-PA CSA	10,274,894; 5,822,986 (MD)	Washington-Arlington-Alexandria, DC-VA-MD-WV MSA	6,465,724; 2,524,432 (MD)	Charles County, Maryland	176,593	Washington, DC-MD MD	1,840,612; 1,146,967 (MD)
Washington-Baltimore-Arlington, DC-MD-VA-WV-PA CSA	10,274,894; 5,822,986 (MD)	Washington-Arlington-Alexandria, DC-VA-MD-WV MSA	6,465,724; 2,524,432 (MD)	Montgomery County, Maryland	1,074,582	Frederick-Gaithersburg-Bethesda, MD MD	1,377,465
Washington-Baltimore-Arlington, DC-MD-VA-WV-PA CSA	10,274,894; 5,822,986 (MD)	Washington-Arlington-Alexandria, DC-VA-MD-WV MSA	6,465,724; 2,524,432 (MD)	Frederick County, Maryland	302,883	Frederick-Gaithersburg-Bethesda, MD MD	1,377,465
Washington-Baltimore-Arlington, DC-MD-VA-WV-PA CSA	10,274,894; 5,822,986 (MD)	Baltimore-Columbia-Towson, MD MSA	2,857,781	Baltimore County, Maryland	847,650	none	
Washington-Baltimore-Arlington, DC-MD-VA-WV-PA CSA	10,274,894; 5,822,986 (MD)	Baltimore-Columbia-Towson, MD MSA	2,857,781	Anne Arundel County, Maryland	603,380	none	
Washington-Baltimore-Arlington, DC-MD-VA-WV-PA CSA	10,274,894; 5,822,986 (MD)	Baltimore-Columbia-Towson, MD MSA	2,857,781	Baltimore City, Maryland	569,997	none	
Washington-Baltimore-Arlington, DC-MD-VA-WV-PA CSA	10,274,894; 5,822,986 (MD)	Baltimore-Columbia-Towson, MD MSA	2,857,781	Howard County, Maryland	339,183	none	
Washington-Baltimore-Arlington, DC-MD-VA-WV-PA CSA	10,274,894; 5,822,986 (MD)	Baltimore-Columbia-Towson, MD MSA	2,857,781	Harford County, Maryland	266,446	none	
Washington-Baltimore-Arlington, DC-MD-VA-WV-PA CSA	10,274,894; 5,822,986 (MD)	Baltimore-Columbia-Towson, MD MSA	2,857,781	Carroll County, Maryland	176,677	none	
Washington-Baltimore-Arlington, DC-MD-VA-WV-PA CSA	10,274,894; 5,822,986 (MD)	Baltimore-Columbia-Towson, MD MSA	2,857,781	Queen Anne's County, Maryland	54,448	none	
Washington-Baltimore-Arlington, DC-MD-VA-WV-PA CSA	10,274,894; 5,822,986 (MD)	Hagerstown-Martinsburg, MD-WV MSA	315,280; 157,731 (MD)	Washington County, Maryland	157,731	none	
Washington-Baltimore-Arlington, DC-MD-VA-WV-PA CSA	10,274,894; 5,822,986 (MD)	Hagerstown-Martinsburg, MD-WV MSA	315,280; 157,731 (MD)	Berkeley County, West Virginia	139,522	none	
Washington-Baltimore-Arlington, DC-MD-VA-WV-PA CSA	10,274,894; 5,822,986 (MD)	Hagerstown-Martinsburg, MD-WV MSA	315,280; 157,731 (MD)	Morgan County, West Virginia	18,027	none	
Washington-Baltimore-Arlington, DC-MD-VA-WV-PA CSA	10,274,894; 5,822,986 (MD)	Lexington Park, MD MSA	211,176	St. Mary's County, Maryland	116,692	none	
Washington-Baltimore-Arlington, DC-MD-VA-WV-PA CSA	10,274,894; 5,822,986 (MD)	Lexington Park, MD MSA	211,176	Calvert County, Maryland	94,484	none	
Washington-Baltimore-Arlington, DC-MD-VA-WV-PA CSA	10,274,894; 5,822,986 (MD)	Chambersburg-Waynesboro, PA MSA	160,652	Franklin County, Pennsylvania	160,652	none	
Washington-Baltimore-Arlington, DC-MD-VA-WV-PA CSA	10,274,894; 5,822,986 (MD)	Winchester, VA-WV MSA	152,332	Frederick County, Virginia	99,955	none	
Washington-Baltimore-Arlington, DC-MD-VA-WV-PA CSA	10,274,894; 5,822,986 (MD)	Winchester, VA-WV MSA	152,332	City of Winchester, Virginia	28,272	none	
Washington-Baltimore-Arlington, DC-MD-VA-WV-PA CSA	10,274,894; 5,822,986 (MD)	Winchester, VA-WV MSA	152,332	Hampshire County, West Virginia	24,105	none	
Washington-Baltimore-Arlington, DC-MD-VA-WV-PA CSA	10,274,894; 5,822,986 (MD)	Lake of the Woods, VA μSA	40,083	Orange County, Virginia	40,083	none	
Washington-Baltimore-Arlington, DC-MD-VA-WV-PA CSA	10,274,894; 5,822,986 (MD)	Easton, MD μSA	38,238	Talbot County, Maryland	38,238	none	
Washington-Baltimore-Arlington, DC-MD-VA-WV-PA CSA	10,274,894; 5,822,986 (MD)	Cambridge, MD μSA	33,628	Dorchester County, Maryland	33,628	none	
Salisbury-Ocean Pines, MD CSA	183,881	Salisbury, MD MSA	131,872	Wicomico County, Maryland	106,899	none	
Salisbury-Ocean Pines, MD CSA	183,881	Salisbury, MD MSA	131,872	Somerset County, Maryland	24,973	none	
Salisbury-Ocean Pines, MD CSA	183,881	Ocean Pines, MD μSA	54,459	Worcester County, Maryland	54,459	none	
Philadelphia-Reading-Camden, PA-NJ-DE-MD CSA	7,493,171; 107,131 (MD)	Philadelphia-Camden-Wilmington, PA-NJ-DE-MD MSA	6,329,118; 107,131 (MD)	Philadelphia County, Pennsylvania	1,574,281	Philadelphia, PA MD	2,155,218
Philadelphia-Reading-Camden, PA-NJ-DE-MD CSA	7,493,171; 107,131 (MD)	Philadelphia-Camden-Wilmington, PA-NJ-DE-MD MSA	6,329,118; 107,131 (MD)	Delaware County, Pennsylvania	580,937	Philadelphia, PA MD	2,155,218
Philadelphia-Reading-Camden, PA-NJ-DE-MD CSA	7,493,171; 107,131 (MD)	Philadelphia-Camden-Wilmington, PA-NJ-DE-MD MSA	6,329,118; 107,131 (MD)	Montgomery County, Pennsylvania	877,643	Montgomery County-Bucks County-Chester County, PA MD	2,082,587
Philadelphia-Reading-Camden, PA-NJ-DE-MD CSA	7,493,171; 107,131 (MD)	Philadelphia-Camden-Wilmington, PA-NJ-DE-MD MSA	6,329,118; 107,131 (MD)	Bucks County, Pennsylvania	647,828	Montgomery County-Bucks County-Chester County, PA MD	2,082,587
Philadelphia-Reading-Camden, PA-NJ-DE-MD CSA	7,493,171; 107,131 (MD)	Philadelphia-Camden-Wilmington, PA-NJ-DE-MD MSA	6,329,118; 107,131 (MD)	Chester County, Pennsylvania	557,116	Montgomery County-Bucks County-Chester County, PA MD	2,082,587
Philadelphia-Reading-Camden, PA-NJ-DE-MD CSA	7,493,171; 107,131 (MD)	Philadelphia-Camden-Wilmington, PA-NJ-DE-MD MSA	6,329,118; 107,131 (MD)	Camden County, New Jersey	535,799	Camden, NJ MD	1,329,876
Philadelphia-Reading-Camden, PA-NJ-DE-MD CSA	7,493,171; 107,131 (MD)	Philadelphia-Camden-Wilmington, PA-NJ-DE-MD MSA	6,329,118; 107,131 (MD)	Burlington County, New Jersey	481,439	Camden, NJ MD	1,329,876
Philadelphia-Reading-Camden, PA-NJ-DE-MD CSA	7,493,171; 107,131 (MD)	Philadelphia-Camden-Wilmington, PA-NJ-DE-MD MSA	6,329,118; 107,131 (MD)	Gloucester County, New Jersey	312,638	Camden, NJ MD	1,329,876
Philadelphia-Reading-Camden, PA-NJ-DE-MD CSA	7,493,171; 107,131 (MD)	Philadelphia-Camden-Wilmington, PA-NJ-DE-MD MSA	6,329,118; 107,131 (MD)	New Castle County, Delaware	588,026	Wilmington, DE-MD-NJ MD	782,812; 107,131 (MD)
Philadelphia-Reading-Camden, PA-NJ-DE-MD CSA	7,493,171; 107,131 (MD)	Philadelphia-Camden-Wilmington, PA-NJ-DE-MD MSA	6,329,118; 107,131 (MD)	Cecil County, Maryland	107,131	Wilmington, DE-MD-NJ MD	782,812; 107,131 (MD)
Philadelphia-Reading-Camden, PA-NJ-DE-MD CSA	7,493,171; 107,131 (MD)	Philadelphia-Camden-Wilmington, PA-NJ-DE-MD MSA	6,329,118; 107,131 (MD)	Salem County, New Jersey	66,280	Wilmington, DE-MD-NJ MD	782,812; 107,131 (MD)
Philadelphia-Reading-Camden, PA-NJ-DE-MD CSA	7,493,171; 107,131 (MD)	Reading, PA MSA	440,072	Berks County, Pennsylvania	440,072	none	
Philadelphia-Reading-Camden, PA-NJ-DE-MD CSA	7,493,171; 107,131 (MD)	Atlantic City-Hammonton, NJ MSA	372,047	Atlantic County, New Jersey	278,657	none	
Philadelphia-Reading-Camden, PA-NJ-DE-MD CSA	7,493,171; 107,131 (MD)	Atlantic City-Hammonton, NJ MSA	372,047	Cape May County, New Jersey	93,390	none	
Philadelphia-Reading-Camden, PA-NJ-DE-MD CSA	7,493,171; 107,131 (MD)	Dover, DE MSA	194,786	Kent County, Delaware	194,786	none	
Philadelphia-Reading-Camden, PA-NJ-DE-MD CSA	7,493,171; 107,131 (MD)	Vineland, NJ MSA	157,148	Cumberland County, New Jersey	157,148	none	
none		Cumberland, MD-WV μSA	93,640; 66,848 (MD)	Allegany County, Maryland	66,848	none	
none		Cumberland, MD-WV μSA	93,640; 66,848 (MD)	Mineral County, West Virginia	26,792	none	
none		none		Caroline County, Maryland	34,116	none	
none		none		Garrett County, Maryland	28,370	none	
none		none		Kent County, Maryland	19,565	none	
State of Maryland					6,265,347	none	

The 10 core-based statistical areas of the State of Maryland (Note: For CBSAs comprising populations from multiple states, they are listed twice to show both their intrastate population within that CBSA as well as the CBSA's total population. Only the intrastate population is ranked.)
2025 rank	Core-based statistical area	Population				
2025 rank	Core-based statistical area	2025 estimate	Change	2020 Census	Change	2010 Census
1	Baltimore-Columbia-Towson, MD MSA	2,857,781	+0.47%	2,844,510	+4.94%	2,710,489
2	Washington-Arlington-Alexandria, DC-VA-MD-WV MSA (MD)	2,524,432	+2.30%	2,467,596	+11.40%	2,215,133
3	Lexington Park, MD MSA	211,176	+2.23%	206,560	+6.54%	193,888
4	Hagerstown-Martinsburg, MD-WV MSA (MD)	157,731	+1.96%	154,705	+4.93%	147,430
5	Salisbury, MD MSA	131,872	+2.86%	128,208	+2.40%	125,203
6	Philadelphia-Camden-Wilmington, PA-NJ-DE-MD MSA (MD)	107,131	+3.28%	103,725	+2.59%	101,108
7	Cumberland, MD-WV μSA (MD)	66,848	−1.85%	68,106	−9.30%	75,087
8	Ocean Pines, MD μSA	54,459	+3.81%	52,460	+1.96%	51,454
9	Easton, MD μSA	38,238	+5.47%	36,254	+8.28%	33,481
10	Cambridge, MD μSA	33,628	+3.37%	32,531	−0.27%	32,618
	Cumberland, MD-WV μSA	93,640	−1.48%	95,044	−7.99%	103,299
	Hagerstown-Martinsburg, MD-WV MSA	315,280	+7.30%	293,844	+9.18%	269,140
	Philadelphia–Camden–Wilmington, PA-NJ-DE-MD MSA	6,329,118	+1.35%	6,245,051	+4.69%	5,965,343
	Washington–Arlington–Alexandria, DC-VA-MD-WV MSA	6,465,724	+2.98%	6,278,542	+13.18%	5,547,495

The three combined statistical areas of the State of Maryland (Note: For CSAs comprising populations from multiple states, they are listed twice to show both their intrastate population within that CSA as well as the CSA's total population. Only the intrastate population is ranked.)
2025 rank	Combined statistical area	Population				
2025 rank	Combined statistical area	2025 estimate	Change	2020 Census	Change	2010 Census
1	Washington-Baltimore-Arlington, DC-MD-VA-WV-PA CSA (MD)	5,822,986	+1.39%	5,743,428	+7.61%	5,337,340
2	Salisbury-Ocean Pines, MD CSA	186,331	+3.13%	180,668	+2.27%	176,657
3	Philadelphia-Reading-Camden, PA-NJ-DE-MD CSA (MD)	107,131	+3.28%	103,725	+2.59%	101,108
	Philadelphia-Reading-Camden, PA-NJ-DE-MD CSA	7,493,171	+1.54%	7,379,700	+4.41%	7,067,807
	Washington-Baltimore-Arlington, DC-MD-VA-WV-PA CSA	10,274,894	+2.46%	10,028,331	+10.17%	9,102,983

== See also ==
- Geography of Maryland
  - Demographics of Maryland
  - List of Maryland locations by per capita income
