= University System of Maryland at Hagerstown =

Regional higher-education center in Hagerstown, Maryland, US

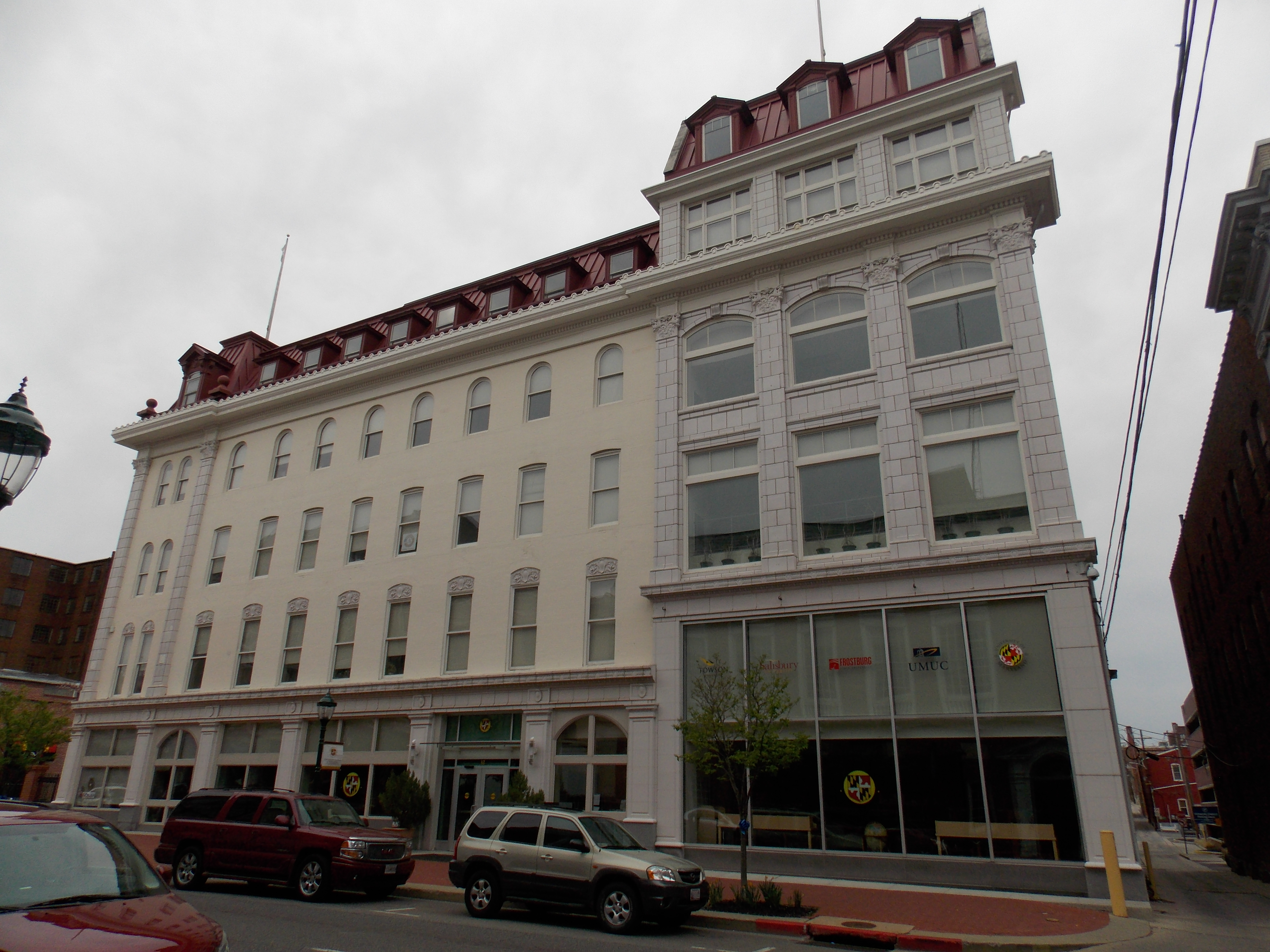
- The old Baldwin House Hotel building along West Washington Street
- Type: Regional higher education center
- Established: January 2005
- Parent institution: University System of Maryland
- Officer in charge: Dr. Jacob Ashby, Executive Director
- Chair: The Honorable Brett R Wilson, Washington County Circuit Court
- Location: Hagerstown, Maryland, United States; 39°38′33″N 77°43′16″W
- Campus: Suburban
- Website: hagerstown.usmd.edu

The University System of Maryland at Hagerstown (USMH) is a facility located in the Commercial Core Historic District in Hagerstown, Maryland, United States. It offers upper-level undergraduate and graduate programs to residents of Hagerstown and its surrounding region and is part of the University System of Maryland.

As part of its mission, USMH works to "develop innovative partnerships with local community colleges, businesses and civic leaders to ensure access and affordability through a seamless and quality learning experience for students in the region."

== Background ==
Recognizing the lack of higher education opportunities in Washington County, Maryland, in 1999, local leaders campaigned to have a new regional center of the University System of Maryland. The new center was targeted for the closed Baldwin House Hotel building in the city's rundown central business district. Hagerstown was eventually selected as the site for the educational facility which opened in 2005.

Built in 1881 the Second Empire style, the Baldwin House Hotel was a four story hotel located at 36-46 West Washington Street. The building stands on the site of two former hotels, the Globe Tavern and the Washington House along the National Pike. The hotel closed in 1914 from fire damage and was later used as retail space.

Dr. Jacob Ashby is the third Executive Director of the center. He follows Mark Halsey (2012–2022) and C. David Warner III (2005–2012) in the role.

== Collaborating institutions ==
The facility offers the ability to enroll in undergraduate programs and graduate programs from University System of Maryland institutions offering bachelor's and master's degrees. Students must first complete two years of study at an accredited academic institution and must apply directly to the school or program of their choice.

- Frostburg State University
- Towson University
- Salisbury University
- University of Maryland Global Campus
- University of Maryland Eastern Shore

Along with Hagerstown Community College, one of USHM's goals is to promote the economic development of Hagerstown and the surrounding community.

== See also ==
- U.S. Route 40 in Maryland
- Hagerstown Community College
