= Mount Washington Arboretum =

Park in Baltimore, United States

Coordinates: 39.36690°N 76.65552°W

Mt. Washington Arboretum
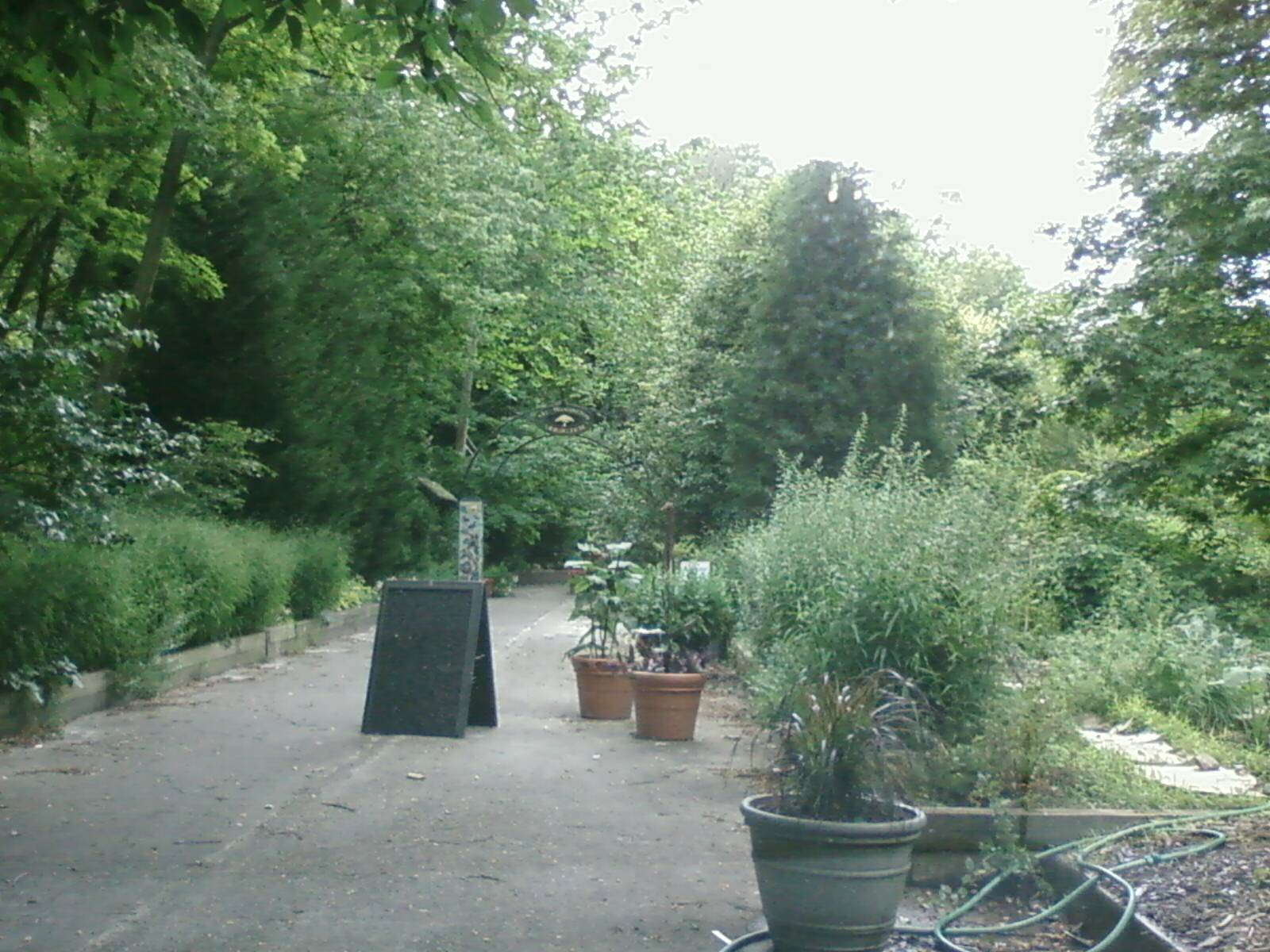
- Entrance to the Mt. Washington Arboretum
- Interactive map of Mt. Washington Arboretum
- Location: Baltimore
- Area: 1 acre (4,000 m^{2})
- Created: 1999
- Operator: Volunteers of Mt. Washington Preservation Trust
- Website: www.miniarboretum.org

The Mt. Washington Arboretum is a 1-acre (4,000 m^{2}) park with various trees, shrubs, and other plants in the Mt. Washington area of Baltimore.

== History ==
The Mt. Washington Arboretum was founded in 1999. It was built on the site of an apartment complex destroyed during Hurricane David and later condemned.
