= Maryland 529 =

Agency providing college savings plans in Maryland, US

Maryland 529 — formerly College Savings Plans of Maryland — is an independent, non-profit State agency that provides flexible and affordable college and disabilities savings plans in accordance with sections 529 and 529A of the Internal Revenue Code. The two college savings plans help families save for future education expenses and reduce dependence on student loans later.

- The Maryland Senator Edward J. Kasemeyer Prepaid College Trust first opened for enrollment in 1998 and offers affordable and flexible tuition plans and payment options at accredited two-year community colleges and four-year colleges and universities nationwide.
- The Maryland Senator Edward J. Kasemeyer College Investment Plan was launched in 2001 and offers a broad range of investment options managed by T. Rowe Price.

Achieving a Better Life Experience (ABLE) programs are a way to help individuals with disabilities and their families save money and pay for qualified disability-related expenses without jeopardizing state or federal means-tested benefits such as SSI or Medicaid.

- The Maryland ABLE Program launched in November 2017. With Maryland ABLE, you can contribute up to $15,000 per year (or more if the beneficiary is working) to one of three investment options or a cash option, and account growth is tax-free when used for qualified disability expenses.

All plans are overseen by Maryland 529 and its Board. The Board includes 11 members, half of whom are State officials and the other half of whom are public members appointed by Maryland's Governor. Maryland 529's Executive Director is responsible for day-to-day management and oversight of the program managers. The Executive Director reports to the Board.
