= Maryland National Guard Outstanding Soldier/Airman of the Year Ribbon =

Military award

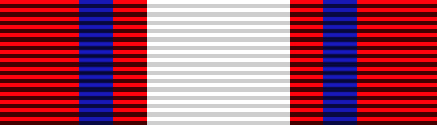

The Maryland National Guard Outstanding Soldier/Airman of the Year Ribbon (formerly the Maryland National Guard Outstanding Soldier/Airman/First Sergeant of the Year Ribbon) is an annual award bestowed upon outstanding individual members of the Maryland Army National Guard or the Maryland Air National Guard.
