= Agriculture in Maryland =

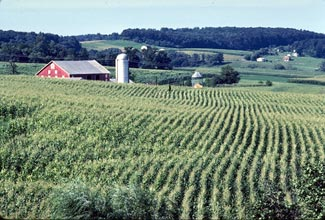
Agriculture is an important part of Maryland's economy.

The US state of Maryland has large areas of fertile agricultural land in its coastal and Piedmont zones, though this land use is being encroached upon by urbanization. Agriculture is oriented to dairy farming (especially in foothill and piedmont areas) for nearby large city milksheads, plus specialty perishable horticulture crops, such as cucumbers, watermelons, sweet corn, tomatoes, melons, squash, and peas (Source:USDA Crop Profiles).

== History ==
Slavery and indentured servitude were critical elements of the development of colonial agriculture in Maryland. The first documented Africans were brought to Maryland in 1642, as 13 slaves at St. Mary's City, the first English settlement in the Province. Slave labor made possible the export-driven plantation economy.

Although many Marylanders believed that slavery could, and should, be abolished, they were slow to achieve it statewide. Although the need for slaves had declined with the shift away from tobacco culture, and slaves were being sold to the Deep South, slavery was still too deeply embedded into Maryland society for the wealthiest whites to give it up voluntarily on a wide scale. Wealthy planters exercised considerable economic and political power in the state. Slavery did not end until after the Civil War.

The southern counties of the western shoreline of Chesapeake Bay are warm enough to support a tobacco cash crop zone, which has existed since early Colonial times, but declined greatly after a state government buy-out in the 1990s.

Modern urban farms have been established in cities like Baltimore.

== Processing ==
There is also a large automated chicken-farming sector in the state's southeastern part; Salisbury is home to Perdue Farms. Maryland's food-processing plants are the most significant type of manufacturing by value in the state.

== Crops ==
=== Strawberries ===
In 2017 a total of 210 acres (85 ha) was grown. This crop is grown in all counties and the City of Baltimore.

Gray Mold (Botrytis cinerea) is a common problem as it is around the world. Fernández-Ortuño et al., 2014 finds populations here have resistance to fludioxonil and to thiophanate-methyl. Many are multiresistant.

Hu et al., also find widespread resistance to SDHIs here. They find several etiologies, with various sdhB alleles producing the resistance. H272R resistance to boscalid, H272R or H272Y multiresistance to boscalid and to penthiopyrad, H272Y resistance to boscalid, fluxapyroxad, and penthiopyrad, and P225F or N230I resistance to boscalid, to fluopyram, fluxapyroxad, and penthiopyrad. There appears to be no resistance to benzovindiflupyr here. This is because it is a new substance.

Much of the phytoplasma research here in the 1990s was conducted by the Jomantiene group at USDA ARS Beltsville. This includes the first detection of both Clover Yellow Edge and STRAWB2 in this crop here. This is also the first report of STRAWB2 anywhere outside of Florida.

Black Root Rot is common here. This is a disease with an uncertain etiology thought to involve several combined pathogens.

== Issues ==
Agriculture in Maryland faces significant challenges from pollution and climate change.

=== Pests ===
Farming suffers from weeds as anywhere else, including an unusual multiply resistant ragweed (Ambrosia artemisiifolia) found by Rousonelos et al., 2012 with both ALS- and PPO-resistances and which by 2016 had developed a third, EPSP resistance. This ragweed population is a drag on soybean cultivation and, as of May 7, 2022, is the worst multiresistant weed problem in the state.

== See also ==
- Slavery in Maryland
