= Hagerstown Community College =

Community college in Hagerstown, Maryland, U.S.

- Type: Public community college
- Established: 1946
- Academic affiliations: Space-grant
- President: James S. Klauber, Ph.D.
- Location: Hagerstown, Maryland, United States; 39°37′49″N 77°40′6″W
- Mascot: Hawks
- Website: Official website

Hagerstown Community College (HCC) is a public community college in Hagerstown, Maryland. It was founded in 1946 as Maryland’s first community college. The campus encompassed eighteen buildings on 319 acres (129 ha). The college hosts a business incubator, outdoor gardens, and an amphitheater.

== Background ==
Hagerstown Community College was founded in September 1946 as Hagerstown Junior College. It was the first community college in Maryland. At first, all of its classes were held in the evening at Hagerstown High School, with the majority of the students veterans of World War II studying on the G.I. Bill.

In 1956, the college expanded to a new facility on the campus of South Hagerstown High School. This location, nicknamed the "Cracker Box" would prove too small for the expanding enrollment of the school. In 1965, construction started on a new campus on Robinwood Drive, with classes starting there in 1966. At this time enrollment had grown to 782 students.

In 1998, the name of the school changed to Hagerstown Community College. Currently, 5000 students are enrolled on the 319 acres (129 ha).

Atlee Kepler was appointed dean of the college in 1953 and president in 1961. Norman Shea served as president from 1986 to 2002; Guy Altieri served from 2003 through 2017. Jim Klauber became the fourth president in June 2018.

Along with USM Hagerstown, one of HCC's goals is to promote the economic development of Hagerstown and the surrounding community.

== Academics ==
The school a two-year public community college offering both transfer and career-oriented programs, as well as continuing education classes. Its accreditation is through the Middle States Commission on Higher Education and has maintained that status since 1968. The college is a member of the American Association of Community Colleges.

HCC offers more than one hundred programs of study and awards associate degrees, certificates and letters of recognition. The college's incubator is meant to spur investment in the local community.

The school held its first graduation in 1948 awarding twenty-five degrees. Since then, the school has had more than 175,000 students.

== See also ==
- University System of Maryland at Hagerstown
