= Maryland Academy of Technology and Health Sciences =

Location
- 2801 N Dukeland St; Baltimore, Maryland 21216; United States; 39°19′5″N 76°39′51.8″W

Information
- School type: Charter school
- Motto: Existo * Praesto * Vigeo
- Opened: 2006
- Closed: 2018
- School district: Baltimore City Public Schools
- Director: Rebekah Ghosh
- Principal: Charles L. Spain, Jr.
- Grades: 6-12
- Colors: Khaki, navy blue(MIDDLE SCHOOL); white and black(HIGH SCHOOL)
- Mascot: Mighty Panthers
- Team name: Panthers
- Newspaper: The Panther Press
- Website: www.baltimorecityschools.org/Page/10034

Maryland Academy of Technology and Health Sciences (MATHS) was a public charter school in Baltimore, Maryland, United States that opened in 2006 and closed in 2016. The school was open to all students, did not charge tuition and provided a comprehensive college preparatory education for students in grades 6 through 12. There was an emphasis on preparing students for future careers in biotechnology and health sciences. The school was funded by the state of Maryland and was founded by Rebekah Ghosh in an effort to help the city's faltering graduation rates and better prepare students for solid careers.
