= Maryland Sister States Program =

International cooperation program

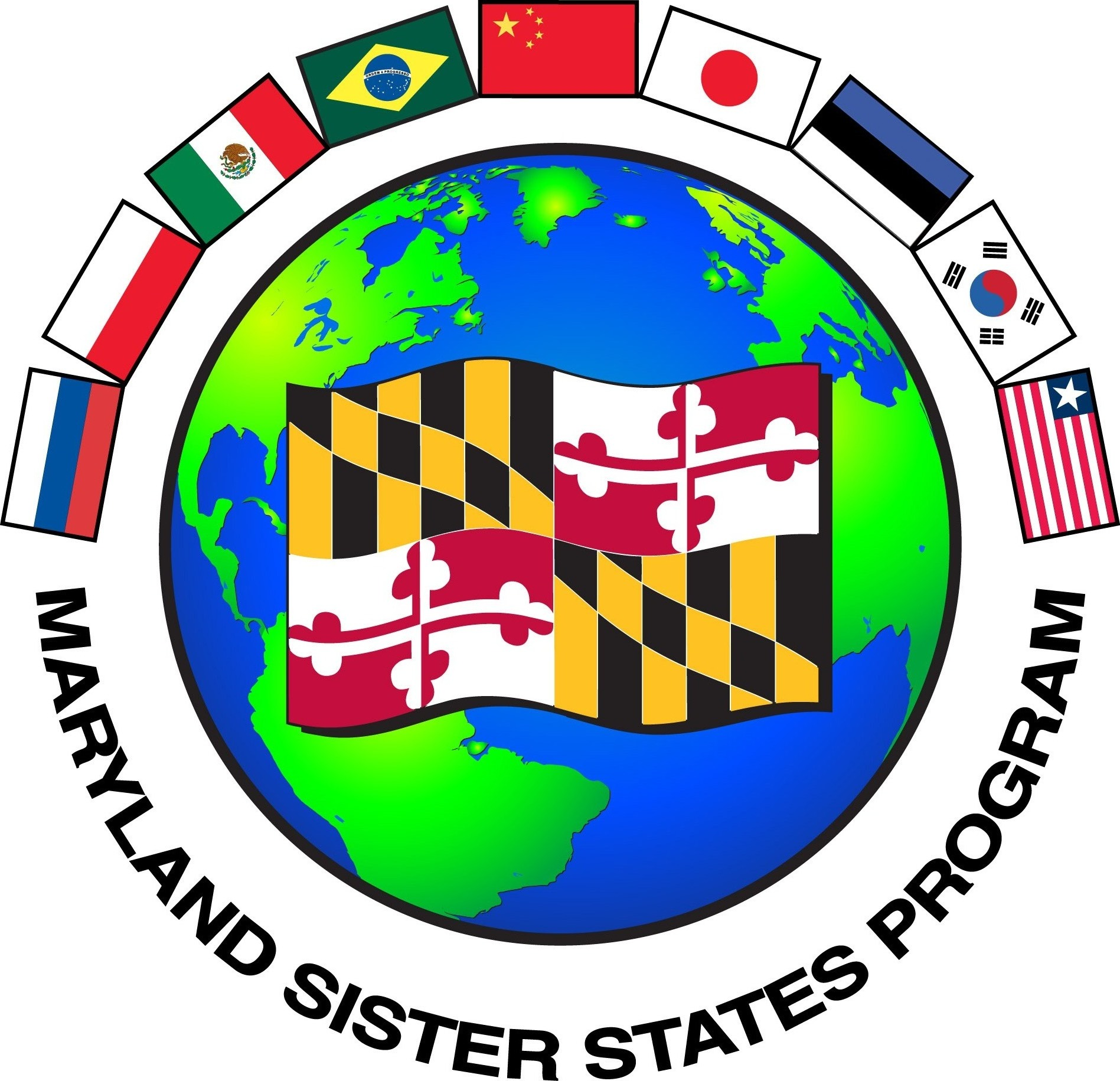
Maryland Sister States Program Logo

The Maryland Sister States Program was established in 1980 to provide a forum for the promotion of international cooperation and understanding. Through broad-based citizen participation in a wide variety of exchanges in areas of mutual interest, the Sister States Program offers opportunities to develop partnership around the world in art, culture, transportation, film, women's issues, business, education, health care, professional development, sports, law, and more.

In 2004, the program was transferred to the Office of Secretary of State of Maryland.

== Active Sister State relationships ==
The Maryland Sister States Program currently includes currently includes 20 relationships in 17 countries.

- 1980 Anhui Province, China
- 1981 Kanagawa Prefecture, Japan
- 1981 Nord-Pas de Calais, France
- 1981 Walloon Region, Belgium
- 1991 Gyeongsangnam-do, Korea
- 1993 Leningrad Oblast/City of St. Petersburg, Russia
- 1993 State of Jalisco, Mexico
- 1993 Łódź Region, Poland
- 1999 State of Rio de Janeiro, Brazil
- 2007 Bong & Maryland Counties, Liberia
- 2009 Harju County, Estonia
- 2011 Ninh Thuan Province, Vietnam
- 2012 Kocaeli Municipality, Turkey
- 2013 County Cork, Ireland
- 2013 Ondo and Cross River States, Nigeria
- 2015 KwaZulu-Natal, South Africa
- 2016 Negev Administrative District, Israel
- 2017 Jeollanam-Do, Korea

== Sister Cities International membership ==
Through partnership between U.S. and international communities, Sister Cities International and its members act as citizen diplomats building global cooperation at the municipal level, promoting cultural understanding and stimulating economic development.
