= List of former Maryland state highways =

There are six lists of former Maryland state highways split by number ranges:

- List of former Maryland state highways (2–199)
- List of former Maryland state highways (200–399)
- List of former Maryland state highways (400–499)
- List of former Maryland state highways (500–599)
- List of former Maryland state highways (600–699)
- List of former Maryland state highways (700–999)

== See also ==
- List of Maryland state highways
