= Electoral reform in Maryland =

Electoral reform in Maryland refers to efforts, proposals and plans to change the election and voting laws in Maryland. In 2007, Maryland became the first U.S. state to join the National Popular Vote Interstate Compact. Bills have also been introduced to implement instant runoff voting (IRV) statewide, but they have failed, largely due to legislators' concerns about complicating the election process and causing technical problems similar to those encountered by Florida during the 2000 U.S. Presidential election. However, Takoma Park, Maryland adopted IRV in 2006 after it won 84% approval in an advisory ballot measure on November 8, 2005. Maryland is the home of the electoral reform organization Fairvote. In 2007, Maryland's Board of Elections Administrator, Linda Lamone, was quoted in Diebold advertising literature.

== Ballot access ==
Party certifications are done for each gubernatorial cycle (e.g. 2006–2010). If the number of registered voters to a political party is less than 1%, then 10,000 petition signatures must be gathered for that party to be considered certified. A party must be certified before voters can register under that party. A party can also be certified for a two-year term if their candidate receives more than 1% of the vote. Reformers would like to see the ballot access laws loosened.

== See also ==
Electoral reform in the United States
