= List of school districts in Maryland =

This is a list of school districts in Maryland.

Each of the following parallel the boundary of one of the counties of Maryland, and all of them are dependent on county and independent city governments. Maryland does not have independent school district governments.

- Allegany County Public Schools
- Anne Arundel County Public Schools
- Baltimore City Public Schools
- Baltimore County Public Schools
- Calvert County Public Schools
- Caroline County Public Schools
- Carroll County Public Schools
- Cecil County Public Schools
- Charles County Public Schools
- Dorchester County Public Schools
- Frederick County Public Schools
- Garrett County Public Schools
- Harford County Public Schools
- Howard County Public Schools
- Kent County Public Schools
- Montgomery County Public Schools
- Prince George's County Public Schools
- Queen Anne's County Public Schools
- Saint Mary's County Public Schools
- Somerset County Public Schools
- Talbot County Public Schools
- Washington County Public Schools
- Wicomico County Public Schools
- Worcester County Public Schools

== See also ==
- List of high schools in Maryland
