= Maryland BayStat =

Maryland BayStat is a program for assessment, coordination and reporting of statewide Chesapeake Bay restoration efforts, created by an executive order from Governor Martin O'Malley in February 2007.

The BayStat team, which includes the Governor, Secretaries of the Maryland Departments of Agriculture, Environment, Natural Resources and Planning, scientists from the University of Maryland and other key staff of state agencies, meets on a monthly basis to assess progress and adapt efforts.

Access to various bay health tracking tools is available on the BayStat website, providing visitors with current information on the health of the bay. The site includes a variety of tools providing online access to real-time Chesapeake Bay water quality monitoring graphs. Interactive maps on the BayStat website show pollution sources in Maryland, as well as Maryland's progress towards its Tributary Strategy Goal and 2-year Milestone.
