= Mount Hope College (Maryland) =

Defunct college in Maryland, US

Mount Hope College was a college located along the outer limits of Baltimore, Maryland. The first president of the institution was Frederick Hall, a Presbyterian clergyman who had previously operated a school at the same location. It operated from 1833 until 1844.
