= List of National Park System areas in Maryland =

This list of National Park System areas in Maryland includes the lands, trails, or park networks maintained by the National Park Service of the United States within the U.S. State of Maryland. The National Park Service controls 24 units in the state of Maryland. They range from sites of historical interest to sites of ecological interest to portions of the parkway system around Washington, DC. Many of the sites currently under the control of the National Park Service in Maryland were previously under the control of other agencies in the federal government, such as Antietam National Battlefield, which was originally managed by the Department of War. There are eight units administered by the National Park System as part of the National Capital Parks. The most recent unit created in Maryland is the Captain John Smith Chesapeake National Historic Trail, which was authorized by Congress in 2006.

== National Park System areas ==
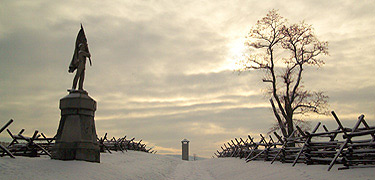
A view of Antietam National Battlefield, site of one of the bloodiest battles of the American Civil War

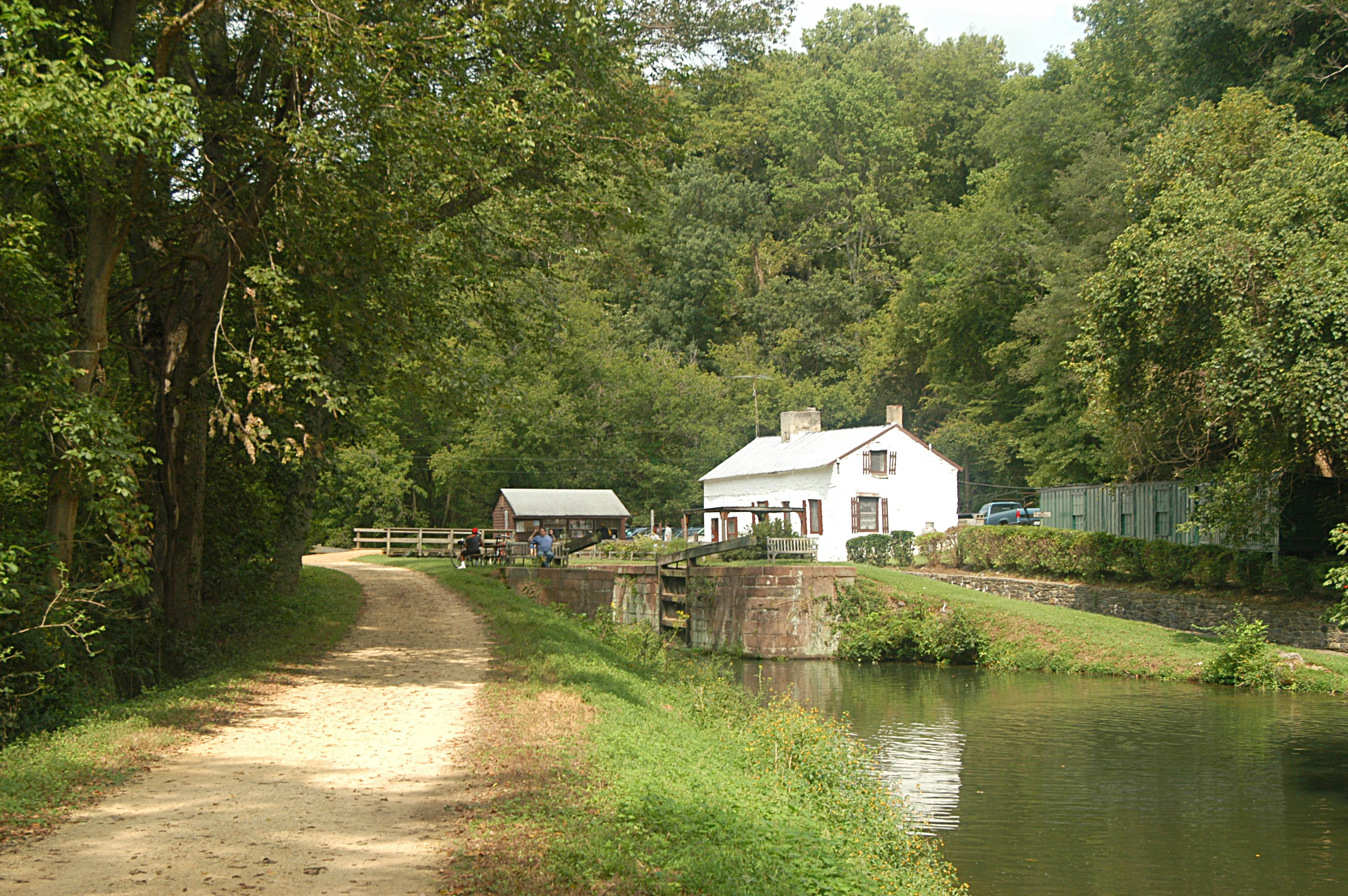
The C&O Canal at Swain's Lock. The canal runs between Washington, DC and Cumberland, Maryland.

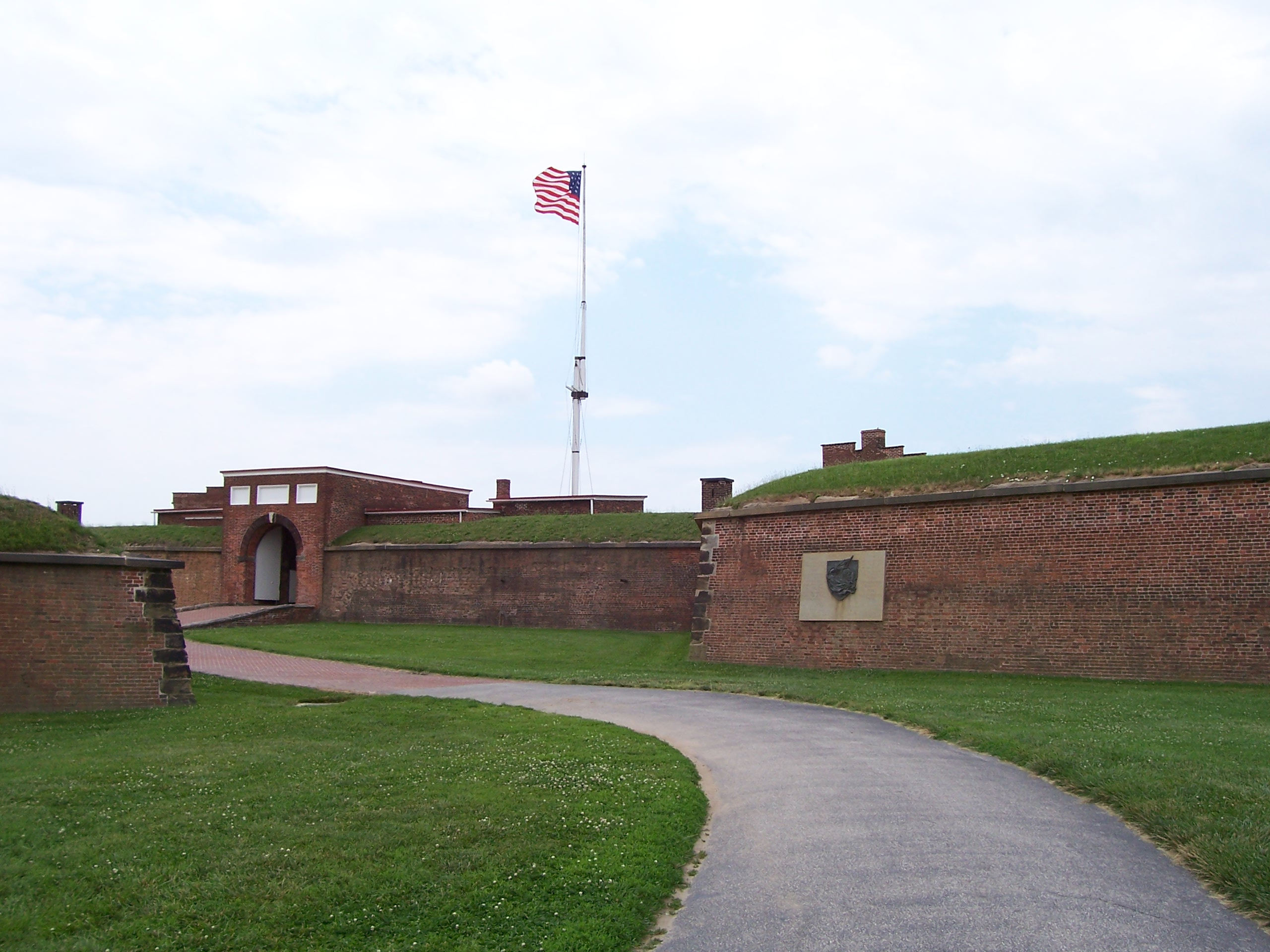
The sally port, or main entrance, to Fort McHenry in Baltimore. The Battle of Fort McHenry in the War of 1812 inspired Francis Scott Key to write the Star Spangled Banner.

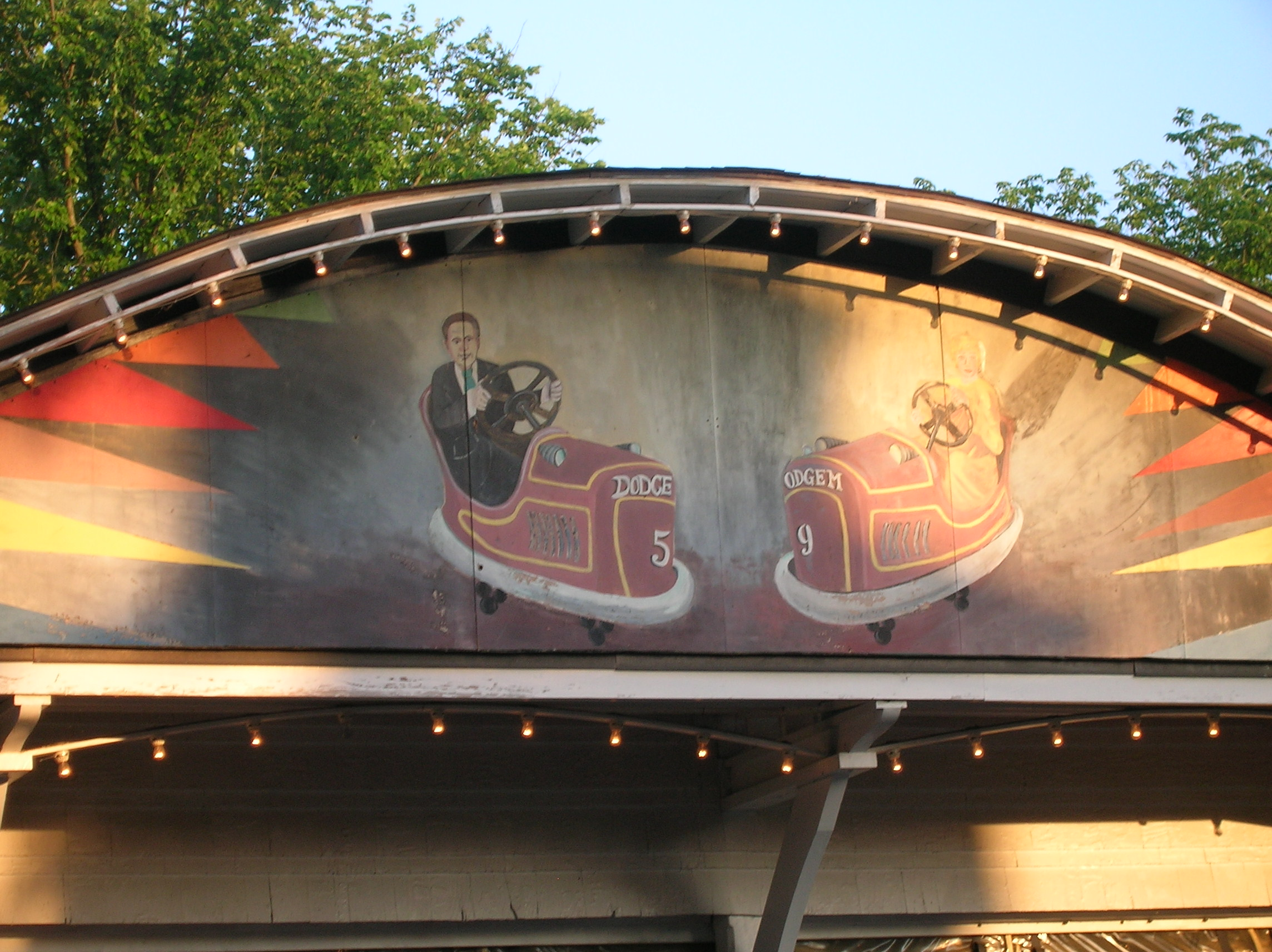
Close-up view of sign on the former bumper car pavilion at Glen Echo Park

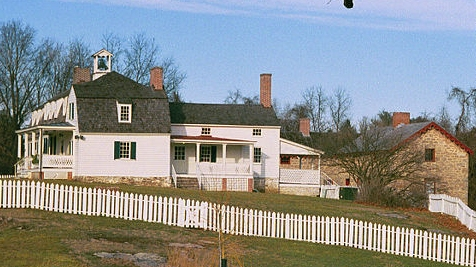
Farmhouse and slave quarters at Hampton National Historic Site. Photo by James G. Howes.

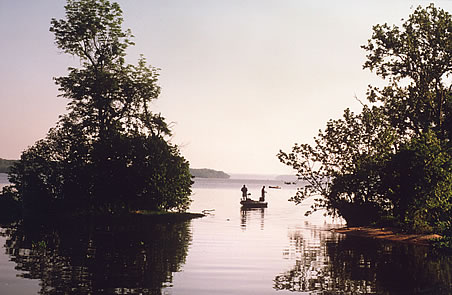
View of the Potomac River at Piscataway Park

Haberdaventure, the home of Thomas Stone, a signer of the Declaration of Independence, centerpiece of the Thomas Stone National Historic Site.

Name	Location	Description	Established	Notes
Antietam National Battlefield	Washington County	Site of the Battle of Antietam (Civil War)	1890^{[B]}	
Appalachian National Scenic Trail	Washington County	2,175 mi (3,500 km) footpath stretching through 14 eastern states from Maine to Georgia.	1970	
Assateague Island National Seashore	Worcester County	37 mi (60 km) long barrier island managed to conserve its plants and animals.	1965	
Baltimore–Washington Parkway^{[A]}	Anne Arundel and Prince George's Counties	29 mi (47 km) highway connecting Washington, DC with Baltimore, Maryland.	1954	
Captain John Smith Chesapeake National Historic Trail	Chesapeake Bay	Water trail tracing Smith's explorations of the Chesapeake Bay, accessible from many points on Maryland's Chesapeake shoreline.	2006	
Catoctin Mountain Park	Frederick County	5,810-acre (23.5 km^{2}) forest park in the Appalachian Mountains.	1954	
Chesapeake and Ohio Canal National Historical Park	Montgomery, Frederick, Washington, and Allegany Counties	Park paralleling the Potomac River, preserving remains of the Chesapeake and Ohio Canal.	1938	
Chesapeake Bay Gateways Network	Chesapeake Bay shoreline	Network of sites of historic and environmental interest across the Chesapeake Bay watershed.	1998	
Clara Barton National Historic Site	Montgomery County	Home of Clara Barton (1821–1912), the founder of the American Red Cross.	1975	
Fort Foote Park^{[A]}	Prince George's County	Wood and earthwork fort on the Potomac River that formed part of Washington, DC's military defenses in the Civil War era.	c. 1946	
Fort McHenry National Monument and Historic Shrine	Baltimore City	Star-shaped fort that successfully defended Baltimore Harbor from an attack by the British navy during the War of 1812, in the battle that inspired Francis Scott Key to write The Star-Spangled Banner.	1925	
Fort Washington Park^{[A]}	Prince George's County	Had a long history of military use as a defensive fort protecting Washington, DC	1946	
George Washington Memorial Parkway	Montgomery County	Parkway in Virginia and Washington, DC; the short Clara Barton Parkway section connects to Glen Echo Park and the Clara Barton National Historic Site in Maryland	1930	
Glen Echo Park	Montgomery County	Park was first established in 1891 as a National Chautauqua Assembly; later it became an amusement park, which closed in 1968.	1971	
Greenbelt Park^{[A]}	Prince George's County	A 1,176-acre (476 ha) recreational area within an urban environment.	1950	
Hampton National Historic Site	Baltimore County	18th century estate including Georgian manor house, gardens and grounds, and original stone slave quarters	1948	
Harmony Hall^{[A]}	Prince George's County	18th-century country house surrounded by 65 acres (26 ha) of parkland.	1966	
Monocacy National Battlefield	Frederick County	Civil War battlefield straddling the Monocacy River southwest of Frederick.	1976	
Oxon Cove Park and Oxon Hill Farm^{[A]}	Prince George's County	Located in Washington, DC and Prince George's County, Maryland, Oxon Cove Park provides recreational activities.	1959	
Piscataway Park^{[A]}	Prince George's County	Across the Potomac River from Mount Vernon, established to protect the view from Mount Vernon.	1961	
Potomac Heritage National Scenic Trail	Potomac River shoreline	Network of trails along the Potomac River and its tributaries, from the mouth of the river near St. Mary's County to the headwaters.	1983	
Suitland Parkway^{[A]}	Prince George's County	9.35 mi (15 km) historic parkway built during World War II to connect Washington, DC-area military facilities	1944	
Thomas Stone National Historic Site	Charles County	Home and estate of Thomas Stone, a signer of the Declaration of Independence	1978	

== See also ==
- List of Maryland state parks
- List of National Historic Landmarks in Maryland

== Notes ==
A Part of the National Capital Parks.
B Antietam National Battlefield was originally two separate units, a cemetery established in 1865 and the battlefield established in 1890 under the War department. Both the battlefield and the cemetery were transferred to the National Park Service from the War Department in 1933, and the two units were combined in 1974.
