= List of sister cities in Maryland =

This is a list of sister states, regions, and cities in the U.S. state of Maryland. Sister cities, known in Europe as town twins, are cities which partner with each other to promote human contact and cultural links, although this partnering is not limited to cities and often includes counties, regions, states and other sub-national entities.

Many Maryland jurisdictions partner with foreign cities through Sister Cities International, an organization whose goal is to, "Promote peace through mutual respect, understanding, and cooperation." The first sister city relationship in Maryland, however, was between Salisbury, Maryland and Salisbury, England, and predated Sister Cities International. Sister cities interact with each other across a broad range of activities, from health care and education to business and the arts. The partnerships in this list vary in how formalized their relationships are. Recently, a number of Maryland cities have partnered with cities in Estonia through a program developed by the Maryland National Guard after Estonia gained its independence from the Soviet Union.

== Sister states, regions and cities of Maryland ==
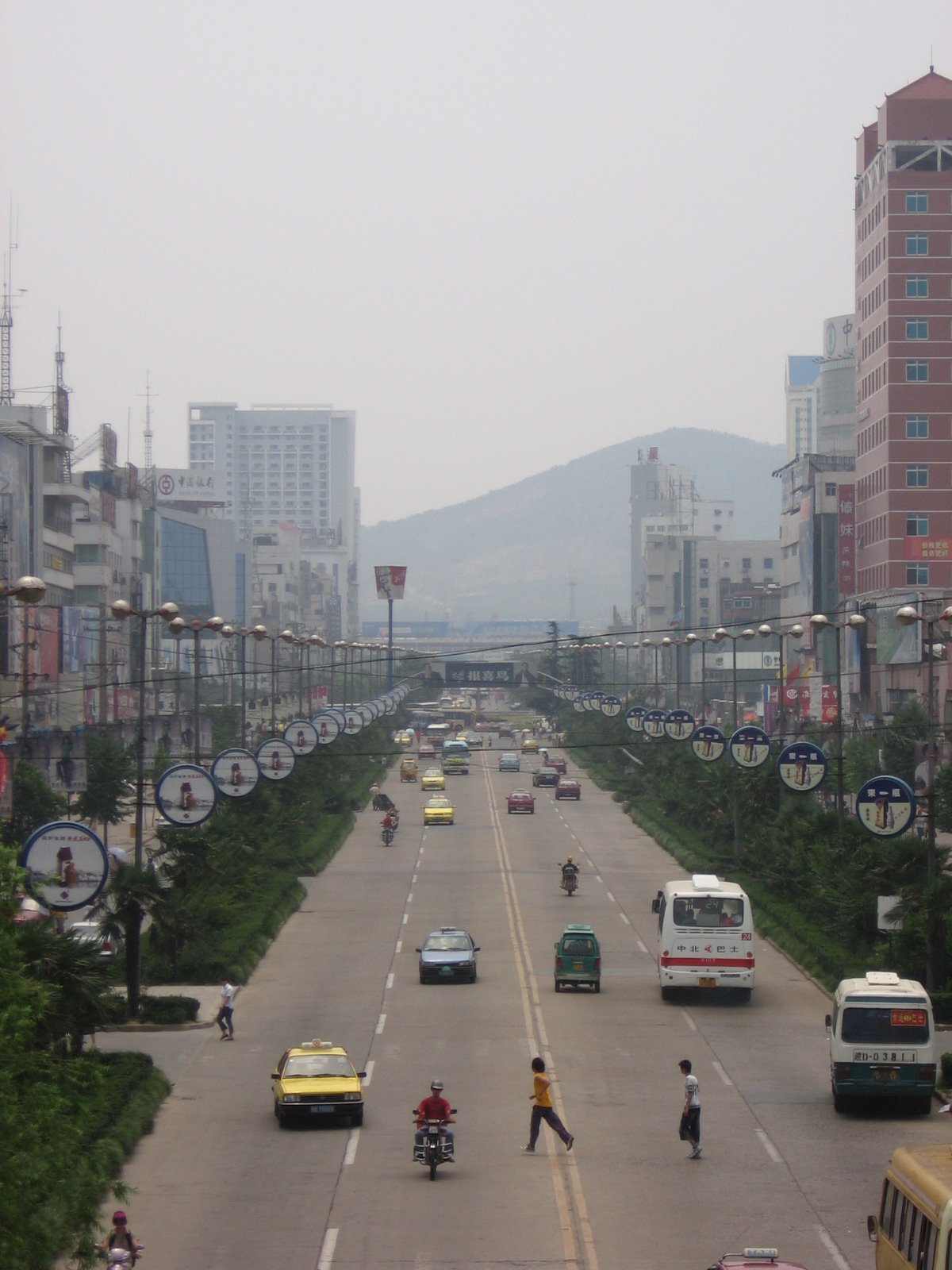
A major street in the city of Huainan, northern Anhui Province, one of Maryland's sister regions.

Maryland jurisdiction	Sister state, region, or city	Country	Since	References
State of Maryland	Anhui Province	China	1980	
State of Maryland	Tartu	Estonia	2003	
State of Maryland	Gyeongsangnam-do Province	South Korea	1991	
State of Maryland	Jalisco State	Mexico	1993	
State of Maryland	Kanagawa Prefecture	Japan	1981	
State of Maryland	Bong County	Liberia	2007	
State of Maryland	Maryland County	Liberia	2007	
State of Maryland	Łódź Voivodeship	Poland	1993	
State of Maryland	Nord-Pas de Calais	France	1981	
State of Maryland	State of Rio de Janeiro	Brazil	1999	
State of Maryland	Saint Petersburg; Leningrad Oblast	Russia	1993	
State of Maryland	Wallonia Region	Belgium	1989	
State of Maryland	County Cork	(Republic of Ireland) Ireland		

== Sister cities of Maryland cities and counties ==
Maryland jurisdiction	Sister state, region, or city	Country	Since	References
Annapolis	Annapolis Royal, Nova Scotia	Canada	1980	
Annapolis	Changsha, China	China		
Annapolis	Dumfries, Dumfries and Galloway	Scotland, UK	1987	
Annapolis	Newport	Wales, UK	1982	
Annapolis	Niterói, Rio de Janeiro	Brazil	1982	
Annapolis	Tallinn, Harju County	Estonia	1999	
Annapolis	Wexford, County Wexford	(Republic of Ireland) Ireland	1993	
Annapolis	Frankston, Australia	Australia	2025	
Baltimore	Alexandria, Alexandria Governorate	Egypt	1995	
Baltimore	Ashkelon, Southern District	Israel	2005	
Baltimore	Changwon	South Korea	2018	
Baltimore	Gbarnga, Bong County	Liberia	1973	
Baltimore	Genoa, Liguria	Italy	1985	
Baltimore	Kawasaki, Kanagawa Prefecture	Japan	1978	
Baltimore	Luxor, Luxor Governorate	Egypt	1981	
Baltimore	Odesa, Odesa Oblast	Ukraine	1974	
Baltimore	Piraeus, Attica	Greece	1982	
Baltimore	Rotterdam, South Holland	Netherlands	1985	
Baltimore	Xiamen, Fujian	China	1985	
Charles County	Jõgeva, Jõgeva County	Estonia	2012	
Charles County	Walldorf, Baden-Württemberg	Germany	2002	
Columbia	Cergy-Pontoise, Île-de-France	France	1977	
Columbia	Tres Cantos, Community of Madrid	Spain	1990	
Cumberland	Tapa, Lääne-Viru County	Estonia	2000	
District Heights	Mbuji-Mayi, Kasai-Oriental Province	(Democratic Republic of the Congo) DR Congo	2008	
District Heights	Thomonde, Centre	Haiti		
Frederick	Aquiraz, Ceará	Brazil	2006	
Frederick	Mörzheim, Landau, Rhineland-Palatinate	Germany	1982	
Frederick	Schifferstadt, Rhineland-Palatinate	Germany	1982	
Frostburg	Viljandi, Viljandi County	Estonia	2000	
Grantsville	Tõrva, Valga County	Estonia	2000	
Hagerstown	Wesel, North Rhine-Westphalia	Germany	1952	
Havre de Grace	Sillamäe, Ida-Viru County	Estonia	2000	
McHenry	Otepää, Valga County	Estonia	2000	
Montgomery County	Gondar, Amhara	Ethiopia		
Montgomery County	Morazán Department	El Salvador	2011	
Oakland	Tőrca, Valga County	Estonia		
Oakland	Valga, Valga County	Estonia	2000	
Ocean City	Finale Ligure, Liguria	Italy	1996	
Ocean City	Pärnu, Pärnu County	Estonia	2003	
Prince George's County	Rishon Le Zion, Central District	Israel	1990	
Prince George's County	Royal Bafokeng Nation, North West Province	South Africa	1998	
Prince George's County	Ziguinchor, Casamance	Senegal	1987	
Riverdale Park	Ipala, Chiquimula	Guatemala	2008	
Rockville	Jiaxing, Zhejiang ("friendly" relations)	China	2008	
Rockville	Pinneberg, Schleswig-Holstein	Germany	1957	
Rockville	Yilan City, Yilan County	Taiwan	2019	
Salisbury	Salisbury, Wiltshire	England, UK	1932	
Salisbury	Tartu, Tartu County	Estonia	1999	
Salisbury	Salinas, Santa Elena	Ecuador	2017	
Westminster	Paide, Järva County	Estonia	2002	
