= Big Run State Park =

State park in Garrett County, Maryland

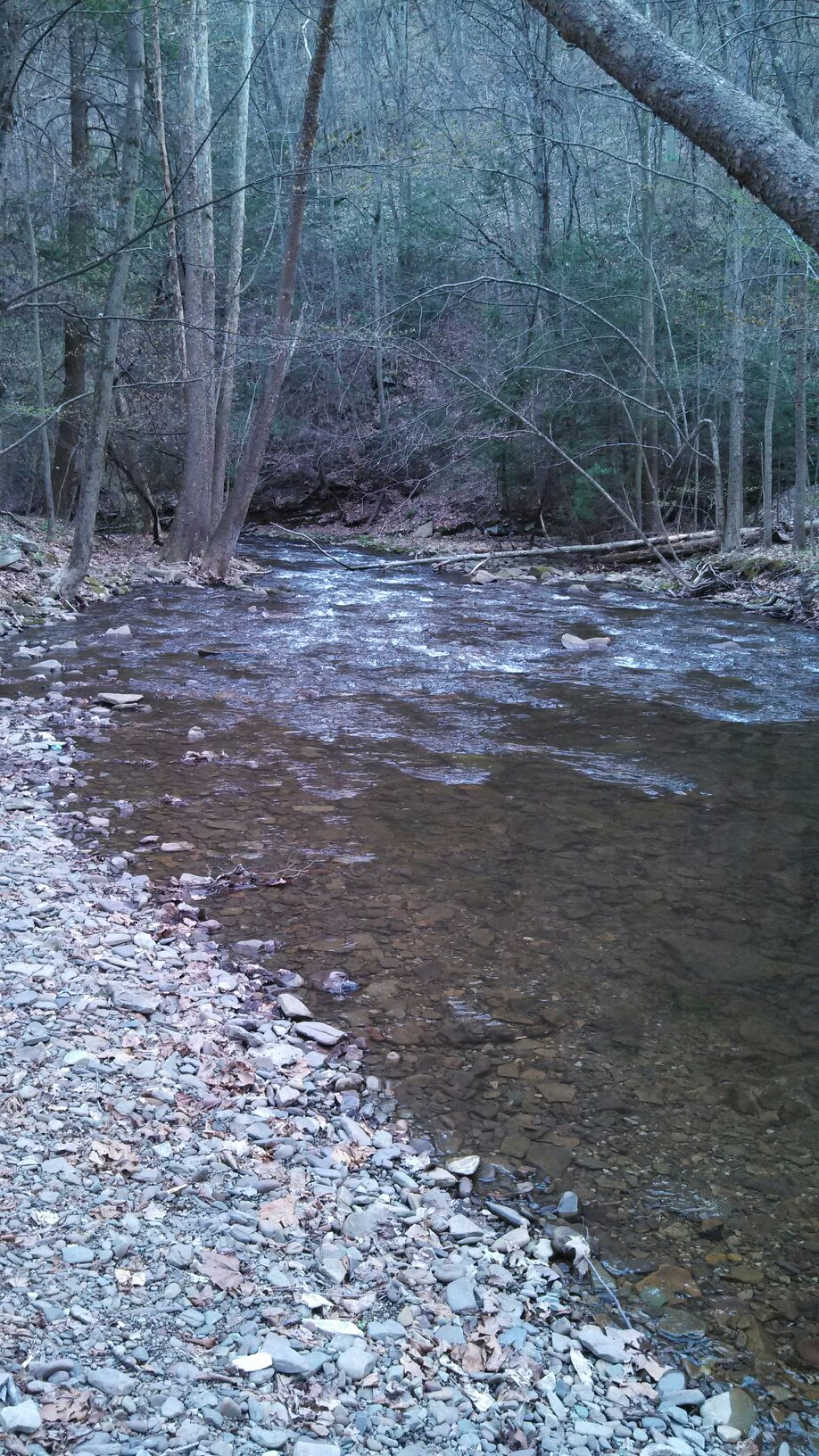
- Big Run

- Location within Maryland
- Interactive map of Big Run State Park
- Location: Garrett County, Maryland, United States
- Nearest town: Westernport, Maryland
- Coordinates: 39°32′58″N 79°08′40″W
- Area: 300 acres (120 ha)
- Elevation: 1,522 ft (464 m)
- Established: 1930s
- Administrator: Maryland Department of Natural Resources
- Designation: Maryland state park
- Website: Official website

Big Run State Park is a Maryland state park located at the northern end of the Savage River Reservoir, an impoundment of the Savage River, in Garrett County, Maryland. The park occupies 300 acres (120 ha) in Savage River State Forest and encompasses the confluence of Monroe Run and Big Run. Park activities include boating, fishing, hiking, picknicking, and camping.

== History ==
The park originated as the 50-acre (20 ha) Big Run Recreation Area, one of several Maryland areas that were developed by the Civilian Conservation Corps in the 1930s. In 1952, the Maryland State Planning Commission recommended that the "lightly used" recreation area be expanded to take advantage of its location on the reservoir that had been newly created on the Savage River.

== Ecology ==
Climate

The park's climate is similar to mountain weather; cold winters accompanied by mild, humid summers. The park is located within the Western Appalachian Plateau, which gives rise to colder temperatures. The Savage River Reservoir rests in a canyon that experiences high winds, contributing to the weather changes.

- Average coolest month: January (30-34 °F)
- Average warmest month: July (74-80 °F)
- Average wettest month: May

Wildlife

Red-tailed hawk, broad-winged hawk, great-horned owl, screech owl, songbirds, indigo bunting and other forest interior dwellers can be spotted within Big Run. Black bear, bobcat, white-tailed deer and raccoon are among the park's mammalian inhabitants. Grouse, great blue herons, minks, and ducks may be seen seasonally along the reservoir edge.

Flora

The park's forests contain oak, hickory and native hardwoods. Trout lilies and spring beauties bloom in April, trilliums and lady slippers in the months of May and June, while rhododendrons, bee balm and cardinal flowers bloom in July.

== Activities and amenities ==
The park is accessible on New Germany Road from Interstate 68, Exit 24. It offers primitive campsites, group campsites, youth group campsite, and pavilions. Picnicking facilities are located in the park's day use area. The Savage River Reservoir is used for non-motorized boating, electric motoring, and fishing. Facilities include a boat ramp. Fishermen may find walleye, largemouth bass, crappie, yellow perch, bluegill, suckers and trout. The Monroe Run hiking trail and other trails are accessible from the state park. The adjacent Savage River State Forest has trails for multi-purpose use including snowshoeing or snowmobiling.
