= List of Maryland state parks =

This list of Maryland state parks includes the state parks and state battlefields listed in the Maryland Department of Natural Resources's current acreage report. Generally, the Maryland Park Service, a unit of and under the authority of the Maryland Department of Natural Resources (DNR), is the governing body for these parks, although some have been turned over to local authorities.

== Maryland state parks ==
Maryland State Parks (Hover mouse over pog to popup clickable link)

Name	County	Area		Estab- lished	River / lake / other	Image	Remarks
Name	County	acres	ha	Estab- lished	River / lake / other	Image	Remarks
Assateague State Park	Worcester	855 acres	346 ha	1956	Atlantic Ocean	Horses in marshland	Barrier island with swimming, beachcombing, sunbathing, surfing and fishing
Big Run State Park	Garrett	300 acres	120 ha		Savage River Reservoir	River flowing over rocks	Camping, fishing, flat water canoeing, hiking trails, picnicking
Bill Burton Fishing Pier State Park	Dorchester, Talbot	24 acres	9.7 ha	1987	Choptank River	Riverscape	Fishing, hiking, cycling
Bohemia River State Park	Cecil	466 acres	189 ha	2022	Great Bohemia Creek		Hiking, biking, canoeing, kayaking, wildlife viewing, fishing
Calvert Cliffs State Park	Calvert	1,311 acres	531 ha	1960s	Chesapeake Bay	Cliffs overlooking water	Fossil hunting, hiking trails, fishing, hunting, picnicking, youth group camping, playground, shelters
Casselman River Bridge State Park	Garrett	4 acres	1.6 ha	1957	Casselman River	Single-arch stone bridge over river water	Historic bridge; popular fishing location
Chapel Point State Park	Charles	821 acres	332 ha	1972	Port Tobacco River	Park signage	Largely undeveloped; features fishing and hunting
Chapman State Park	Charles	829 acres	335 ha	1998	Potomac River	Mount Aventine	Home of Mount Aventine; fishing, hunting, hiking trails
Cunningham Falls State Park	Frederick	6,157 acres	2,492 ha	1954	Big Hunting Creek	Water coursing over grey rocks	Includes the Catoctin Furnace; features boating, fishing, swimming, playground, trails, hunting, and picnicking
Cypress Branch State Park	Kent	314 acres	127 ha	2022			Includes a picnic area near a 3-acre fishing pond
Dans Mountain State Park	Allegany	482 acres	195 ha	1970s			Olympic-sized swimming pool with waterslide and refreshment stand; fishing, hiking, picnic areas, playground, pavilions
Deep Creek Lake State Park	Garrett	1,169 acres	473 ha	2000	Deep Creek Lake	Deep Creek Lake State Park Pier	Boating and fishing on Maryland's largest man-made lake, camping, hunting, hiking trails
Elk Neck State Park	Cecil	2,369 acres	959 ha	1936	Chesapeake Bay		Home of Turkey Point Light; beach, picnicking, seasonal convenience store, camping, cabins, nature center, trails for hiking and biking, hunting, various water sports
Fort Frederick State Park	Washington	722 acres	292 ha	1922	Potomac River, Big Pool Lake	Stonewall fortifications	Stone fortification built by colonial Province of Maryland from the French and Indian War (1754-1763); visitors center, picnicking, boating, fishing, hiking, camping
Fort Tonoloway State Park	Washington	26 acres	11 ha				Undeveloped
Franklin Point State Park	Anne Arundel	484 acres	196 ha	1999	Chesapeake Bay		Undeveloped
Freedman's State Park	Montgomery			2026			Previously part of the Patuxent River State Park
Gambrill State Park	Frederick	1,209 acres	489 ha	1934		Pond with trees	Picnicking, hiking, mountain biking, horseback riding, fishing pond, camping
Gathland State Park	Frederick, Washington	144 acres	58 ha	1949		Stone monument	Former estate of George Alfred Townsend; museum, visitors center, picnicking, hiking on the Appalachian Trail
Greenbrier State Park	Frederick, Washington	1,408 acres	570 ha	1964	Greenbrier Lake	Sunset over lake waters	Swimming, fishing, boating, boat rental, camping, camp store, hiking, picnicking, playground, Appalachian Trail
Greenwell State Park	St. Mary's	596 acres	241 ha	1971	Patuxent River	Gray barn	Historic Rosedale Manor House; picnicking, swimming, non-motorized boating, hiking, equestrian and cycling trails, fishing, hunting
Gunpowder Falls State Park	Baltimore, Harford	15,088 acres	6,106 ha	1959	Gunpowder River, Dundee Creek	Red barn	Multiple non-contiguous recreational areas: Picnicking, hiking, biking, horseback riding, cross-country skiing, hunting, various water sports
Hallowing Point Waterfront Park	Calvert	13 acres	5.3 ha	2017	Patuxent River		Opening 2022; on Route 231, on the Calvert County side of the Patuxent River Bridge
Harriet Tubman Underground Railroad State Park	Dorchester	17 acres	6.9 ha	2007		Visitors center	Dedicated to the life and work of abolitionist and Underground Railroad activist Harriet Tubman; opened in 2017
Hart-Miller Island State Park	Baltimore	244 acres	99 ha	1977	Back River; Chesapeake Bay	Dike, Hart-Miller Island State Park	Accessible only by boat; 3,000-foot (910 m) sandy beach
Herrington Manor State Park	Garrett	365 acres	148 ha	1964	Herrington Creek	Park entrance sign	Swimming, non-motorized boating, picnicking, hiking, tennis, volleyball, cabins
Janes Island State Park	Somerset	3,160 acres	1,280 ha	1963	Chesapeake Bay	Waterway	Visitors center, conference center, picnicking, cabins, camping, camp store, various water sports
Love Point State Park	Queen Anne's	76 acres	31 ha	2007	Chesapeake Bay		Undeveloped
Martinak State Park	Caroline	105 acres	42 ha	1961	Choptank River, Watts Creek	Signage and scenery	Fishing, camping, boating, hiking, nature center
Matapeake State Park	Queen Anne's	21 acres	8.5 ha	2009	Chesapeake Bay	Bayscape	Beach; leased by Queen Anne's County
Matthew Henson State Park	Montgomery	100 acres	40 ha	1989		Elevated pathway	Greenway for hiking and biking
New Germany State Park	Garrett	508 acres	206 ha			Lakescape	Swimming, fishing, picnicking, boat launch, boat rental, canoeing, camping, cabins, hiking trail, cross-country skiing, nature center
Newtowne Neck State Park	St. Mary's	794 acres	321 ha	2009	Potomac River	Newtowne Neck State Park, Maryland, USA	Non-motorized boating, hiking, picnicking, fishing
North Point State Park	Baltimore	1,328 acres	537 ha	1987	Back River, Patapsco River, Chesapeake Bay	Elevated pathway	Former site of the Bay Shore Amusement Park; visitors center, swimming, hiking and biking trails, pier and shore fishing, picnicking
Palmer State Park	Harford	590 acres	240 ha	1965	Deer Creek		Undeveloped; hiking, fishing, canoeing
Patapsco Valley State Park	Anne Arundel, Baltimore, Carroll, Howard	14,296 acres	5,785 ha	1907	Upper Patapsco River	Curving, multi-arched bridge	Hiking, horseback and mountain bike trails, picnicking, canoeing, fishing, camping, historical touring
Patuxent River State Park	Howard, Montgomery	6,703 acres	2,713 ha	1963	Patuxent River	Stone building	Hunting, fishing, hiking and horseback riding
Pocomoke River State Park	Worcester	916 acres	371 ha	1939	Pocomoke River	Riverscape	Visitors center, swimming pool, biking and hiking trails, boat launch, boat rental, fishing, flat water canoeing, camping, camp store, picnicking
Point Lookout State Park	St. Mary's	1,083 acres	438 ha	1963	Chesapeake Bay, Potomac River	Tall monument	American Civil War prisoner-of-war camp museum/Marshland Nature Center, swimming, picnicking, boat launch, boat rental, camping, cabins, camp store, fishing, canoeing, hiking trails, hunting
Rocks State Park	Harford	1,060 acres	430 ha	1949	Deer Creek	Rocky outcroppings	Fishing, hiking, picnicking, wading, canoeing and tubing, bow hunting, rock climbing, repelling
Rocky Gap State Park	Allegany	3,119 acres	1,262 ha	1963	Lake Habeeb	Lake Habeeb	Boating, camping, fishing, hiking
Rosaryville State Park	Prince George's	1,227 acres	497 ha	1976			Mount Airy Mansion; trails for hiking, biking and equestrians
Sandy Point State Park	Anne Arundel	786 acres	318 ha	1948	Chesapeake Bay	Thin peninsula and blue waters	Swimming, fishing, crabbing, boating, picnicking, windsurfing
Sang Run State Park	Garrett	264 acres	107 ha	2017			1800s homestead and store
Savage Highlands State Park	Garrett	40 acres	16 ha	2026	Savage River		Hiking, mountain biking, cross country skiing, snowshoeing and picnicking
Seneca Creek State Park	Montgomery	6,391 acres	2,586 ha	1958	Seneca Creek	Lake with fall foliage	Black Rock Mill, Seneca Schoolhouse; boating, fishing, picnicking, disc golf
Sideling Hill Creek State Park	Allegany	514 acres	208 ha	2022	Potomac River		Forest land, trails, rare species
Smallwood State Park	Charles	984 acres	398 ha	1958	Mattawoman Creek	Brick home	"Smallwood's Retreat" historic site; marina, picnicking, camping, nature trails
South Mountain State Park	Frederick, Washington	7,754 acres	3,138 ha			Green vista	Runs the length of South Mountain; Appalachian Trail; contiguous with other national, state and local parks
St. Clement's Island State Park	St. Mary's	62 acres	25 ha	1962	Potomac River	Lighthouse and large cross	Only accessible by boat; reconstructed lighthouse, memorial to first Marylanders landing March 25, 1634 (Maryland Day); hiking, picnicking, fishing
St. Mary's River State Park	St. Mary's	2,643 acres	1,070 ha	1968	St. Mary's Lake		Hiking, horseback and biking trails, picnicking, boat launch, canoeing, fishing, hunting
Susquehanna State Park	Cecil, Harford	2,753 acres	1,114 ha	1958	Susquehanna River, Upper Chesapeake Bay	Wide waterfall through trees	Rock Run Historical Area; fishing, camping, picnicking, boating, hiking trails
Swallow Falls State Park	Garrett	257 acres	104 ha	1930s	Youghiogheny River	Tumbling waters in winter	Camping, hiking, picnicking, nature programs
Tuckahoe State Park	Caroline, Queen Anne's	3,994 acres	1,616 ha	1963	Tuckahoe Creek	Paddlers	Hiking, biking and equestrian trails, canoeing, picnicking, camping, cabins, hunting, archery
Washington Monument State Park	Frederick, Washington	191 acres	77 ha	1934		Barrel-shaped stone monument	1827 stone monument to first President George Washington by citizens of nearby Boonsboro; picnicking, hiking on the Appalachian Trail
Wetipquin Creek State Park	Wicomico	445 acres	180 ha	2026			Under development.
Wills Mountain State Park	Allegany	470 acres	190 ha	1998		Valley vista	Undeveloped
Wolf Den Run State Park	Garrett	2,042 acres	826 ha	2018			Three parcels near Kitzmiller
Wye Oak State Park	Talbot	29 acres	12 ha	1939		Massive spreading oak tree	Site of celebrated oak tree lost in 2002; picnicking

== Maryland state battlefields ==
Name	County	Area		Estab- lished	Image	Remarks
Name	County	acres	ha	Estab- lished	Image	Remarks
North Point State Battlefield	Baltimore	9 acres	3.6 ha	2015		Preserves undeveloped land where War of 1812's Battle of North Point in the larger Battle of Baltimore on September 12, 1814 (Defenders Day) was fought with the invading British Army.
South Mountain State Battlefield	Frederick, Washington	2,543 acres	1,029 ha	1984		Civil War historic site of Battle of South Mountain in the Maryland Campaign, September 1862

== Maryland natural resources management areas ==
Name	County	Area		Estab- lished	River / lake / other	Image	Remarks
Name	County	acres	ha	Estab- lished	River / lake / other	Image	Remarks
Black Walnut Point Natural Resources Management Area	Talbot	58 acres	23.5 ha				Hiking, bird-watching
Deep Creek Lake Natural Resources Management Area	Garrett	3,900 acres	1578.3 ha		Deep Creek Lake		Boating
Fair Hill Natural Resources Management Area	Cecil	5,656 acres	2288.9 ha	1975			Horse riding, camping, hunting
Merkle Natural Resources Management Area and Visitor Center	Prince George's	1,670 acres	675.8 ha		Chesapeake Bay		
Monocacy River Natural Resources Area	Frederick	1,800 acres	728.4 ha	1975	Monocacy River		Hunting, fishing, hiking and horseback riding
Morgan Run Natural Environment Area	Carroll	2,000 acres	809.4 ha	1975			
Sassafras Natural Resources Management Area	Kent	1,200 acres	485.6		Sassafras River, Chesapeake Bay		Hiking, mountain biking, birding, horseback riding
Woodmont Natural Resources Management Area	Washington	3,425 acres	1,386 ha	1995	c/o Fort Frederick State Park		Formerly as Woodmont Rod & Gun Club property
Wye Island Natural Resources Management Area	Queen Anne's	2,450 acres	991.5 ha				
Youghiogheny Wild River Natural Environmental Area	Garrett						

== Other Maryland state areas ==
Name	County	Area		Estab- lished	Image	Remarks
Name	County	acres	ha	Estab- lished	Image	Remarks
Helen Avalynne Tawes Garden	Anne Arundel	5 acres	2 ha			
Jefferson Patterson Park & Museum	Calvert	560 acres	226.6 ha	1983		Hiking, exhibits, educational programs
Western Maryland Rail Trail	Allegany, Washington			1998		26-mile paved trail from Big Pool to Little Orleans

== Former Maryland state park ==
- The former Jonas Green State Park was transferred to Anne Arundel County and became Jonas and Anne Catharine Green Park.

== See also ==
- List of National Park System areas in Maryland
