= Savage River =

Savage River may refer to:

== Places ==
=== Australia ===
- Savage River (Tasmania), a tributary of the Pieman River
- Savage River, Tasmania, a town in northwestern Tasmania
- Savage River National Park, in Tasmania

=== United States ===
- Savage River (Maryland), a tributary of the Potomac River
  - Savage River Reservoir
- Savage River State Forest, in Maryland

== Other uses ==
- Savage River (TV series), a 2022 Australian television drama series
