= Susquehanna State Park (Maryland) =

State park in Maryland, United States

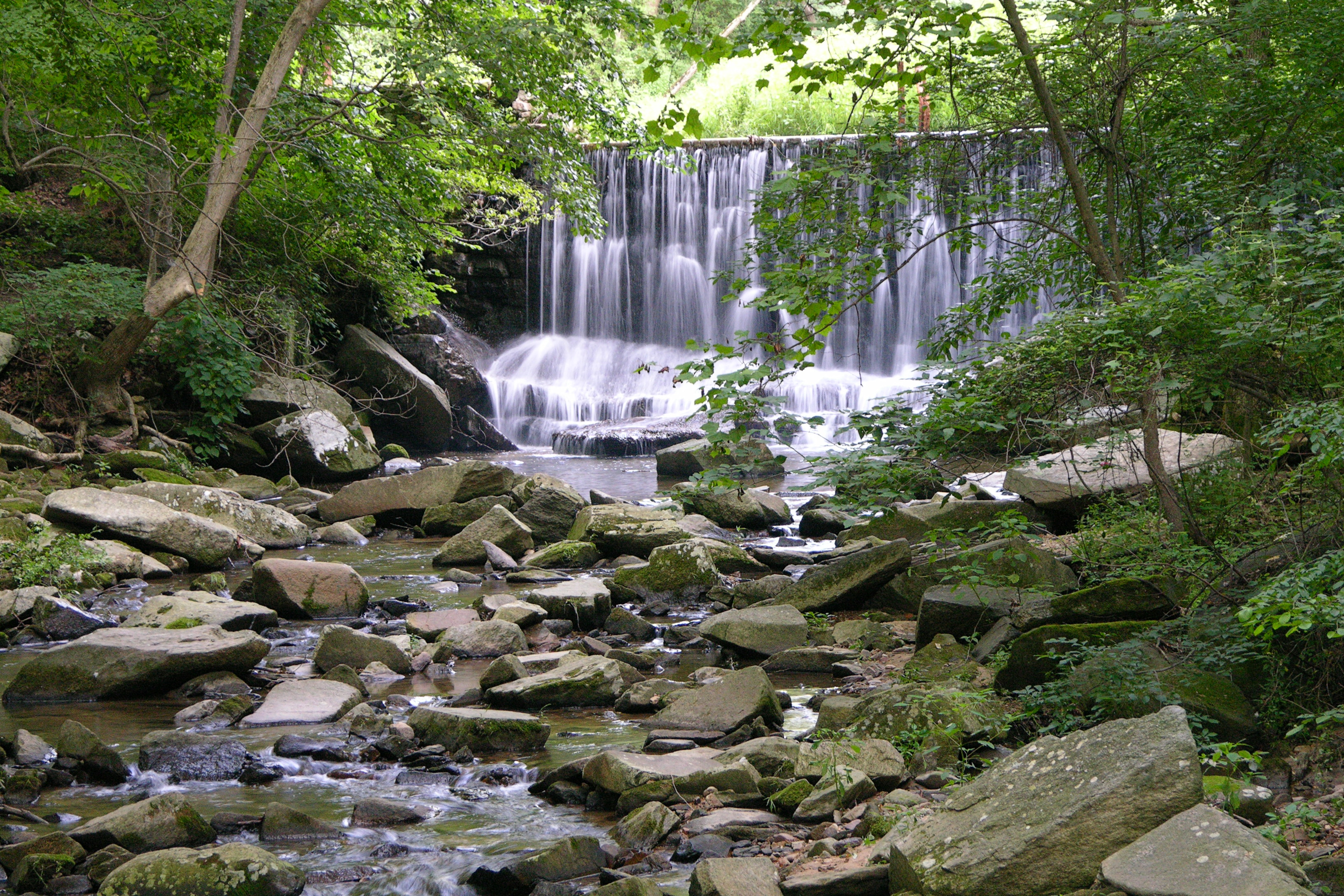

- Location within Maryland
- Location: Cecil and Harford counties, Maryland, United States
- Nearest city: Havre de Grace, Maryland
- Coordinates: 39°36′29″N 76°08′34″W
- Area: 2,753 acres (1,114 ha)
- Elevation: 26 ft (7.9 m)
- Established: 1960
- Administrator: Maryland Department of Natural Resources
- Designation: Maryland state park
- Website: Official website

Susquehanna State Park is a Maryland state park located on the banks of the lower Susquehanna River north of the city of Havre de Grace, Maryland. The main area is on the west bank of the river; the park also manages land on the river islands and east bank. The park offers fishing, boating, camping, and trails for hiking and equestrian use. It is managed as a complex with Rocks State Park and Palmer State Park by the Maryland Department of Natural Resources.

== History ==
The park saw its genesis in 1958 when the former president of the Baltimore Museum of Art, J. Gilman D’Arcy Paul, offered to donate 300 acres to the state. The state began its acquisition of land for the park in 1960.

== Features ==
The park's Rock Run Historical Area includes: the Rock Run Grist Mill; the 1804 Carter-Archer Mansion, which was once the home of mill owner John Archer; remnants of the Susquehanna and Tidewater Canal; and the restored Jersey Toll House, where fees were collected for the historic Port Deposit Bridge. The privately run Steppingstone Museum, which preserves and demonstrates Harford County's rural arts and crafts of the 1880-1920 period, is also located on the park grounds.

== Activities and amenities ==
The park's 15 miles (24 km) of trails include the Susquehanna Ridge Trail (three miles (4.8 km)), which offers views of the river valley, the Land of Promise (1.6 miles (2.6 km)), the Farm Road Trail (two miles (3.2 km)) and other named trails. The Lower Susquehanna Greenways Trail, which is co-located with the Mason-Dixon Trail, starts at the park and runs north along the river to the Conowingo Dam. The park also offers boating and fishing on the Susquehanna, campgrounds, and picnicking facilities.
