= North Point State Battlefield =

Historic preserve in Dundalk, Maryland, US

- Location within Maryland
- Location: Dundalk, Maryland, United States
- Coordinates: 39°16′44″N 76°29′15″W
- Area: 9 acres (3.6 ha)
- Designation: Maryland state battlefield
- Established: 2015; 11 years ago
- Administrator: Maryland Department of Natural Resources
- Website: North Point State Battlefield

North Point State Battlefield is a publicly owned historic preserve in Dundalk, Baltimore County, Maryland, that commemorates a portion of the site where the Battle of North Point was fought during the War of 1812. On September 12, 1814, Brigadier General John Stricker commanded forces of the Maryland Militia from within the park's borders. Stricker's men fought the invading British forces from behind a fenceline along the monument's eastern edge.

The 9-acre (3.6 ha) site opened to the public in 2015. Park features include wetlands, permeable parking and trail surfaces, boardwalks, and wildflower meadows. It is a satellite facility of North Point State Park, managed by the Maryland Department of Natural Resources.
