= Black walnut (disambiguation) =

Black walnut may refer to:

== Trees ==
Family Juglandaceae, genus Juglans sect. Rhysocaryon:

- Juglans nigra, the eastern black walnut, a species of flowering tree native to eastern North America.
- Juglans californica, California black walnut or Southern California black walnut.
- Juglans hindsii, the Northern California walnut or Hinds' black walnut.
- Juglans major, Arizona black walnut.
- Juglans microcarpa, Texas black walnut or little black walnut.
- Juglans venezuelensis, a species of black walnut endemic to Venezuela.

Other:

- Endiandra globosa, an unrelated species of Australian rainforest tree from the family Lauraceae.
- Endiandra palmerstonii, another species of Australian rainforest tree from the family Lauraceae.

== Places ==
- Black Walnut, Missouri, a community in the United States
- Black Walnut (Clover, Virginia), a historic house in Virginia
- Black Walnut Point Natural Resources Management Area, a state park in Maryland
