= St. Mary's River State Park =

State park in St. Mary's County, Maryland

- Location within Maryland Location within the United States
- Location: Saint Mary's County, Maryland, United States
- Nearest town: Lexington Park, Maryland
- Coordinates: 38°16′30″N 76°31′10″W
- Area: 2,643 acres (1,070 ha)
- Elevation: 98 ft (30 m)
- Established: 1968
- Administrator: Maryland Department of Natural Resources
- Designation: Maryland state park
- Website: Official website

St. Mary's River State Park is a Maryland state park located in St. Mary's County, Maryland. The park consists of two sites: one encompasses 250-acre (100 ha) St. Mary's Lake; the second covers 2,200 acres (890 ha) and is largely undeveloped. The park is managed by the Maryland Department of Natural Resources.

== History ==
The state acquired land for the park's first site between 1968 and 1974, with the lake being constructed in 1975. Acquisition of the park's second site began with the purchase of 450 acres in 1968; further acquisitions occurred until 1983.

== Activities and amenities ==
The park features fishing, non-motorized boating, canoeing, picnicking, and hunting. A 7.5-mile (12.1 km) trail around St. Mary's Lake is used for hiking, horseback riding, and mountain biking.
