= Martinak State Park =

State park in Caroline County, Maryland

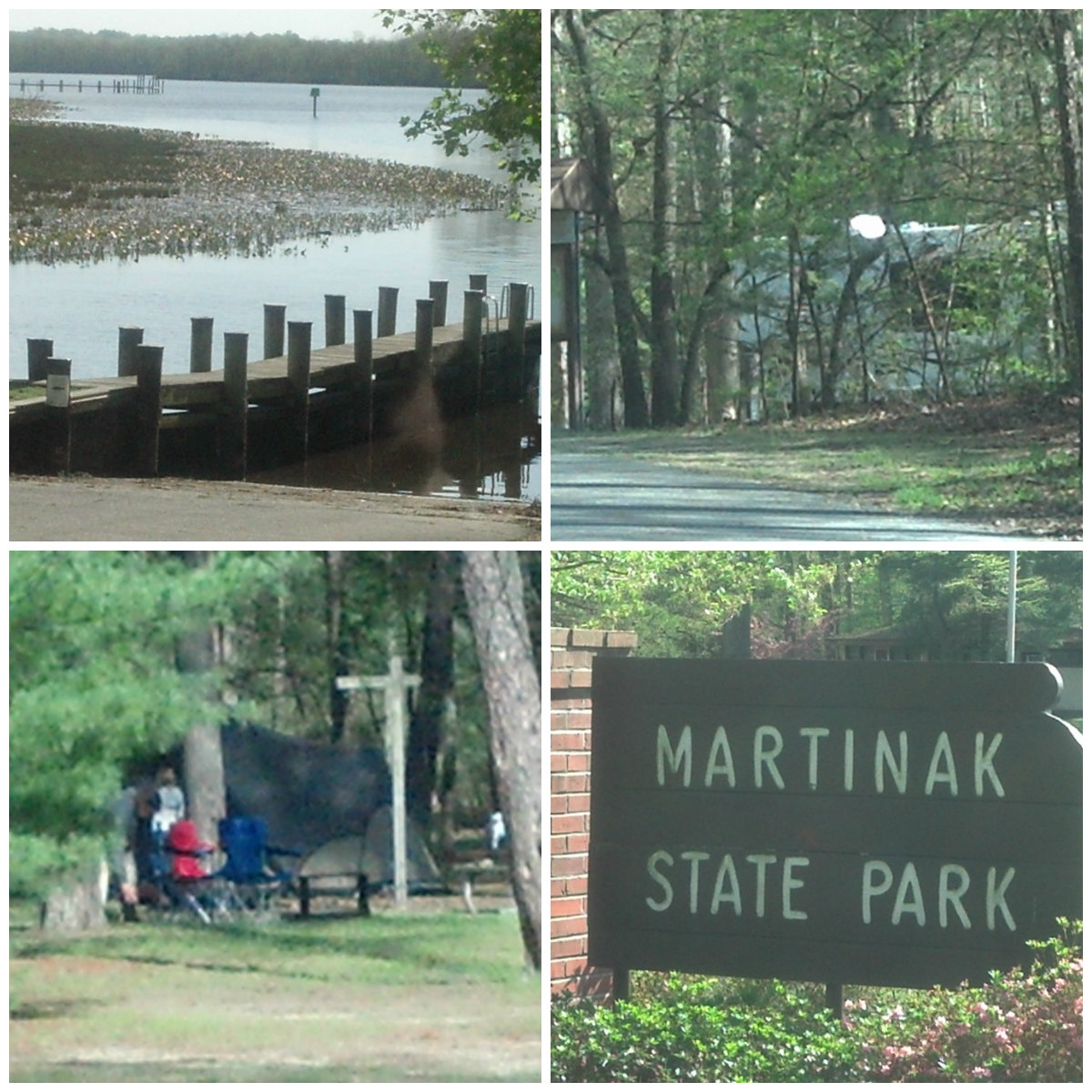

- Location within Maryland Location within the United States
- Location: Denton, Maryland, United States
- Coordinates: 38°51′45″N 75°50′23″W
- Area: 105 acres (42 ha)
- Elevation: 20 ft (6.1 m)
- Established: 1961
- Administrator: Maryland Department of Natural Resources
- Designation: Maryland state park
- Named for: Land donor George Martinak
- Website: Official website

Martinak State Park is a Maryland state park located on the Choptank River and Watts Creek, immediately south of Denton in Caroline County, Maryland. The park bears the name of George Martinak, who deeded his land to the state in 1961. The park opened in 1964. Site improvements including the addition of campsites, roads, and park office took place from 1964 to 1974. The park features boating access, fishing, campsites and cabins, hiking trails, a nature center, and painted rocks.
