= Fort Tonoloway State Park =

State park in Washington County, Maryland

- Location within Maryland
- Location: Washington County, Maryland, United States
- Nearest town: Hancock, Maryland
- Coordinates: 39°41′54″N 78°12′7″W
- Area: 26 acres (11 ha)
- Administrator: Maryland Department of Natural Resources
- Status: Undeveloped
- Designation: Maryland state park

Fort Tonoloway State Park is an undeveloped Maryland state park located near present-day Hancock. Fort Tonoloway was a frontier fort built in 1755 by Lt. Thomas Stoddert and men from the Maryland State Militia. The fort was also known as Stoddert's Fort. It was abandoned in 1756 when Fort Frederick was constructed.

The state park was at one time leased to the Boy Scouts. An archaeological investigation conducted by Rivanna Archaeological Services for Preservation Maryland was published in 2020.
