= Franklin Point State Park =

State park in Maryland, United States

- Location within Maryland
- Location: Anne Arundel County, Maryland, United States
- Nearest town: Shady Side, Maryland
- Coordinates: 38°48′49″N 76°30′44″W
- Area: 484 acres (196 ha)
- Established: 2015
- Administrator: Maryland Department of Natural Resources
- Designation: Maryland state park
- Website: Official website

Franklin Point State Park is a Maryland state park bordering Chesapeake Bay in Shady Side in Anne Arundel County. The park is a day-use area suitable for wildlife viewing, hiking, and paddling.

== History ==
Franklin Point opened after long-running efforts to prevent the area from being developed. The area was originally Deep Creek Airport which closed in the 1980s, and was then purchased by a real estate developer who planned on building 300 houses on the property. This effort was stopped by a local citizens group, who were later sued by the developer for defamation, but ended up winning the case. The property was then bought by Maryland Department of Natural Resources who turned it over the county, whose plan on developing the area included baseball diamonds and a parking lot. This plan was rejected by the Critical Area Commission owing to the sensitive shoreline. After this, the county lost interest in the project and the area stood unused for a decade. The park was later opened with the help of volunteers in 2015, who helped demolish abandoned structures and created trails as well as a boat launch.

== Ecology ==
The park's 484 acres (196 ha) feature a wide array of habitats including woodlands and tidal marshes. It is one of the last intact areas of undeveloped woodland on the west side of Chesapeake Bay. It also is host to a number of important species such as the rare and elusive Black rail, and the endangered beakrush. Common birds in the park include Yellow-throated warbler, Swamp sparrow, Bald eagle, Snowy egret, Saltmarsh sparrow, Pine warbler, Merlin, Barred owl, and Prairie warbler as well as many species of ducks, sandpipers, gulls, and plovers. It also has 4 recorded species of turtles (Diamondback terrapin, Common snapping turtle, Eastern mud turtle, and Common box turtle) and many different species of snakes and frogs. The interior woodlands host black oak, pin oak, American sweetgum and loblolly pine.
