= Greenwell State Park =

State park in St. Mary's County, Maryland

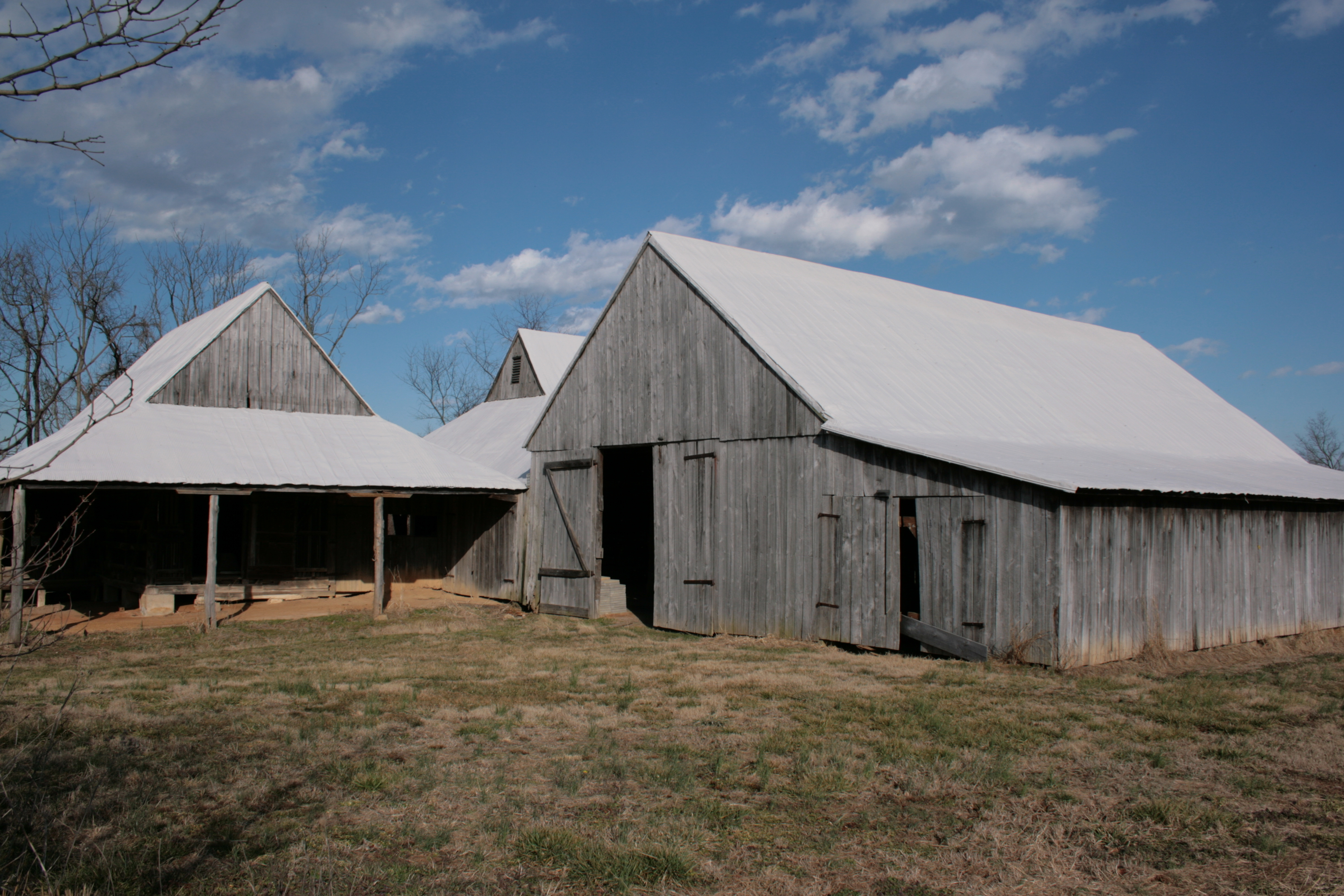
- Tobacco barn in the park

- Location within Maryland Location within the United States
- Location: St. Mary's County, Maryland, United States
- Nearest town: California, Maryland
- Coordinates: 38°22′08″N 76°31′45″W
- Area: 596 acres (241 ha)
- Elevation: 30 ft (9.1 m)
- Established: 1971
- Administrator: Maryland Department of Natural Resources
- Designation: Maryland state park
- Named for: John and Mary Greenwell
- Website: Official website

Greenwell State Park is a Maryland state park located on the Patuxent River in St. Mary's County, Maryland. The park features the historic Rosedale Manor House as well as the Bonds-Simms tobacco barns complex. Park activities include hiking, cycling, horseback riding, fishing, picnicking, hunting, swimming, and canoeing.

== History ==
The park originated in 1971, when John Phillip Greenwell, Jr. and his sister, Mary Wallace Greenwell, donated their 167-acre (68 ha) farm to the state for use as a public park. The state subsequently purchased the adjacent 430-acre (170 ha) Bond property and added it to the park.
