= Dans Mountain State Park =

State park in Allegany County, Maryland

- Location within Maryland
- Interactive map of Dans Mountain State Park
- Location: Allegany County, Maryland, United States
- Nearest city: Frostburg, Maryland
- Coordinates: 39°33′25″N 78°57′13″W
- Area: 482 acres (195 ha)
- Elevation: 2,208 ft (673 m)
- Established: 1952
- Administrator: Maryland Department of Natural Resources
- Designation: Maryland state park
- Website: Official website

Dans Mountain State Park is a Maryland state park located nine miles (14 km) south of Frostburg and to the east of the town of Lonaconing in Allegany County, Maryland. The park occupies 482 acres (195 ha) on 16-mile-long (26 km) Dans Mountain and is managed by the Maryland Department of Natural Resources.

== History ==
Dans Mountain was named after Daniel Cresap, the son of Thomas Cresap and an early settler of Allegany County who fell from a tree on the mountain while hunting bear cubs. According to the legendary tale, Cresap's hunting companion, the Delaware Indian Nemacolin, found his unconscious body and using a horse and litter dragged him home to safety.

The state park opened in 1952 and was developed in the 1970s. The General Assembly provided over $800,000 from 1973 to 1978 for the planning and construction of the park's swimming pool and other improvements.

== Activities and amenities ==
In addition to wildlife, mountain streams, and scenic overlooks, the park features an Olympic-sized swimming pool with bathhouse, concession stands during warm weather months, and a fishing pond that is stocked annually.

=== Dan's Rock ===
Dan's Rock, the highest point in Allegany County at 2,898 feet (883 m), sits about three miles (4.8 km) from the park at the northeast edge of Dan's Mountain Wildlife Management Area. It can be accessed from Old Dan's Rock Road in Midland. There is no direct access to Dan's Rock Overlook from Dan's Mountain State Park.
