= Cypress Branch State Park =

Public recreation area in Maryland, US

- Location within Maryland
- Interactive map of Cypress Branch State Park
- Location: Kent County, Maryland, United States
- Nearest town: Millington, Maryland
- Coordinates: 39°16′26″N 75°50′10″W
- Area: 314 acres (127 ha)
- Established: Purchased 2014; opened 2022
- Administrator: Maryland Department of Natural Resources
- Designation: Maryland state park
- Website: Cypress Branch State Park

Cypress Branch State Park is a 314-acre (127 ha) Maryland state park located two miles north of Millington in Kent County, Maryland, United States. The park's environmental mix includes agricultural fields and meadows, bottomland deciduous forests and wetlands. The park offers fishing ponds, picnicking, and a rudimentary trail system created from old farm lanes for hiking, biking and bird watching. The park is managed by the Maryland Department of Natural Resources.

== History ==
The park was created when the state combined the Big Mill Pond Fish Management Area with a 274-acre (111 ha) farm and plant nursery the state purchased in 2014. Cypress Branch State Park opened in 2022.
