= Sang Run State Park =

State park in Garrett County, Maryland

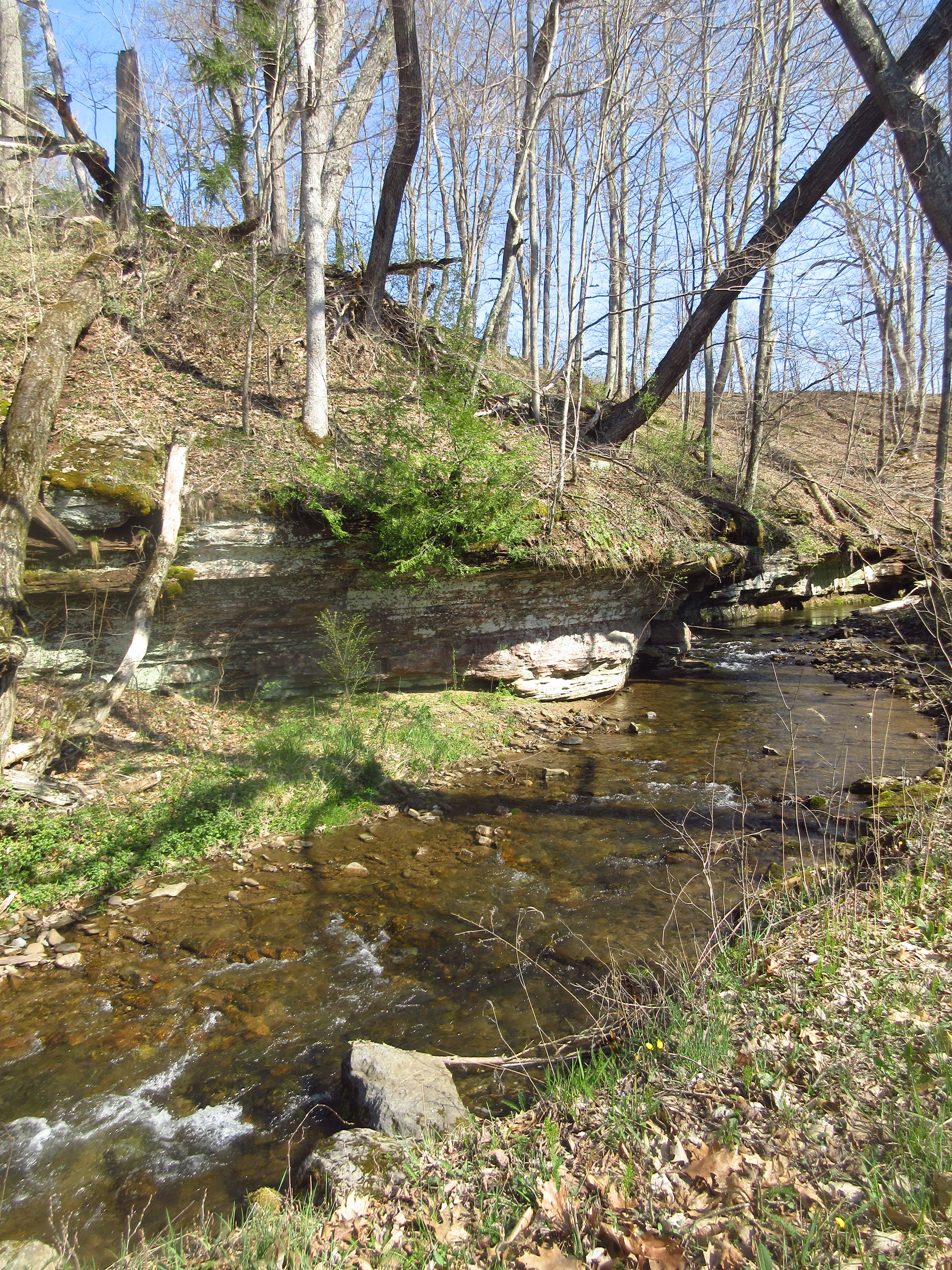
- View along Ginseng Run in the park

- Location within Maryland
- Location: Sang Run, Maryland, United States
- Nearest city: Frostburg, Maryland
- Coordinates: 39°34′05″N 79°25′21″W
- Area: 264 acres (107 ha)
- Elevation: 2,008 ft (612 m)
- Established: 2017
- Administrator: Maryland Department of Natural Resources
- Designation: Maryland state park
- Website: Official website

Sang Run State Park is a Maryland state park covering 264 acres (107 ha) in Garrett County, Maryland. Focal points of the state park are a homestead, Friends Delight, that dates from the early 1800s and the historic Friends Store, which as a center of Sang Run's community life sold various staples and served as post office until the 1970s. The park offers picnicking, hiking trail, and a put-in for Class V whitewater rafting on the Youghiogheny River.
