= Wills Mountain State Park =

State park in Maryland, USA

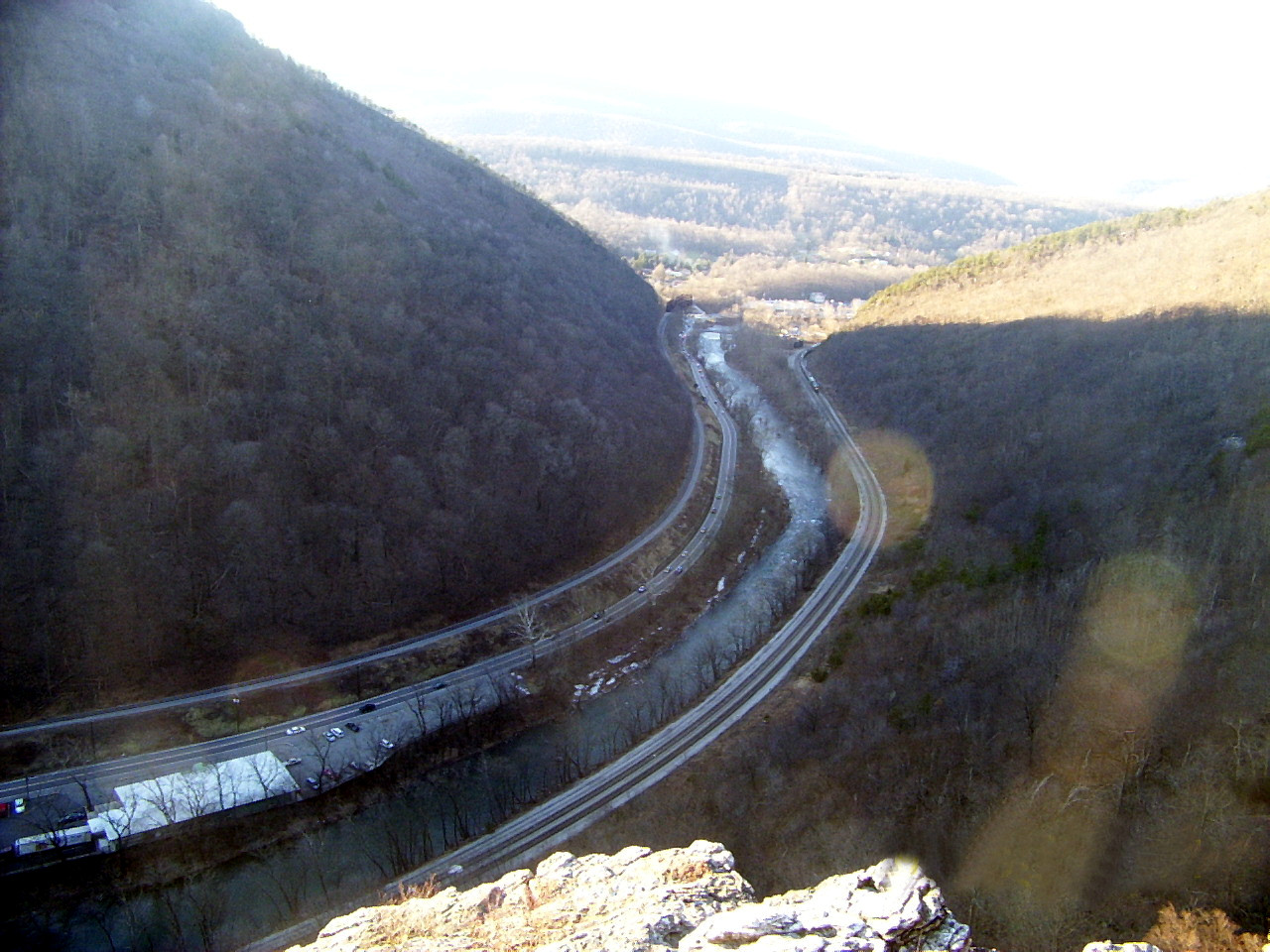
- Cumberland Narrows seen from the Wills Mountain side of the gap

- Location within Maryland
- Location: Allegany County, Maryland, United States
- Nearest town: Cumberland, Maryland
- Coordinates: 39°40′07″N 78°46′54″W
- Area: 470 acres (190 ha)
- Elevation: 804 ft (245 m)
- Established: 1998
- Administrator: Maryland Department of Natural Resources
- Designation: Maryland state park

Wills Mountain State Park is a Maryland state park on Wills Mountain overlooking the Cumberland Narrows in Allegany County, Maryland. The park occupies 470 acres (190 ha) on the northwest edge of the City of Cumberland. It is under the control of the Maryland Department of Natural Resources.

== History ==
From 1899 until 1930, Wills Mountain was the site of the Wills Mountain Inn, a mansion featuring 46 bedrooms with private baths and a grand ballroom that was initially used as a fraternal clubhouse and informal country club. In 1902, the property was sold to Dr. Henry Fry for conversion to a sanatorium. The property burned down in 1930.

In 1952, the Maryland State Planning Commission encouraged the state to create an historic preserve on Wills Mountain through the purchase of 400 acres, the improvement of a private road that ascended to the summit, and development of picnicking and sightseeing facilities to take advantage of the natural beauty of the overlook. The park was created in 1998 when the state purchased 350 acres from Carl G. Valentine for $160,000, and George and Joan Henderson donated another 51 acres. The 2009 Maryland Land Preservation, Parks and Recreation Plan described the parcel as "virtually inaccessible" and "sensitive" with "no uses ... official or informal." The state began purchasing adjoining parcels in 2017 with the intention of creating public access to the site. An additional purchase of 48 acres was made in 2024.
