= Newtowne Neck State Park =

State park in St. Mary's County, Maryland

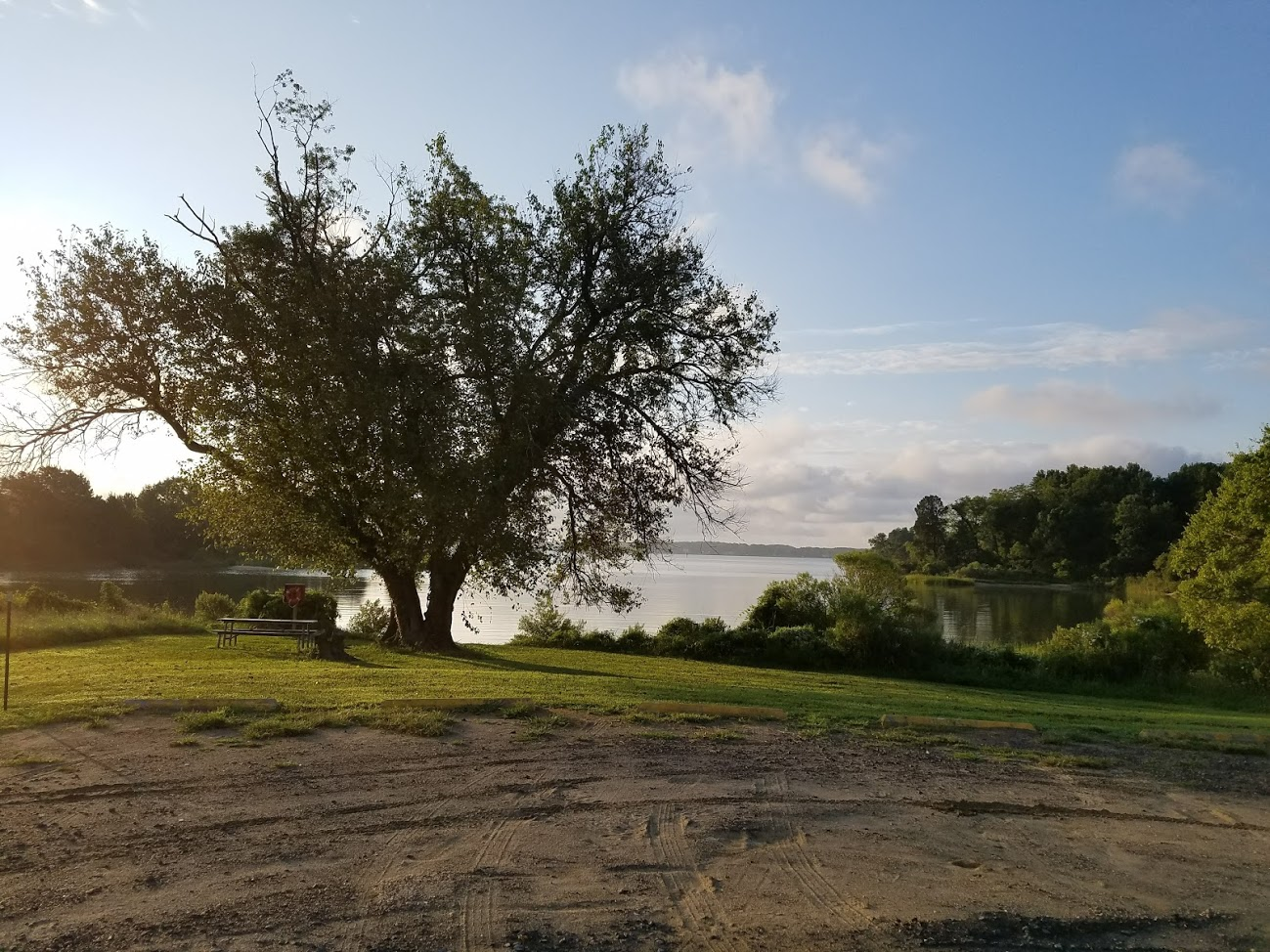

- Location within Maryland
- Location: St. Mary's County, Maryland, United States
- Nearest city: Leonardtown, Maryland
- Coordinates: 38°14′43″N 76°42′29″W
- Area: 794 acres (321 ha)
- Elevation: 13 ft (4.0 m)
- Established: 2009
- Administrator: Maryland Department of Natural Resources
- Designation: Maryland state park
- Website: Official website

Newtowne Neck State Park is a Maryland state park located four miles (6.4 km) southwest of Leonardtown in St. Mary's County, Maryland. The park sits on a peninsula that is surrounded by Breton Bay, St. Clements Bay, and the Potomac River. It is managed by the Maryland Department of Natural Resources.

== History ==
The park was part of the state's purchase of former Jesuit holdings in Southern Maryland in 2009. The discovery of military ordnance on the site forced the park to close in 2012. It reopened to the public in 2014.

== Activities and amenities ==
The state park offers seven miles (11 km) of undeveloped shoreline, fishing, hunting, unimproved hiking and biking trails, and kayaking.
