= Bohemia River State Park =

State park in Maryland, US

- Location within Maryland
- Location: Cecil County, Maryland, United States
- Nearest town: Chesapeake City, Maryland
- Coordinates: 39°28′41″N 75°51′13″W
- Area: 466 acres (189 ha)
- Established: 2017; opened 2022
- Administrator: Maryland Department of Natural Resources
- Designation: Maryland state park
- Website: Bohemia River State Park

Bohemia River State Park is a Maryland state park situated along the north bank of Great Bohemia Creek, a tributary of the Bohemia River, in Cecil County, Maryland, United States. The park's environmental mix includes agricultural fields, hardwood forests, marshes, beaches, tidal inlets, and open water. The park has five miles (8.0 km) of natural-surface, multi-use trails and is used for low-impact recreational activities including hiking, biking, wildlife viewing, fishing and hunting.

== History ==
Bohemia River State Park opened on Earth Day in 2022. The state of Maryland purchased the site in 2017 and began making improvements in 2021. Further improvements including the establishment of five more miles of trails and access to a boat launch area are planned for 2025.
