= Patuxent River State Park =

State park in Maryland, United States

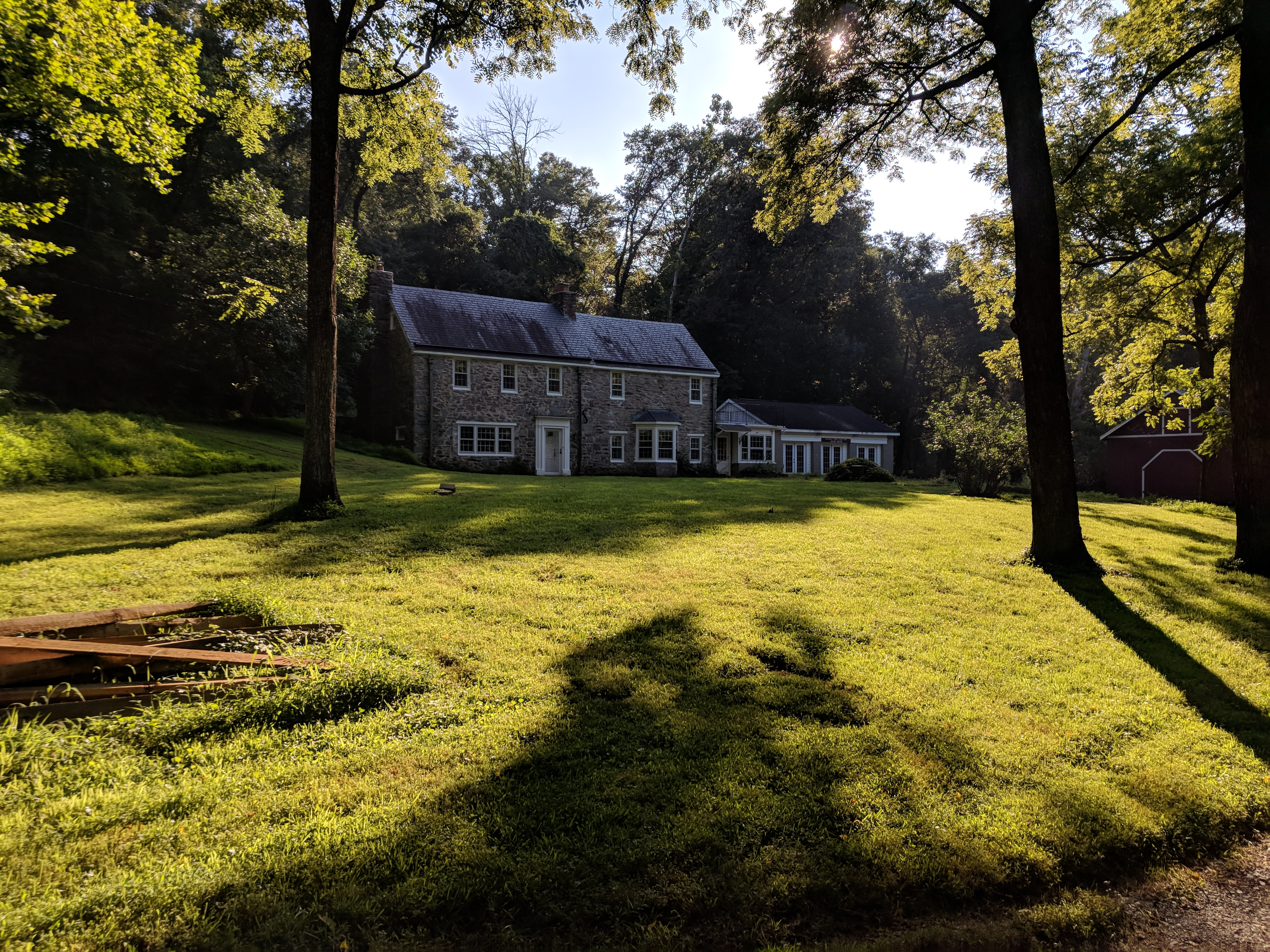
- Park Headquarters, Visitor Center and Nature Center

- Location within Maryland
- Location: Howard and Montgomery counties, Maryland, United States
- Nearest town: Olney, Maryland
- Coordinates: 39°15′34″N 77°04′53″W
- Area: 6,703 acres (2,713 ha)
- Elevation: 407 ft (124 m)
- Established: 1963
- Administrator: Maryland Department of Natural Resources
- Designation: Maryland state park
- Website: Official website

Patuxent River State Park is a Maryland state park located along the upper reaches of the Patuxent River in Howard and Montgomery counties in Maryland. The park features hunting, fishing, mountain biking, horseback riding, and hiking on unsigned and untended trails. Planning for the park began in 1963, with the Maryland General Assembly funding land purchases in each year from 1964 to 1968. It is part of the Northeastern coastal forests ecoregion.

== See also ==
- Parks in the Baltimore–Washington Metropolitan Area
