= Chapel Point State Park =

State park in Charles County, Maryland

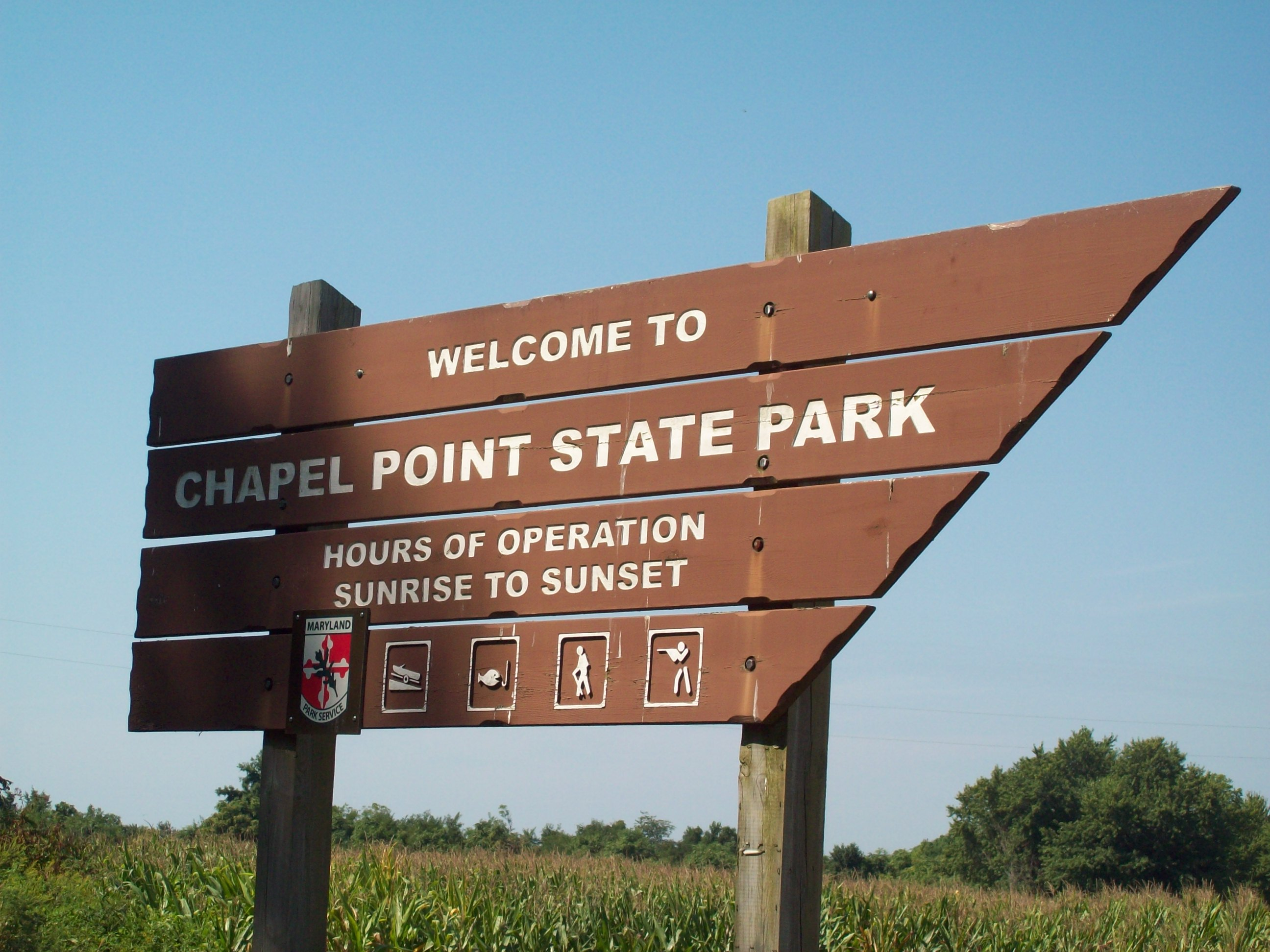

- Location within Maryland
- Interactive map of Chapel Point State Park
- Location: Charles County, Maryland, United States
- Nearest town: La Plata, Maryland
- Coordinates: 38°27′50″N 77°01′44″W
- Area: 821 acres (332 ha)
- Elevation: 20 ft (6.1 m)
- Established: 1972
- Administrator: Charles County
- Designation: Maryland state park
- Website: Official website

Chapel Point State Park is a Maryland state park located on the Port Tobacco River, a tributary of the Potomac, in Charles County, Maryland. The park offers fishing and hunting and is under the management of Charles County.

== History ==
Chapel Point was once part of the 4,000-acre (1,600 ha) St. Thomas Manor patented by the Roman Catholic Church in 1638. In the 1880s, the Jesuits, in partnership with J. C. and W. M. Howard, built a resort known as Hotel Belleview on Chapel Point, with guests brought in by steamboat from Washington, D.C. In 1924, the site hosted the first Charles County Fair. From about 1926 to 1948, Chapel Point was the site of an amusement park that offered picnicking, rollerskating, a restaurant, beach with bath houses, and hotel. The site was acquired from the Corporation of Roman Catholic Clergymen by the Maryland Department of Natural Resources in 1972 to protect its scenic value and the open space associated with the state's early development.

== Features ==
Adjacent to the park, St. Ignatius Church and cemetery, the oldest continuous Roman Catholic parish in the United States, offers a scenic river view.
