= Dans Mountain =

Mountain in Maryland, United States

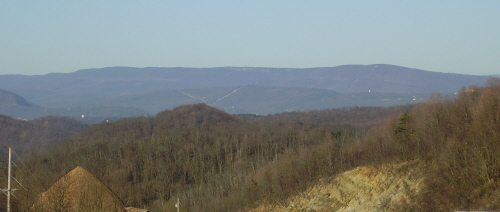
- Dans Mountain

Highest point
- Elevation: 2,895 ft (882 m) NGVD 29
- Coordinates: 39°34′54″N 78°53′50″W

Geography
- Location: Allegany County, Maryland
- Parent range: Allegheny Mountains
- Topo map: USGS Lonaconing

Climbing
- Easiest route: Drive up

Dans Mountain is located in Allegany County, Maryland, USA between Georges Creek and the North Branch Potomac River. The highest point on Dans Mountain is called Dan's Rock which has an elevation of 2,895 feet (882 m). The mountain rises 2,200 feet (670 m) above the town of LaVale and the summit is the highest point in Allegany County. Although there are higher points in Maryland, Dans Mountain has the most impressive escarpment of Maryland's mountains. It is essentially continuous with the longer escarpment that continues both north (into Pennsylvania) and south (into West Virginia) known as the Allegheny Front.

Dans Mountain State Park is located along a 16-mile (26 km) stretch of the mountain, 9 miles (14 km) south of Frostburg, Maryland. Dan's Rock Overlook is the highest scenic overlook in the park. The park also features a pond that is stocked annually, an Olympic-sized pool with a modern bathhouse, and concession stands.

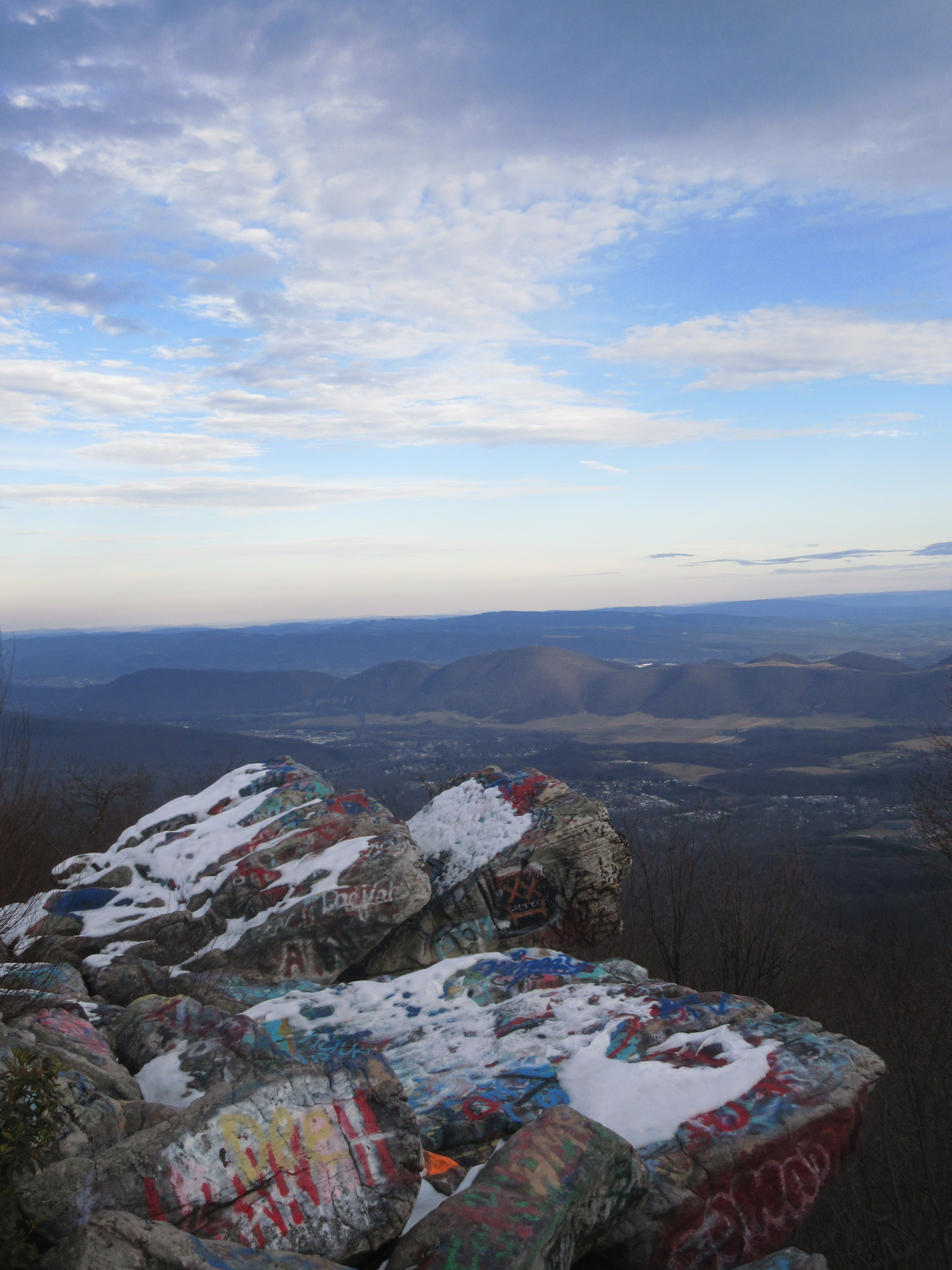
View toward the village of Bel Air from the Dan's Rock Overlook.

Dans Mountain is named for Daniel Cresap, the son of Thomas Cresap and one of the first settlers in Allegany County. Cresap was known for being adventurous, often hunting with a Delaware Indian named Nemacolin. While pursuing a bear in a tree, Daniel fell and lay unconscious until Nemacolin found him, and dragged Daniel home to safety. Since that event, the mountain has been known as Dans Mountain.

Dan's Mountain Wildlife Management Area protects the mountain in an area covering 9,504 acres.
