= North Point State Park =

State park in Maryland, United States

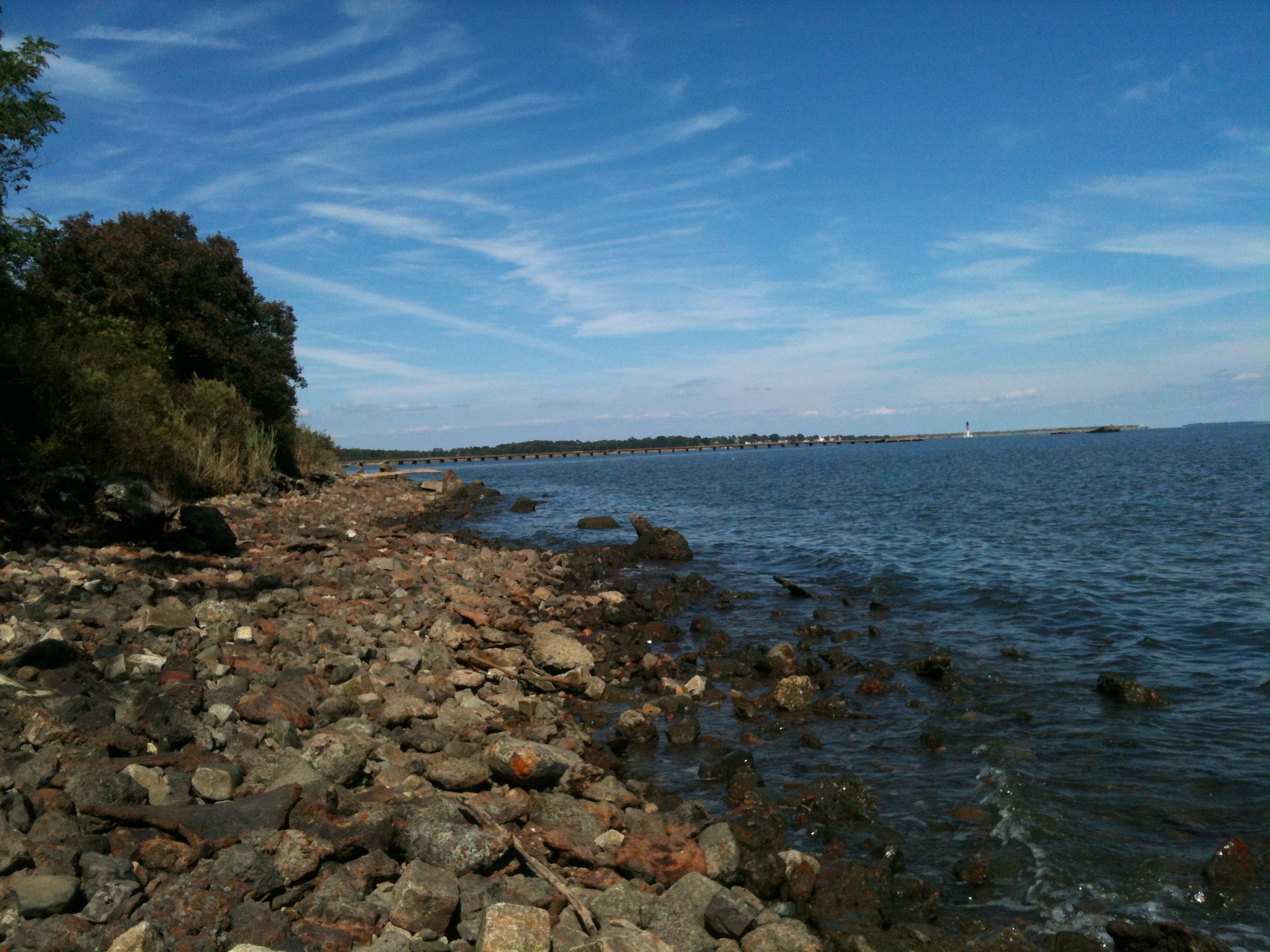

- Location within Maryland
- Location: Baltimore County, Maryland, United States
- Nearest town: Edgemere, Maryland
- Coordinates: 39°12′27″N 76°25′38″W
- Area: 1,328 acres (537 ha)
- Elevation: 10 ft (3.0 m)
- Established: 1987
- Administrator: Maryland Department of Natural Resources
- Designation: Maryland state park
- Website: Official website

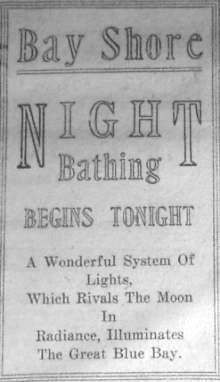
1921 newspaper ad for Bay Shore Park

North Point State Park is a Maryland state park located on the Chesapeake Bay in Edgemere, Baltimore County, Maryland. The park includes the site of the former Bay Shore Park, which was one of the state's premiere amusement parks during the first half of the 20th century. The park features restored remnants of the old amusement park as well as facilities for swimming, picnicking, bicycling, and hiking. Black Marsh, a 667-acre (270 ha) state wildlands area, makes up half the park's area. The park is administered by the Maryland Department of Natural Resources.

== History ==
The park occupies the southeastern portion of Patapsco River Neck, a peninsula of historically agricultural use. Evidence suggests that the area was first occupied by humans 9000 years ago. Members of the Susquehannock, a tribe of the Iroquois nation, inhabited the area. During the War of 1812, it was on the route traveled by British troops intent on invading Baltimore from the southeast and several skirmishes were fought there.

The first deed ever recorded in Baltimore County was to Thomas Todd in 1664 (Todd’s Inheritance). Portions of Todd’s original holdings continue to be farmed today.

The Todd homestead lies adjacent to the park.

Part of Todd’s land holdings became the site of Bay Shore Amusement Park, a popular destination for summer visitors from 1906 through 1947.

=== Bay Shore Park ===
Bay Shore Amusement Park (or Bay Shore Park) was built on 30 acres in 1906 by the United Railways and Electric Company of Baltimore using plans drawn up by architects Otto Simonson and Theodore Wells Pietsch. During its time, the park was a lively and attractive place offering a variety of recreations and relaxation along the Chesapeake Bay. Activities included a dance hall, bowling alley, restaurant, and pier. In addition to the trolley/streetcar from Baltimore, visitors could reach the park by steamboat from Baltimore to the park pier. Jimmy Doolittle won the Schneider Trophy seaplane race held at the park in 1925, an event attended by aviation pioneers Orville Wright and Glenn L. Martin.

In 1947, Bethlehem Steel bought and tore down the amusement park. The attractions were moved to a new park, Bay Island Beach, in the 1950s, which was then torn down by Bethlehem Steel in the 1960s. In 1987, the Maryland Department of Natural Resources purchased the land from Bethlehem Steel for five million dollars to create what was then known as Black Marsh State Park. (Note: According to Jacques Kelly, who went looking for the park after it was torn down, the area is still as beautiful as before, a “delightful summertime oasis.” Much of the old facilities, according to Kelly, has survived and/or has been renovated and still is visited with people daily. The landmarks that survived have given tourists and historians information on what the park was originally used for.)

Because the amusement park was a big proponent of the use of streetcars and used them for recreation, in 1992, Bay Shore Amusement Park and its trolley station were evaluated by the Maryland Historical Trust for the National Register of Historic Places. They were found to eligible because of their association with streetcar-related recreation.

== Activities and amenities ==
The park has several piers and provides beach access to visitors for wading and swimming. There are picnic tables and grills on site. The historical fountain has been restored, as well as the old trolley station, which is used by permit for large gatherings.

The Takos Visitor Center, which opened in 2002, was named in honor of Volunteer Ranger Steve Takos who spearheaded the renovation efforts at the park. It was designed to resemble the amusement's park former hotel and restaurant, and boasts an educational science room, multiple history and nature-oriented exhibits, including a large saltwater fish tank, and a conference room.
