= Steppingstone Museum =

American non-profit institution

Coordinates: 39°36′07″N 76°08′18″W

The Steppingstone Museum is a non-profit educational and cultural institution on the Susquehanna River, northwest of Havre de Grace, Maryland, whose mission is to preserve and interpret the rural heritage of Harford County, Maryland.

The museum displays and preserves the private collection of 7,000 tools and artifacts amassed by J. Edmund Bull along with later accessions. The Bull collection was first displayed at his home, which he called Steppingstone. In 1979, the museum relocated to the former Gilman Paul property, an 18th-century farm now in Susquehanna State Park, and the museum was expanded to include demonstrations of various trades commonplace in rural America of the 19th century. Barns and farm buildings exhibit the work of broom makers, blacksmiths, stone cutters, masons, and other tradesmen.

The museum programs special events relating to 19th- and early 20th-century history.

== June 2, 2024 Fire ==
The display barn at the Steppingstone Farm Museum in Harford County burned to the ground on the afternoon of June 2, 2024. This barn was not open to visitors at the time of the fire.

No lives were lost. The barn was valued at roughly $200,000 and the Fire Marshal reported that the value of the historic artifacts stored in the structure could not be assessed at this time.

The cause of the blaze is under investigation.
