= Black Walnut Point Natural Resources Management Area =

State park in Maryland, United States

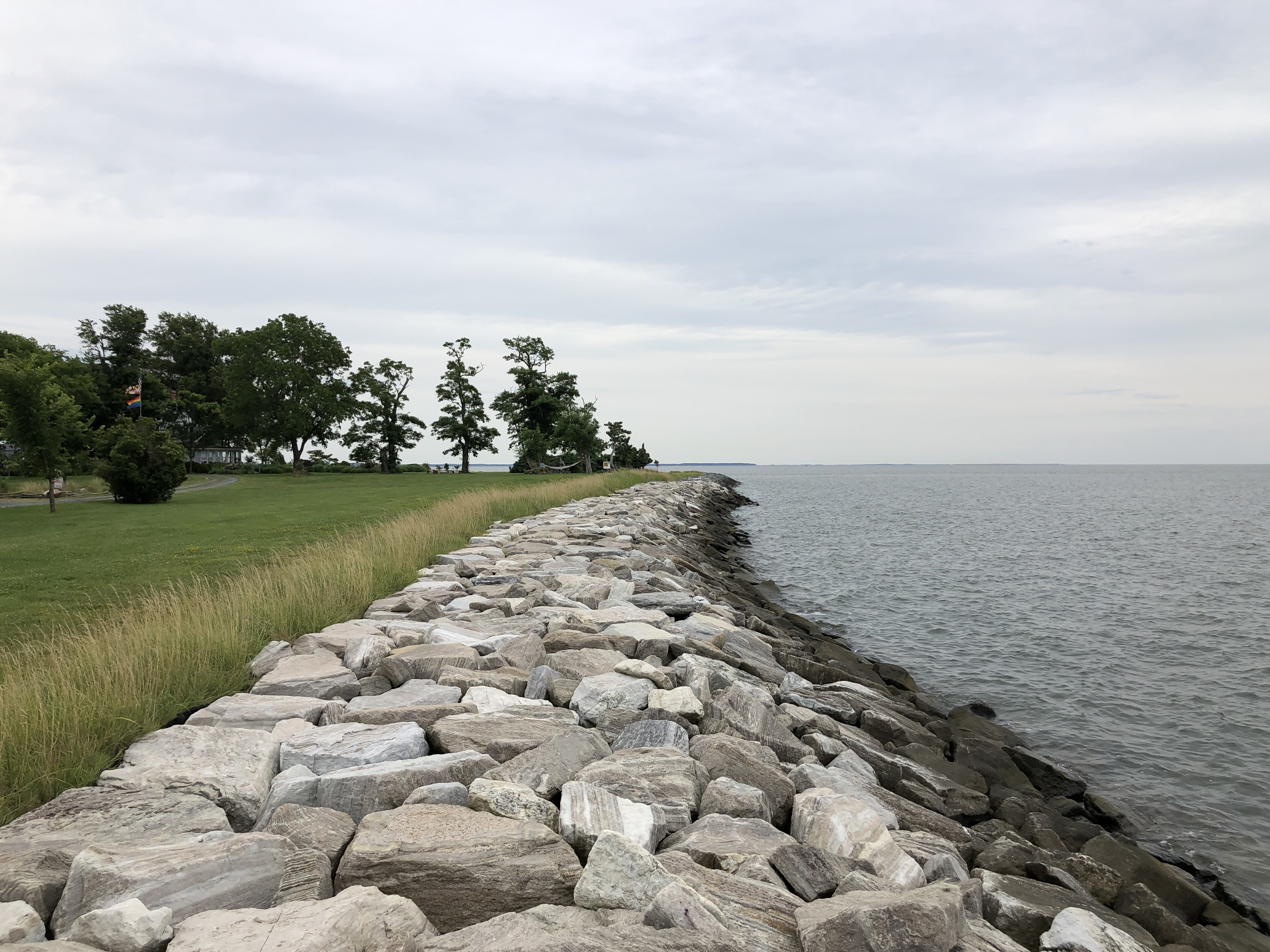
- The shoreline of the Chesapeake Bay at Black Walnut Point NRMA
- Interactive map of Black Walnut Point Natural Resources Management Area
- Location: Tilghman Island,Talbot County, Maryland, United States
- Coordinates: 38°40′34″N 76°20′29″W
- Area: 58 acres (23 ha)
- Administrator: Maryland Park Service
- Designation: Maryland state park
- Website: Official website

Black Walnut Point Natural Resources Management Area (NRMA) is a 58-acre Maryland state park located on the southern tip of Tilghman Island in Talbot County, Maryland. The park sits at the confluence of the Chesapeake Bay and the Choptank River. It is operated by the Maryland Park Service.

The 6 acres at the tip of the park are leased to the Black Walnut Point Inn, a private bed-and-breakfast.

== History ==
In the 1960s, the inn at Black Walnut Point was rented by the Soviet Embassy in Washington, DC for use by Embassy personnel and their families.

=== Purchase ===
The Maryland Department of Natural Resources purchased the land in 1986, the transaction receiving approval from the Board of Public Works on November 19. The purchase drew criticism, however, as Peter F. O'Malley, the former Prince George's County Democratic leader, was the seller. Delegate Richard F. Colburn objected to the transaction. Additionally, the state later leased the site's Inn to Brenda C. Ward, the deputy clerk of the Maryland House of Delegates, at a "below-market rate." Department of Natural Resources officials insisted that no special treatment was given.

== Recreation ==
The park features hiking trails, water access, and views of the Chesapeake Bay. The site is a prominent birdwatching area as well, with more than 230 species reportedly spotted in the park, including osprey, waterfowl, and bald eagles. The Talbot Bird Club, a chapter of the Maryland Ornithological Society, hosts birdwatching events in the park.

== Erosion ==
The park shoreline has been subject to erosion. A 1915 report from the U.S. Geological Survey found that Black Walnut Point had experienced the "maximum encroachment of the sea" on Tilghman Island between 1847 and 1910, losing a quarter-mile of land in that time. A 2014 Maryland Department of Natural Resources proposal claimed that erosion was threatening the road in the park and proposed stone revetment to slow erosion. In 2021, the Talbot County Department of Planning and Zoning identified the park as a candidate for land restoration.

In 2025, the Maryland Department of General Services invited bids on a project for the "installation of erosion control measures" within the park.

== See also ==
- List of Maryland state parks
