= Rocks State Park =

State park in Harford County, Maryland, United States

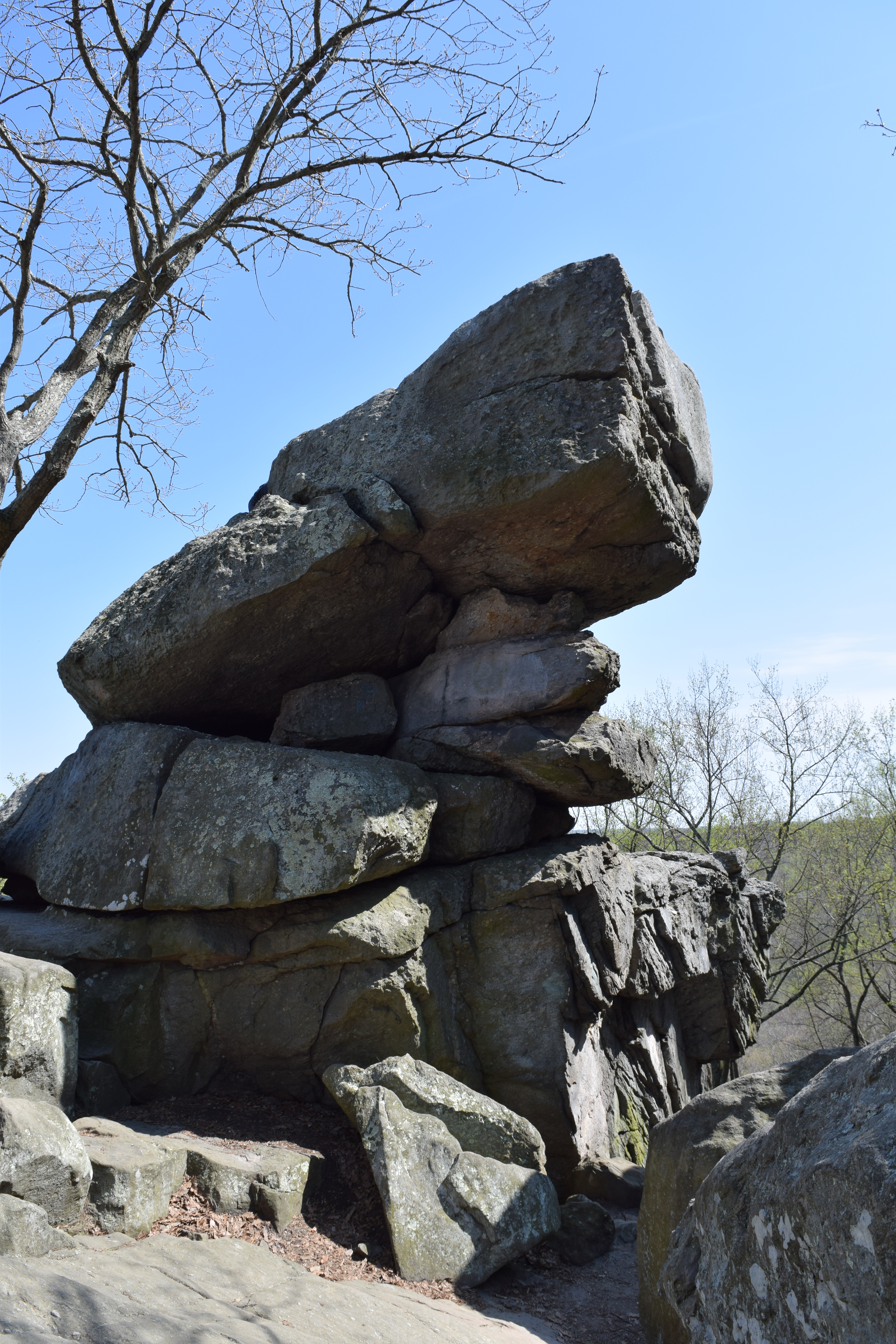

- Location within Maryland Location within the United States
- Location: Harford County, Maryland, United States
- Nearest town: Pylesville, Maryland
- Coordinates: 39°38′16″N 76°24′39″W
- Area: 1,060 acres (430 ha)
- Elevation: 308 ft (94 m)
- Established: 1949
- Administrator: Maryland Department of Natural Resources
- Designation: Maryland state park
- Website: Official website

View from the King and Queen's Seat

Rocks State Park is a Maryland state park located in and around Deer Creek Valley near Pylesville, Harford County, Maryland. The park's 1,060 acres (430 ha) preserve the geologic formation known as the King and Queen's Seat and other features in three non-contiguous areas near the junction of Maryland Route 24 and Maryland Route 165. It is managed by the Maryland Department of Natural Resources.

== History ==
The belief that the King and Queen's Seat rock formation was used by Native Americans for ceremonial purposes stems from a book published in 1880 by Thomas Wysong entitled The Rocks of Deer Creek: Their Legends and History. Wysong's account was written for "the young people especially,... mingling fact and fancy." An archaeological investigation by the Maryland State Highway Administration begun in 2005 failed to find evidence that the site had significance to modern Indians as a “traditional cultural property.” The “Rocks of Deer Creek” were already a tourist attraction in the 19th century, served by the Maryland and Pennsylvania Railroad at milepost 35.3 until 1958. The state purchased 82 acres at the site in 1949, opening it under the name Deer Creek State Park in 1953.

== Park areas ==
Main
The park has three noncontiguous sections in Deer Creek Valley. The largest section, home to park headquarters, is located along Rocks Ridge and is home to the King and Queen's Seat rock formation, a 190-foot (58 m) rock outcropping that towers above the banks of Deer Creek.
Falling Branch
The Falling Branch area is a 67-acre (27 ha) tract of land located 5 miles (8.0 km) north of the Rock Ridge section, along the Falling Branch tributary of Deer Creek. It is home to Kilgore Falls, the second highest waterfall in Maryland.
Hidden Valley
The Hidden Valley section, located 5 miles (8.0 km) to the west of the Falling Branch area, is an undeveloped area along the banks of Deer Creek primarily used for fishing.

== Activities and amenities ==
The park offers scenic views on 3.5 miles (5.6 km) of hiking trails as well as tubing on Deer Creek and picnicking facilities with pavilions. Hunting and fishing are also available.

== In popular culture ==
Kilgore Falls and the King and Queen's Seat rock formation were featured in the movie Tuck Everlasting.
