= Deer Creek (Maryland) =

River in Maryland and Pennsylvania, USA

Coordinates: 39°37′34.98″N 76°18′38″W

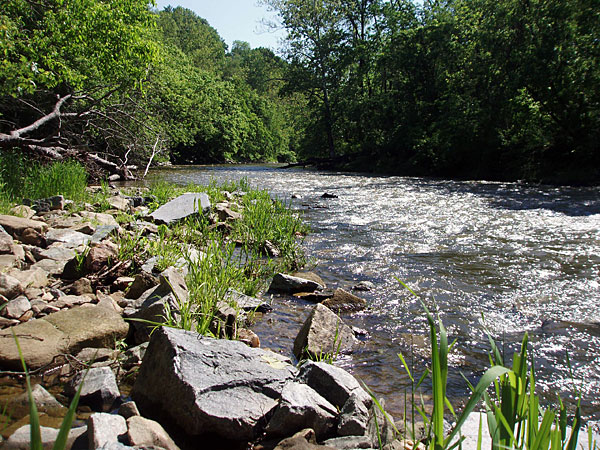
Fishing in Deer Creek

Deer Creek is a 52.9-mile-long (85.1 km) river in Maryland and Pennsylvania that flows through the scenic areas of Harford County and empties into the Susquehanna River, roughly halfway between the Interstate 95 bridge and Conowingo Dam. Its watershed area is 171 square miles (440 km^{2}). Its watershed area in MD (excluding water) is 145 square miles (380 km^{2}), with 3% impervious surface in 1994. It serves as a divider between the agricultural and urban/suburban areas of Harford County.

== Geography ==
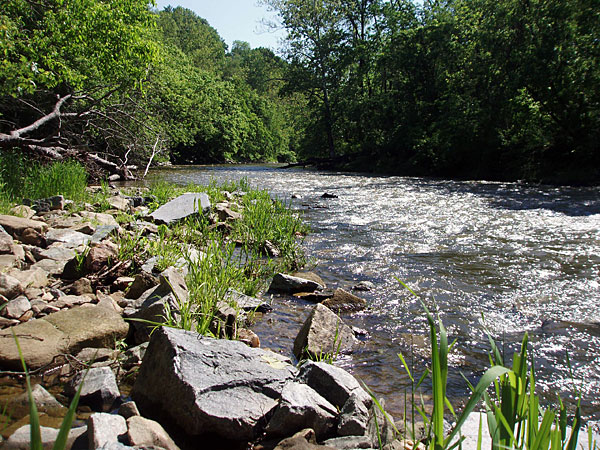
Deer Creek in 2005

Deer Creek rises in Shrewsbury in York County, Pennsylvania, and flows southeast, soon entering Maryland. It cuts across the northeastern corner of Baltimore County and into Harford County, where it runs through Rocks State Park, Palmer State Park, and Susquehanna State Park, passing north of the Bel Air area.

The only dam on Deer Creek, the Wilson Mill Dam, is located along Glenville Road in Harford County. A Denil (baffle) fish ladder was built beside the dam in 2000, re-opening approximately twenty-five miles of spawning habitat to several anadromous fish species.

Deer Creek supported the last known population of the Maryland darter (Etheostoma sellare), the only endemic vertebrate in Maryland . The creek is commonly used for recreation in the summer months.

The Deer Creek Bridge, Stewartstown Railroad carries the Stewartstown Railroad over Deer Creek in Hopewell Township and Shrewsbury Township, Pennsylvania.
