= Palmer State Park =

State park in Harford County, Maryland

- Location within Maryland
- Location: Harford County, Maryland, United States
- Nearest town: Dublin, Maryland
- Coordinates: 39°36′59″N 76°16′38″W
- Area: 590 acres (240 ha)
- Elevation: 312 ft (95 m)
- Established: 1965
- Administrator: Maryland Department of Natural Resources
- Designation: Maryland state park
- Website: Official website

Palmer State Park is a Maryland state park located along Deer Creek two miles southwest of Dublin in Harford County, Maryland. The state park saw its genesis in 1965, when Gerald and Ruth Palmer donated 463 acres for use as a public park. The park's historic industrial sites include remnants of the Husband Flint Mill and Deer Creek Iron Works. The heavily forested area is open to canoeing, fishing, and hiking.
