= Maryland power plant research program =

The Maryland Power Plant Research Program (PPRP) is a government program within the Maryland Department of Natural Resources and is charged with addressing power plant licensing issues. PPRP was established under the Power Plant Siting and Research Act of 1971. This legislation provided a model for addressing power plant licensing issues which several other states have adopted. PPRP is housed within DNR’s headquarters in Annapolis, Maryland.

== Mission and functions ==
PPRP functions to ensure that Maryland meets its electricity demands at reasonable costs while protecting the state's valuable natural resources. It provides a continuing program for evaluating electric generation issues and recommending responsible, long-term solutions.
