= Savage River State Forest =

Protected area in Maryland, United States

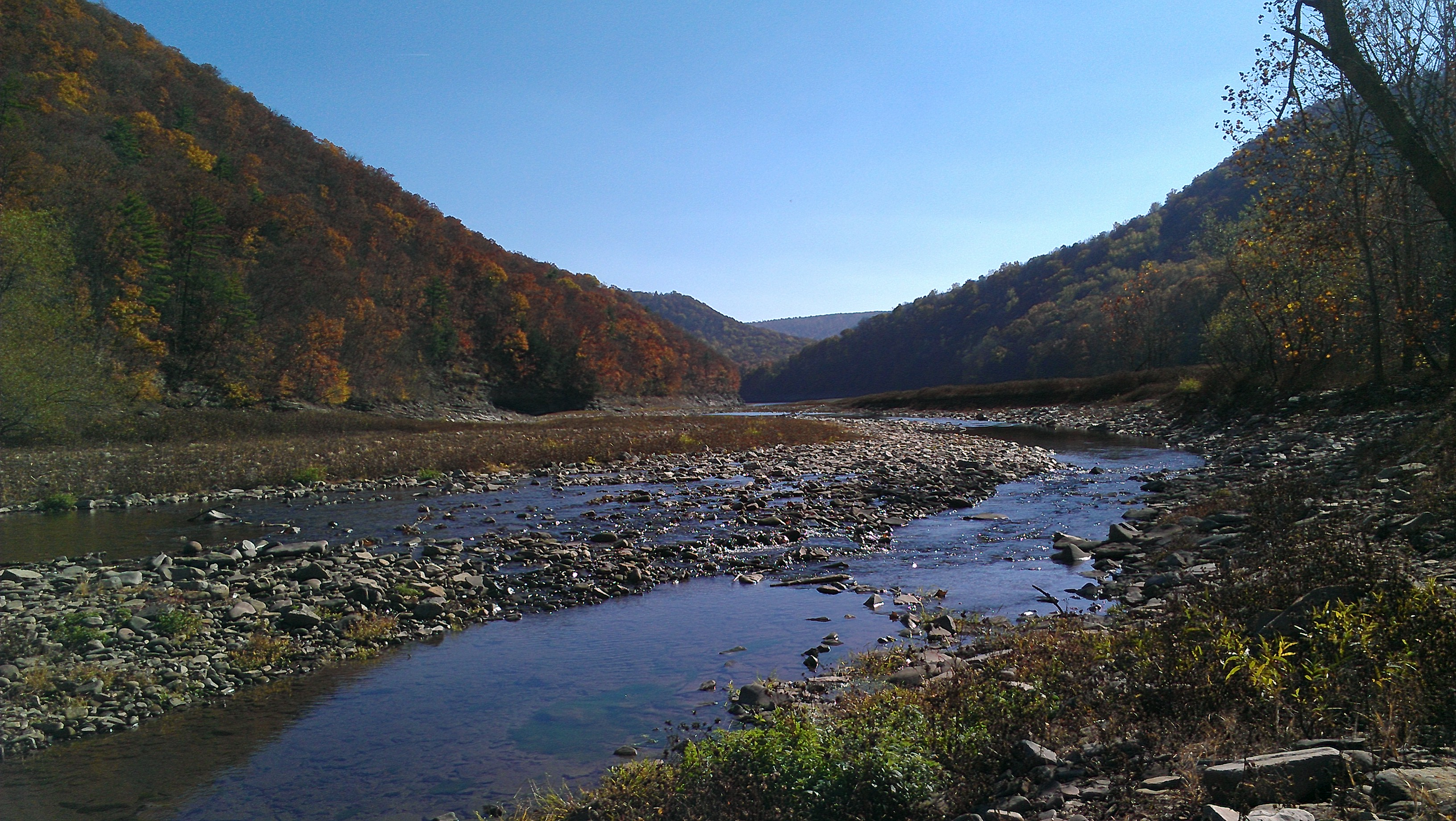
- View of Savage River

- Location within the United States
- Location: Garrett County, Maryland, United States
- Nearest city: Grantsville, MD
- Coordinates: 39°35′59.4″N 79°3′17″W
- Area: 54,000 acres (220 km^{2})
- Established: January 8, 1929
- Governing body: Department of Natural Resources
- Website: www.dnr.state.md.us

Savage River State Forest is located in the north and northeastern part of Garrett County, in the U.S. state of Maryland. The state forest has many waterways, including Savage River Reservoir, which was built in 1952 by the U.S. Army. The dam was built as an emergency water supply for Washington, D.C. Savage River State Forest is known for its hunting, fishing, camping, and hiking trails.

Savage River State Forest is mostly located on the eastern side of the Eastern Continental Divide, which means that most of its waterways will eventually lead to the Potomac River and thus the Chesapeake Bay. But some of its waterways flow into the Youghiogheny River.

== History ==
In 1800, there were roughly 1000 settlers who lived in Garrett County. But cheap land, improved transportation and growth along the eastern seaboard led to a settlement boom. The national road was completed in 1818 and the rail road arrived in 1852. The transportation system better connected the resource rich Garrett County to the growth needs of the east. Increased quantities of lumber, coal and wheat were shipped east.

By the early 1900s, narrow gauge railroads were used to facilitate logging on steeper slopes as the demand for wood products continued to increase. The result was that Garrett County was heavily cut-over, essentially clear cut, within a 20-year period. The train engines frequently caused forest fires in the tops and slash that were left from the clear-cutting. As a result of the fires, a new forest was created. This legacy we can see today as most of our older forests are the same age and are approximately 100 years old.

In part, as a reaction to the rapid cutting of trees and the burning that was taking place, the Garrett Brothers, in 1906 gave 2000 acres to the state with the proviso that an agency would be created to manage the property and to institute scientific forestry- this led to the birth of the Maryland Forest Service. The rapid exploitation of the forests came to an end by the 1930s and logging companies moved west or converted to coal mining. The early efforts of the MD Forest Service were primarily fire suppression.

On January 8, 1929, the state purchased 9,352 acres of cut-over forest land from the N.U. Bond Company. This was the beginning of Savage River State Forest. Since that time there has been a number of acquisitions both big and small. Now Savage River State Forest consists of 54,324 acres.

In the 1930s, the Civilian Conservation Corps assisted the forest service with fire suppression efforts, tree planting, and constructing facilities for recreational activities. The CCC boys helped with the early snow skiing activities on the forest – later to become New Germany State Park. They helped build many trails where hiking, biking, horseback riding, and ORV riding are still taking place.

== The forest ==
The Savage River State Forest covers approximately 54,324 acres of land in Garrett County (40 acres are in Allegany County). Mature mixed oak and northern hardwood forests comprise a large proportion of the Savage River State Forest. In general, sixty-six percent of the area is composed of older, more mature forests, while thirty-four percent are younger and smaller.

Forest Diversity of Savage River State Forest
Structure stage	Total	% Total
Forest Type		
Hemlock	2,097.0	3.9
Northern hardwood	9,121.8	17.1
Hardwood hard pine	104.8	0.2
Mixed oaks	30,091.4	56.3
Cove hardwoods	4,927.9	9.2
Red maple	2,726.1	5.1
Black locust	1,153.3	2.2
Hardwood white pine	315.5	0.6
Hardwood	104.8	0.2
Plantations	2,830.9	5.3
Total	53,472.6	100.0

=== Old growth ===
Old growth forests have generally been defined as forests in existence since pre-settlement times and lacking any significant Euro-American disturbance. The definition can differ according to climatic and eco-regional perspectives and the growth characteristics of specific native forest systems. In Maryland, an old growth forest is defined as a minimum of five acres in size with a preponderance of old trees, of which the oldest trees exceed at least half of the projected maximum attainable age for that species, and that exhibits most of the following characteristics:

1. Shade tolerant species are present in all age/size classes.
2. There are randomly distributed canopy gaps.
3. There is a high degree of structural diversity characterized by multiple growth layers (canopy, understory trees, shrub, herbaceous, ground layers) that reflect a broad spectrum of ages.
4. There is an accumulation of dead wood of varying sizes and stages of decomposition, standing and down, accompanied by decadence in live dominant trees.
5. Pit-and-mound topography can be observed, if the soil conditions permit it.

It is also important to recognize that old-growth forests are not static and may not be a permanent fixture on the landscape. The forests and trees within and around them change continuously. This would be true even if human influence could be eliminated. All forests, including old-growth, succumb to natural, destructive disturbances and regenerate over time. A functional old-growth ecosystem includes the loss of old trees due to natural disturbances and the death of old trees. An old-growth system is not static, nor is it always dominated by old trees. Natural processes dictate the age composition at any time. The important factor in this process is that the trees have the opportunity to reach old age if natural disturbances do not intercede.

=== Forest production ===
Savage River State Forest has been managed for industrial forest production for decades and has served as a significant contributor to the region's forest products industry. Local sawmills and the New Page paper mill provide outlets for timber harvested from area forests. The state forest accounts for approximately 19.0% of productive forestland in the Garrett County area. The neighboring Potomac-Garrett State Forest is managed in a comparable manner, and together the two state properties represent nearly 25.4% of the county's total forest cover.

Savage River SF and Potomac-Garrett SF as a Percentage of Garrett County
State Forest	State Forest acres	SF as a % of County Area	SF as a % of County forest
Savage River	54,324	12.8%	19.0%
Potomac-Garrett	18,242	4.3%	6.4%
Totals	72,566	17.1%	25.4%

== Watershed ==
Savage River State Forest spans six of Maryland's 8-digit watersheds. Three of these, the Savage River, Upper North Branch of the Potomac River, and George's Creek, drain into the Chesapeake Bay, while the remaining three, the Casselman River, Youghiogheny River, and Deep Creek Lake, belong to the Ohio River drainage. The largest share of the forest lies within the Savage River watershed, which contains 57.8% of the forest's area. The Casselman River watershed holds 17.9%, George's Creek 12.7%, and the Youghiogheny River 10.7%. The Upper North Branch of the Potomac and Deep Creek Lake watersheds each contain very small portions, at 0.6% and 0.4% respectively.

Number of stream miles according to the Strahler stream order and grouped by major drainage
Watershed	1st	2nd	3rd	4th	5th
George's Creek	55.8775	15.08063	12.91313	0	0
Potomac River Upper North Branch	90.67313	22.13625	7.47625	33.07813	0
Savage River	96.27	21.82875	16.80875	4.98	0
Chesapeake Bay	242.8206	59.04563	37.19813	38.05813	0
Casselman	60.95938	22.23813	13.105	0	0
Deep Creek Lake	24.4425	2.94125	1.70625	0	0
Youghiogheny River	166.7556	52.50938	30.00625	7.078125	19.84125
Ohio River	252.1575	77.68875	44.8175	7.078125	19.84125
Grand Total	494.9781	136.7344	82.01563	45.13625	19.84125

== Wildlife ==
Maryland began licensing hunters in 1916, with sales peaking at approximately 180,000 in the early 1970s. Since then, figures have declined to around 135,000, with roughly 3–4% of Maryland residents now participating in hunting. Most Maryland hunters are males between the ages of 30 and 49 who live in urban areas. Residents of Baltimore County accounted for 11.9% of statewide licenses sold, while the five lower shore counties together accounted for 9.7%

The majority of Savage River State Forest is open to public hunting, with the exception of safety zones and similar restricted areas. White-tailed deer represents the primary hunting opportunity, though black bear, turkey, and upland birds are also hunted depending on location.

Garrett County is home to more than 40 species of game animals. Hunting remains a long-standing tradition in the area, providing recreation, food, and quality of life. The large amounts of public land in the county make it a popular destination for non-resident hunters and those from more densely populated areas with limited hunting access.

=== White-tailed deer ===
During the 2009–10 hunting season, Garrett County recorded the seventh highest deer harvest in Maryland, a notable ranking given that most counties operate under more liberal bag limits and thus have greater harvest potential. The total reported harvest for Garrett County during that season was 4,922 deer.

=== Black bear ===
In October 2004, the Maryland Department of Natural Resources (DNR) implemented the state's first bear-hunting season in 51 years, with hunts held annually since that time. DNR established a harvest quota targeting approximately 8 to 12% harvest mortality, based on an objective of achieving 20 to 25% overall mortality when combining seasonal and non-seasonal mortality. Harvest quotas ranged from 30 to 85 bears between 2004 and 2009, and the quota range for the 2010 season was set at 65–90 bears.

In May and June 2005, DNR conducted western Maryland’s most recent black bear population survey. A DNA-based mark-recapture study was conducted across Garrett and Allegany counties. A similar study had been conducted in 2000. The results of the DNA analysis were entered into Program MARK which yielded a population estimate of 362 adult and subadult bears across the study area. The 95% CI ranged between 242 and 482 animals.

=== Wild turkey ===
Garrett County observes a split turkey season with both spring and fall components. Statewide, it is estimated that more than 10,000 hunters pursue turkeys during the spring season. In 2010, Garrett County ranked first in the state for turkey harvest, with 345 birds reported, representing approximately 12% of the total statewide harvest.

=== Migratory birds ===
Waterfowl associated with wetlands

Significant waterfowl habitat exists throughout Garrett County. Bottomland hardwood floodplains, beaver impoundments, lakes, farm ponds, and wooded wetlands provide habitat for wood ducks, mallards, teal, and black ducks.

==== American woodcock ====
Spring singing ground surveys coordinated by the U.S. Fish and Wildlife Service indicate that American woodcock populations have declined at an average rate of 1.9% per year since the surveys began in 1968, though population estimates have been stable over the most recent ten-year period. Most woodcock biologists attribute the longer-term decline to habitat alteration, development losses, and changes resulting from the maturation of abandoned farmland. Areas of Savage River State Forest serve as both breeding and wintering habitat for woodcock. The species favors moist soil areas with dense seedling and sapling cover and rich humus layers, as these conditions support earthworms, their primary food source.

=== Fish ===
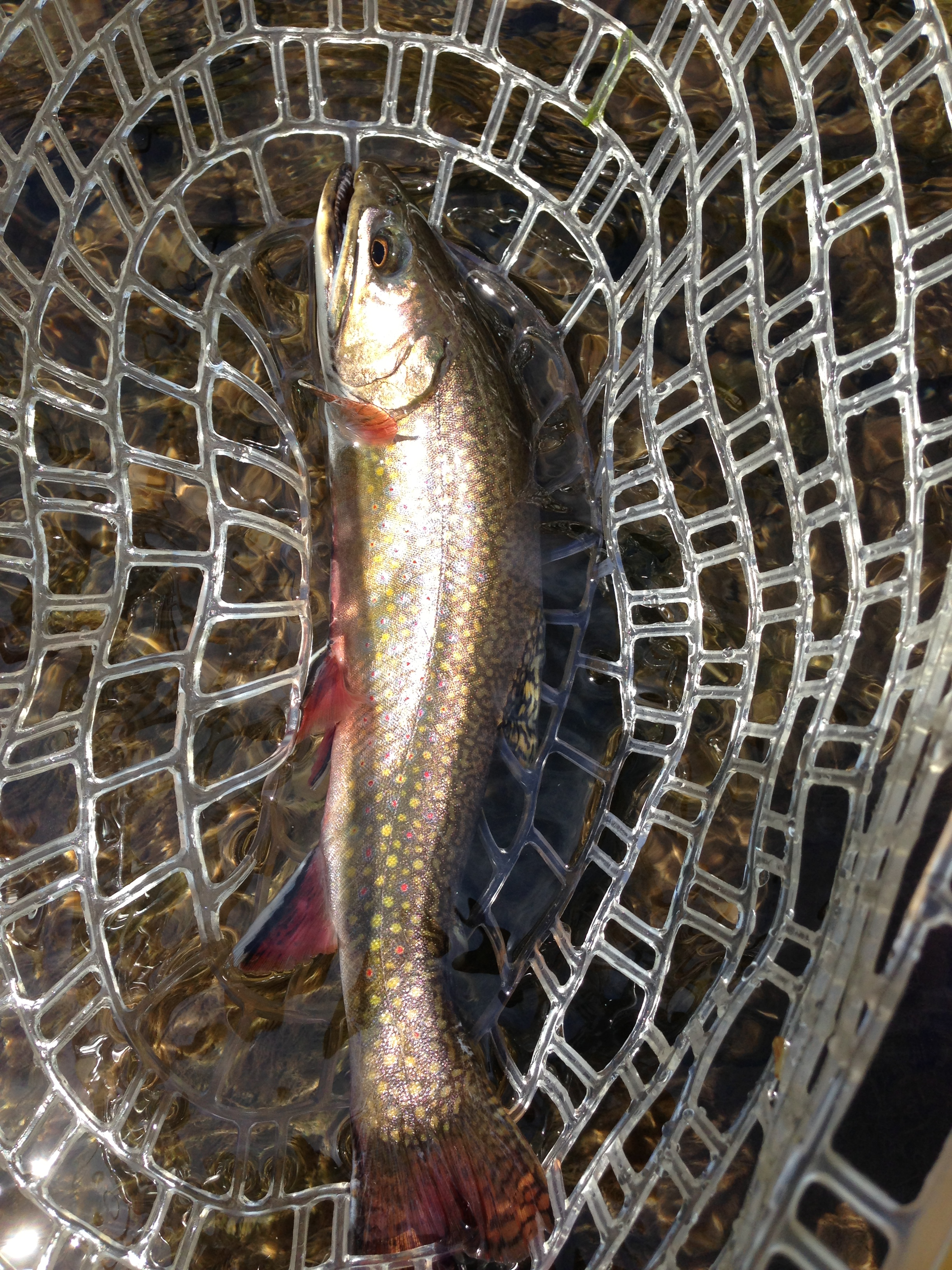
Brook trout in net

==== Brook trout ====
Brook trout are Maryland's only native freshwater trout species, valued for aesthetic, recreational, economic, and biological reasons. Their presence is typically associated with pristine, high-quality environments. Although no commercial fishery for brook trout exists, recreational angling has occurred for centuries, and recognition of the unique quality of native brook trout fishing has grown at both local and national levels.

Human alteration of Maryland's landscape over the past several centuries, including forest clear-cutting, agricultural expansion, and urbanization, has caused brook trout to disappear from 62% of their historic habitat in the state. Of the 151 remaining populations, more than half are found in Garrett County, the westernmost, most mountainous, and least developed part of Maryland. The vast majority of these remaining populations, approximately 82%, are classified as "greatly reduced," meaning they occupy only 1% to 10% of the sub-watershed area they historically inhabited. An additional challenge for management is that only 11% of all brook trout streams and stream miles fall entirely within state lands; the remainder exist on private land or a mix of private and public holdings.

Among immediate threats, urbanization poses the most serious risk: brook trout populations cannot survive in watersheds where human land use exceeds 18%, and are typically eliminated where impervious surface area surpasses 0.5%. Over the longer term, global warming represents the gravest concern. Current projections suggest that rising water temperatures over the next century could eliminate brook trout populations across the state by 2100, with the exception of western Maryland in Garrett County.

== Geography ==
Oakland, Maryland

Climate chart (precipitation, max. and min. temperature)
J	F	M	A	M	J	J	A	S	O	N	D
3.5 37 23	3.3 39 26	4.1 56 39	3.9 54 37	5.1 69 53	4.4 71 54	5.5 78 62	3.8 74 58	3.5 67 51	3.2 57 42	3.8 41 30	3.9 39 29
- █ Average max. and min. temperatures in °F
- █ Precipitation totals in inches
- Source: Wunderground,
Metric conversion
J	F	M	A	M	J	J	A	S	O	N	D
90 3 −5	85 4 −3	105 13 4	98 12 3	131 21 12	112 22 12	139 26 17	96 23 14	88 19 11	80 14 6	97 5 −1	98 4 −2
- █ Average max. and min. temperatures in °C
- █ Precipitation totals in mm

Savage River State Forest is located on the East-central edge of the Allegheny Mountain region of the Appalachian Plateau in the Appalachian Mountains. To the West is Deep Creek Lake State Park, Swallow Falls State Park, and Garrett State Forest; to the North is New Germany State Park and Casselman River Bridge State Park; to the East is Dan’s Mountain State Park; to the South is Potomac State Forest; and Big Run State Park is located within the forest’s grounds. Nearby notable mountains include Backbone Mountain, Big Savage Mountain, Conway Hill, Elder Hill, George Mountain, Lewis Knob, Little Mountain, Little Savage Mountain, Marsh Hill, Meadow Mountain, Negro Mountain, Rich Hill, Roman Nose Mountain, Snaggy Hill, Whites Knob, and Zehner Hill.

=== Soil ===
Despite the streams and valleys that run through much of the forest, most of the soils are acidic and naturally low in plant nutrients such as nitrogen, potassium, and phosphorus. The soil is often steep and stony and is ideally suited for woodlands, wildlife habitat, and recreation. Water drainage is often stunted; locally called “glades” (poorly drained areas) are abundant throughout the forest and surrounding region. Peat covers most of the ground, reaching up to 9 feet deep at some points.

=== Biodiversity ===
The many streams that run through Savage River State Forest serves as habitat for many types of rare and/or endangered species, such as: Johnny darter, striped shiner, mottled sculpin, stonecat, brook trout and hellbender. The brook trout population in Savage River State Forest is among the healthiest in Maryland and stonecats have only been found in the Casselman River that runs to Pennsylvania. Non-native species have also been found in the watersheds of the grounds, such as the fathead minnow, brown trout, rainbow trout, smallmouth bass, rock bass, pumpkinseed, and bluegill.

Larger wildlife includes white-tailed deer, black bears, wild turkey, ruffed grouse, and various small furbearing mammals such as canids, opossums, rodents, and skunks. Additionally, birds that populate the area include wood ducks, bald and golden eagles, mallards, black ducks, woodcocks, and neo-tropical migratory birds.

== Recreation ==
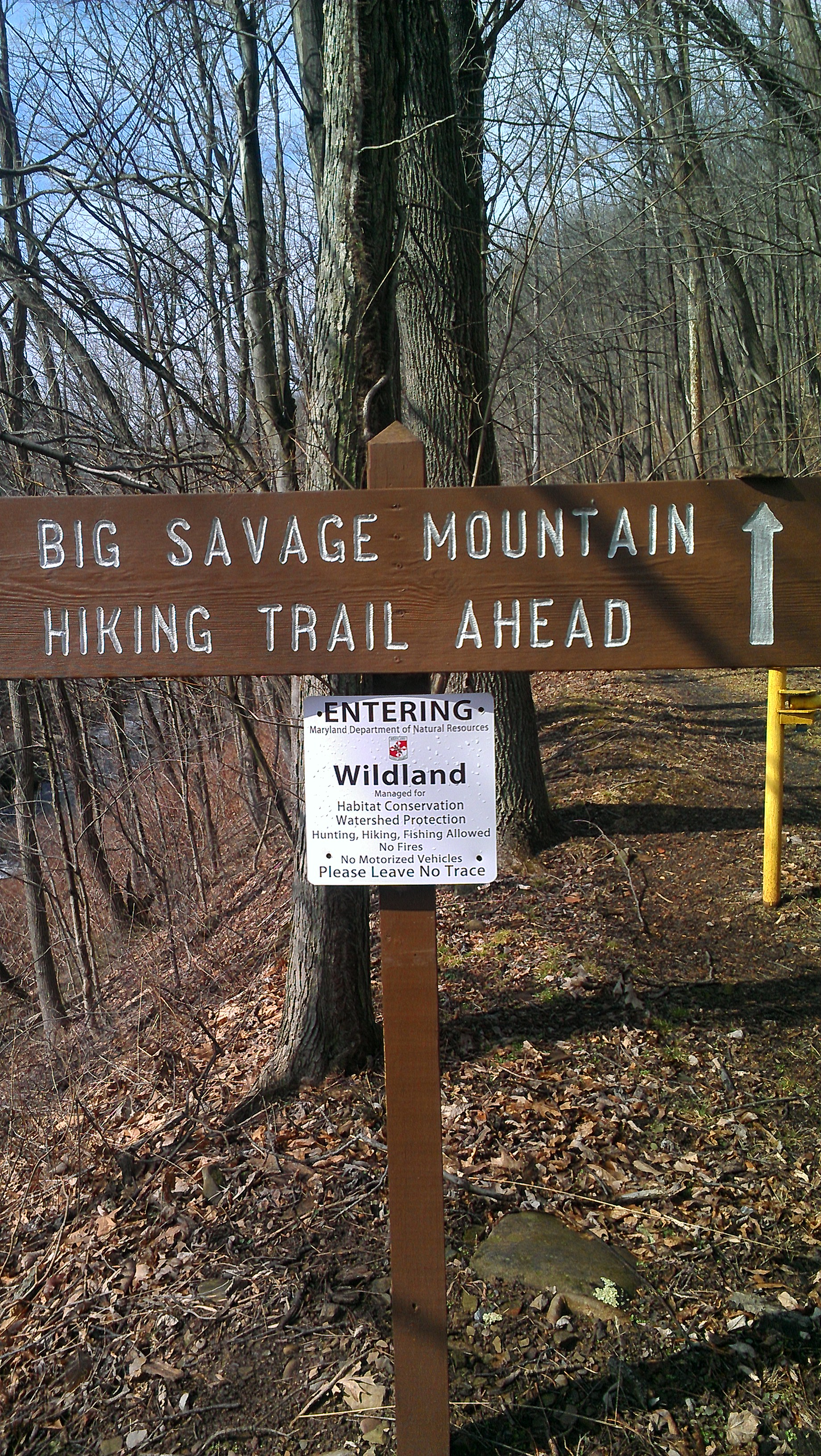
Big Savage Hiking Trail

Savage River State Forest has over 54,000 acres for many recreational activities. There are biking trails, boat launches, cross country skiing, campsites, fishing, flat water canoeing, hiking trails, hunting, picnics, snowmobiling, and white water canoeing.

=== Trails ===
There are ten trails at Savage River State Forest totaling 78 miles. It is recommended that trail users should wear blaze orange during hunting season.

- Meadow Mountain Trail: 12 miles –moderate
- Monroe Run Trail: 6.4 miles - moderate
- Negro Mountain Trail: 8 miles - difficult
- Big Savage Trail: 17 miles - difficult
- Margraff Trails: 7.5 miles - moderate
- Mt. Aetna Tract Trails: 7.6 miles –moderate
- Asa Durst Trails: 4.5 miles - moderate
- Backpacker Loop: 24 miles – moderate
- Poplar Lick Trail: 6 miles – moderate
- New Germany Trails: 10 miles – easy to difficult

=== Hunting, trapping and fishing ===
Savage River State Forest is one of the most used public lands for hunting. White-tailed deer is the most common species hunted in the forest and throughout the state. "A recent survey sponsored by the Association of Fish and Wildlife Agencies found that deer hunting in 2006 generated over $113 million in retail sales, with a total multiplier effect of over $190 million contributed to Maryland’s economy. Deer hunting in Maryland supports nearly 2,300 jobs and generates $71 million in salaries, wages, and business owner’s income, $15 million in state and local tax revenue, and $16 million in federal tax revenue."

"Hunting with rifles, handguns, shotguns, bows and muzzleloaders are permitted in all designated areas in accordance with state and federal laws. Possession or use of weapons is prohibited in State Forests outside of regular hunting seasons. Target shooting is prohibited except at the rifle range. All game birds and game mammals with open seasons may be hunted. Tree stands or blinds are limited to those of a temporary nature, which must be removed or dismantled at the end of each day. The hunting season in State Forests conforms to standard hunting seasons adopted by state and federal regulations."

A rifle range, located on New Germany Road, provides opportunity to target practice and for sighting in firearms prior to the hunting season.

Trapping on portions of the Savage River State Forest for furbearers is permitted through the issuance of a trapping permit.

Savage River State Forest offers many fishing areas in the Savage River Reservoir, and the tail waters that follow. The river is stocked 5-6 times per year and is usually stocked with trout. Some of the species of fish you can catch at Savage River include, large and small mouth bass, trout, yellow perch, blue gill, pickerel, musky and many more.

=== Hiking, biking, horseback riding, nature observation and off-road vehicles ===
Savage River State Forest offers an extensive forest road system for hiking, biking, horseback rising, and observing nature.

=== Canoeing and kayaking ===
Savage River offers white water rafting, flat-water boating, and canoeing. No gasoline motors are allowed on the reservoir.

=== Camping ===
Savage River State Forest currently has 72 campsites. Designated camping areas include Big Run Road, Savage River Road, Westernport Road (Elk Lick), Blue Lick Road, Poplar Lick Trail, and Whitewater sites. If you do not want to stay at one of the camping sites you are allowed to backcountry backpack, with a pass, throughout the entire forest.
