= Black Walnut, Missouri =

Unincorporated community in Missouri, U.S.

Coordinates: 38°52′24″N 90°22′16″W

Black Walnut is an unincorporated community in St. Charles County, in the U.S. state of Missouri.

== History ==
A post office called Black Walnut was established in 1875, and remained in operation until 1908. The community was named for a grove of black walnut timber near the original town site.
