= Savage River Reservoir =

Savage Reservoir
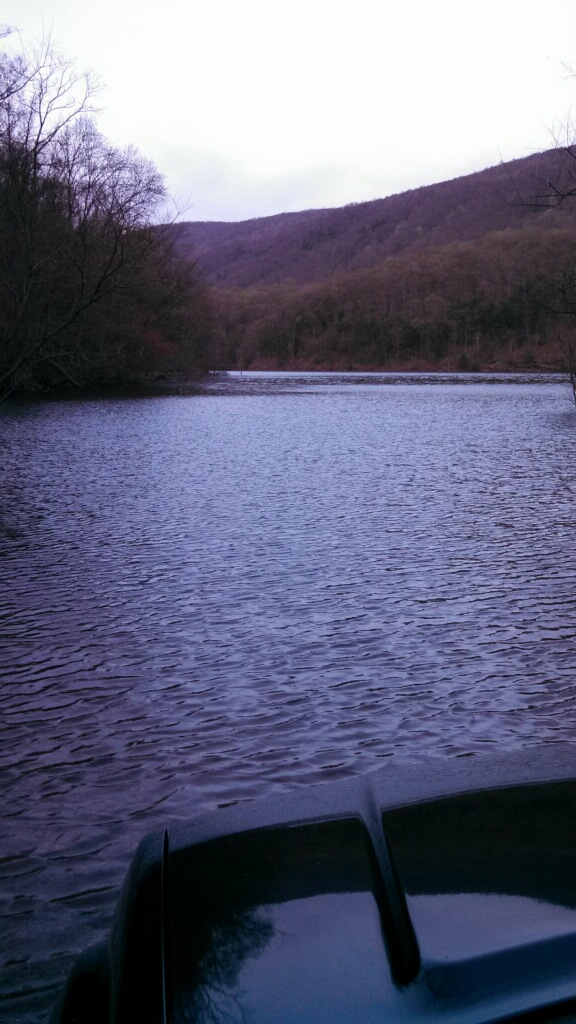
- Mouth of the Savage River Reservoir

- Location within Maryland Location within the United States
- Location: Garrett County, Maryland
- Coordinates: 39°30′26″N 79°7′56″W
- Type: reservoir
- Primary inflows: Savage River
- Primary outflows: Savage River
- Catchment area: 105 sq mi (270 km^{2})
- Basin countries: United States
- Surface area: 360 acres (1.5 km^{2})
- Water volume: 20,000 acre⋅ft (25,000,000 m^{3}) Normal 31,800 acre⋅ft (39,200,000 m^{3}) Max
- Surface elevation: 1,463 ft (446 m)

The Savage River Reservoir is a 360 acres (1.5 km^{2}) storage reservoir in northwest Maryland. It was completed in 1952 by the U.S. Army Corps of Engineers, and is owned and maintained by the Upper Potomac River Commission. The reservoir was formed by the Savage River Dam which impounds the Savage River. The reservoir itself has a maximum capacity of 31,800 acre-feet (39,200,000 m^{3}) and is used for flood control and municipal drinking water supply.

The Savage River Dam is a rock-fill, earthen dam, 184 feet (56 m) high, 1,050 feet (320 m) long and receives runoff from an area of 105 square miles (270 km^{2}). The dam was modified in 1980.

Dimensions:

- Height: 184 feet (56 m)
- Length: 1,050 feet (320 m)
- Capacity: 31,800 acre-feet (39,200,000 m^{3})
- Normal storage: 20,000 acre-feet (25,000,000 m^{3})
- Drainage area: 105 square miles (270 km^{2})
- Maximum discharge: 97,200 cubic feet per second (2,750 m^{3}/s)

In 2007, operation of the reservoir gates failed due to extensive corrosion. Around $3.9 million of Recovery Act funds were used to drain, repair and reopen the reservoir in 2010. There has been a gradual recovery of what is now referred to as a "trophy area" for fishermen below the dam. Big Run has public facilities at the headwaters of the lake. In April 2009, Savage River Reservoir was named one of the top five Maryland Fishing Waters as well as one of the top 100 rivers by Trout Unlimited. Savage River below the dam is popular for canoeing competitions and is treasured for its clear water. The Savage River primarily flows into the Reservoir, providing fishing and paddling opportunities in a scenic, wilderness setting. Two boat launches located near the dam provide convenient access. Fishermen can enjoy fishing for catfish, trout and bass. In 2008, a population study resulted in the finding that there was an estimated 1,376 wild adult trout per mile in the river. The Reservoir holds the Rainbow Trout state record weighing in at 14 lbs. 3 oz. Savage River flows south to the Potomac River, where it drops 85 ft per mile. With this descent, it is favored by both fishermen and advanced paddlers. The Potomac River runs through Maryland, West Virginia and Virginia, and eventually into the Chesapeake Bay.
