= Maryland Department of Natural Resources =

State agency of Maryland, United States

State Agency overview
- Formed: 1969; 57 years ago
- Jurisdiction: State of Maryland public lands
- Headquarters: Annapolis, Maryland, United States
- State Agency executive: Josh Kurtz, Agency Secretary
- Website: https://dnr.maryland.gov/

The Maryland Department of Natural Resources (DNR) is a government agency in the state of Maryland charged with maintaining natural resources including state parks, public lands, state forests, state waterways, wildlife, and recreation areas. Its headquarters are in Annapolis.

== Department responsibilities ==
The Department's principal functions are:

- Managing over 461,000 acres (1,870 km^{2}) of public lands
- Protecting over 17,000 miles (27,000 km) of waterways
- Lead agency for restoration of the Chesapeake Bay and coastal bays.

DNR does not issue or enforce environmental permits under the federal Clean Air Act, Clean Water Act, Resource Conservation and Recovery Act and related laws. Those functions are the responsibility of the Maryland Department of the Environment (MDE).

== History ==
DNR was established in 1969 as part of a reorganization of the Maryland executive branch initiated by the 56th Governor of Maryland, Marvin Mandel (1969–1979). DNR assumed the responsibilities formerly held by the Maryland Board of Natural Resources that had been established in 1941. The reorganization consolidated the agency's authority under a single cabinet-level department secretary.

Although Maryland's DNR was officially established in 1969, the first ever origins of the Department of Natural Resources was conducted in an 1834 geologic land survey, according to the Maryland State Archives

The first DNR secretary was former-Governor J. Millard Tawes, who served in that capacity until 1971. Other notable DNR secretaries have included James Coulter (1971–1983) and Torrey C. Brown (1983–1995). The department is headquartered in the Tawes State Office Building in Annapolis.

== Organization ==
=== Leadership and mission ===
DNR Agency Secretary Josh Kurtz was appointed in January 2023.

The Mission Support offices include Human Resources Services, Leadership/Employee Development, Office of Fair Practices, Licensing and Registration Services, Finance and Administration Service, Audit and Management Review, and Information Technology.

=== Land resources ===
Land Resources includes the Park Service, Forest Service, Wildlife and Heritage Service, Land Acquisition and Planning, Engineering and Construction, and the Maryland Environmental Trust.

==== Maryland Park Service ====
The mission of the Maryland Park Service is to manage the natural, cultural, historical, and recreational resources to provide for stewardship and the enjoyment by people. The Service manages 66 state parks. Services include camping, biking, boating and fishing, hiking, outdoor programs, and exploring natural resources. The Service consists of both civilian and law enforcement rangers.

==== Wildlife and forestry ====
DNR closely regulates wildlife, tracking diseases and populations. During the previous hunting season, there was a lone-reported case of a hunter legally taking a deer only to find out later that the deer tagged was infected with Chronic Wasting Disease, CWD. CWD is a neurological disease that affect deer elk and moose, where the infected have symptoms such as loss of body condition, behavioral abnormalities, and even death (Learn). People are warned to avoid contact with the brain, spinal cord, and lymph nodes because these are the areas that become infected. To help control this problem, each year the MD-DNR takes samples from the deer harvested to test for any signs of CWD. The main focus is in the western Maryland counties due to the reports of CWD in West Virginia and Virginia (Communications, 2011).

The DNR is also responsible for regulating the 3 million acres (12,000 km^{2}) of wooded land in Maryland. There are over 160 species of trees that help create these millions of acres of forest. This abundant acreage makes the forest industry one of the biggest businesses in the state, with more than 18,000 people reliant on wood products. In the two westernmost counties, Garrett and Allegany, forestry is the largest employer. Over the years there have been many contributing factors that have diminished some of the wooded areas around the state. Since the early 1980s, almost half a million acres (4,000 km^{2}) have been infested with gypsy moths that destroyed forests. There are also the Southern Pine bark beetles that have caused excessive damage to the pine trees on the Eastern Shore. Another reason for damage to the forestry is the cover fires that occur every year. The spring and the fall are the prime times for fires because of the climate changes. There are more than 6,000 fires destroying 8,000–10,000 acres each year in Maryland.

=== Aquatic resources ===
Aquatic Resources includes Chesapeake and Coastal Service, Fishing & Boating Service, Resources Assessment Service, Integrated Policy and Review Commission, and the Critical Area Commission.

==== Streams, coastal waters, and fishing ====
The Maryland Department of Natural Resources has been monitoring the water sources from Chesapeake Bay to the Potomac River and other assorted rivers and streams since 1996. The goal is to manage the restoration and protection of these waterways and ensure Maryland residents get clean water; and can participate in activities such canoeing, fishing, and growing crops. DNR has a research and development team committed to providing the best and cleanest possible water sources. Many researched topics include geomorphic assessments, atmospheric and acid deposition, and long term water quality control.

Maryland's waterways contain many exotic species of fish and other water life. The streams' biodiversity includes fish, birds, salamanders, mussels, ten turtle species, and over 100 species of fish. Plants and vegetation surrounding the aquatic habitats provide nutrients, shelter for animals, temperature regulation, and erosion abatement. DNR has established groups to survey all streams and wildlife. One of these groups is the Monitoring and Non-Tidal Assessment (MANTA), and another is the state's portion of the National Rivers and Streams Assessment—managed nationally by the U.S. Environmental Protection Agency. Both help to keep aquatic areas clean and safe. DNR recognizes commercial and non-commercial fishing; and reports the breeds and sizes of fish caught on their website.

DNR also works with the Maryland Coastal Bays Program, an intergovernmental partnership which implements coastal restoration projects and grants, and provides conservation management planning support.

==== Boating ====
The DNR offers many boating services to people of all ages and types of boaters including paddle, sailing, and power boats. Boating programs are financed completely through the DNR Waterway Improvement Fund, and have developed over 300 public boating areas throughout Maryland. The revenue that is acquired from this fund comes from a five percent vessel tax that is paid when any water-going vessel is licensed in the state of Maryland.

== Natural Resources Police ==
The Natural Resources Police is the law enforcement arm of the Maryland Department of Natural Resources. Police Officers patrol department-managed lands and enforce conservation and boating laws, as well as Maryland's Criminal Law and Transportation Articles. Additional services include homeland security, search and rescue, emergency medical services, and educational programs.

== See also ==
- Maryland power plant research program
- List of Maryland state parks
- List of state and territorial fish and wildlife management agencies in the United States
