= Maryland Route 75 =

State highway in Maryland, US

Maryland Route 75
- Maryland Route 75 highlighted in red

Route information
- Maintained by MDSHA
- Length: 28.40 mi (45.71 km)
- Existed: 1927–present
- Tourist routes: Old Main Streets Scenic Byway

Major junctions
- South end: MD 355 near Hyattstown
- MD 80 near Green Valley; I-70 / US 40 in New Market; MD 144 in New Market; MD 26 in Libertytown; MD 84 near New Windsor
- North end: MD 31 in New Windsor

Location
- Country: United States
- State: Maryland
- Counties: Frederick, Carroll

Highway system
- Maryland highway system; Interstate; US; State; Scenic Byways
← MD 70	→ MD 76

Maryland Route 75 (MD 75) is a state highway in the U.S. state of Maryland. Known for most of its length as Green Valley Road, the state highway runs 28.40 miles (45.71 km) from MD 355 near Hyattstown north to MD 31 in New Windsor. MD 75 serves as the main north–south highway of eastern Frederick County, where it connects Hyattstown with New Market, Libertytown, Johnsville, and the Carroll County town of Union Bridge. The first sections of MD 75 were constructed around New Windsor and between Green Valley and New London in the early 1910s. The latter highway was extended south to Green Valley in the late 1910s. In the early 1920s, MD 75 was constructed between New Windsor and Union Bridge and from Libertytown to Johnsville. The remainder of the state highway was constructed in the late 1920s and early 1930s. MD 75 was relocated between Union Bridge and New Windsor in the early 1960s, around its interchange with Interstate 70 (I-70)/U.S. Route 40 (US 40) in New Market in the early 1970s, and at its northern terminus in New Windsor in 2007.

== Route description ==
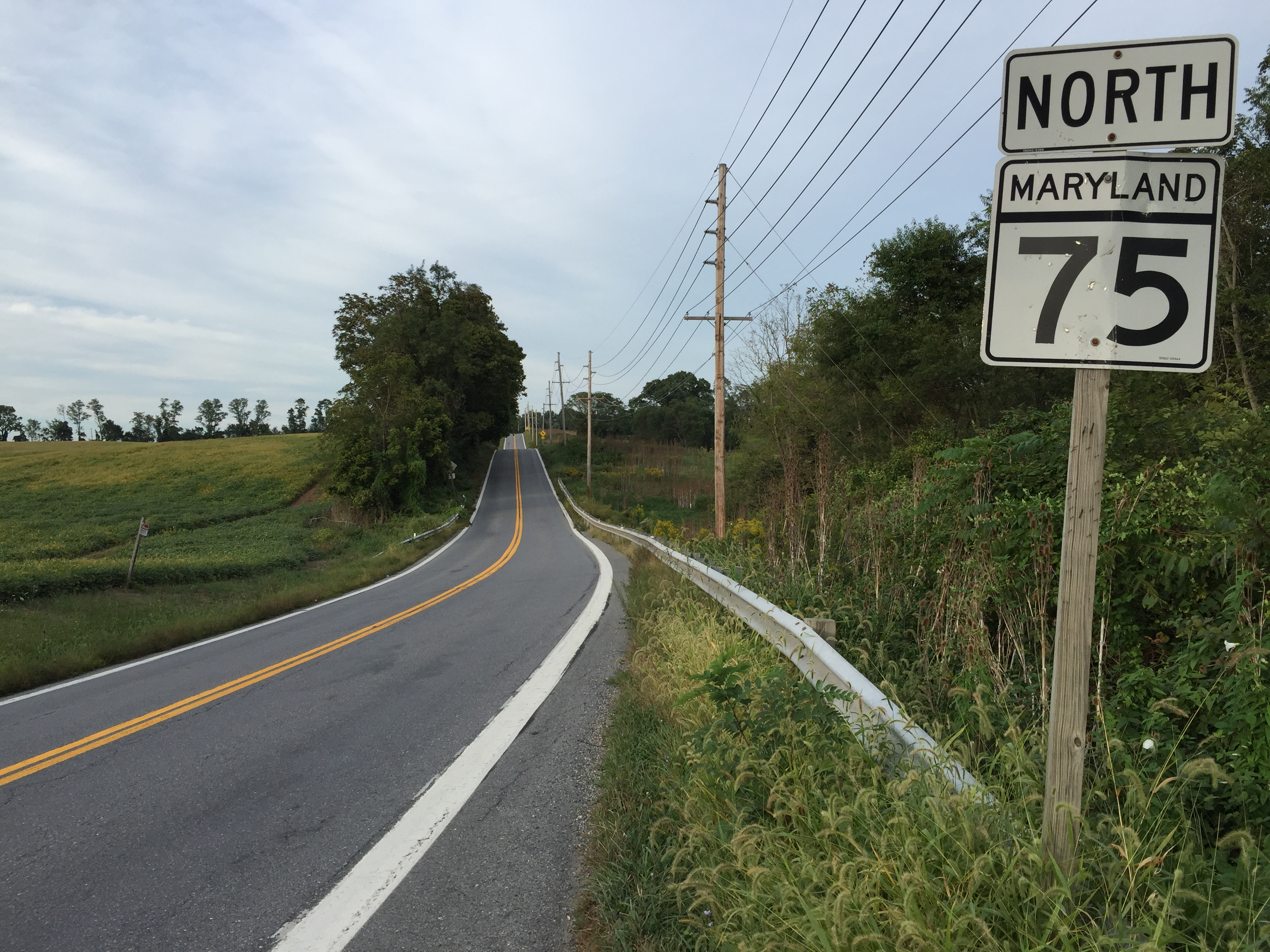
View north at the south end of MD 75 at MD 355 near Hyattstown

MD 75 begins at MD 355 (Urbana Pike) a short distance north of the Frederick–Montgomery county line near Hyattstown, heading northeast on two-lane undivided Green Valley Road. The state highway crosses Bennett Creek and Stillhouse Branch and passes through the village of Green Valley. MD 75 traverses Fahrney Branch before reaching MD 80 (Fingerboard Road), onto which MD 75 turns west for a short concurrency in the hamlet of Fountain Mills. The state highway continues north to the village of Monrovia, where the highway passes through a pair of sharp curves, crosses Bush Creek, and passes under CSX's Old Main Line Subdivision railroad line. At Baldwin Road south of New Market, MD 75 makes a right turn to remain on Green Valley Road while its old alignment continues straight to a dead end. At East Baldwin Road, the state highway heads north of a park and ride lot and makes a left turn onto a four-lane divided highway where the state highway has a diamond interchange with I-70/US 40 (Baltimore National Pike). North of the interchange, MD 75 has an intersection with Old National Pike, which heads west into the town of New Market as MD 144.

North of MD 144, MD 75 reduces to a two-lane undivided road and meets the north end of the old alignment, Old New Market Road. The state highway traverses Bens Branch in the hamlet of New London, which contains the Drummine Farm and Linganore High School on Old Annapolis Road. MD 75 crosses Linganore Creek and parallels Town Branch to the town of Libertytown. The state highway is named Walnut Street and Church Street south and north, respectively, of its intersection with MD 26 (Liberty Road). After passing through Johnsville, which is home of the historic Kitterman-Buckey Farm, MD 75 curves to the east and crosses Beaver Dam Creek. The state highway curves back to the north and traverses Haines Branch before crossing Sams Creek into Carroll County.

MD 75 passes to the west of a cement factory before the highway enters the town of Union Bridge as Main Street. The state highway intersects Locust Street in the center of the Union Bridge Historic District. Locust Street heads east toward the Pipe Creek Friends Meetinghouse and the historic home Hard Lodging, and west toward the historic farm Mount Pleasant. MD 75 crosses the east–west line of the Maryland Midland Railway at-grade east of Union Bridge Station, which now serves as the Western Maryland Railway Historical Society Museum that commemorates the railway's predecessor, the Western Maryland Railway. The state highway crosses Little Pipe Creek, then turns east onto Green Valley Road; Main Street continues north as a municipal highway that leads north to the historic Uniontown Academy and the village of Middleburg.

MD 75 heads east to the south of the historic home Wilson's Inheritance and to the north of the village of Linwood, which has its own historic district south of the rail line. Through Linwood, the state highway is paralleled to the north by its old alignment, MD 800 (Watson Lane). After the eastern junction with MD 800, MD 75 veers southeast and meets the southern end of MD 84 (Clear Ridge Road), which heads north toward Uniontown. The state highway crosses Little Pipe Creek again before reaching its northern terminus at MD 31 on the northern edge of the town of New Windsor. Green Valley Road continues south as eastbound MD 31, while westbound MD 31 heads west from the intersection as High Street.

== History ==
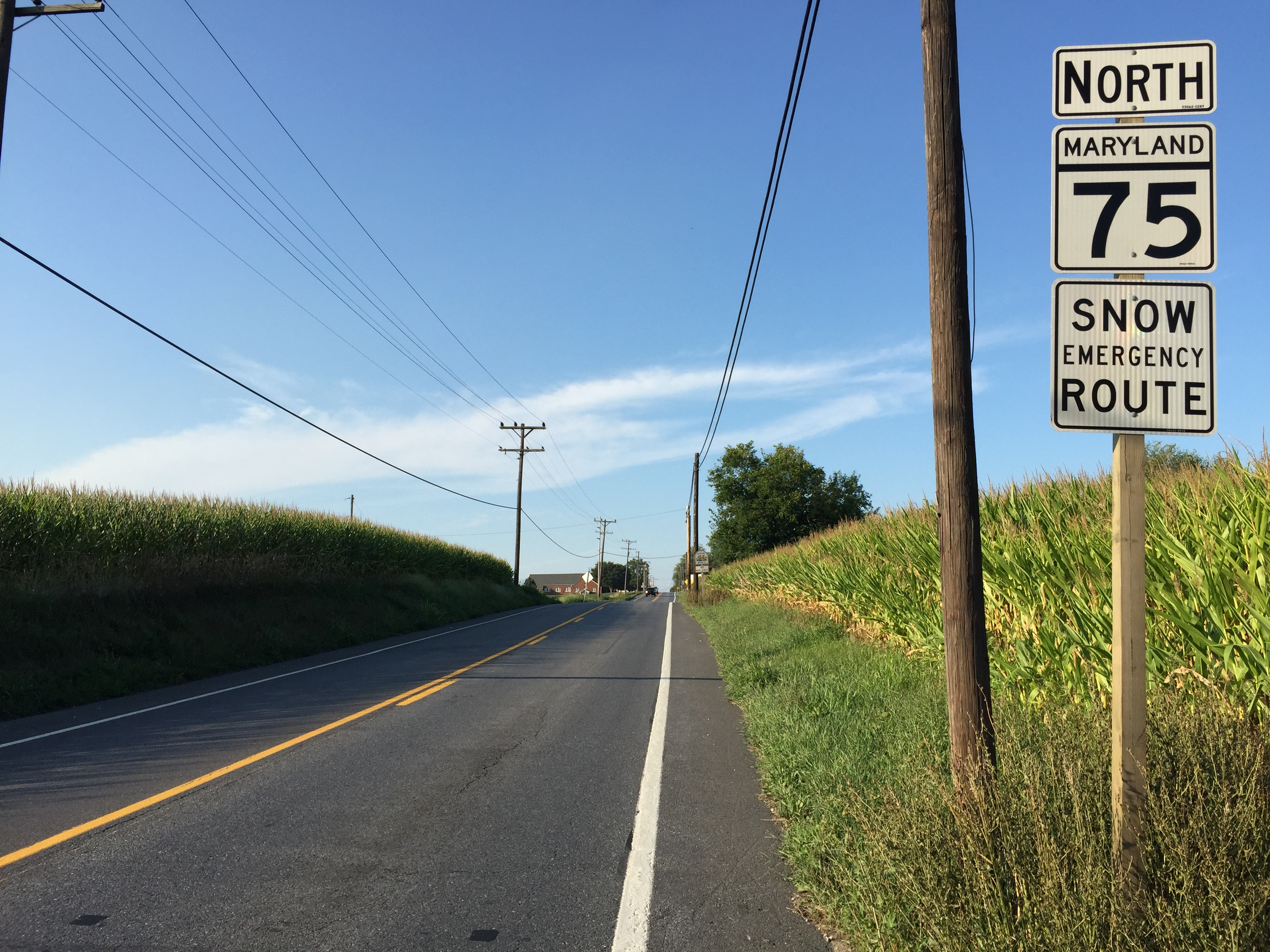
MD 75 northbound south of Union Bridge

A portion of MD 75 was originally the Liberty and Pipe Creek Turnpike from Libertytown to Union Bridge via Johnsville. When the Maryland State Roads Commission laid out its initial system of state roads to be improved in 1909, the highway between Fountain Mills and New London via New Market was included as one of the original state roads. By the end of 1911, the state road was completed from New Market to about 1 mile (1.6 km) south of Monrovia. The remainder of the Fountain Mills – New London road was under construction in 1911 and completed as a 14-foot (4.3 m) macadam road in 1912. The Uniontown Road from New Windsor to near the modern MD 75–MD 84 junction was paved in macadam as a state aid road in 1911. The highway was extended south as a state-aid road from Fountain Mills toward Hyattstown in two sections; the first 1.5-mile (2.4 km) section was completed as a macadam road by 1915. The second section, which would extend the highway to Green Valley, went under contract in 1916 but the contracted company failed after partially completing the road. The macadam road south to Green Valley was completed in 1920.

The highway from the Uniontown Road north of New Windsor to Union Bridge went under construction shortly after 1921 and was completed as a concrete road by 1923; this included paving of Main Street in Union Bridge. A macadam road from Libertytown to Johnsville was also completed around 1923. The concrete road in Union Bridge was extended south across Sams Creek into Frederick County, completing the highway in Carroll County, in 1926 and 1927. The following year, 1 mile (1.6 km) of concrete was built north from New London. In 1929 and 1930, the concrete road being constructed north from New London was extended north a short distance and another concrete segment was started south from Libertytown. Another concrete road was started north from Johnstown toward Union Bridge. The three remaining gaps in modern MD 75—Hyattstown to Green Valley, midway between New London and Libertytown, and midway between Johnsville and Union Bridge—were under contract by 1930 and completed as concrete roads by 1933.

MD 75's first significant relocation occurred around 1963 when the highway was relocated for several stretches between Union Bridge and New Windsor. The highway's old segments became sections of MD 800; in addition, MD 84 was extended south along part of old MD 75 to meet new MD 75 just north of New Windsor. The second major relocation occurred around New Market. The present alignment of I-70 through New Market had been constructed as a non-freeway four-lane divided highway for US 40 between 1953 and 1955. MD 75 was relocated to the east of New Market when I-70 was upgraded to a freeway through the town, which included the modern I-70–MD 75 interchange, in 1973 and 1974. This relocation resulted in the old alignment north of Main Street in New Market becoming a section of MD 874 and the present alignment south of the Interstate with its two right-angle turns. Finally, MD 75's eastern terminus was moved in New Windsor as a result of the relocation of MD 31 through the town in 2007. MD 31 originally entered town from the southwest along High Street, then turned east at Main Street. MD 31 was rerouted to follow High Street north to Green Valley Road at MD 75's present terminus, follow Green Valley Road south to Main Street at MD 75's old terminus, then turn east onto Main Street. The stretch of Main Street between its two intersections with MD 31 was designated MD 831J.

== Junction list ==
County	Location	mi	km	Destinations	Notes
Frederick	Hyattstown	0.00	0.00	MD 355 (Urbana Pike) – Hyattstown, Urbana	Southern terminus
Frederick	Green Valley	4.83	7.77	MD 80 east (Fingerboard Road) – Damascus	MD 75 turns west onto Fingerboard Road; south end of concurrency with MD 80
Frederick	Green Valley	4.96	7.98	MD 80 west (Fingerboard Road) – Urbana	MD 75 turns north onto Green Valley Road; north end of concurrent with MD 80
Frederick	New Market	8.12	13.07	I-70 / US 40 (Baltimore National Pike) – Frederick, Baltimore	I-70 Exit 62
Frederick	New Market	8.36	13.45	MD 144 west (Old National Pike) / Old National Pike east	Officially MD 144FB; western terminus of MD 144FB
Frederick	Libertytown	15.59	25.09	MD 26 (Liberty Road) – Frederick, Westminster	
Carroll	Union Bridge	24.08	38.75	Main Street north – Middleburg	MD 75 turns east onto Green Valley Road
Carroll	Linwood	25.66	41.30	MD 800 east (Watson Lane)	Western terminus of MD 800; officially MD 800D
Carroll	Linwood	27.06	43.55	MD 800 west (Watson Lane)	Eastern terminus of MD 800
Carroll	New Windsor	27.71	44.59	MD 84 north (Clear Ridge Road) – Uniontown	Southern terminus of MD 84
Carroll	New Windsor	28.40	45.71	MD 31 (High Street/Green Valley Road) – Libertytown, Westminster	Northern terminus
1.000 mi = 1.609 km; 1.000 km = 0.621 mi: Concurrency terminus

== Auxiliary routes ==
- MD 75A is the designation for an unnamed 0.01-mile (0.016 km) spur north from MD 75 north to a barrier between Union Bridge and Linwood. MD 75A was twice as long and connected with MD 800F until the MD 800F was removed from the state highway system in 2004.
- MD 75FB was the designation for an unnamed 0.12-mile (0.19 km) section of old alignment of MD 75 that ran from the intersection of MD 75 and Baldwin Road north to a cul-de-sac south of New Market. The route was transferred to county maintenance on October 31, 2016.
- MD 75FC was the designation for an unnamed 0.02-mile (0.032 km) spur east from MD 75 that served a pair of properties north of Old Annapolis Road in New London. The route was transferred to county maintenance on October 31, 2016.
