= Maryland Route 84 =

State highway in Carroll County, Maryland, US

Maryland Route 84
- Maryland Route 84 highlighted in red

Route information
- Maintained by MDSHA
- Length: 5.75 mi (9.25 km)
- Existed: 1927–present
- Tourist routes: Old Main Streets Scenic Byway

Major junctions
- South end: MD 75 near New Windsor
- North end: MD 832 near Frizzelburg

Location
- Country: United States
- State: Maryland
- Counties: Carroll

Highway system
- Maryland highway system; Interstate; US; State; Scenic Byways
← I-83	→ MD 85

Maryland Route 84 (MD 84) is a state highway in the U.S. state of Maryland. The state highway runs 5.75 miles (9.25 km) from MD 75 near New Windsor north to MD 832 near Frizzelburg. MD 84 provides access to Uniontown and forms part of the connection between New Windsor and Taneytown in western Carroll County. The state highway was constructed from New Windsor to Uniontown in the mid-1920s. The northernmost portion of the highway was constructed in the late 1930s as MD 630, which became a disjoint part of MD 84 in 1951. The gap in MD 84 north of Uniontown was filled in 1956.

== Route description ==
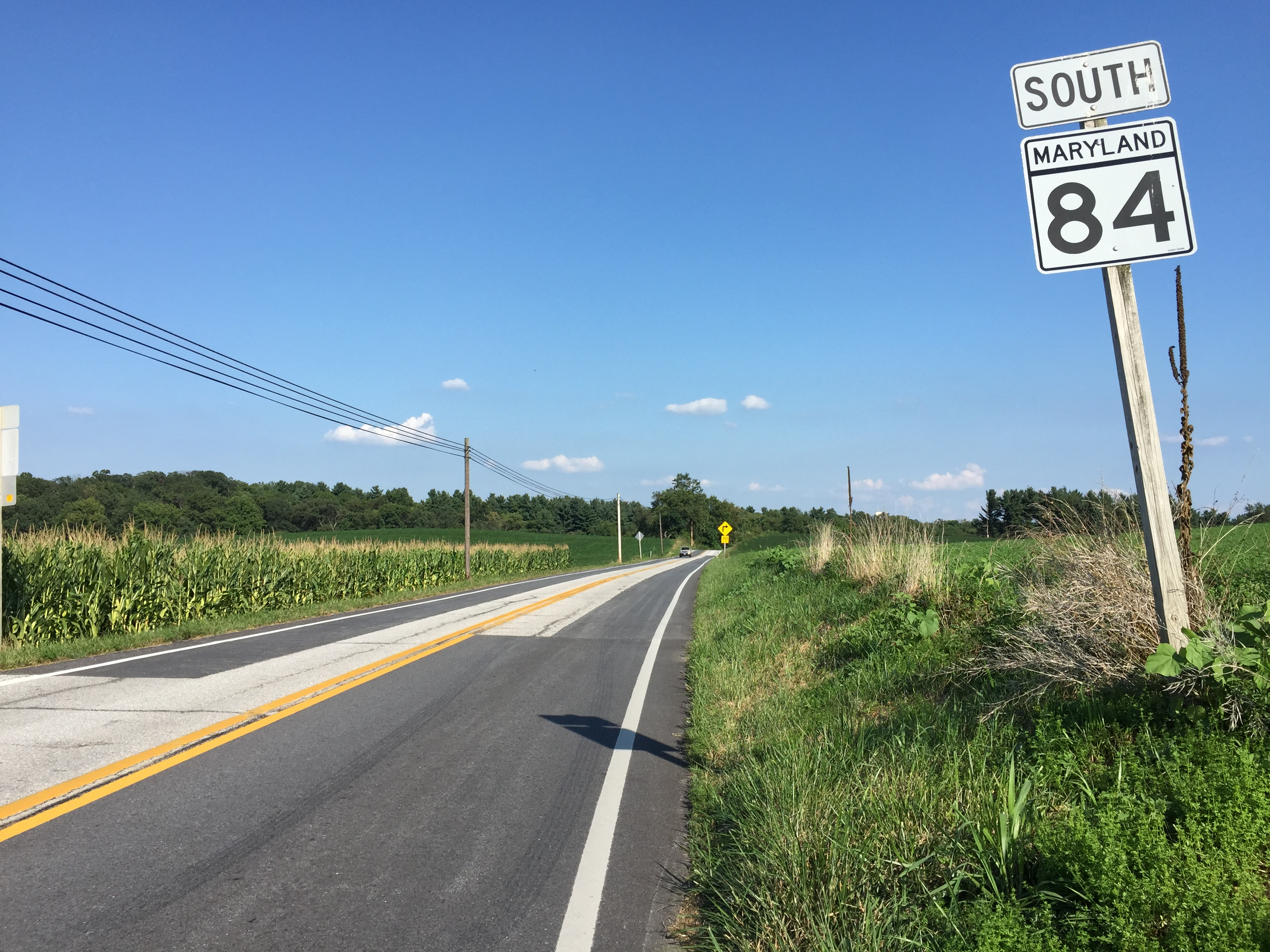
View south along MD 84 north of New Windsor

MD 84 begins at an intersection with MD 75 (Green Valley Road) just north of Little Pipe Creek north of the town of New Windsor. The state highway heads northwest as two-lane undivided Clear Ridge Road. At Clear Ridge Road South, which is unsigned MD 800B and heads southwest, MD 84 turns north through farmland and crosses Roop Branch. The state highway passes through the hamlet of Clear Ridge before entering the village of Uniontown. Within the Uniontown Historic District, MD 84 turns east onto the unincorporated town's main street at Middleburg Road, which heads west toward Middleburg. The state highway turns north onto Trevanion Road while Uniontown Road continues straight east; Uniontown Road passes the Weaver-Fox House within Uniontown and the Robert and Phyllis Scott House and the Englar-Schweigart-Rinehart Farm and Rockland Farm closer to Westminster. North of Uniontown, MD 84 turns east onto Baust Church Road while Trevanion Road continues straight past the namesake historic home on its way to Taneytown. The state highway veers north, passes through several curves, and crosses Meadow Branch. MD 84 reaches its northern terminus at MD 832 (Old Taneytown Road) in the hamlet of Tyrone west of Frizzelburg.

== History ==
Maryland Route 630
- Location: Frizzelburg
- Existed: 1936–1951

The first section of modern MD 84 to be constructed was between modern MD 75 and MD 800B; this section and MD 800B form a segment of MD 75's original alignment that was constructed as a concrete road between 1921 and 1923. The first sections of MD 84 proper, which was then named Uniontown Road, were built in 1924 and 1925; a short section of macadam road was constructed from old MD 75 to Roop Branch and concrete from there to Uniontown. Baust Church Road was improved to a modern highway around 1936 and designated MD 630 by 1939. MD 630 became a disjoint section of MD 84 in 1951. The gap in the state highway was filled in 1956 when the connecting section of Trevanion Road became part of MD 84. MD 84's southern terminus was moved to its present location when MD 75 was relocated between Union Bridge and New Windsor around 1963.

== Junction list ==
The entire route is in Carroll County.

Location	mi	km	Destinations	Notes
New Windsor	0.00	0.00	MD 75 (Green Valley Road) – Union Bridge	Southern terminus
New Windsor	0.44	0.71	Clear Ridge Road South west	Unsigned MD 800B; MD 84 turns north at this intersection
Frizzelburg	5.75	9.25	MD 832 (Old Taneytown Road) – Taneytown, Westminster	Northern terminus
1.000 mi = 1.609 km; 1.000 km = 0.621 mi

== See also ==
- List of roads in Carroll County, Maryland
