= Maryland Route 85 =

State highway in Frederick County, Maryland, US, known as Buckeystown Pike

Maryland Route 85
- Buckeystown Pike
- Maryland Route 85 highlighted in red

Route information
- Maintained by MDSHA
- Length: 10.80 mi (17.38 km)
- Existed: 1970–present
- Tourist routes: Antietam Campaign Scenic Byway

Major junctions
- South end: MD 28 in Tuscarora
- MD 80 in Buckeystown; I-270 in Ballenger Creek; MD 355 in Ballenger Creek; I-70 / US 40 in Ballenger Creek
- North end: East Street in Frederick

Location
- Country: United States
- State: Maryland
- Counties: Frederick

Highway system
- Maryland highway system; Interstate; US; State; Scenic Byways
← MD 84	→ MD 86

Maryland Route 85 (MD 85) is a state highway in the U.S. state of Maryland. Known as Buckeystown Pike, the state highway runs 10.80 miles (17.38 km) from MD 28 in Tuscarora north to the Frederick city limit north of Interstate 70 (I-70), where the highway continues north as East Street. MD 85 connects Tuscarora and Buckeystown in southern Frederick County with the county seat of Frederick. The state highway also links the suburban area between Buckeystown and Frederick with I-70 and I-270. MD 85 is the old alignment of U.S. Route 15 (US 15), which was originally constructed between Tuscarora and Frederick in the late 1910s and early 1920s. MD 85 was assigned to the highway in 1970 when US 15 was moved to a new highway heading north from its Potomac River crossing at Point of Rocks. The state highway was extended north to the city of Frederick as part of a project to overhaul MD 355's interchange with I-70 in the first decade of the 21st century.

== Route description ==
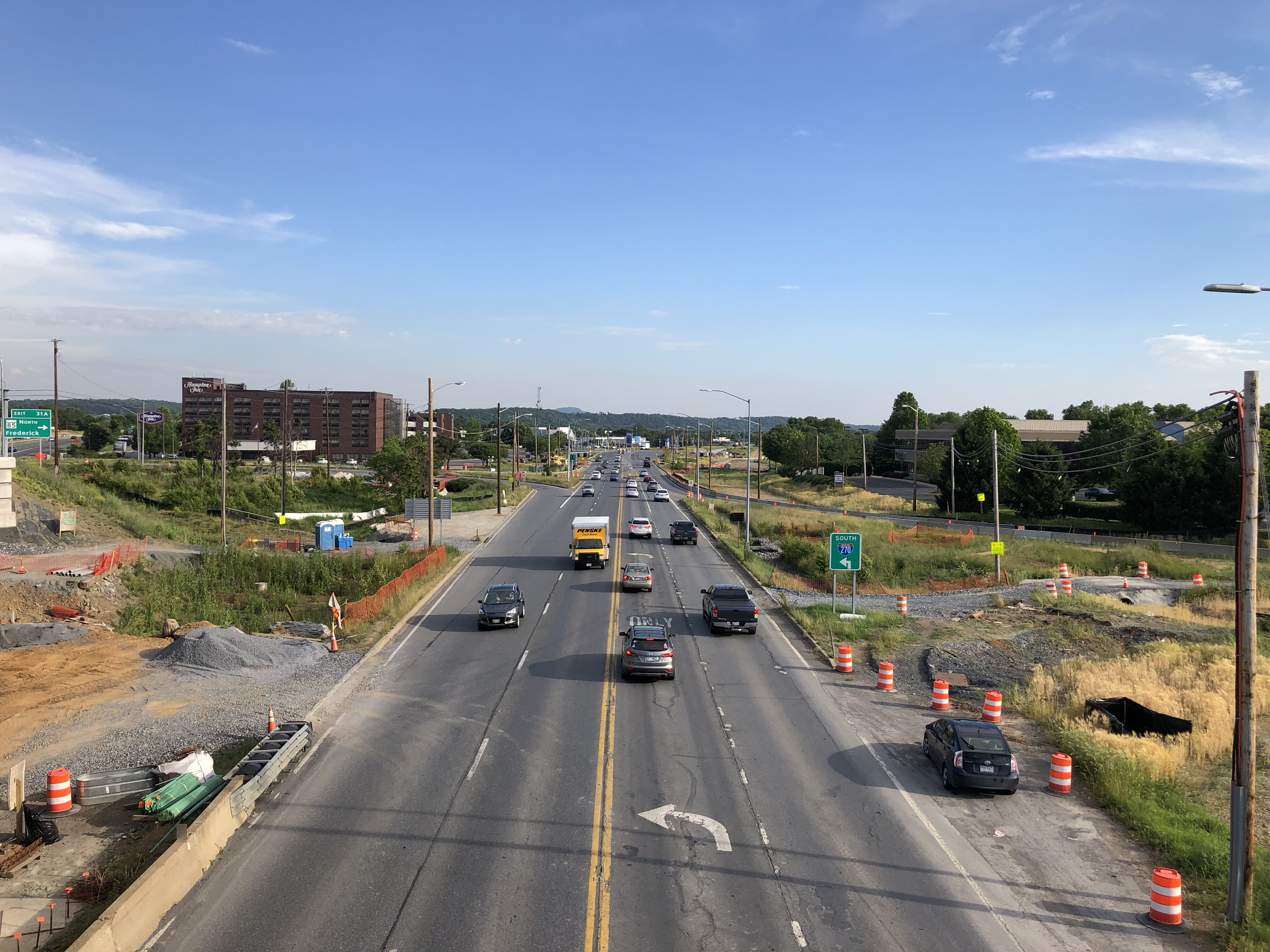
MD 85 southbound viewed from I-270 in Ballenger Creek

MD 85 begins at a three-way intersection with MD 28 in Tuscarora, which is also known as Licksville. The roadway continues south as eastbound MD 28 (Dickerson Road) and westbound MD 28 (Tuscarora Road) heads west from the intersection. MD 85 heads north through farmland as a two-lane undivided road that parallels the Monocacy River about 1 mile (1.6 km) to the east. The state highway intersects Lily Pons Road, which heads east toward the Lily Pons Water Gardens and the historic Amelung House and Glassworks, and Adamstown Road, which heads west toward Adamstown. MD 85 intersects the western terminus of MD 80 (Fingerboard Road) on the southern edge of Buckeystown. The state highway continues through the Buckeystown Historic District, where the highway intersects Manor Woods Road and the old alignment of MD 80, Michaels Mill Road, and crosses Rocky Fountain Run. The road runs through rural land and passes to the west of Saint John's Catholic Prep school.

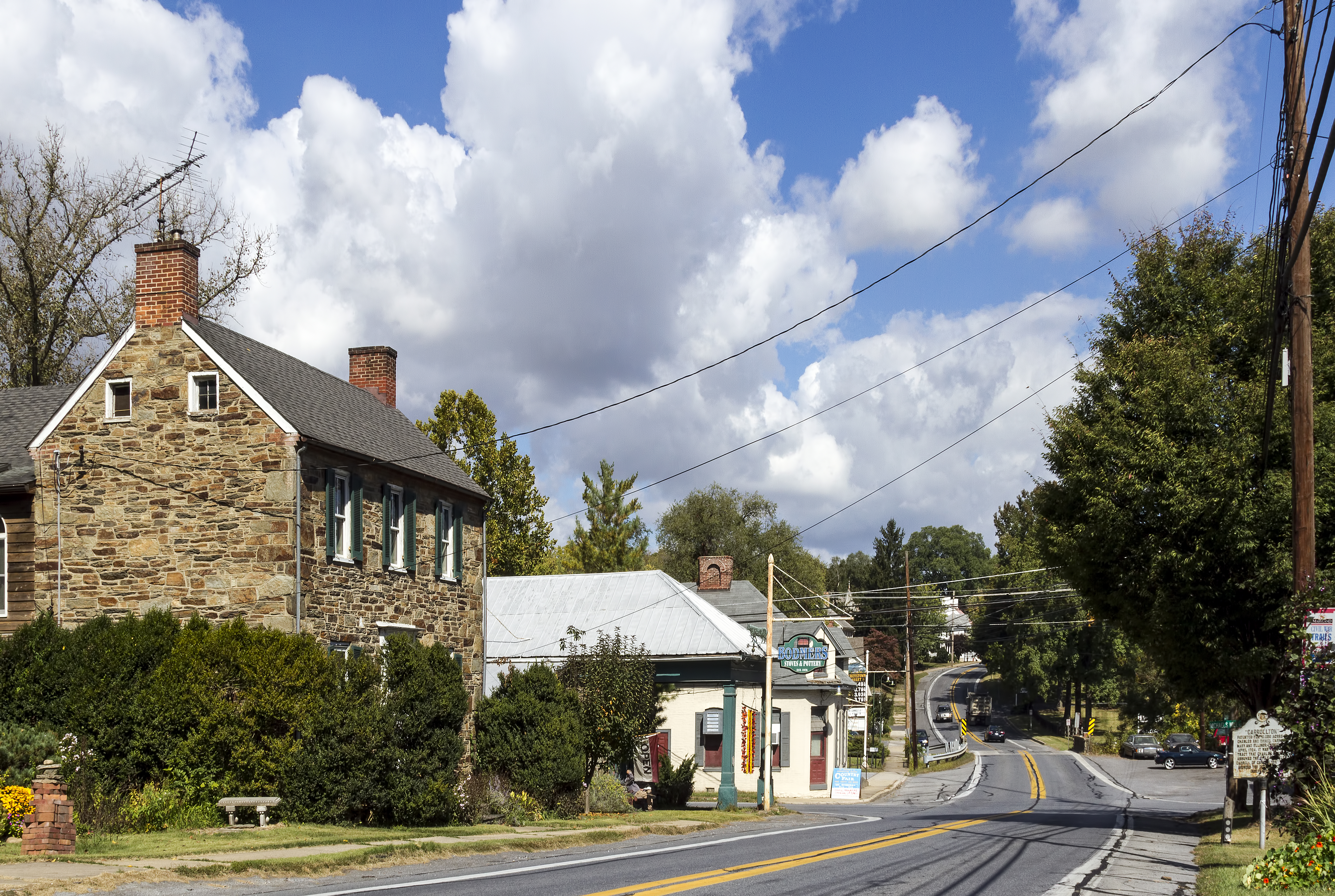
MD 85 northbound in Buckeystown

MD 85 enters an industrial area as the highway enters the community of Lime Kiln, the site of the road's oblique at-grade crossing of CSX's Old Main Line Subdivision railroad line. The state highway temporarily expands to a four-lane undivided highway between the railroad crossing and its intersection with English Muffin Way, which is the site of a Bimbo Bakeries USA factory. At the north end of the industrial area, MD 85 crosses Ballenger Creek and passes the George Markell Farmstead and the historic home Arcadia. The state highway expands to a four-lane undivided highway as it passes through a commercial area north of Executive Way. MD 85 intersects Crestwood Boulevard, which heads west into the suburb of Ballenger Creek, before the highway meets I-270 (Eisenhower Memorial Highway) at a partial cloverleaf interchange at a rakish angle.

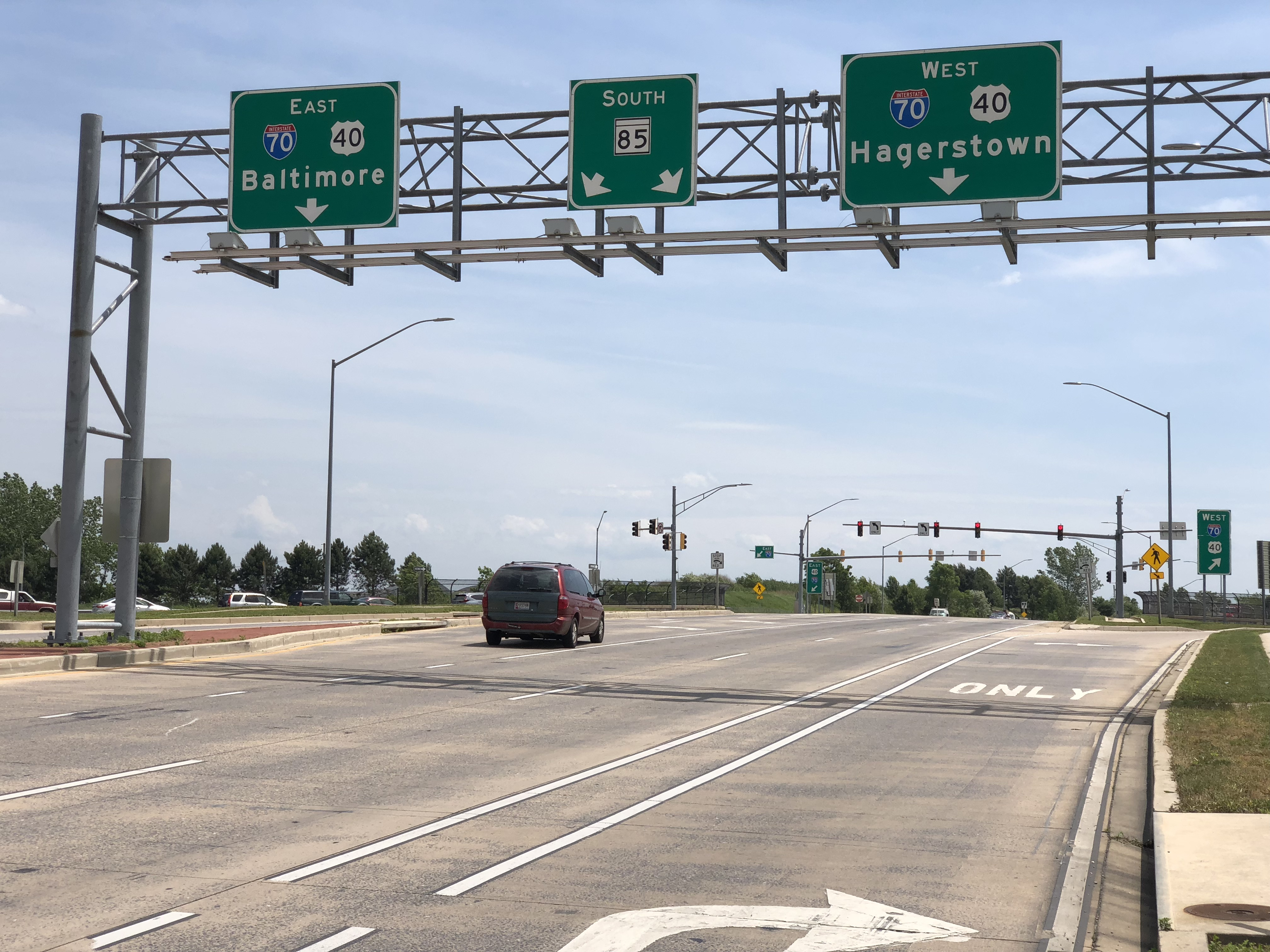
MD 85 southbound at I-70/US 40 in Frederick

MD 85 continues north through a commercial area that includes the Francis Scott Key Mall. At the northern end of the commercial area at Evergreen Point, the state highway expands to a divided highway, veers east, and intersects MD 355 (Urbana Pike). MD 85 curves to the north and meets I-70/US 40 (Baltimore National Pike) at a single-point urban interchange. The state highway intersects Walser Drive and Monocacy Boulevard before reaching its northern terminus at the end of state maintenance next to Harry T. Greager Memorial Athletic Field at the city limit of Frederick. The roadway continues north as East Street through the Frederick Historic District, where the street passes the Frederick station on the Frederick Branch of MARC's Brunswick Line.

MD 85 is a part of the National Highway System as a principal arterial from I-270 in Ballenger Creek north to I-70/US 40 just south of Frederick.

== History ==
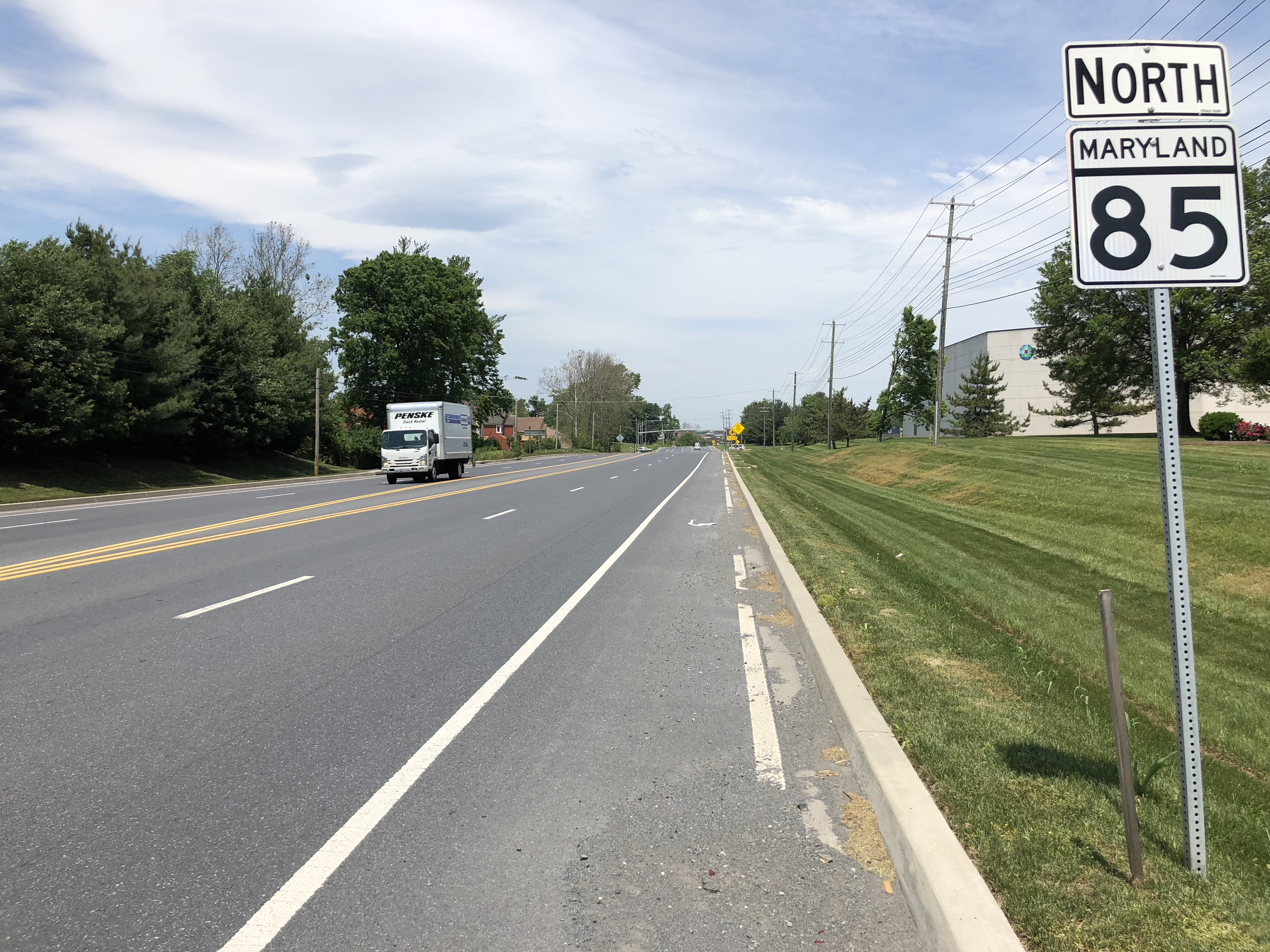
View north along MD 85 south of Frederick

MD 85 is the old alignment of US 15 from Tuscarora to Frederick. A portion of the highway was originally a turnpike called the Frederick and Buckeystown Turnpike from its junction with the Frederick and Monocacy Turnpike (which became US 240 and is now MD 355) at Evergreen Point to 1 mile (1.6 km) south of Buckeystown. The old turnpike was resurfaced in macadam by 1921. The remainder of modern Buckeystown Pike was paved as a 15-foot (4.6 m) wide concrete road from south of Buckeystown to around Lily Pons Road in 1918 and 1919 and south of Lily Pons Road to just north of the modern MD 28 junction by 1921. The concrete highway was extended south through the MD 28 junction to MD 28's junction with Nolands Ferry Road by 1923. Buckeystown Pike was designated US 15 in 1927. At that time, US 15 had yet to be constructed as a modern highway from Tuscarora to the bridge across the Potomac River at Point of Rocks. US 15 from Tuscarora to Point of Rocks was completed in 1933.

The first significant improvement to US 15 between Tuscarora and Frederick came in 1951 and 1952 when the U.S. highway was reconstructed and widened from Evergreen Point to Lime Kiln. In 1950, construction began on the Washington National Pike freeway, which would later become I-270. As part of that construction, a cloverleaf interchange was constructed between US 15 and the new freeway, which had its northern terminus at US 15 until US 40's segment of the Frederick Bypass opened in 1956. US 15 was moved to Washington National Pike north of Buckeystown Pike after the completion of the Frederick Freeway in 1959. The portion of Buckeystown Pike between the freeway and MD 355 was designated MD 806, which is used for several segments of the old alignment of US 15 north of Frederick. After US 15's present alignment north of Point of Rocks was completed in 1970, MD 85 was assigned to Buckeystown Pike south of I-270. MD 85 was extended north to MD 355 at Evergreen Point in 1971, replacing MD 806. The two loop ramps from MD 85 to I-270 were taken out of service to transform the interchange to its present partial cloverleaf by 1999; the loop ramps remain paved but blocked off.

The reconstruction of I-70 Exit 54 began in 2001 to replace the tight folded diamond interchange between the Interstate and MD 355 constructed in 1956 as part of the Frederick Freeway. The ramps between MD 355 and westbound I-70 were removed and temporarily replaced with ramps to and from Stadium Drive. In 2005, the intersection between MD 85 and MD 355 was transformed into a perpendicular intersection from the previous angled junction. MD 85 was extended north of MD 355 as a four-lane divided highway to a pair of ramps to and from eastbound I-70; the eastbound ramps at MD 355 were removed. Related to the project was an extension of East Street south from downtown Frederick to near I-70 that was temporarily designated MD 475. The overall project was completed in 2009 when a single-point urban interchange was completed between I-70 and MD 85. At the same time, MD 85 was extended north to its present terminus, the temporary ramps between Stadium Drive and westbound I-70 were removed, East Street was completed between MD 85 and downtown Frederick, and the unsigned MD 475 designation was removed from East Street.

The Maryland State Highway Administration plans to expand MD 85 to a four-lane divided highway from English Muffin Way north to MD 355 as part of a three-phase project. Phase 1, which includes the state highway from Crestwood Boulevard to just north of its interchange with I-270, involves the reconstruction of the interchange to a five-ramp configuration and replaced I-270's bridges over MD 85 (originally built in 1950), and was completed in November 2022. Phase 2 will extend the four-lane divided highway south from MD 355 to just north of I-270. Phase 3 from English Muffin Way to Crestwood Boulevard includes a new bridge over Ballenger Creek.

== Junction list ==
The entire route is in Frederick County.

Location	mi	km	Destinations	Notes
Tuscarora	0.00	0.00	MD 28 (Tuscarora Road/Dickerson Road) to US 15 – Point of Rocks, Dickerson	Southern terminus
Buckeystown	4.57	7.35	MD 80 east (Fingerboard Road) – Urbana	Western terminus of MD 80
Ballenger Creek	9.06	14.58	I-270 (Eisenhower Memorial Highway) to I-70 / US 15 – Washington	I-270 Exit 31
	10.18	16.38	MD 355 (Urbana Pike) – Urbana	
Frederick	10.57	17.01	I-70 / US 40 (Baltimore National Pike) – Baltimore, Hagerstown	I-70 Exit 54; single-point urban interchange
Frederick	10.80	17.38	East Street north	Frederick city limit; northern terminus
1.000 mi = 1.609 km; 1.000 km = 0.621 mi

== Auxiliary routes ==
- MD 85A is the designation for a 0.60-mile (0.97 km) section of Monocacy Boulevard in Frederick between the end of state maintenance west of MD 85 east across MD 85 to an intersection with South Street. The route was assigned in 2009 west of MD 85. MD 85A was extended east from MD 85 to South Street in 2012.
- MD 85B is the designation for the 0.21-mile (0.34 km) section of Francis Scott Key Drive running from MD 355 to MD 85 between the MD 85–MD 355 intersection and I-70. This road was built as part of the reconstruction at the northern end of MD 85 shortly before 2010; the route received its numerical designation in 2010.
