= Green Valley Road =

Green Valley Road may refer to:

- Green Valley Road (Maryland), also the unsigned Maryland Route 75
- Green Valley Road (California), part of California State Route 46
