= MD 80 =

MD 80 may refer to:

- McDonnell Douglas MD-80
- Maryland Route 80
