= Maryland Route 800 =

State highway in Maryland, United States

Maryland Route 800
- Watson Lane

Route information
- Maintained by MDSHA
- Length: 1.57 mi (2.53 km)
- Existed: 1963–present

Major junctions
- West end: MD 75 near Linwood
- East end: MD 75 near Linwood

Location
- Country: United States
- State: Maryland
- Counties: Carroll

Highway system
- Maryland highway system; Interstate; US; State; Scenic Byways
← MD 798	→ MD 802

Maryland Route 800 (MD 800) is a collection of state highways in the U.S. state of Maryland. The longest section of MD 800, officially MD 800D and known as Watson Lane, is signed and runs 1.57 miles (2.53 km) between two intersections with MD 75 near the unincorporated village of Linwood in western Carroll County. The multiple segments of MD 800 are sections of old alignment of MD 75 between Union Bridge and New Windsor. MD 75 was originally constructed through Linwood in the early 1920s. MD 800 sections were assigned after MD 75 was relocated through the area in the early 1960s.

== Route description ==
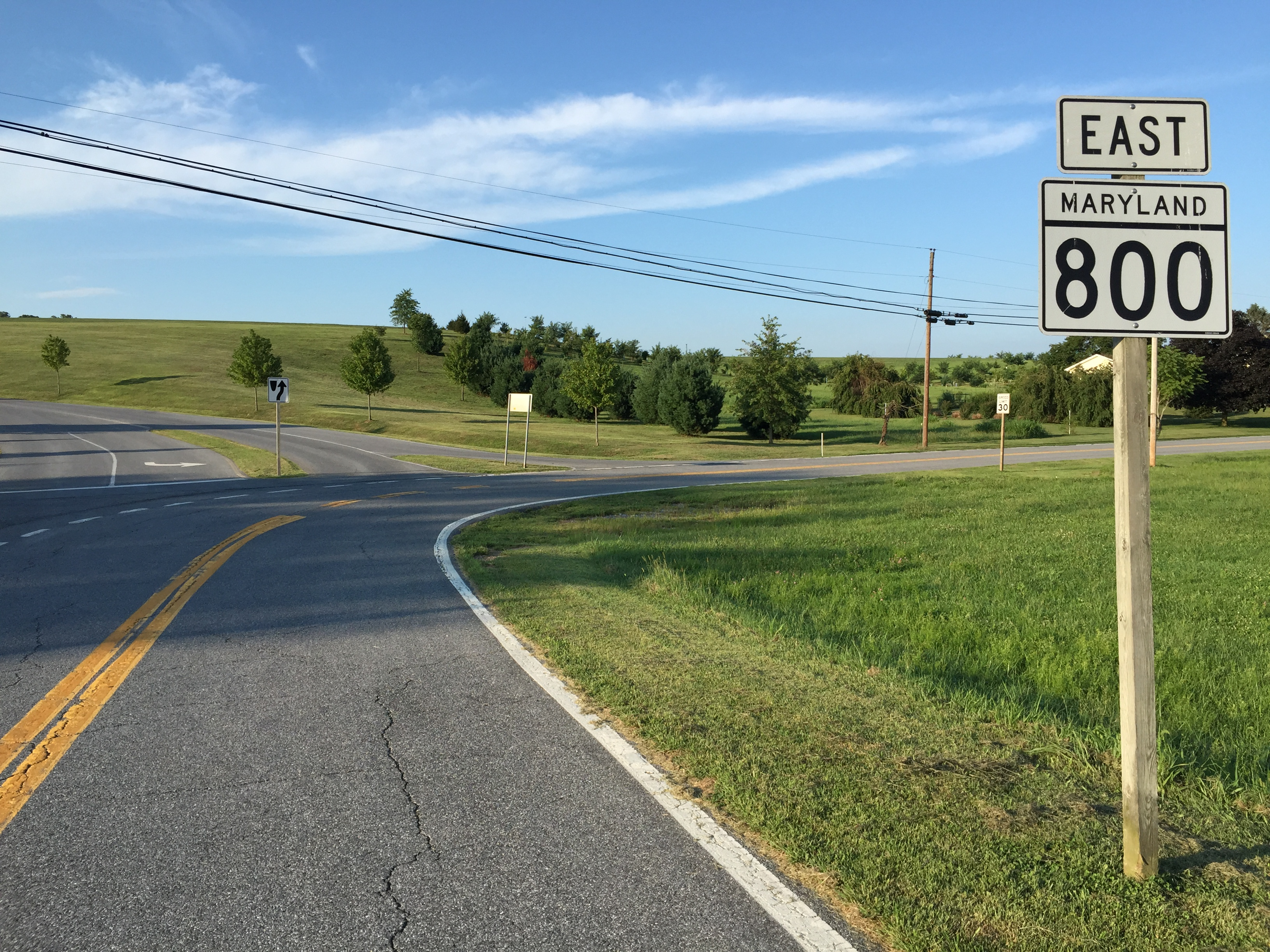
View east along MD 800D at MD 75 in Linwood

MD 800D begins at a perpendicular intersection with MD 75 (Green Valley Road) a short distance west of Linwood. The state highway heads north as a two-lane undivided road then turns east at a spur of old alignment that serves a farm. MD 800D crosses Wolf Pit Branch and closely parallels MD 75 until after the intersection with McKinstry Mill Road, which passes through the Linwood Historic District south of its intersection with MD 75. The state highway continues east, with farmland to the north and woods separating the highway from MD 75 until MD 800D reaches its eastern terminus at MD 75 opposite Winters Church Road.

== History ==
MD 800 consists of segments of MD 75 that were originally constructed as concrete roads between 1921 and 1923. The sections of roadway received their modern designations after MD 75 was relocated between Union Bridge and New Windsor around 1963. East of MD 800B, MD 84 was extended south to its present terminus over the old alignment of MD 75.

== Junction list ==
The entire route is in Linwood, Carroll County.

mi	km	Destinations	Notes
0.00	0.00	MD 75 (Green Valley Road) – Union Bridge	Western terminus
1.57	2.53	MD 75 (Green Valley Road) / Winters Church Road south – New Windsor	Eastern terminus
1.000 mi = 1.609 km; 1.000 km = 0.621 mi

== Auxiliary routes ==
There are five other existing sections of MD 800, all of which are unsigned. MD 800G is a connector between MD 75 and MD 800C; the other four highways and the extinct MD 800F are sections of old alignment of MD 75.

- MD 800A is the designation for Mill Dale Lane, a 0.05-mile (0.080 km) segment of old alignment located adjacent to MD 75's intersection with MD 84 (Clear Ridge Road) north of New Windsor.
- MD 800B is the designation for an unnamed 0.20-mile (0.32 km) piece of old alignment north of New Windsor that now serves as a connector between MD 75 and MD 84.
- MD 800C is the designation for an unnamed 0.07-mile (0.11 km) section of old alignment that parallels the southbound side of MD 75 in front of St. Luke's Lutheran Church just west of MD 800B.
- MD 800E is the designation for an unnamed 0.03-mile (0.048 km) section of old alignment that parallels the southbound side of MD 75 at Stem Road between Union Bridge and Linwood.
- MD 800F was the designation for an unnamed 0.04-mile (0.064 km) section of old alignment that paralleled the southbound side of MD 75 between Stem Road and Philips Lane near Union Bridge. MD 800F, which was connected to MD 75 by MD 75A, was removed from the state highway system in 2004.
- MD 800G is a 0.01-mile (0.016 km) connector between MD 75 and MD 800C. MD 800G was assigned to what had previously been an undesignated spur in 2009.
