= Maryland Route 80 =

State highway in Maryland, US

Maryland Route 80
- Maryland Route 80 highlighted in red

Route information
- Maintained by MDSHA
- Length: 14.79 mi (23.80 km)
- Existed: 1927–present
- Tourist routes: Antietam Campaign Scenic Byway

Major junctions
- West end: MD 85 in Buckeystown
- I-270 in Urbana; MD 355 in Urbana; MD 75 near Green Valley
- East end: MD 27 near Damascus

Location
- Country: United States
- State: Maryland
- Counties: Frederick, Montgomery

Highway system
- Maryland highway system; Interstate; US; State; Scenic Byways
← MD 79	→ I-81

Maryland Route 80 (MD 80) is a state highway in the U.S. state of Maryland. Known for most of its length as Fingerboard Road, the highway runs 14.79 miles (23.80 km) from MD 85 in Buckeystown east to MD 27 near Damascus. MD 80 connects Buckeystown and Urbana in southern Frederick County with Damascus in far northern Montgomery County. At the suburban community of Urbana, the route has junctions with Interstate 270 (I-270) and MD 355. MD 80 was constructed between MD 27 and MD 75 in the mid- to late 1920s. The highway was built from Urbana to MD 75 in the mid-1930s and from Buckeystown to Urbana in the late 1930s. MD 80 was relocated at its western end in the mid-1970s and relocated and expanded through Urbana in the 2000s.

== Route description ==
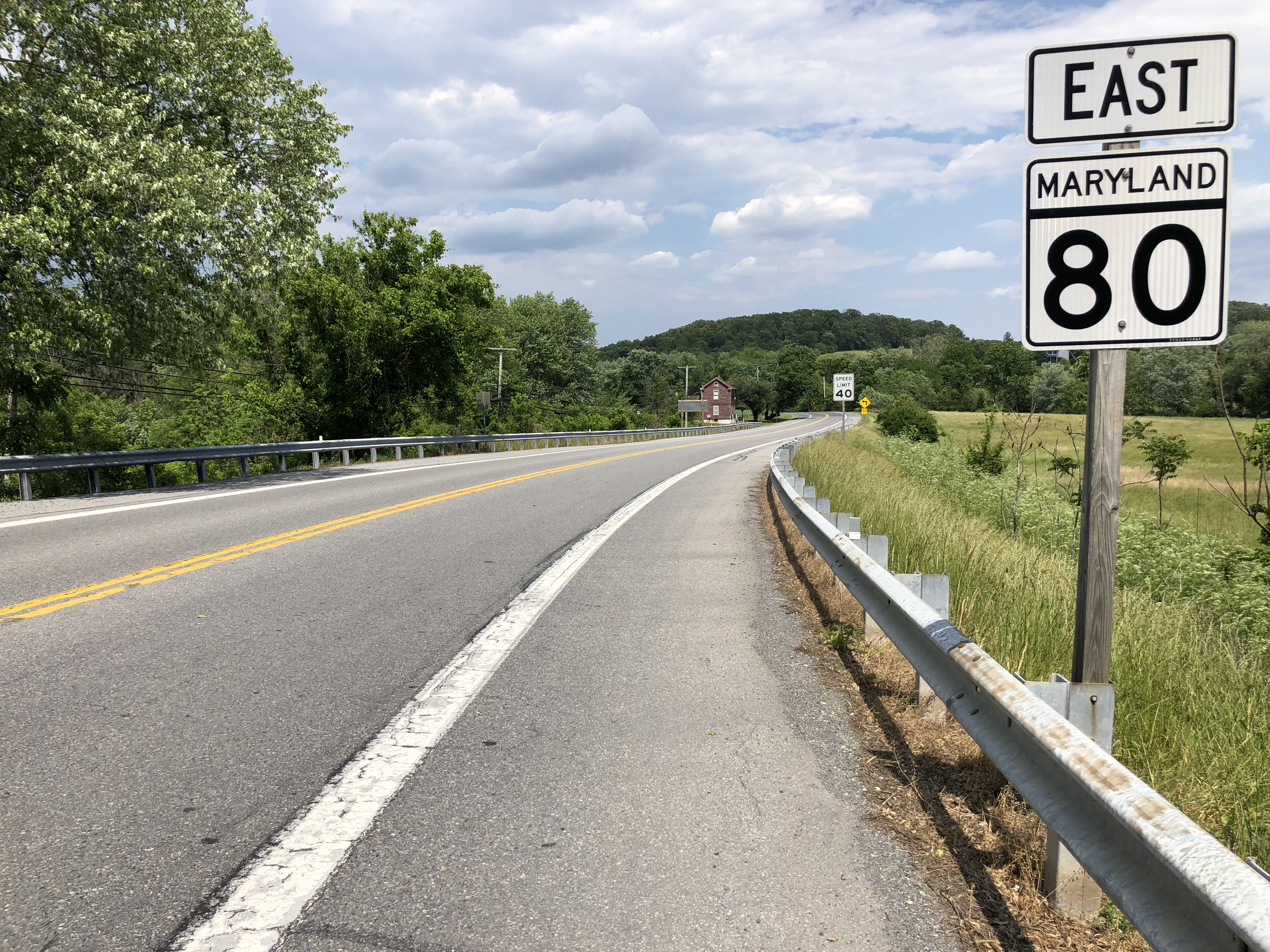
View east along MD 80 at the Monocacy River near Hope Hill

MD 80 begins at an intersection with MD 85 (Buckeystown Pike) south of the Buckeystown Historic District. The highway heads east as two-lane undivided Fingerboard Road, which meets the eastern end of Michaels Mill Road immediately before crossing the Monocacy River. As MD 80 approaches I-270 (Eisenhower Memorial Highway), the highway veers southeast to parallel the Interstate. The route expands to a four-lane divided highway as it curves east and meets the freeway at a four-ramp partial cloverleaf interchange; the southbound I-270 ramps meet MD 80 at a roundabout. Following this interchange, the road passes between two park and ride lots serving MTA Maryland commuter buses. MD 80 has another roundabout with Sugarloaf Parkway before meeting Urbana Pike east of the center of Urbana. The highway intersects MD 355 (Worthington Boulevard), the main east–west street through the suburban development in Urbana, before becoming undivided while passing north of Urbana High School and dropping to two lanes again on either side of Carriage Hill Drive. East of Urbana, MD 80 meets the southern end of Ijamsville Road south of Ijamsville and has staggered intersections with MD 75 (Green Valley Road) south of Monrovia, with which it forms a short concurrency with, while passing through the expansive area known as Green Valley. Shortly after passing through the hamlet of Kemptown, the highway enters Montgomery County. MD 80 continues as Kemptown Road a short distance southeast to its terminus at MD 27 (Ridge Road) in the hamlet of Claggettsville north of Damascus.

== History ==
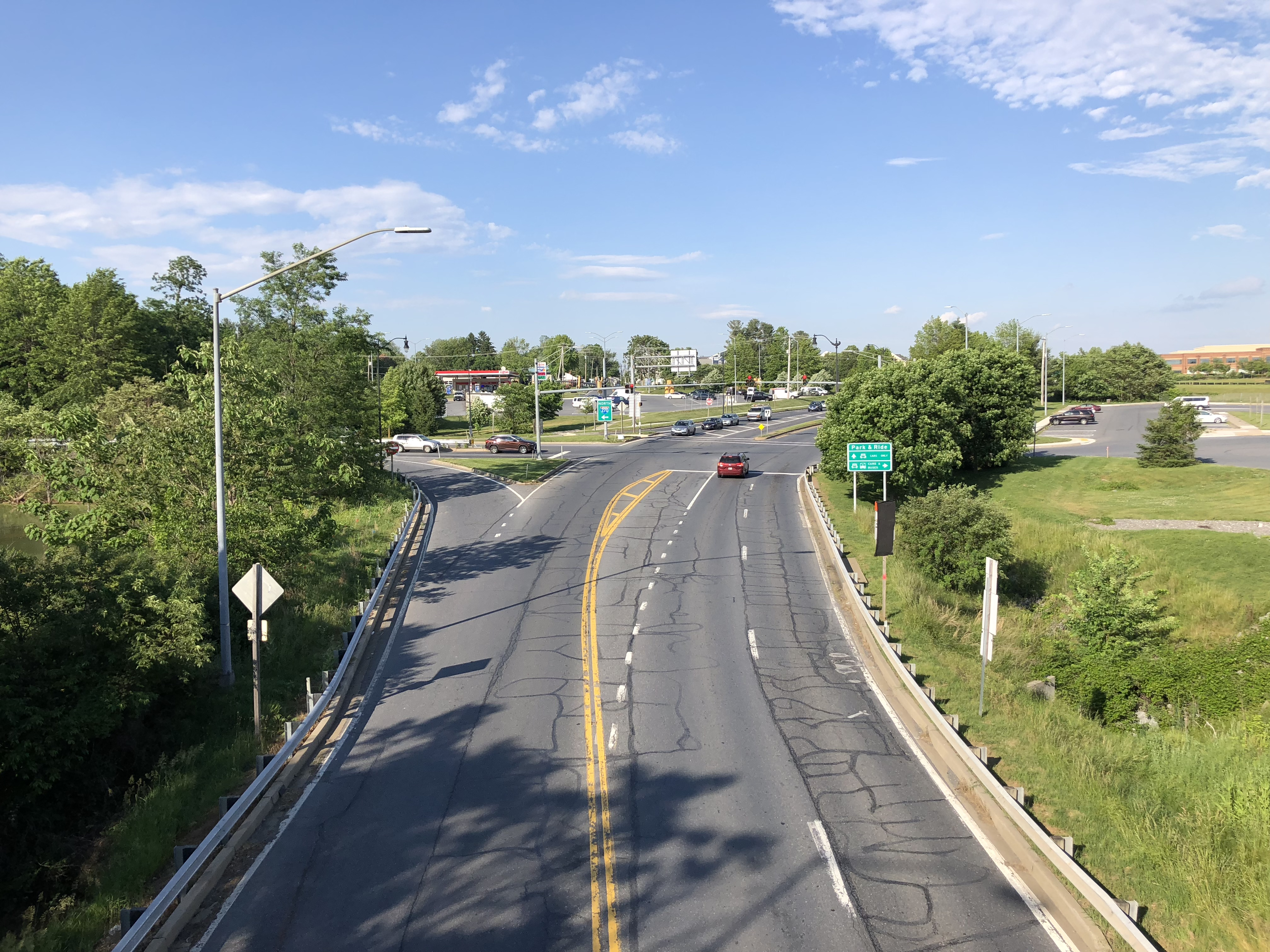
View east along MD 80 from I-270 in Urbana

Fingerboard Road is likely named for a finger-shaped sign pointing toward a cannery in Monrovia, a sign that would have been at the highway's western intersection with MD 75. The MD 75 concurrency next to the fingerboard was the first segment of Fingerboard Road paved around 1921. MD 80's old concurrency with U.S. Route 240 (US 240, later MD 355) was paved as a concrete road in 1923. US 240 through Urbana was widened to 20 feet (6.1 m) by 1930 and resurfaced with bituminous concrete in 1938. The first segment of MD 80 proper built was from MD 27 at Claggettsville west to Penn Shop Road, which was paved as a concrete road in 1925 and 1926. Another stretch of concrete was built from MD 75 east to Lynn Burke Road in 1926 and 1927. The western segment was extended part of the way to Bartholows Road in 1928. The Fingerboard–Claggettsville highway was completed when the gap through Kemptown was completed in 1929 and 1930.

Fingerboard Road from Urbana to Centerville just east of modern Carriage Hill Drive was built as a treated earth road between 1933 and 1935. This semi-modern road was completed east to MD 75 in 1936. The final section of MD 80 from Buckeystown to Urbana was constructed as a concrete road around 1938. The Urbana–Fingerboard highway was widened and resurfaced between 1950 and 1952. MD 80's interchange with the new Washington National Pike (now I-270) was also constructed in that time span. Shortly thereafter, MD 80 was widened between US 240 and the new freeway. The old highway with which MD 80 passed through the center of Urbana became US 240 Alternate in 1954 and MD 355 in 1955.

MD 80's present alignment west of the Monocacy River was constructed between 1973 and 1975. The old road, now named Michaels Mill Road, was redesignated MD 880 and remained in the state highway system until 2008. Reconstruction of MD 80 through Urbana began shortly before 2000; that year, relocation of MD 80 as a four-lane divided highway from I-270 to MD 355 was completed, including the roundabout at Sugarloaf Parkway. The highway was expanded to four lanes through the I-270 interchange and the roundabout with the southbound I-270 ramps were built in 2008. The upgrades to MD 80 were completed in 2009 when the highway was expanded to a four-lane divided highway from MD 355 to Carriage Hill Drive.

== Junction list ==
County	Location	mi	km	Destinations	Notes
Frederick	Buckeystown	0.00	0.00	MD 85 (Buckeystown Pike) – Frederick, Point of Rocks	Western terminus
Frederick	Urbana	4.98	8.01	I-270 (Eisenhower Memorial Highway) – Frederick, Washington	I-270 Exit 26
Frederick	Urbana	5.72	9.21	MD 355 (Worthington Boulevard) – Hyattstown, Frederick	
Frederick	Green Valley	10.16	16.35	MD 75 north (Green Valley Road) – New Market	West end of MD 75 concurrency
Frederick	Green Valley	10.29	16.56	MD 75 south (Green Valley Road) – Hyattstown	East end of MD 75 concurrency
Montgomery	Damascus	14.79	23.80	MD 27 (Ridge Road) – Germantown, Mount Airy	Eastern terminus
1.000 mi = 1.609 km; 1.000 km = 0.621 mi: Concurrency terminus

== Auxiliary routes ==
MD 80 had a trio of auxiliary routes that were created in 2000 when MD 80 was relocated in Urbana. All three routes were transferred to county maintenance in 2005.

- MD 80A was the designation for Old MD 80, which ran 0.19 miles (0.31 km) from a dead end adjacent to the I-270 interchange east to an acute intersection with MD 355.
- MD 80B was the designation for Service Road, a 0.05-mile (0.080 km) connector between MD 80 and MD 80A.
- MD 80C was the designation for the 0.05-mile (0.080 km) segment of Sugarloaf Parkway between MD 80 and MD 355.
