= George Markell Farmstead =

Historic farm in Maryland, US

- U.S. National Register of Historic Places
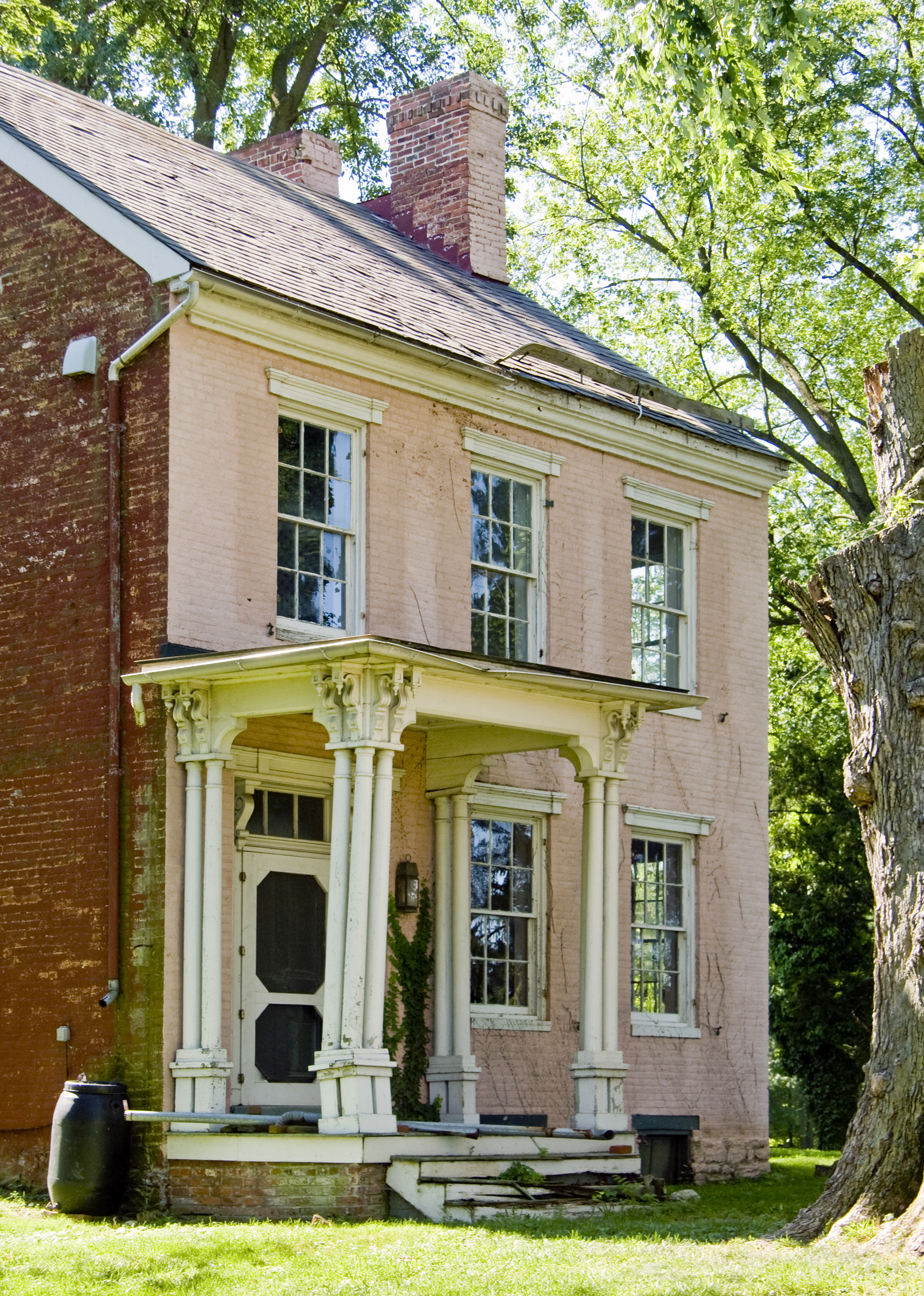

- Location within Maryland Location within the United States
- Location: 4825 Buckeystown Pike (MD 85), Frederick, Maryland
- Coordinates: 39°21′58″N 77°24′54″W
- Area: 5.5 acres (2.2 ha)
- Built: 1864
- Architectural style: Greek Revival
- NRHP reference No.: 02001584
- Added to NRHP: December 27, 2002

The George Markell Farmstead, also known as Arcadian Dairy Farm and the Thomas Property, is a historic home and farm complex located at Frederick, Frederick County, Maryland, United States. It consists of brick house built about 1865, a brick smokehouse, a bake oven, two stone domestic outbuildings, an ice house, a springhouse, a frame stable, a frame chicken house, a mid-20th century guest house, and various sheds and outbuildings. Nearby is a large gambrel-roofed concrete block barn. The main house has combined Greek Revival and Italianate stylistic influences. The once large Markell dairy farm, with its lane to the Ballenger Creek ford of the Monocacy River, served as the primary approach route to the battlefield by Confederate troops during the July 9, 1864 Battle of Monocacy during the American Civil War.

The George Markell Farmstead was listed on the National Register of Historic Places in 2002.
