= Mount Pleasant (Union Bridge, Maryland) =

Historic house in Maryland, United States

- Mt. Pleasant
- U.S. National Register of Historic Places
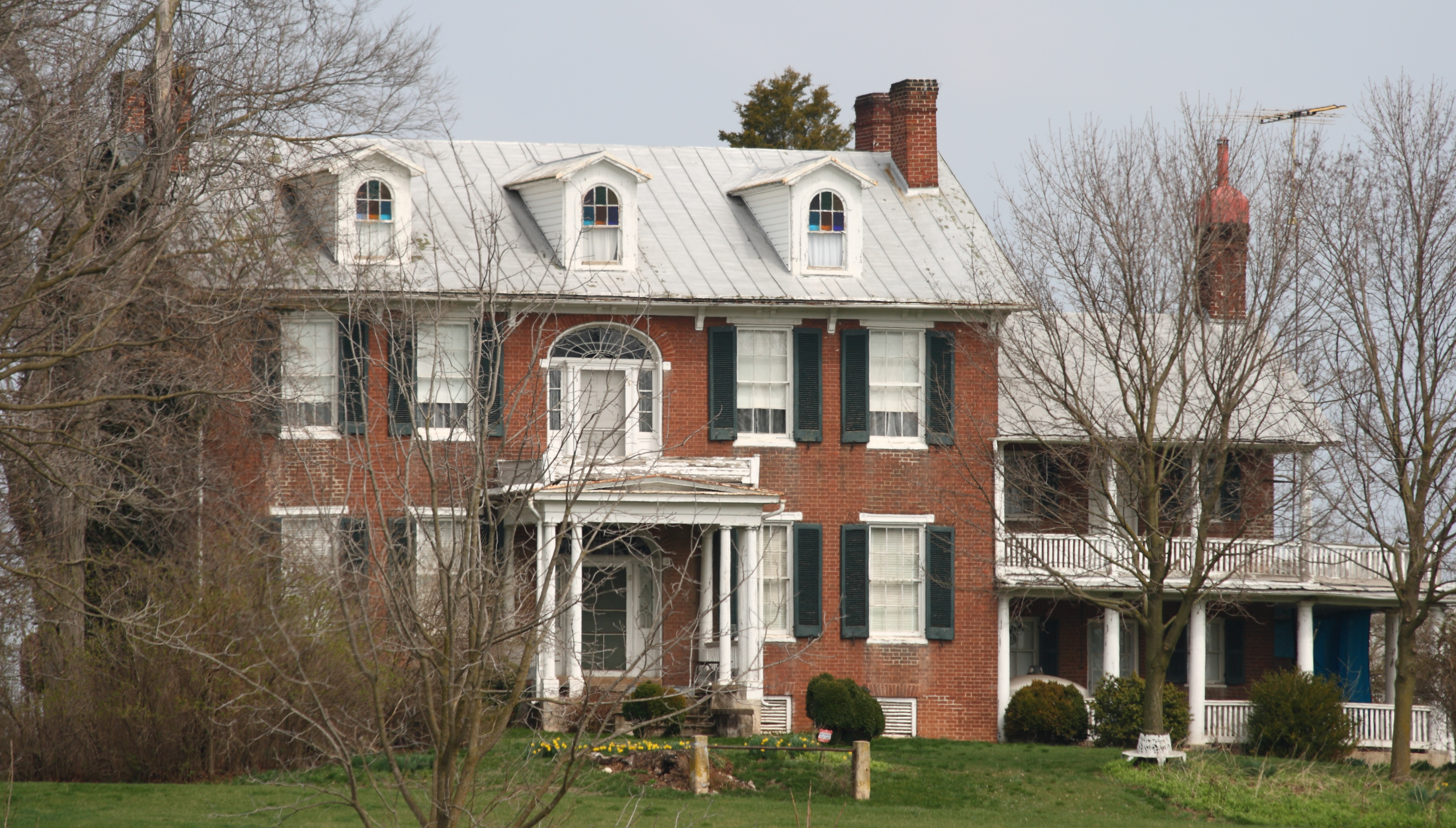

- Location within Maryland Location within the United States
- Location: 200 W. Locust Street (Bucher John Road), Union Bridge, Maryland
- Coordinates: 39°34′16.4″N 77°11′6.3″W
- Area: 207.9 acres (84.1 ha)
- Built: 1815
- Architectural style: Federal
- NRHP reference No.: 98001260
- Added to NRHP: November 4, 1998

Mt. Pleasant, also known as the Clemson Family Farm, is a historic home located at Union Bridge, Carroll County, Maryland, United States. It is a five-bay by two-bay, 2 1/2-story brick structure with a gable roof and built about 1815. Also on the property is a brick wash house, a hewn mortised-and-tenoned-and-pegged timber-braced frame wagon shed flanked by corn cribs, and various other sheds and outbuildings. It was the home farm of the Farquhar family, prominent Quakers of Scotch-Irish descent who were primarily responsible for the establishment of the Pipe Creek Settlement.

Mt. Pleasant was listed on the National Register of Historic Places in 1998.
