= Pipe Creek Friends Meetinghouse =

Historic church in Maryland, United States

- U.S. National Register of Historic Places
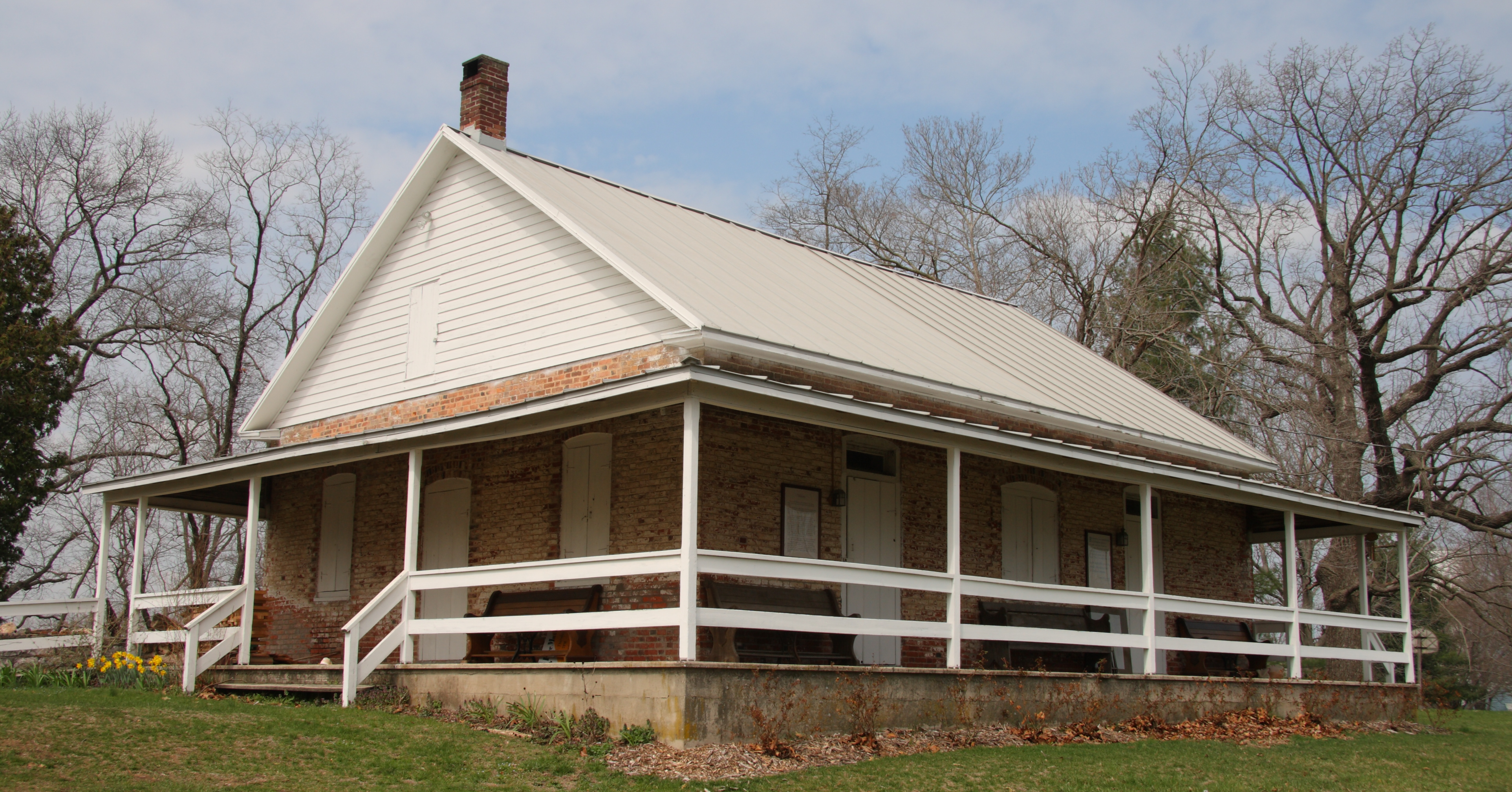

- Location within Maryland Location within the United States
- Location: 455 Quaker Hill Rd., Union Bridge, Maryland
- Coordinates: 39°33′49″N 77°10′12″W
- Area: 2 acres (0.81 ha)
- Built: 1771
- NRHP reference No.: 76000983
- Added to NRHP: November 7, 1976

Pipe Creek Friends Meetinghouse is an historic Friends meeting house located at Union Bridge, Carroll County, Maryland, United States. It is a 1 1/2 - story brick structure in Flemish bond on a stone foundation. The meetinghouse was begun in 1771 and completed the next year. A fire in October 1934 destroyed the interior, but the original benches were saved. The founders of the meetinghouse were immigrants from the north of Ireland. It was the Quaker meetinghouse attended by a great-grandfather of President Herbert Hoover.

The Pipe Creek Friends Meetinghouse was listed on the National Register of Historic Places in 1976.
