= Wilson's Inheritance =

Historic house in Maryland, United States

- U.S. National Register of Historic Places
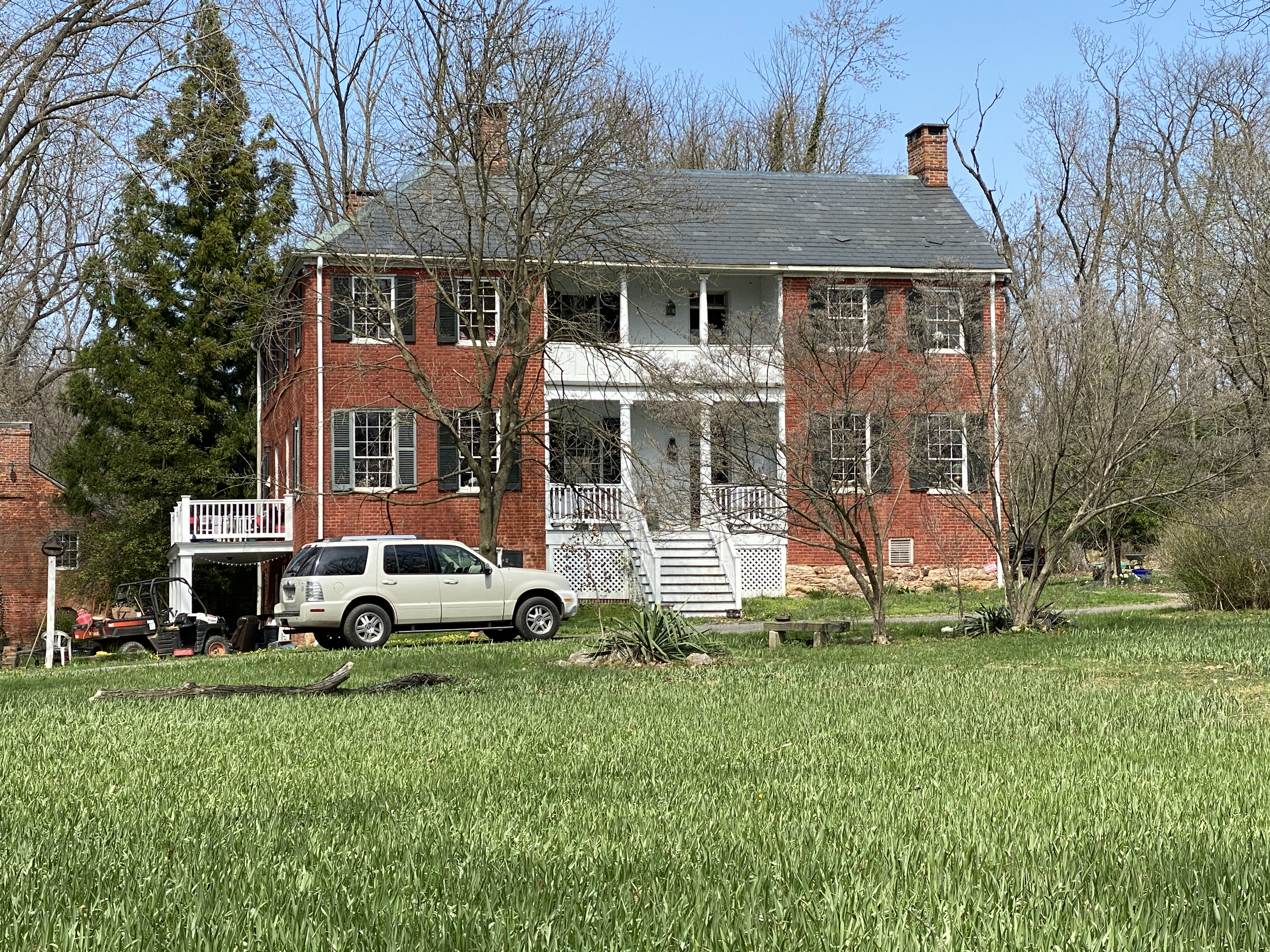

- Location within Maryland Location within the United States
- Location: 4400 Green Valley Road (MD 75), Union Bridge, Maryland
- Coordinates: 39°34′15.8″N 77°9′31.9″W
- Area: 21 acres (8.5 ha)
- Built: 1837
- Built by: Shueey, Lewis
- NRHP reference No.: 85001270
- Added to NRHP: June 19, 1985

Wilson's Inheritance is a historic home and farm complex located at Union Bridge, Carroll County, Maryland, United States. The complex includes the 1832-38 farmhouse, a bank barn, blacksmith shop, washhouse, smokehouse, chicken houses, sheds, and a privy. The brick house features an L-shaped plan, stone foundation, gable roof, ornamentation, and its siting into a slope.

Wilson's Inheritance was listed on the National Register of Historic Places in 1985.
