= Hard Lodging =

Historic house in Maryland, United States

- U.S. National Register of Historic Places
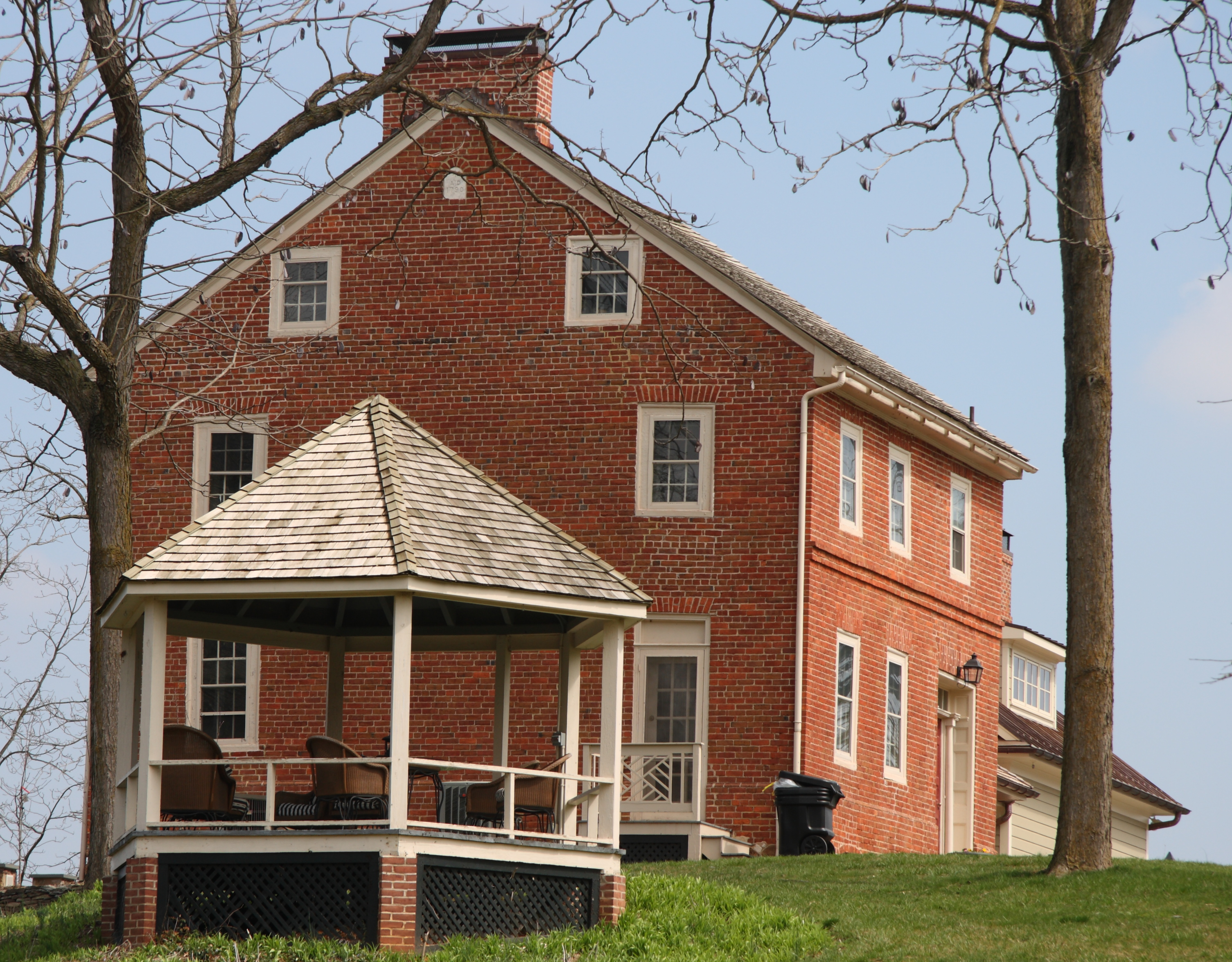

- Location within Maryland Location within the United States
- Location: 4623 Ladiesburg Road, Union Bridge, Maryland
- Coordinates: 39°33′55.6″N 77°9′56″W
- Area: 20 acres (8.1 ha)
- Built: 1790; 236 years ago
- Built by: Shepard, Solomon
- Architectural style: Federal
- NRHP reference No.: 78001451
- Added to NRHP: June 9, 1978

Hard Lodging is a historic home located at Union Bridge, Carroll County, Maryland, United States. It is built on a small cliff overlooking the site where its first owner, Solomon Shepherd, had a mill that is no longer standing. The house was built in three stages: the middle section, a 2 1/2-story brick structure, was probably built first; the main section of the house is attached to the west and is a Federal-style, three-by-two-bay, 2 1/2-story house with an interior gable-end chimney. Hard Lodging is currently a private residence and is no longer owned by the Historical Society. The home is an example of Pennsylvania German architecture.

Hard Lodging was listed on the National Register of Historic Places in 1978.
