= Union Bridge station =

- Union Bridge Station
- U.S. National Register of Historic Places
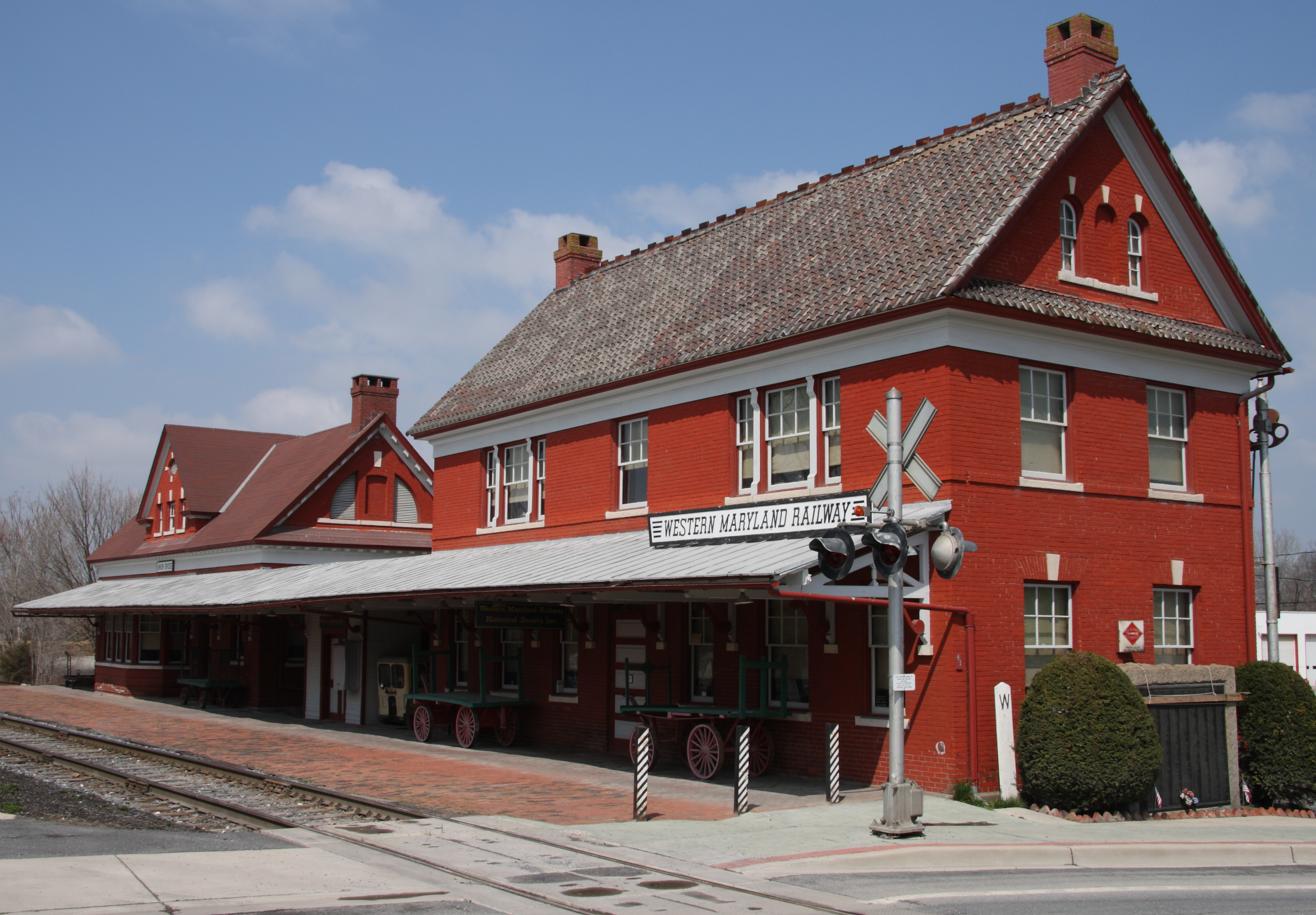
- Union Bridge Station

- Location within Maryland Location within the United States
- Location: 41 N. Main Street (MD 35), Union Bridge, Maryland
- Coordinates: 39°34′14″N 77°10′39″W
- Area: 2 acres (0.81 ha)
- Built: 1902
- Architectural style: Greek Revival
- NRHP reference No.: 76000984
- Added to NRHP: November 7, 1976

Union Bridge station is a historic railway station in Union Bridge, Carroll County, Maryland. It was built in 1902 as a stop for the Western Maryland Railway. It is representative of the rural railway stations constructed during the late 19th and early 20th centuries. The station's two buildings are arranged with their south façades lengthwise fronting the railroad tracks.

The railroad operated a major railroad car shop adjacent to the station from the late 19th century until the 1950s. The shop buildings were demolished in 1964.

The station was listed on the National Register of Historic Places in 1976 as Union Bridge Station.

== Western Maryland Railway Historical Society Museum ==
The station is now the home of the Western Maryland Railway Historical Society Museum, which includes artifacts of the Western Maryland Railway.

== See also ==
- Union Bridge Historic District

Preceding station	Western Maryland Railway	Following station
Keymar toward Cumberland	Main Line	Linwood toward Baltimore Hillen
