= Green Valley, Maryland =

Census-designated place in Frederick County, Maryland, United States

- Census-designated place
- Location of Green Valley, Maryland
- Coordinates: 39°20′30″N 77°15′02″W
- Country: United States
- State: Maryland
- County: Frederick

Area
  - Total: 17.13 sq mi (44.37 km^{2})
  - Land: 17.10 sq mi (44.28 km^{2})
  - Water: 0.035 sq mi (0.09 km^{2})
- Elevation: 653 ft (199 m)

Population (2020)
  - Total: 12,643
  - Density: 739.5/sq mi (285.54/km^{2})
- Time zone: UTC−5 (Eastern (EST))
  - Summer (DST): UTC−4 (EDT)
- FIPS code: 24-35412
- GNIS feature ID: 2806298

Green Valley is an unincorporated area and census-designated place (CDP) in southern Frederick County, Maryland, United States. The population was 12,643 at the 2020 census. The area was listed as a census-designated place in 2000 but not listed as part of any CDP at the 2010 census. It was re-designated a census-designated place for the 2020 census.

== Geography ==
The Green Valley area is located in southeastern Frederick County at 39°20′30″N 77°14′26″W (39.341801, −77.240437), bordered to the south and east by Montgomery County. The northern edge of the CDP extends from Mount Airy in the northeast to New Market in the northwest. The unincorporated community of Monrovia is located just to the west.

According to the United States Census Bureau, the Green Valley CDP had a total area of 20.6 square miles (53 km^{2}), all land.

== Demographics ==
Historical population
Census	Pop.	Note	%±
1980	4,504		—
1990	9,424		109.2%
2000	12,262		30.1%
2020	12,643		—
U.S. Decennial Census; 2010 2020

Green Valley was first listed as a census designated place in the 1980 United States census. It was deleted prior to the 2010 U.S. census with portions used to form the Monrovia CDP; and was relisted as a census designated place in the 2020 U.S. census.

=== Racial and ethnic composition ===
Green Valley CDP, Maryland – Racial and ethnic composition Note: the US Census treats Hispanic/Latino as an ethnic category. This table excludes Latinos from the racial categories and assigns them to a separate category. Hispanics/Latinos may be of any race.
Race / Ethnicity (NH = Non-Hispanic)	Pop 2000	Pop 2010	Pop 2020	% 2000	% 2010	% 2020
White alone (NH)	11,613	x	10,463	94.71%	x	82.54%
Black or African American alone (NH)	151	x	297	1.23%	x	2.35%
Native American or Alaska Native alone (NH)	26	x	18	0.21%	x	0.14%
Asian alone (NH)	116	x	384	0.95%	x	3.04%
Native Hawaiian or Pacific Islander alone (NH)	5	x	1	0.04%	x	0.01%
Other race alone (NH)	13	x	58	0.11%	x	0.46%
Mixed race or Multiracial (NH)	131	x	599	1.07%	x	4.74%
Hispanic or Latino (any race)	207	x	850	1.69%	x	6.72%
Total	12,262	x	12,643	100.00%	x	100.00%

=== 2020 census ===
As of the 2020 census, Green Valley had a population of 12,643. The median age was 43.8 years. 22.2% of residents were under the age of 18 and 16.7% of residents were 65 years of age or older. For every 100 females there were 103.1 males, and for every 100 females age 18 and over there were 101.2 males age 18 and over.

56.3% of residents lived in urban areas, while 43.7% lived in rural areas.

There were 4,268 households in Green Valley, of which 35.6% had children under the age of 18 living in them. Of all households, 74.1% were married-couple households, 10.2% were households with a male householder and no spouse or partner present, and 12.1% were households with a female householder and no spouse or partner present. About 12.2% of all households were made up of individuals and 5.9% had someone living alone who was 65 years of age or older.

There were 4,342 housing units, of which 1.7% were vacant. The homeowner vacancy rate was 0.7% and the rental vacancy rate was 0.8%.

=== 2000 census ===
As of the 2000 census there were 12,262 people, 3,882 households, and 3,470 families residing in the CDP. The population density was 595.1 inhabitants per square mile (229.8/km^{2}). There were 3,928 housing units at an average density of 190.6 per square mile (73.6/km^{2}). The racial makeup of the CDP was 95.91% White, 1.24% African American, 0.23% Native American, 0.99% Asian, 0.04% Pacific Islander, 0.38% from other races, and 1.22% from two or more races. Hispanic or Latino of any race were 1.69% of the population.

There were 3,882 households, out of which 49.1% had children under the age of 18 living with them, 81.7% were married couples living together, 4.6% had a female householder with no husband present, and 10.6% were non-families. 7.8% of all households were made up of individuals, and 2.8% had someone living alone who was 65 years of age or older. The average household size was 3.16 and the average family size was 3.33.

In the CDP, the population was spread out, with 31.2% under the age of 18, 5.6% from 18 to 24, 30.0% from 25 to 44, 27.5% from 45 to 64, and 5.7% who were 65 years of age or older. The median age was 37 years. For every 100 females, there were 102.6 males. For every 100 females age 18 and over, there were 100.6 males.

The median income for a household in the CDP was $81,732, and the median income for a family was $84,607. Males had a median income of $53,482 versus $37,726 for females. The per capita income for the CDP was $29,408. About 1.9% of families and 2.1% of the population were below the poverty line, including 1.4% of those under age 18 and 0.4% of those age 65 or over.

== Education ==
Green Valley is part of the Frederick County public school system.

School zoning is as follows: Aras are divided between Green Valley Elementary School, Kemptown, and Twin Ridge elementary schools. Most areas are zoned to Windsor Knolls Middle School, while some are zoned to New Market Midde School. Some areas are zoned to Linganore High School and others are zoned to Urbana High School.
