= Linganore High School =

Location
- 12013 Old Annapolis Road; Frederick, Maryland 21701; United States; 39°25′58″N 77°14′49″W

Information
- Type: Public
- Established: 1962
- School district: Frederick County Public Schools
- Principal: Michael Dillman
- Grades: 9-12
- Enrollment: 1,393 (2020–21)
- Colors: Red and black
- Slogan: Working Together, Providing Opportunities for Excellence
- Nickname: Lancers
- Feeder schools: New Market Middle School & Windsor Knolls Middle School
- Website: education.fcps.org/lhs

Linganore High School is an American high school in Frederick County, Maryland. It serves the eastern portion of Frederick County. The school's mascot is the Lancer and its colors are red and black.

The school's attendance boundary includes the following: Monrovia, New Market, a portion of Green Valley, and the Frederick County portion of Mount Airy.

== History ==
Linganore High School Junior-Senior High School opened in 1962 and was built to serve the eastern section of Frederick County, including New Market, Libertytown, Mount Pleasant, Kemptown, Johnsville, Monrovia and Bartonsville. The first class graduated in 1963. For nearly 20 years, Linganore served students in grades 7–12. Eventually, middle schools were opened to serve students in grades 6–8 and Linganore then became Linganore High School, educating students in grades 9–12. In its lifetime, the original school building had three additions, first in 1972 and again in 1983 and 1985.

The original building closed in June 2008 and was demolished for a new Linganore High School to be built on the site. During the two years the replacement building was being constructed, Linganore High School operated as the first school in the building that is now Oakdale High School. The project cost approximately $73 million, including demolition of the original building and furnishing of the new building. The architect for the new Linganore was Grimm + Parker. Oak Construction was the builder.

The new Linganore High School was dedicated on August 12, 2010, and opened for the first day of the 2010–2011 school year on August 23, 2010. The new Linganore building was built for 1,600 students, which triggered a redistricting of students in Frederick County.

The new building included updated construction features not present in the original building. Light and motion sensors are used to control lights throughout the building. Permeable paving on some exterior walkways reduces rainfall runoff. A magnetic chiller, part of the air conditioning system, lowers maintenance needed. The new Linganore High School has many skylights and windows, increasing natural light that can be directed indoors. Eight full-size computer labs, some of which are tiered, provide opportunities for students to use software and online resources for research and classroom activities. Additional subject-specific labs provide opportunities to use specialized software. Interactive electronic "Promethean Boards" were installed in nearly all classrooms; they serve as projectors for computers and can be used in a chalk-chalkboard manner. When it was built, it was the most state-of-the-art school in Frederick County.

== Academics ==
Linganore is noted for its wide selection of Advanced Placement (AP) courses, as well as a high pass rate for those who choose to take AP exams. A course guide for Frederick County Public Schools (FCPS) can be found at fcps.org. The school offers AM and PM Career and Technology Center classes. Project Lead the Way and college-level technology courses are offered at LHS.

In 2014, Linganore graduates were awarded $11.4 million in scholarship money. In 2015, graduates gained $7.5 million in scholarships.

== Athletics ==
Linganore is home to many sports teams, many of which have won state championships.

Sport	State championships won
Baseball	
Boys' basketball	2004
Girls' basketball	1992, 1996, 1997
Cheerleading	2017, 2019, 2021, 2023, 2025
Boys' cross country	1967, 1993, 1996, 2017
Girls' cross country	1993, 1994, 1995
Diving	
Field hockey	1980, 1993,2025
Football	1989, 1991, 1995, 2003, 2009, 2017, 2025
Golf	
Girls' lacrosse	
Boys' lacrosse	2011, 2016
Girls' soccer	2017
Boys' soccer	1998
Softball	2022
Swimming	2005, 2006, 2008
Tennis	
Boys' track	2011
Girls' track	1980, 1981, 1988, 1989, 1994, 1996
Boys' indoor track	2017, 2026
Girls' indoor track	1988, 1989, 1990, 1991, 1994, 1995, 2006
Volleyball	
Wrestling	2023, 2024
Ice hockey	
Girls flag football	2025

== Student life ==
=== Linganore High School Marching Band ===
The award-winning Linganore High School “Lancer” Marching Band is from Frederick, Maryland, and celebrated its 50th anniversary in 2012.

The performing arts program has won over a dozen Maryland state championships in percussion ensemble, indoor guard, marching band, and music technology. In 2015, the band performed in Washington, D.C. at the National World War II memorial to commemorate the 70th anniversary of the end of the war. Speakers included Commander Jack Raquepau and Elinor Otto, known as the last "Rosie the Riveter."

They have also performed at Walt Disney World and the St. Patrick's Day Parade in New York City.

=== Publications ===
The school paper is The Lance, distributed to students free of charge.

The Talisman, Linganore's yearbook, is published by the members of the publications class. The school has every Tailsman in the school's archives in the library, along with scrapbooks alumni have donated.

Beginning in 2013, Linganore converted its morning announcements into a student-run broadcast show. Episodes of The Morning Announcements are roughly five minutes long, up to 15 minutes if there is a special event, like student government elections.

Since 2022, the morning announcements have been produced by Principal Dr Michael Dillman and posted on YouTube.

=== Navy Junior Reserve Officers Training Corps ===
In 2015, the United States Department of the Navy moved the Linganore High School Navy Junior Reserve Officers Training Corps (NJROTC) unit to Governor Thomas Johnson High School. The program was at Linganore between 2003 and 2015 but was moved to be in a central location due to low enrollment.

== Demographics ==
These demographics are not current. The numbers represented are from the 2012-2013 school year.

- White: 1,434
- African American: 30
- Native American: 12
- Asian: 23
- Hawaiian/Pacific Islander: fewer than 10
- Hispanic: 90
- Two or more races: 68

== Notable alumni ==
- Joe Alexander (born 1986) - American-Israeli basketball player in the Israel Basketball Premier League
- Shannon Breen (born 1989) – American football player
- Cara Consuegra (born 1979) – College basketball coach at Marquette
- Shawn Hatosy (born 1975) – Actor, The Pitt and Chicago P.D.
- Rob Havenstein (born 1992) – American football offensive tackle for the Los Angeles Rams of the National Football League
- Linda Singh – Commander of the Maryland National Guard
- Zach Zwinak - American college football player
- Kris Fair - American politician who is a member of the Maryland House of Delegates serving District 3 in Frederick County, Maryland
- David R. Brinkley - American politician who served as the Secretary of Budget and Management in Maryland
