= Englar-Schweigart-Rinehart Farm =

Historic house in Maryland, United States

- U.S. National Register of Historic Places
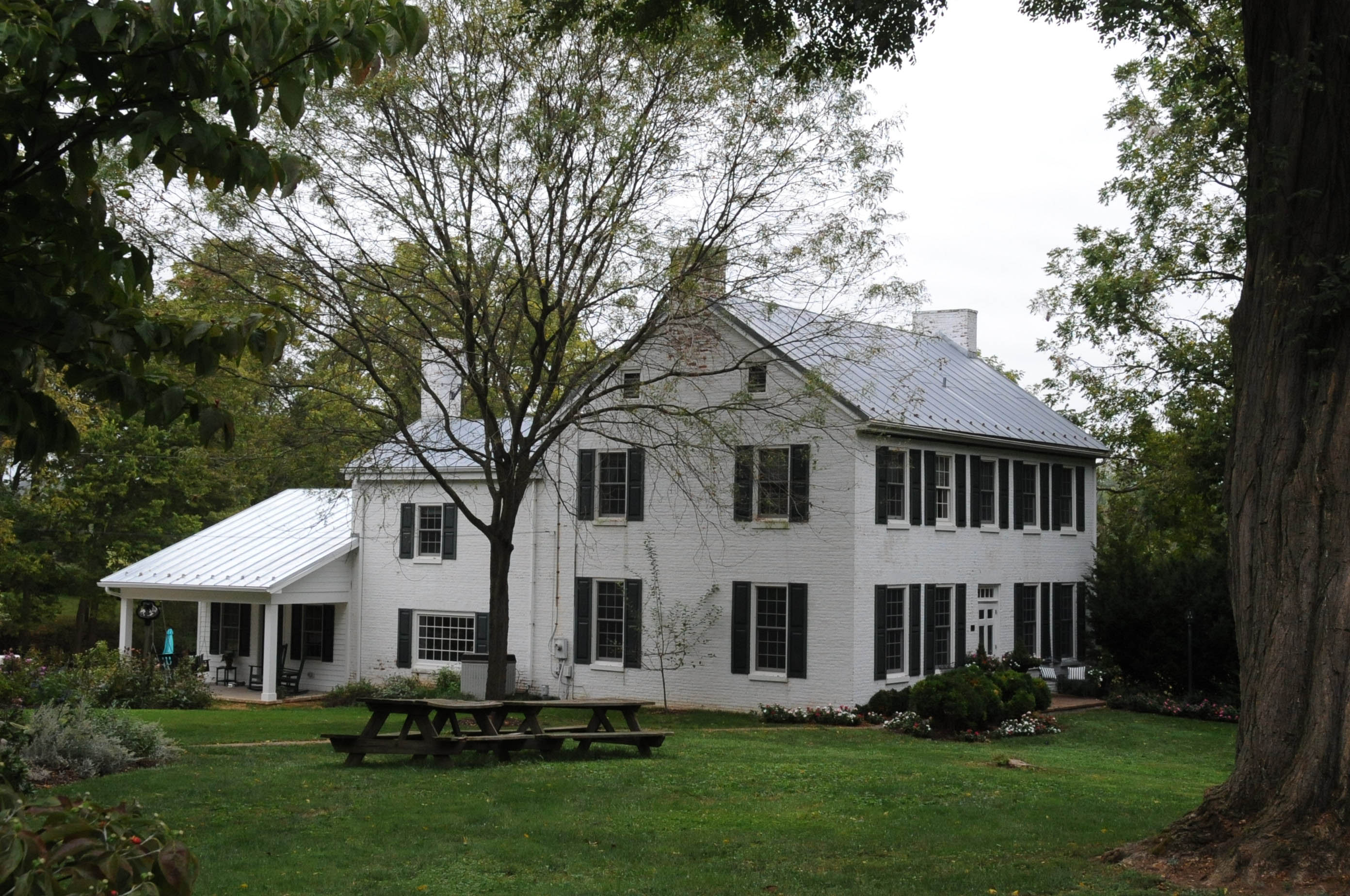

- Location within Maryland Location within the United States
- Location: 47 Rockland Rd., Westminster, Maryland
- Coordinates: 39°34′44.7″N 77°2′20.9″W
- Area: 15.4 acres (6.2 ha)
- Built: 1809
- Architectural style: Federal
- NRHP reference No.: 03001267
- Added to NRHP: December 10, 2003

The Englar-Schweigart-Rinehart Farm is a historic home and farm complex located at Westminster, Carroll County, Maryland, United States. It consists of a brick house, a brick smokehouse, a stone springhouse, a frame bank barn, and a frame poultry house. The house is a two-story, five-by-two-bay Flemish bond brick structure painted white, and set on a rubble stone foundation. The house was constructed in 1809 or 1810. The farm is significant for its illustration of how German-Swiss immigrants to Maryland became acculturated to the dominant English culture.

The Englar-Schweigart-Rinehart Farm was listed on the National Register of Historic Places in 2003.
