= Robert and Phyllis Scott House =

Historic house in Maryland, United States

- U.S. National Register of Historic Places
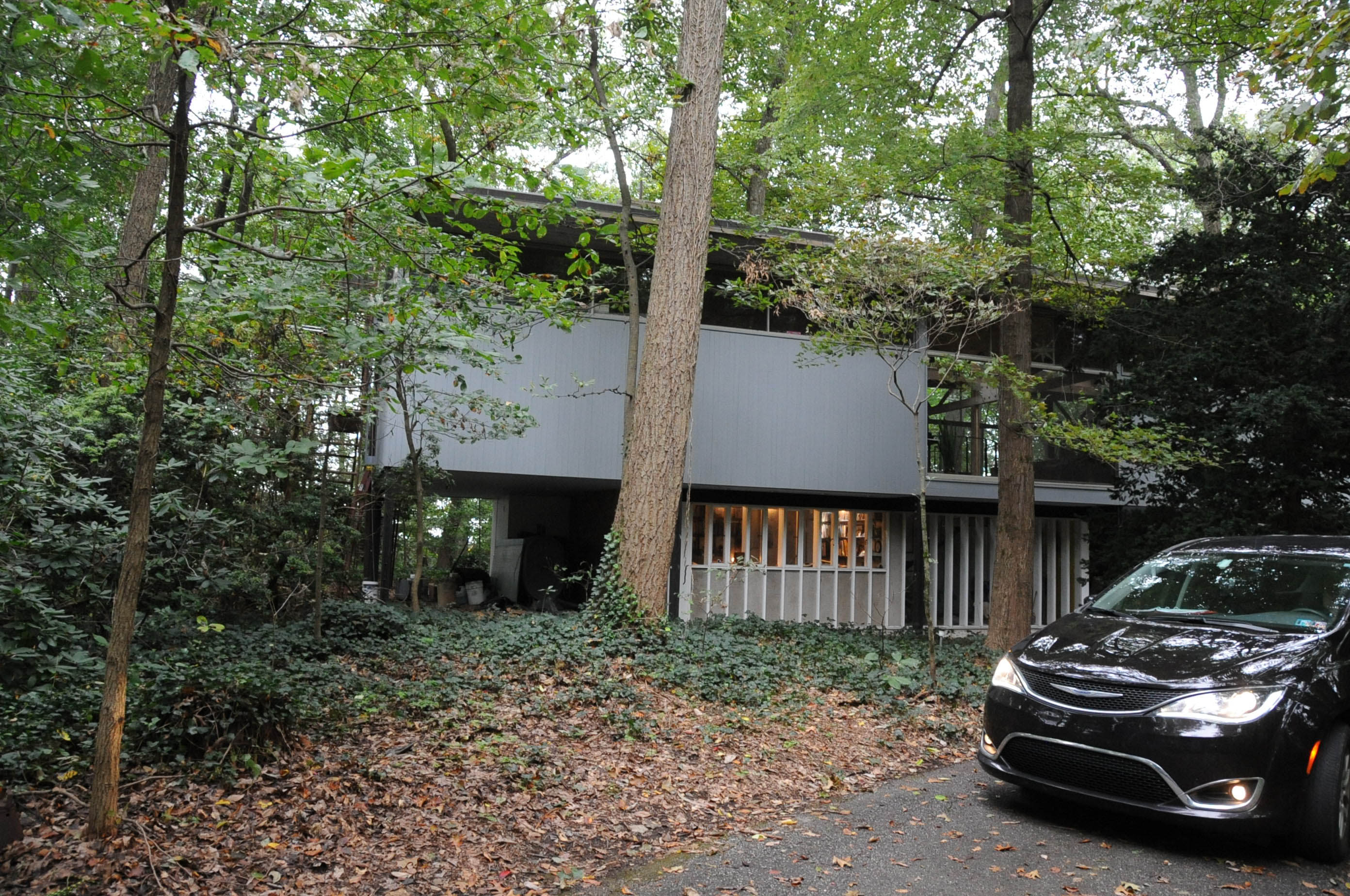

- Location within Maryland Location within the United States
- Location: 1805 Uniontown Road, Westminster, Maryland
- Coordinates: 39°35′12″N 77°3′40″W
- Area: 22.9 acres (9.3 ha)
- Built: 1953
- Built by: Hostetter Co., The
- Architect: Hebbeln, Henry
- Architectural style: International Style
- NRHP reference No.: 04001377
- Added to NRHP: December 23, 2004

The Robert and Phyllis Scott House is a historic home located at Westminster, Carroll County, Maryland, United States. It is situated atop a ridge on a heavily wooded lot and is a two-story, "butterfly roof", five-bay by two-bay rectangular International Style building set on piers, with several rooms on grade in the center of the house. The house was constructed in 1953–54 to the design of architect Henry Hebbeln of New York.

The Robert and Phyllis Scott House was listed on the National Register of Historic Places in 2003.
