= Monrovia, Maryland =

Census-designated place in the United States

- Census-designated place
- Location in Maryland Monrovia (the United States)
- Coordinates: 39°21′25″N 77°16′29″W
- Country: United States
- State: Maryland
- County: Frederick

Area
  - Total: 2.25 sq mi (5.82 km^{2})
  - Land: 2.25 sq mi (5.82 km^{2})
  - Water: 0 sq mi (0.00 km^{2})
- Elevation: 535 ft (163 m)

Population (2020)
  - Total: 2,702
  - Density: 1,203.4/sq mi (464.64/km^{2})
- Time zone: UTC−5 (Eastern (EST))
  - Summer (DST): UTC−4 (EDT)
- ZIP code: 21770
- Area codes: 301 and 240
- FIPS code: 24-53100
- GNIS feature ID: 2583659

Monrovia is an unincorporated community and census-designated place (CDP) in Frederick County, in the U.S. state of Maryland. As of the 2020 census it had a population of 2,702.

== Etymology ==
Though a post office was established in Monrovia on January 15, 1833, it is not known that the town was named Monrovia in the 1830s. In the 1820s, the town was known as "Hall Towne," likely after Nicholas Hall, a founder of New Market. When the name Monrovia was applied to the town is unknown, however why it was named such was either after the U.S. President James Monroe, or perhaps for an event described by Reverend Herbert Austin Cooper in 1997:

The California Gold Rush of 1848 played a part in that. Two men from this area went to California in search of gold. Unsuccessful there, they then heard of new gold discoveries in Monrovia, Liberia (West Africa). So they went there and worked in the Monrovia mines. In Liberia, one of the two men died. After the man died, they put his body in a fish barrel, used to preserve salt-water fish, and filled the barrel with alcohol to preserve the body. The barrel was then shipped all the way around Cape Horn and, ultimately, to the Port of Baltimore. From there, the body in a barrel went by rail to what is now Monrovia, Maryland. It was received at the general store there, and the alcohol was dumped into Bush Creek, after which they had a funeral service with Elder Walker presiding.

It was suggested by Reverend Cooper that this shipment from Monrovia, Liberia, resulted in the town along Bush Creek being named "Monrovia."

== Geography ==
The original unincorporated community of Monrovia is located along Maryland Route 75 (Green Valley Road) in southeastern Frederick County, 1 mile (1.6 km) south of New Market, Maryland. The Monrovia CDP extends south of the original Monrovia as far as Maryland Route 80 (Fingerboard Road) and west to include nearly all of Ed McClain Road. According to the U.S. Census Bureau, the Monrovia CDP has a total area of 2.2 square miles (5.8 km^{2}), all land.

== Demographics ==
=== 2020 census ===
As of the 2020 census, Monrovia had a population of 2,702. The median age was 35.2 years. 33.0% of residents were under the age of 18 and 6.9% of residents were 65 years of age or older. For every 100 females there were 91.6 males, and for every 100 females age 18 and over there were 94.5 males age 18 and over.

0.0% of residents lived in urban areas, while 100.0% lived in rural areas.

There were 821 households in Monrovia, of which 50.9% had children under the age of 18 living in them. Of all households, 77.6% were married-couple households, 8.4% were households with a male householder and no spouse or partner present, and 9.9% were households with a female householder and no spouse or partner present. About 7.7% of all households were made up of individuals and 3.7% had someone living alone who was 65 years of age or older.

There were 854 housing units, of which 3.9% were vacant. The homeowner vacancy rate was 1.6% and the rental vacancy rate was 0.0%.

Racial composition as of the 2020 census
Race	Number	Percent
White	1,544	57.1%
Black or African American	378	14.0%
American Indian and Alaska Native	6	0.2%
Asian	410	15.2%
Native Hawaiian and Other Pacific Islander	0	0.0%
Some other race	114	4.2%
Two or more races	250	9.3%
Hispanic or Latino (of any race)	297	11.0%

== Education ==
Monrovia is part of the Frederick County public school system.

School zoning is as follows: Green Valley Elementary School, Windsor Knolls Middle School, and Linganore High School.

There was redistricting in the fall of 2010.

== Transport ==
The two major roads in the area are Maryland Route 75 and Maryland Route 80. MD 80 leads west 4.5 miles (7.2 km) to Urbana and southeast 7 miles (11 km) to Damascus (via MD 27), while MD 75 leads north to New Market and I-70/US-40, and also south 5 miles (8 km) to Hyattstown and MD 355.

== History ==
In 1831, Monrovia became a station on the Baltimore and Ohio Railroad and provided service to the mills and access for travelers to New Market, MD. A watering station for the trains was built later in 1840. Monrovia was impacted by the Civil War with the Monrovia General Store, used as a dry goods store from the mid-nineteenth century until the early twentieth century, being sacked by Confederate troops after the Battle of Monocacy. During the Civil War, Monrovia also made the front page of the September 16, 1862 issue of The New York Herald:

"We pushed on to Monrovia Station, on the line of the Baltimore and Ohio Railroad, on the way to New Market, and while passing through an incident occurred well worth relating. I was riding in the rear when I was attracted by the most deafening shouts some distance ahead. I instantly went forward, and saw something that made me feel like shouting too. On a slight eminence on the side of the road stood two ladies and a little girl. In the child's hand was a small but very pretty American flag, which she was waving with all the ardor and enthusiasm of a youthful patriot. The men cheered until they were husky, and most of the officers, as they passed, took off their caps and saluted the national emblem. Upon conversing with the ladies I was informed that this was the only American flag that the rebels had left, and the reason for that was they could not find it. All the rest had been destroyed or carried away as trophies. The rebel cavalry destroyed here the post office and other government property. They left the place on Thursday afternoon, and fell back to New Market."

Monrovia was the largest community in the New Market election district in 1880. The Monrovia Central Trust Bank closed in 1929. Monrovia's largest employer, a cannery, closed in the 1930s. Another large employer, the Nicodemus Mill, also closed in the 1930s.

The 75-80 dragway opened in 1960. The track closed on October 30, 2005, with no plans to resume races. The closing prompted a significant public response, and renovations to the dragway began in 2007. The track reopened on April 3, 2009. The track closed for the final time on September 28, 2013, and was planned to be replaced by a housing development. However, the TV show MotorWeek, which had been using the Dragway for its car tests since 1982, continued to use the remnants of the drag strip until partway through its 40th season in 2021, and even still credited the Dragway in its end credits. The show has since moved to the Mason-Dixon Dragway in Boonsboro.

A developer owns land in Monrovia and had proposed building Monrovia Town Center, which was planned to consist of 930 single-family homes, 580 townhomes, and retail. The developer later revised the plan, reserving half of the homes for residents who are at least 55 years old, reducing the number of homes from 1,510 to 1,250, and reducing the size of the development from 457 to 392 acres (1.8 to 1.6 km^{2}). Residents have testified at meetings of the Frederick County Planning Commission to voice their disagreement with the proposed development, saying that the development would overburden the area's roads and schools and change the rural character of the area. In 2014, Frederick County's Board of County Commissioners voted to change the area's zoning. After a lawsuit against the Monrovia Town Center by Residents Against Landsdale Expansion (RALE) was won in 2017 in Frederick County Circuit Court, the Maryland Court of Special Appeals upheld the lower court decision in 2019, and later Maryland's Court of Appeals upheld the ruling in 2020.
