= Ballenger Creek =

Stream in the U.S. state of Maryland

Coordinates: 39°21′45″N 77°24′36″W

Ballenger Creek is a 10.7-mile-long (17.2 km) tributary of the Monocacy River in Frederick County, Maryland. The headwaters of the creek are located on the east slope of Catoctin Mountain, about 3 miles (5 km) west of the city of Frederick. The stream runs roughly southeast to the Monocacy National Battlefield and the confluence with the Monocacy River, which drains to the Potomac River. The watershed area of the creek is 21.8 square miles (56 km^{2}).

== See also ==
- List of Maryland rivers
