= Buckeystown Historic District =

Historic district in Maryland, United States

- U.S. National Register of Historic Places
- U.S. Historic district
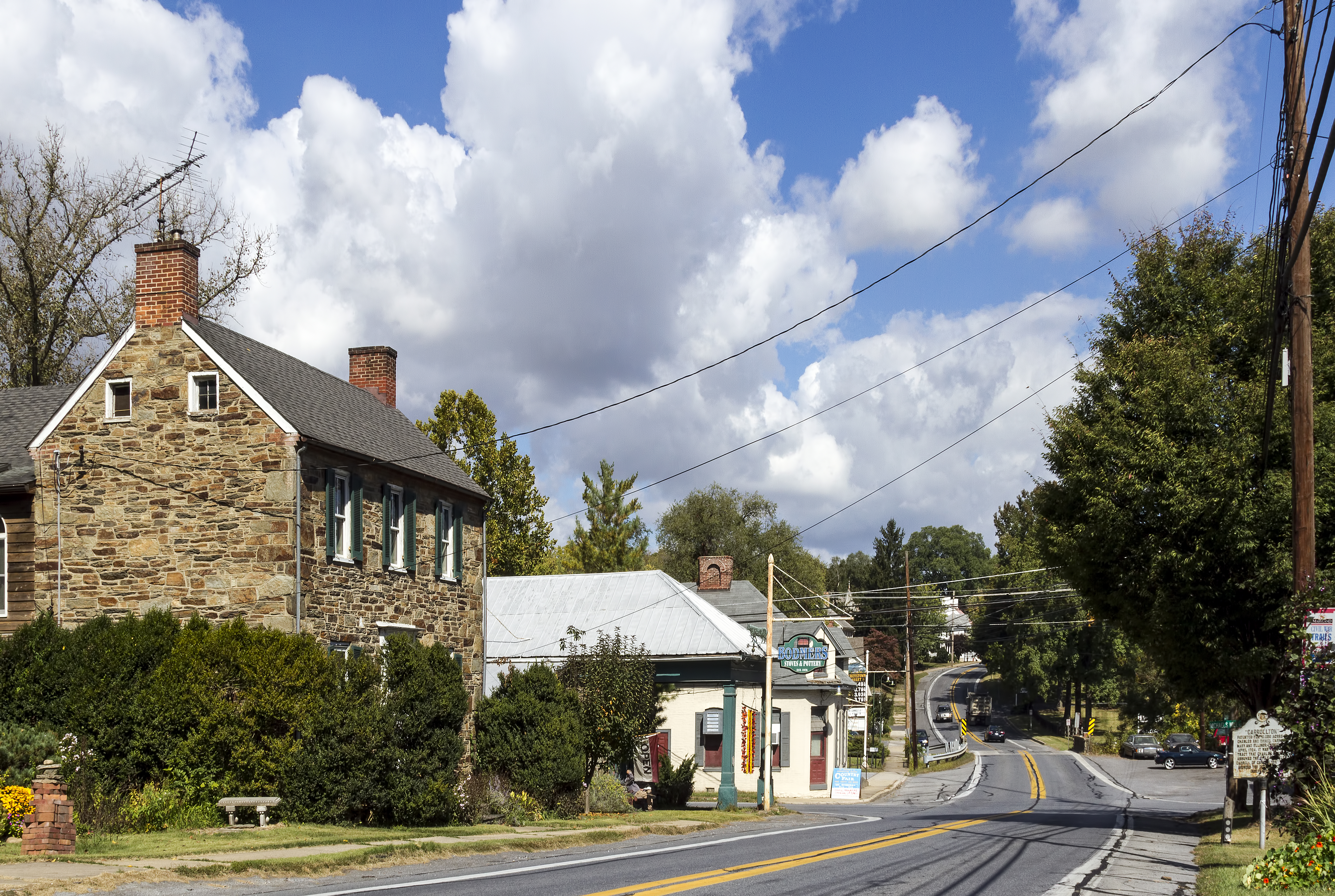
- The center of Buckeystown

- Location within Maryland Location within the United States
- Location: MD 85, Buckeystown, Maryland
- Coordinates: 39°19′53″N 77°26′4″W
- Area: 150 acres (61 ha)
- Built: 1850
- Architectural style: Colonial Revival, Gothic, Queen Anne
- NRHP reference No.: 82002811
- Added to NRHP: April 6, 1982

The Buckeystown Historic District includes the majority of the small town of Buckeystown, Maryland, an unincorporated community located in Frederick County, Maryland, USA. It is named for George Buckey, a tanner, and his brother, John Buckey, a blacksmith and tavern owner. Buckeystown is on the U.S National Register of Historic Places and the Maryland Civil War Trail due to its rich history and beautiful examples of Queen Anne and Victorian style houses, along with a small commercial center. Each historic home has a plaque indicating the year built, the earliest being circa 1780. There are also several historical information plaques installed along the main street.

== History ==
The land Buckeystown now sits on was once called "Good Luck." It began as a 400-acre (1.6 km^{2}) parcel given to Meredith Davis by the King of England in 1731. Over time, more land was added to the original tract. A road that stretched from Pennsylvania to Florida bisected the town and sealed the area's fate: it was the perfect place for enterprising families to settle. The town grew due to the prosperity of several businesses which took advantage of the natural resources the location provided. Two mills were located along the Monocacy River, which runs behind the southside of town, the tannery and an ice creamery utilized a natural spring, and a brickworks used the naturally occurring lime.

Buckeystown enjoyed 100 years of prosperity from the mid-19th century to the mid-20th century. Several wealthy families began to dominate the town's social scene. These families built the lavish mansions and proud stone homes which still grace the main streets today. Buckeystown's early industrial center gradually faded, leaving a well-preserved residential district with a particular emphasis on the 1870-1910 period.

The main thoroughfare, currently known as Buckeystown Pike or Maryland State Highway 85, was used during both the Revolutionary War and the Civil War. Soldiers marched through town towards decisive battles, following leaders including Stonewall Jackson and General Robert E. Lee.

== Present day ==
The old General Store and a beautiful example of a Buckeystown home. Image modified from photo by J. Cosham

The small community of Buckeystown has several businesses including Hedgeapple Farm, the Buckeystown Market (a pub), the Frederick Inn Bed and Breakfast (formally known as The Inn at Buckeystown), Bodmers Stoves and Pottery, Maynes Farm, a convenience store and gas station, an antique store, two car clinics, a law firm and a veterinary hospital. Buckeystown Park, by the river on Michael's Mill Road, provides residents with grills, horseshoe pits, picnic shelters and a jungle gym. Four books have been written about Buckeystown history and architecture by resident, Nancy Bodmer. Until recently the town held Victorian House Tours.

== Demographics ==
The median age for Buckeystown residents is 42.0. There are 39 men and 29 women. Buckeystown is located at 39.334N and -77.431W. Average town elevation is 334 feet.
