= Union Bridge, Maryland =

- Town
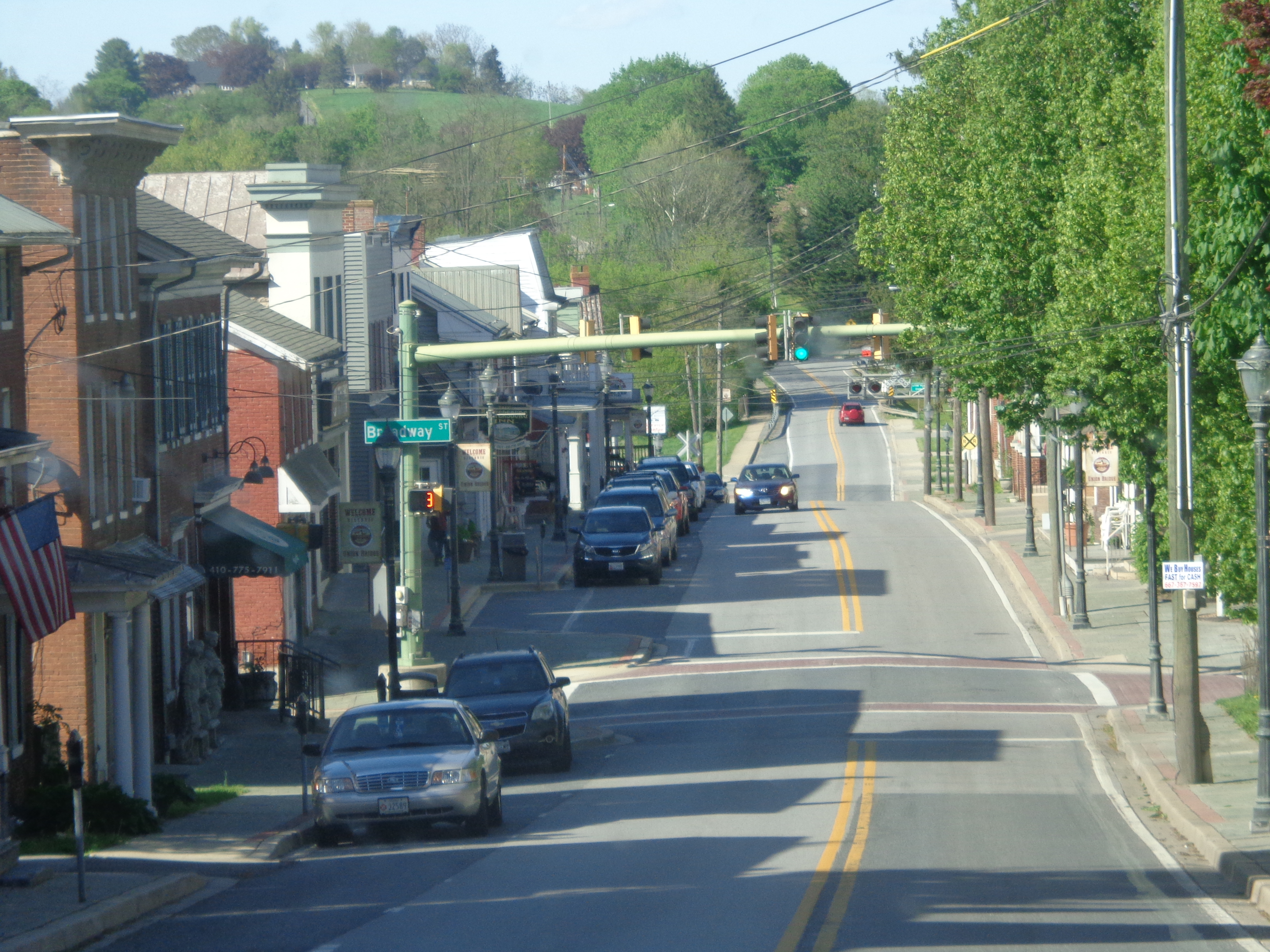
- Main Street in 2019

- Flag Seal

- Coordinates: 39°34′7″N 77°10′39″W
- Country: United States
- State: Maryland
- County: Carroll
- Incorporated: 1872

Government
  - Mayor: Perry Jones (R)

Area
  - Total: 1.03 sq mi (2.68 km^{2})
  - Land: 1.03 sq mi (2.67 km^{2})
  - Water: 0.0077 sq mi (0.02 km^{2})
- Elevation: 456 ft (139 m)

Population (2020)
  - Total: 936
  - Density: 909.2/sq mi (351.05/km^{2})
- Time zone: UTC-5 (Eastern (EST))
  - Summer (DST): UTC-4 (EDT)
- ZIP code: 21791
- Area codes: 410, 443, 667
- FIPS code: 24-79350
- GNIS feature ID: 0591452
- Website: townofub.org

Union Bridge is a town in Carroll County, Maryland, United States. The population was 936 at the 2020 census.

Much of the town was added to the National Register of Historic Places as the Union Bridge Historic District in 1994.

== Geography ==
Union Bridge is located at 39°34′7″N 77°10′39″W (39.568550, -77.177618).

According to the United States Census Bureau, the town has a total area of 1.05 square miles (2.72 km^{2}), of which 1.04 square miles (2.69 km^{2}) is land and 0.01 square miles (0.03 km^{2}) is water.

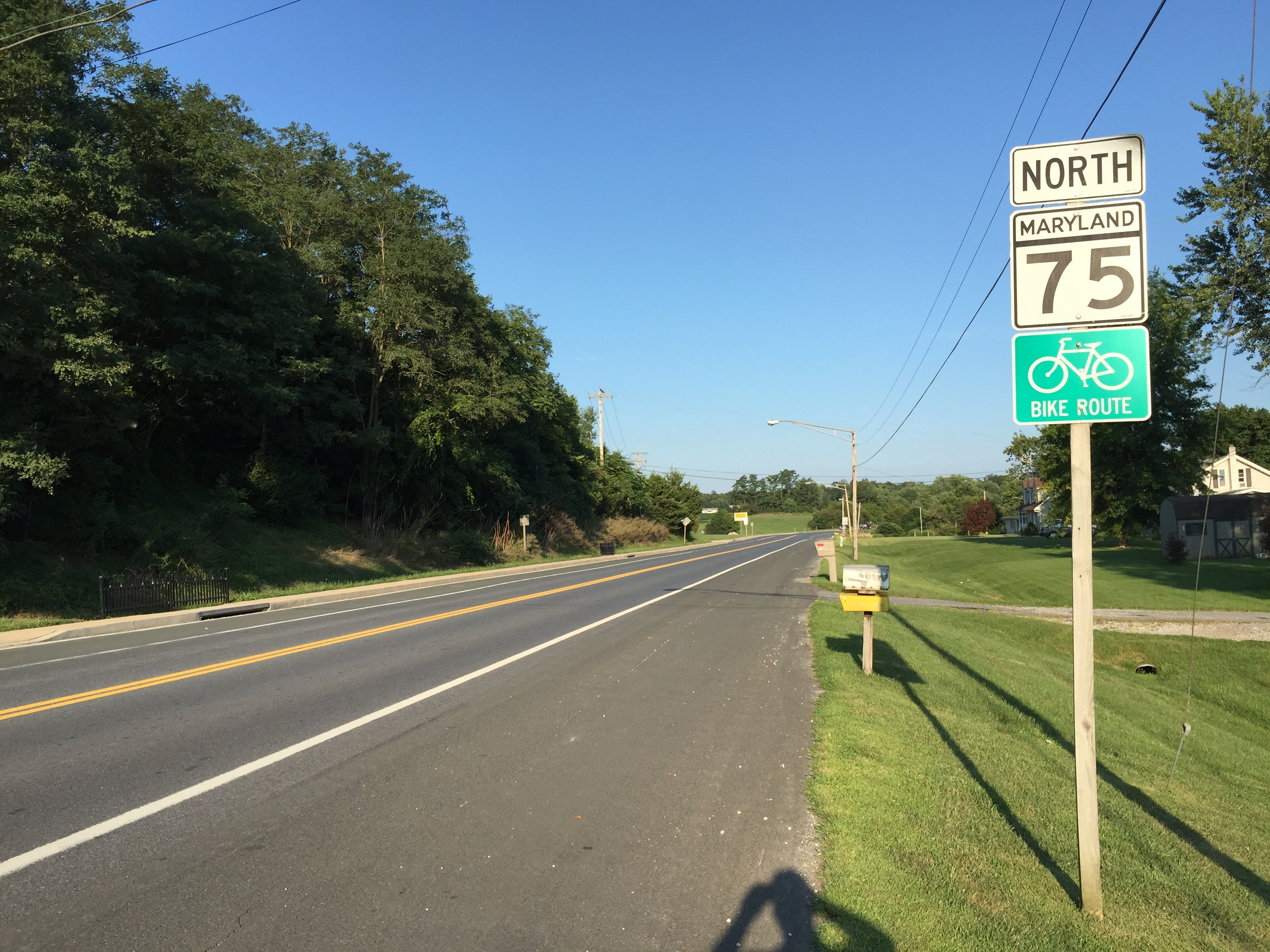
MD 75 heading northeast out of Union Bridge

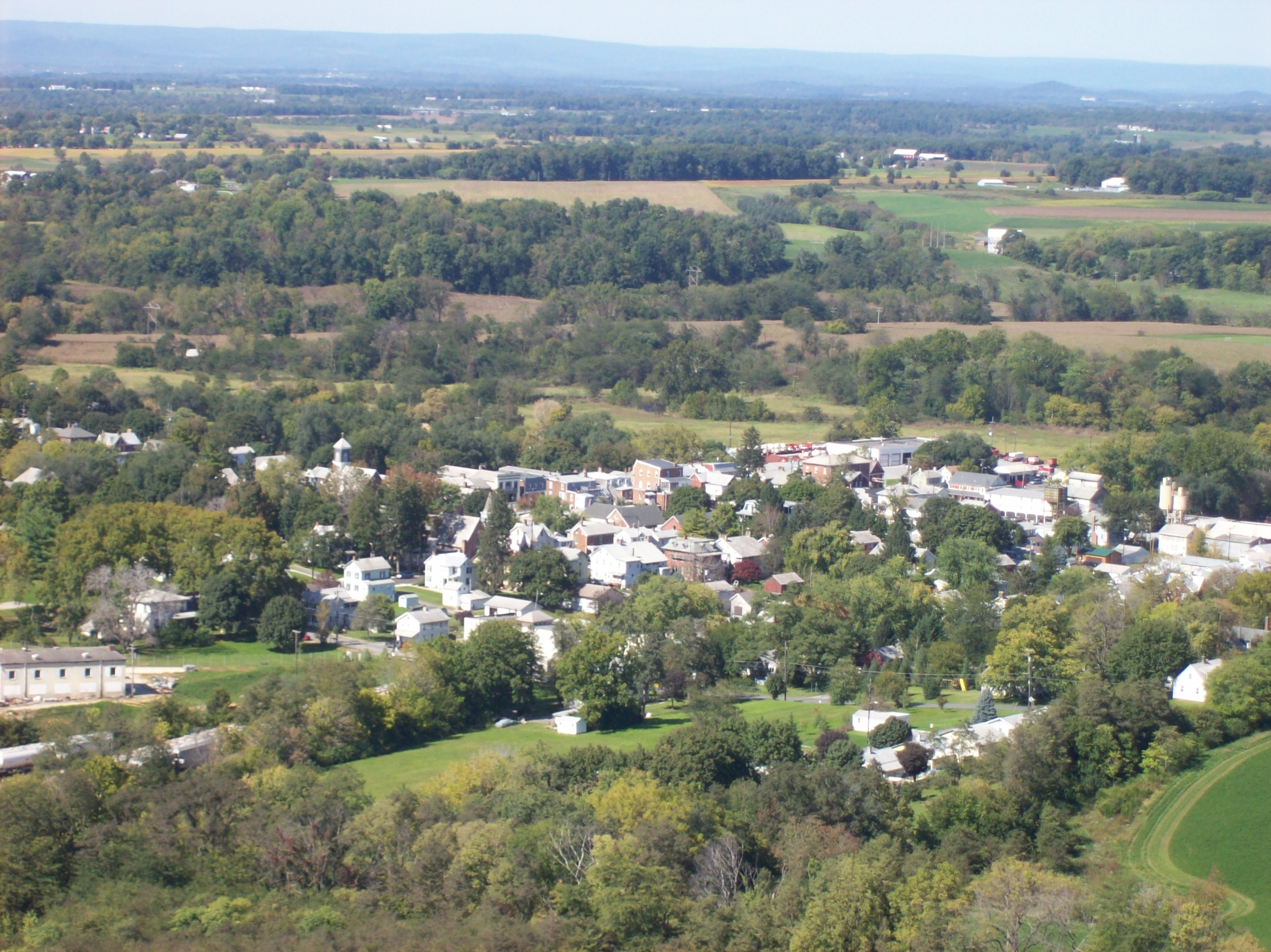
Birds-eye view of Union Bridge

== Transportation ==
The primary method of travel to and from Union Bridge is by road. The only primary highway serving the town is Maryland Route 75, which follows Green Valley Road and Main Street through Union Bridge. From Union Bridge, MD 75 connects southward to Libertytown and New Market, and turns eastward to New Windsor.

The Maryland Midland Railway is a shortline railroad headquartered in Union Bridge, which is located on the railway's east-west line between Highfield and Emory Grove. Also in Union Bridge lies their main customer, the Heidelberg Materials (former Lehigh Cement) plant.

== Demographics ==
Historical population
Census	Pop.	Note	%±
1870	323		—
1880	570		76.5%
1890	743		30.4%
1900	663		−10.8%
1910	804		21.3%
1920	1,082		34.6%
1930	862		−20.3%
1940	831		−3.6%
1950	840		1.1%
1960	833		−0.8%
1970	904		8.5%
1980	927		2.5%
1990	910		−1.8%
2000	989		8.7%
2010	975		−1.4%
2020	936		−4.0%
U.S. Decennial Census

=== 2010 census ===
As of the census of 2010, there were 975 people, 394 households, and 251 families living in the town. The population density was 937.5 inhabitants per square mile (362.0/km^{2}). There were 429 housing units at an average density of 412.5 per square mile (159.3/km^{2}). The racial makeup of the town was 91.7% White, 5.1% African American, 0.3% Native American, 0.7% from other races, and 2.2% from two or more races. Hispanic or Latino of any race were 1.4% of the population.

There were 394 households, of which 34.0% had children under the age of 18 living with them, 44.2% were married couples living together, 13.2% had a female householder with no husband present, 6.3% had a male householder with no wife present, and 36.3% were non-families. 29.7% of all households were made up of individuals, and 14.7% had someone living alone who was 65 years of age or older. The average household size was 2.47 and the average family size was 3.06.

The median age in the town was 39.2 years. 23.9% of residents were under the age of 18; 10.6% were between the ages of 18 and 24; 24.3% were from 25 to 44; 26.2% were from 45 to 64; and 15.1% were 65 years of age or older. The gender makeup of the town was 48.6% male and 51.4% female.

=== 2000 census ===
As of the census of 2000, there were 989 people, 372 households, and 265 families living in the town. The population density was 1,163.1 inhabitants per square mile (449.1/km^{2}). There were 409 housing units at an average density of 481.0 per square mile (185.7/km^{2}). The racial makeup of the town was 92.82% White, 5.56% African American, 0.40% Native American, 0.10% Asian, and 1.11% from two or more races. Hispanic or Latino of any race were 0.51% of the population.

There were 372 households, out of which 36.8% had children under the age of 18 living with them, 53.0% were married couples living together, 13.2% had a female householder with no husband present, and 28.5% were non-families. 22.8% of all households were made up of individuals, and 7.8% had someone living alone who was 65 years of age or older. The average household size was 2.66 and the average family size was 3.11.

In the town, the population was spread out, with 28.9% under the age of 18, 6.3% from 18 to 24, 30.3% from 25 to 44, 21.3% from 45 to 64, and 13.1% who were 65 years of age or older. The median age was 36 years. For every 100 females, there were 96.6 males. For every 100 females age 18 and over, there were 92.1 males.

The median income for a household in the town was $36,250, and the median income for a family was $37,500. Males had a median income of $31,563 versus $20,083 for females. The per capita income for the town was $17,827. About 10.6% of families and 13.7% of the population were below the poverty line, including 21.8% of those under age 18 and 5.7% of those age 65 or over.

== Notable people ==
- John Hanson Farquhar, U.S. Representative for Indiana
- Bill Oakley, former co-executive producer and head writer for The Simpsons and Mission Hill
- William Henry Rinehart, noted sculptor

== See also ==
- Maryland Midland Railway
- Union Bridge Station, historic railway station
- List of municipalities in Maryland
- National Register of Historic Places listings in Carroll County, Maryland
