= National Register of Historic Places listings in Carroll County, Maryland =

Location of Carroll County in Maryland

This is a list of the National Register of Historic Places listings in Carroll County, Maryland.

This is intended to be a complete list of the properties and districts on the National Register of Historic Places in Carroll County, Maryland, United States. Latitude and longitude coordinates are provided for many National Register properties and districts; these locations may be seen together in a map.

There are 62 properties and districts listed on the National Register in the county, including 1 National Historic Landmark.

Contents: Counties in Maryland
Allegany - Anne Arundel - Baltimore (city) - Baltimore County - Calvert - Caroline - Carroll - Cecil - Charles - Dorchester - Frederick - Garrett - Harford - Howard - Kent - Montgomery - Prince George's - Queen Anne's - Somerset - St. Mary's - Talbot - Washington - Wicomico - Worcester

This National Park Service list is complete through NPS recent listings posted May 1, 2026.

== Current listings ==
	Name on the Register	Image	Date listed	Location	City or town	Description
1	Antrim	Antrim	September 16, 1977 (#77000686)	30 Trevanion Road, Taneytown, MD, 21787; 39°39′15″N 77°10′29″W	Taneytown	
2	Appler-Englar House	Appler-Englar House	April 5, 2001 (#01000338)	916 Winter's Church Rd. 39°33′13″N 77°07′42″W	New Windsor	
3	Philip and Uriah Arter Farm	Philip and Uriah Arter Farm	December 12, 2006 (#06001124)	10 Deep Run Rd., W. 39°40′10″N 77°00′50″W	Union Mills	
4	Solomon Arter House	Solomon Arter House	September 10, 1987 (#87001569)	4029 Geeting Rd. 39°41′11″N 76°59′27″W	Union Mills	
5	Avalon	Avalon	September 3, 1987 (#87001407)	1111 Slingluff Road; 39°32′30″N 77°05′38″W	New Windsor	
6	Avondale	Avondale	October 10, 1975 (#75000877)	501 Stone Chapel Road; 39°33′33″N 77°01′49″W	Westminster	
7	Bennett-Kelly Farm	Bennett-Kelly Farm	December 23, 2004 (#04001378)	5842 Oakland Rd. 39°24′51″N 76°53′46″W	Sykesville	
8	William and Catherine Biggs Farm	William and Catherine Biggs Farm	November 2, 2001 (#01001197)	8212 Sixes Bridge Rd. 39°37′40″N 77°17′12″W	Detour	
9	Branton Manor	Branton Manor	August 18, 1978 (#78001450)	2819 Old Liberty Rd. 39°23′42″N 76°53′43″W	Sykesville	
10	Moses Brown House	Moses Brown House	December 11, 1980 (#80001800)	Southeast of Eldersburg at 7604 Ridge Rd. 39°23′18″N 76°55′36″W	Eldersburg	
11	Carroll County Almshouse and Farm	Carroll County Almshouse and Farm	December 4, 1975 (#75000878)	500 S. Center St. 39°33′30″N 76°59′44″W	Westminster	
12	Whittaker Chambers Farm	Whittaker Chambers Farm	May 17, 1988 (#88001824)	E. Saw Mill Rd. 39°39′35″N 76°58′35″W	Westminster	
13	Cold Saturday	Cold Saturday	December 11, 2008 (#08001174)	3251 Gamber Rd. 39°29′07″N 76°54′09″W	Finksburg	
14	Cover's Tannery	Cover's Tannery	September 27, 2019 (#100004486)	626 Francis Scott Key Hwy. 39°35′33″N 77°14′25″W	Keymar	
15	Englar-Schweigart-Rinehart Farm	Englar-Schweigart-Rinehart Farm	December 10, 2003 (#03001267)	47 Rockland Rd. 39°34′50″N 77°02′20″W	Westminster	
16	Christopher Erb House	Christopher Erb House	June 19, 1985 (#85001269)	3333 Flickinger Rd. 39°39′52″N 77°05′06″W	Silver Run	
17	Farm Content	Farm Content	June 20, 1975 (#75000879)	1221 Old New Windsor Pike (MD 852); 39°33′31″N 77°02′30″W	Westminster	
18	Friendship Valley Farm	Friendship Valley Farm	September 16, 1977 (#77000688)	South of Westminster at 950 Gist Rd. 39°32′49″N 77°00′04″W	Westminster	
19	Andrew P. Frizzell House and Farm Complex	Andrew P. Frizzell House and Farm Complex	September 11, 1986 (#86002391)	3801 Salem Bottom Rd. 39°27′30″N 77°03′08″W	Westminster	
20	Hampstead School	Hampstead School	December 27, 2002 (#02001575)	1211 N. Main St. 39°36′28″N 76°50′59″W	Hampstead	
21	Hard Lodging	Hard Lodging	June 9, 1978 (#78001451)	4623 Ladiesburg Road; 39°33′54″N 77°09′56″W	Union Bridge	
22	Isaac Hoffman House		July 25, 1985 (#85001612)	364 Shamer Lane; 39°35′18″N 76°53′20″W	Houcksville	
23	Hopewell	Hopewell	December 8, 1980 (#80001803)	Pearre and Clemsonville Rds. 39°31′48″N 77°10′13″W	Union Bridge	
24	Keefer-Brubaker Farm		December 20, 2007 (#07001286)	2719 Roop Rd. 39°39′22″N 77°12′13″W	Taneytown	
25	Jacob Koons Farm	Jacob Koons Farm	May 25, 2011 (#11000306)	1151 Otterdale Mill Rd. 39°36′37″N 77°10′12″W	Taneytown vicinity	
26	Lineboro Historic District	Lineboro Historic District	November 15, 1996 (#96001350)	Main St, Church to Mill Sts. 39°36′27″N 76°10′04″W	Lineboro	
27	Linwood Historic District	Linwood Historic District	September 27, 1980 (#80001801)	McKinstry's Mill Rd. 39°33′39″N 77°08′30″W	Linwood	
28	McKinstry's Mills Historic District	McKinstry's Mills Historic District	April 16, 1997 (#97000338)	1494, 1498, and 10904 McKinstry's Mill Rd., 4500 and 4504 Sam's Creek Rd. 39°32′00″N 77°09′32″W	Union Bridge	
29	McMurray-Frizzell-Aldridge Farm	McMurray-Frizzell-Aldridge Farm	April 13, 2001 (#01000339)	3708 Baker Rd. 39°28′19″N 77°03′20″W	Westminster	
30	Meadow Brook Farm	Meadow Brook Farm	July 25, 1985 (#85001622)	1006 Taneytown Pike; 39°35′31″N 77°01′52″W	Westminster	
31	Mount Airy Historic District	Mount Airy Historic District	September 13, 1984 (#84001589)	Roughly Main, Church, Maple, Park, Hill, and Warfield Sts. 39°22′31″N 77°09′21″W	Mount Airy	
32	Mt. Pleasant	Mt. Pleasant	November 4, 1998 (#98001260)	200 W. Locust St. 39°34′28″N 77°10′57″W	Union Bridge	
33	New Windsor Historic District	New Windsor Historic District	August 21, 1997 (#97000925)	Roughly bounded by Park, and Springdale Aves., New Windsor Rd., Lambert Ave., Coe Dr., and Maine St. 39°32′33″N 77°06′21″W	New Windsor	
34	Old National Pike Milestones	Old National Pike Milestones	November 27, 1975 (#75002107)	U.S. Route 40, U.S. Route 40 Alternate, and U.S. Route 40 Scenic, and Maryland Routes 144 and 165; 39°25′13″N 77°16′01″W	Mount Airy	
35	John Orendorff Farm	John Orendorff Farm	March 7, 1997 (#97000102)	412 Old Bachman's Valley Rd. 39°37′04″N 76°59′16″W	Westminster	
36	Pipe Creek Friends Meetinghouse	Pipe Creek Friends Meetinghouse	November 7, 1976 (#76000983)	Quaker Hill Rd. 39°33′48″N 77°10′13″W	Union Bridge	
37	Rockland Farm	Rockland Farm	August 21, 1986 (#86001730)	201 Rockland Rd. 39°34′30″N 77°02′50″W	Westminster	
38	Roop's Mill	Roop's Mill	October 31, 2008 (#08000796)	1001 and 1019 Taneytown Pike; 39°35′30″N 77°02′02″W	Westminster	
39	Christian Royer House	Christian Royer House	November 7, 1979 (#79001119)	North of Westminster on Fridinger Mill Rd. 39°37′32″N 76°57′57″W	Westminster	
40	Ludwick Rudisel Tannery House	Ludwick Rudisel Tannery House	November 10, 1980 (#80001802)	65 Frederick St. 39°39′27″N 77°10′45″W	Taneytown	
41	Robert and Phyllis Scott House	Robert and Phyllis Scott House	December 23, 2004 (#04001377)	1805 Uniontown Rd. 39°35′12″N 77°03′40″W	Westminster	
42	Jacob F. Shaffer Farm	Jacob F. Shaffer Farm	October 22, 1998 (#98001259)	4758 Schalk Road One; 39°42′00″N 76°49′48″W	Millers	
43	Slagle-Byers House	Slagle-Byers House	June 21, 2007 (#07000566)	1624 Littlestown Pike; 39°37′17″N 76°59′51″W	Westminster	
44	Springfield Presbyterian Church	Springfield Presbyterian Church	July 31, 1986 (#86002110)	7300 Spout Hill Rd. 39°22′27″N 76°58′24″W	Sykesville	
45	Stoner-Saum Farm	Stoner-Saum Farm	December 6, 1996 (#96001415)	1500 McKinstry's Mill Rd. 39°32′05″N 77°09′54″W	Union Bridge	
46	Sykesville Historic District	Sykesville Historic District	September 25, 1985 (#85002498)	Main St. and Springfield, Norwood, and Mellor Aves. 39°22′05″N 76°58′09″W	Sykesville	
47	Taneytown Historic District	Taneytown Historic District	October 9, 1986 (#86002850)	Maryland Routes 140 and 194; 39°39′30″N 77°10′26″W	Taneytown	
48	Taylor-Manning-Leppo House	Taylor-Manning-Leppo House	July 15, 2009 (#09000519)	2600 Patapsco Rd. 39°32′27″N 76°54′00″W	Finksburg	
49	Terra Rubra	Terra Rubra	July 24, 1978 (#78001449)	1755 Keysville Bruceville Road; 39°37′30″N 77°14′56″W	Keysville	
50	Trevanion	Trevanion	September 15, 1977 (#77000687)	1800 Trevanion Rd. 39°37′28″N 77°07′01″W	Uniontown	
51	Union Bridge Historic District	Union Bridge Historic District	August 17, 1994 (#94000820)	Roughly bounded by Bellevue, E. Locust, Buttersburg Alley, Church, Whyte, W. Locust, and the Western Maryland Railway tracks 39°34′03″N 77°10′40″W	Union Bridge	
52	Union Bridge Station	Union Bridge Station	November 7, 1976 (#76000984)	41 N. Main Street (MD 35); 39°34′14″N 77°10′39″W	Union Bridge	Operated by the Western Maryland Railway
53	Union Mills Homestead Historic District	Union Mills Homestead Historic District	January 25, 1971 (#71000371)	Junction of U.S. Route 140 and Deep Run Rd. 39°40′14″N 77°00′58″W	Westminster	
54	Uniontown Academy	Uniontown Academy	August 14, 1973 (#73000911)	Uniontown Rd. 39°35′32″N 77°10′57″W	Uniontown	
55	Uniontown Historic District	Uniontown Historic District	January 3, 1986 (#86000059)	Uniontown and Trevanion Rds. 39°35′40″N 77°06′55″W	Uniontown	
56	Warfield Complex, Hubner, and T Buildings	Warfield Complex, Hubner, and T Buildings	November 2, 2000 (#00001271)	Springfield Hospital Center; 39°22′43″N 76°57′41″W	Sykesville	
57	Weaver-Fox House	Weaver-Fox House	November 20, 1975 (#75000876)	3411 Main St. (Uniontown Rd.); 39°35′36″N 77°06′53″W	Uniontown	
58	Wesley Chapel Methodist Episcopal Church	Wesley Chapel Methodist Episcopal Church	March 22, 1984 (#84001593)	Liberty and Johnsville Rds. 39°24′26″N 76°57′45″W	Eldersburg	
59	Western Maryland College Historic District	Western Maryland College Historic District	March 26, 1976 (#76000985)	W. Main and College Sts. 39°34′53″N 77°00′09″W	Westminster	
60	Westminster Historic District	Westminster Historic District	August 6, 1980 (#80001804)	Maryland Routes 32 and 97; 39°34′30″N 76°59′43″W	Westminster	
61	Wilson's Inheritance	Wilson's Inheritance	June 19, 1985 (#85001270)	4400 Green Valley Rd. 39°34′16″N 77°09′35″W	Union Bridge	
62	Winemiller Family Farm	Winemiller Family Farm	August 30, 2006 (#06000743)	1909 Francis Scott Key Highway (Maryland Route 194); 39°37′46″N 77°13′12″W	Taneytown	

== See also ==
- List of National Historic Landmarks in Maryland
- National Register of Historic Places listings in Maryland
