= Frizzell =

Frizzell is a surname. Notable people with the surname include:

- Alan Frizzell (born 1995), Scottish footballer
- Colin Frizzell (born 1971), Canadian author of young adult novels
- David Frizzell (born 1941), American country music singer, younger brother of Lefty Frizzell
- David Frizzell (politician), Republican member of the Indiana House of Representatives
- Dick Frizzell (born 1943), New Zealand artist
- Donald L. Frizzell (1906–1972), American paleontologist, geologist and malacologist
- Gregory Kent Frizzell (born 1956), United States federal judge for the United States District Court for the Northern District of Oklahoma
- Henry F. Frizzell (1839–1904), Union Army soldier and Medal of Honor recipient
- Jimmy Frizzell (1937–2016), Scottish association football player and manager
- John Frizzell (screenwriter), Canadian screenwriter
- John Frizzell (composer) (born 1966), American composer
- Lefty Frizzell (1928–1975), American country music singer, songwriter and exponent of honky tonk music
- Lou Frizzell (1919–1979), American actor and music director
- Mary Frizzell (1913–1972), Canadian athlete who competed in the 1932 Summer Olympics
- Miles Frizzell (born 2004), American musician and singer-songwriter, member of The Bootleg Beatles and The Fab Four, great nephew of Lefty and David Frizzell
- William Frizzell (born 1962), American football defensive back

== See also ==
- Frizzell Hotsprings, hot spring on the south bank of the Skeena River, near Prince Rupert, British Columbia, Canada
- Andrew P. Frizzell House and Farm Complex, historic home and farm complex at Westminster, Carroll County, Maryland, United States
- McMurray-Frizzell-Aldridge Farm, historic home and farm complex located at Westminster, Carroll County, Maryland, United States
- Frisell
- Frizzle (disambiguation)
