= Maryland Route 194 =

State highway in Maryland, United States

Maryland Route 194
- Maryland Route 194 highlighted in red

Route information
- Maintained by MDSHA
- Length: 23.87 mi (38.42 km)
- Existed: 1956–present

Major junctions
- South end: MD 26 in Ceresville
- MD 550 in Woodsboro; MD 77 in Keymar; MD 140 in Taneytown
- North end: PA 194 near Taneytown

Location
- Country: United States
- State: Maryland
- Counties: Frederick, Carroll

Highway system
- Maryland highway system; Interstate; US; State; Scenic Byways
← MD 193	→ I-195

Maryland Route 194 (MD 194) is a state highway in the U.S. state of Maryland. The state highway runs 23.87 miles (38.42 km) from MD 26 in Ceresville north to the Pennsylvania state line near Taneytown, where the highway continues as Pennsylvania Route 194 (PA 194) toward Hanover. MD 194 is the main highway between Frederick and Hanover; the state highway connects the towns of Walkersville and Woodsboro in northeastern Frederick County with Keymar and Taneytown in northwestern Carroll County. MD 194 was blazed as a migration route in the 18th century and a pair of turnpikes in Frederick County in the 19th century, one of which was the last private toll road in Maryland. The state highway, which was originally designated MD 71, was built as a modern highway in Frederick County in the mid-1920s and constructed as Francis Scott Key Highway in Carroll County in the late 1920s and early 1930s. MD 194 received its modern route number in 1956 as part of a three-route number swap. The state highway's bypasses of Walkersville and Woodsboro opened in the early 1980s and mid-1990s, respectively.

== Route description ==
MD 194 begins at an intersection with MD 26 (Liberty Road) in Ceresville. The roadway continues south as MD 26, which crosses the Monocacy River on its way toward Frederick. MD 26 heads east from the intersection as a two-lane undivided road toward Libertytown. MD 194 heads north as Woodsboro Pike, which starts as a four-lane divided highway but reduces to a two-lane undivided road as the highway passes through the suburban communities of Discovery and Spring Garden, where the state highway passes the historic Woodsboro and Frederick Turnpike Company Tollhouse. While passing east of Walkersville High School, the state highway enters the town of Walkersville and the highway's old alignment, Frederick Street, splits to the north. MD 194 collects the other end of Frederick Street and passes between residential subdivisions before leaving the town at the highway's intersection with Devilbiss Bridge Road and Daysville Road. The former road heads west toward the historic Harris Farm; the latter highway leads to the 19th century Crum Road Bridge.

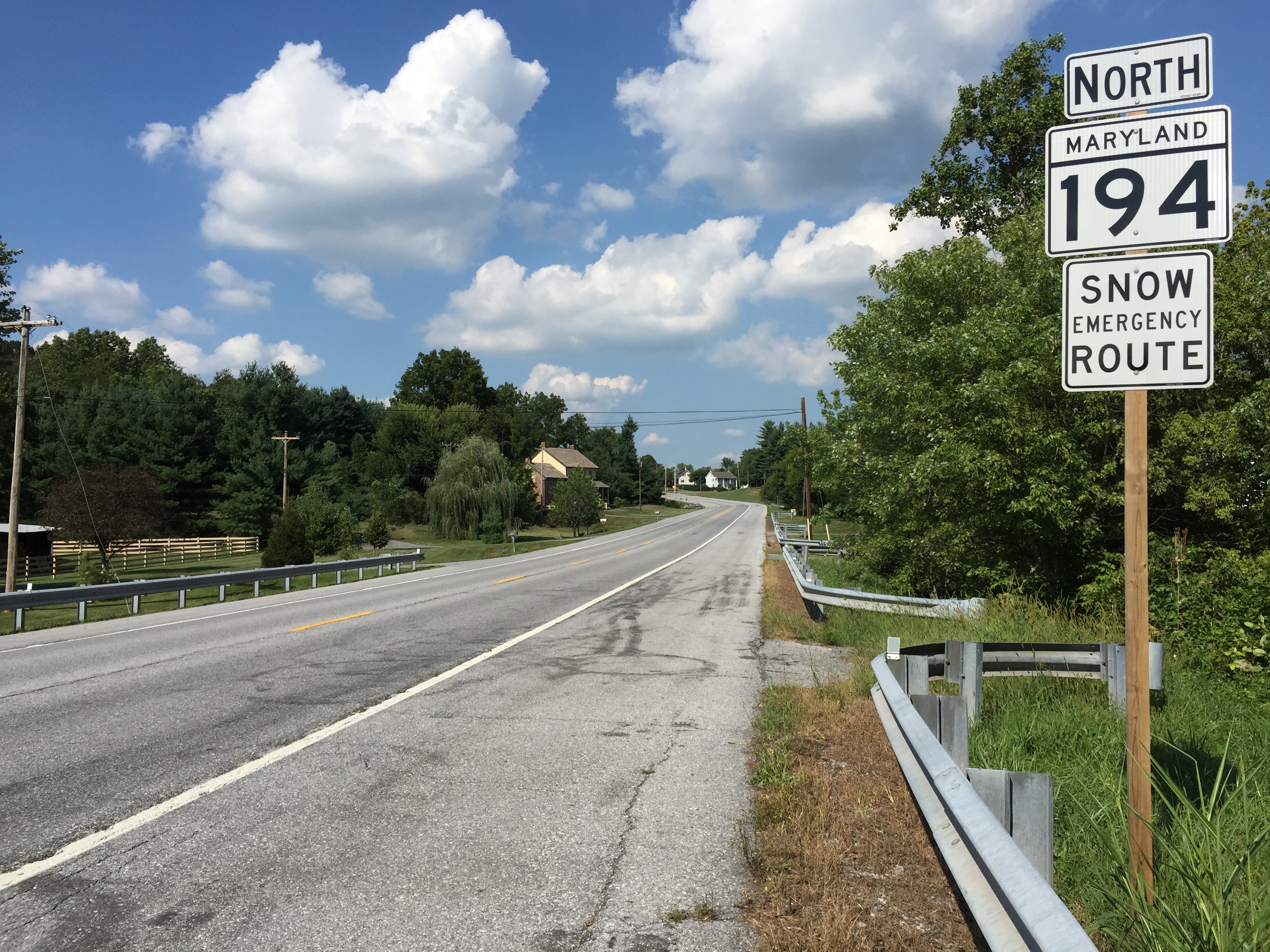
View north along MD 194 just after entering Carroll County

MD 194 parallels the Maryland Midland Railway's north–south line, Israel Creek, and Laurel Hill north to Woodsboro. At the south end of the town, Main Street, which is unsigned MD 194A, continues straight north while MD 194 veers northeast to bypass the town. A park and ride lot is located at this intersection. The state highway starts to run concurrently with MD 550 at Woodsboro Road, which heads east as MD 550 toward Libertytown. On the north side of town, MD 550 heads west as Woodsboro Creagerstown Road, which meets the northern end of Main Street before heading northwest toward Creagerstown and Thurmont. MD 194 veers northeast and has a grade crossing with the railroad track at New Midway, where the highway intersects Legore Road, which leads to the LeGore Bridge. The state highway passes through the village of Ladiesburg before crossing Little Pipe Creek, one of the tributaries of Double Pipe Creek, into Carroll County.

MD 194 continues as Francis Scott Key Highway through Keymar, where the north–south and east–west lines of the Maryland Midland Railway intersect. The state highway has a grade crossing of the east–west rail line and intersects the eastern terminus of MD 77 (Middleburg Road). In the hamlet of Bruceville, MD 194 crosses Big Pipe Creek and intersects Keysville Bruceville Road, which heads northwest toward the village of Keysville and Terra Rubra, the birthplace of Francis Scott Key. The state highway passes the historic Winemiller Family Farm and Keefer-Brubaker Farm on its way to Taneytown. MD 194, which becomes Frederick Street, crosses a branch of Piney Creek and passes the Ludwick Rudisel Tannery House. In the center of the Taneytown Historic District, the state highway intersects MD 140 (Baltimore Street), where MD 194 becomes York Street. After leaving Taneytown, the state highway becomes Francis Scott Key Highway again as it heads through farmland. MD 194 crosses Piney Creek before reaching its northern terminus at the Pennsylvania state line. The roadway continues north as PA 194 (Frederick Pike) toward the boroughs of Littlestown and Hanover.

MD 194 is a part of the National Highway System as a principal arterial from its southern terminus in Ceresville to Daysville Road in Walkersville and within the city of Taneytown.

== History ==
Maryland Route 71
- Location: Ceresville–Taneytown
- Existed: 1927–1956

In the 18th century, the corridor of what is now MD 194 was the Hanover–Frederick portion of the Monocacy Road, a migration route that connected Philadelphia and Winchester, Virginia, via York, Frederick, Boonsboro, and Williamsport. The Frederick County portion of the highway later became the path of a pair of turnpikes. The Woodsboro and Double Pipe Creek Turnpike connected the namesake town and creek; the Woodsboro and Frederick Turnpike extended from Woodsboro south to the junction with the Liberty and Frederick Turnpike in Ceresville. The two turnpikes issuing from Ceresville were connected to Frederick by the Frederick and Woodsboro Turnpike. The Woodsboro and Frederick Turnpike was the last privately maintained toll road in Maryland when it was purchased by the Maryland State Roads Commission, the predecessor to the Maryland State Highway Administration, in 1921.

What is now MD 194 was originally designated MD 71. The roads commission resurfaced the turnpikes' macadam surface from Ceresville to Little Pipe Creek to a width of 15 feet (4.6 m) by 1926. That same year, 1 mile (1.6 km) of concrete road was constructed north from MD 32 (now MD 140) in Taneytown. In 1930, construction began to complete the concrete road that MD 71 would follow through Carroll County. The state highway was completed in five sections from a short distance north of Big Pipe Creek to the Pennsylvania state line in 1933. The Carroll County section of MD 71 was dedicated as Francis Scott Key Highway in 1931. The two sections of MD 71 were separated by a county-maintained segment of highway through Keymar. This gap in the state road system remained through at least 1949.

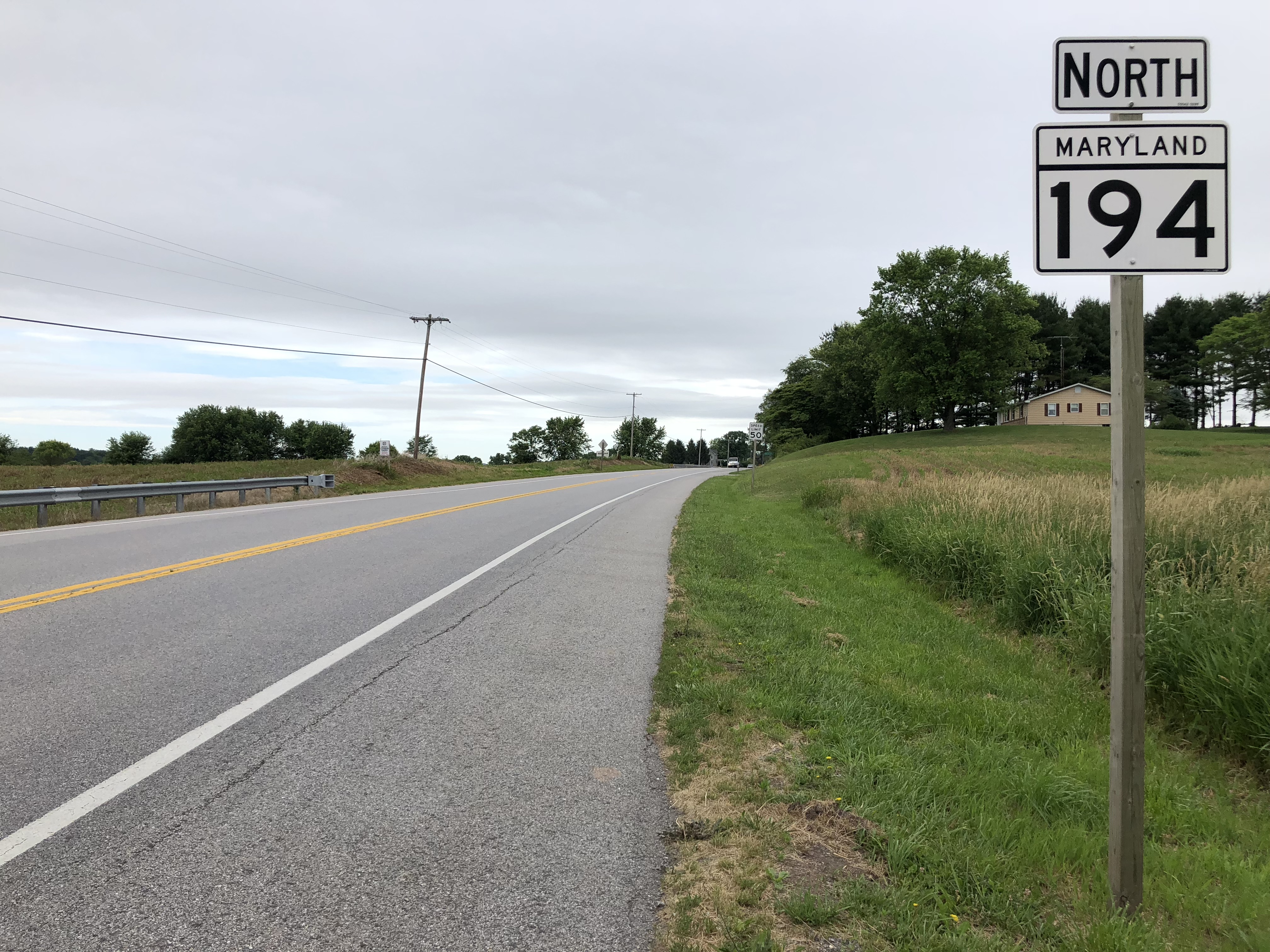
MD 194 northbound in Bruceville

MD 71 received a new steel I-beam bridge over Big Pipe Creek in 1940; this bridge was replaced in 2005. The state highway was widened through Taneytown in 1948. MD 71's present steel I-beam bridge over Little Pipe Creek at the county line was started in 1953 and completed in 1954 along with 1 mile (1.6 km) of approach roads. The state highway was reconstructed and widened from the Little Pipe Creek Bridge to New Midway in 1952 and 1953. Reconstruction of the highway commenced from New Midway to Woodsboro in 1953, from Woodsboro to Ceresville in 1956, and from Taneytown to the Pennsylvania state line in 1957.

In 1956, MD 71 was involved in a three-route number change involving highways in three different areas of the state. MD 71 was reassigned to the Blue Star Memorial Highway then under construction from Queenstown to the Delaware state line in Warwick; this designation lasted only three years before U.S. Route 301 was rerouted onto the highway in 1959. MD 71 was designated MD 194 to match the adjacent numbered highway in Pennsylvania. MD 194 had previously been assigned to Flower Avenue in Takoma Park; Flower Avenue was then designated MD 787.

MD 194's bypass of Walkersville was completed around 1981. The state highway's bypass of Woodsboro was under construction by 1995 and completed in 1997; Main Street through town was designated MD 194A. MD 550, which ran concurrently with MD 194 along Main Street, joined the latter route on the new bypass and on a bypass section of its own at the north end of town. In conjunction with the reconstruction of MD 26 as a divided highway from Market Street (then part of MD 355) in Frederick to Ceresville in 1997, the MD 26–MD 194 intersection was reconfigured so the primary movement through the intersection is between MD 26 to the west and MD 194 to the north; the southernmost portion of MD 194 became an extension of the MD 26 divided highway. This configuration was chosen because two-thirds of traffic passing through the intersection was between Frederick and Woodsboro.

== Junction list ==
County	Location	mi	km	Destinations	Notes
Frederick	Ceresville	0.00	0.00	MD 26 (Liberty Road) – Frederick, Libertytown	Southern terminus
Frederick	Woodsboro	5.65	9.09	Main Street north	Unsigned MD 194A
Frederick	Woodsboro	6.46	10.40	MD 550 south (Woodsboro Road) – Libertytown	South end of concurrency with MD 550
Frederick	Woodsboro	7.01	11.28	MD 550 north (Woodsboro Creagerstown Road) – Creagerstown, Thurmont	North end of concurrency with MD 550
Carroll	Keymar	13.33	21.45	MD 77 west (Middleburg Road) / Middleburg Road east – Thurmont, Middleburg	Eastern terminus of MD 77
Carroll	Taneytown	18.66	30.03	MD 140 (Baltimore Street) – Westminster, Emmitsburg	
Carroll		23.87	38.42	PA 194 north (Frederick Pike) – Littlestown, Hanover	Pennsylvania state line; northern terminus
1.000 mi = 1.609 km; 1.000 km = 0.621 mi: Concurrency terminus

== Auxiliary routes ==
MD 194 has four existing auxiliary routes and two that no longer exist. MD 194A and MD 194B are in Woodsboro. MD 194D and MD 194E are north of Taneytown. Former MD 194C and MD 194F were also north of Taneytown.

- MD 194A is the designation for Main Street, which runs 1.28 miles (2.06 km) between MD 194 on the south side of Woodsboro and MD 550 on the north side of Woodsboro. MD 194A is municipally maintained for 0.75 miles (1.21 km) from Mt. Hope Cemetery north to Coppermine Road.
- MD 194B is the designation for a 0.09-mile (0.14 km) section of Main Street that is now a spur south from MD 194A just north of MD 194's southern end at MD 194.
- MD 194C was the designation for an unnamed 0.03-mile (0.048 km) connector between MD 194 and former MD 853D. MD 194C and MD 853D were removed from the state highway system in 2004 due to the roadway being overgrown.
- MD 194D is the designation for an unnamed 0.02-mile (0.032 km) connector between MD 194 and MD 853E, the old alignment that parallels the northbound direction of the modern highway south of Angell Road.
- MD 194E is the designation for an unnamed 0.02-mile (0.032 km) connector between MD 194 and MD 853A, the old alignment that parallels the southbound direction of the modern highway south of the Pennsylvania state line.
- MD 194F was the designation for an unnamed 0.02-mile (0.032 km) connector between MD 194 and former MD 853D. MD 194F and MD 853D were removed from the state highway system in 2004 due to the roadway being overgrown.
