= Waveband Communications =

Corporation that manufactures two-way accessories

- Industry: Telecommunications
- Founded: 2002
- Founder: Jeff Hohman
- Headquarters: Eldersburg, Maryland, US
- Products: Two-way radio accessories
- Website: www.wvbandcoms.com

Waveband Communications, Inc is an American Corporation. that manufactures two-way accessories. Waveband Communications manufactures and sells over 500 different accessories for Motorola, Harris, Kenwood, Relm, Vertex Standard, Icom and EF Johnson radios.

== Overview ==
Waveband Communications, Inc was founded in April 2002 in Westminster, Maryland by Jeff Hohman. After spending fourteen years as the businesses founder and owner, Jeff decided to sell his business. Nicholas J. Hohman, purchased the company from his brother in 2016, moving the company headquarters to Eldersburg, Maryland. Nicholas is now the current Vice President and owner of the company. Nicholas began working for Waveband Communications in 2007 as an order fulfillment specialist before transitioning to sales in 2009. Waveband Communications, Inc currently has offices and facilities in Eldersburg, MD, Brick, NJ, and Myrtle Beach, SC.

Waveband Communications has various contracts that allow local, state, and federal government agencies the ability to purchase over 1,000 products. The company renewed its contract with GSA in 2019 to provide more than 1,000 GSA-approved products. Waveband Communications also has contracts with the Department of Information Technology in the state of Maryland and with Commonwealth of PA specifically IFB 6100039075 for Two-way radio Equipment and Services. The company also has its products published on FedMALL and with the Alabama Purchasing.

In addition to selling communications products to government end users, Waveband Communications sells to system integrators and two-way radio dealers. Waveband Communications, Inc core customers, include fire and police departments, EMS (Emergency Medical Services), casino, manufacturing, distribution personnel, health care facilities, and security officials. TSA agencies around the nation are a purchaser of the accessory products.

== Products ==
Waveband Communications manufactures over 500 two-way radio communication products. The company product offerings include two-way radio batteries, antennas, battery packs, belt clips, chargers, ear inserts, tips, and plugs, headsets, portable radio adapters, receive only earpieces and remote speaker microphones.

== Conferences ==
Waveband Communications annually attends various conferences across the United States.

- APCO International Annual Conference & Expo in Baltimore, Maryland in 2019, Denver, Colorado in 2017
- IWCE International Wireless Communications Expo in Las Vegas, Nevada in 2019, Orlando, Florida in 2018
- Police and Security Expo 2017
- IAPC International Association of Police Chiefs in Chicago, Illinois in 2019
- Pennsylvania Chiefs of Police Association 100th Conference in 2013

== First Source Wireless ==
First Source Wireless was founded in 2016 and is a division of Waveband Communications, Inc. First Source Wireless provides wireless solutions and products to law enforcement and commercial customers. They are partnered with companies such as 3M, Pulse, Harris M/A-Com, Larsen, and First Source Wireless distributes products for these brands that include headsets, PTT adapters, antennas, and mounts.
