= Rockland Farm =

Rockland Farm may refer to:

- Rockland Farm (Hagerstown, Maryland), listed on the NRHP in Maryland
- Rockland Farm (Westminster, Maryland), listed on the NRHP in Maryland
- Rockland (Leesburg, Virginia)
