= Fizzle =

Fizzle may refer to:

- Fizzle (nuclear explosion), a nuclear weapons term
- Luke's Fireworks Fizzle, a 1916 short comedy film
- Battle of Fort Fizzle, an American Civil War
- Fizzle Like A Flood, a moniker Doug Kabourek
- Fizzles, a short stories by Samuel Beckett
- Fizzle (Transformers), a fictional character, member of the Sparkabots

== See also ==
- Frizzle (disambiguation)
