= Detour, Maryland =

Unincorporated community in Maryland, United States

- Unincorporated community
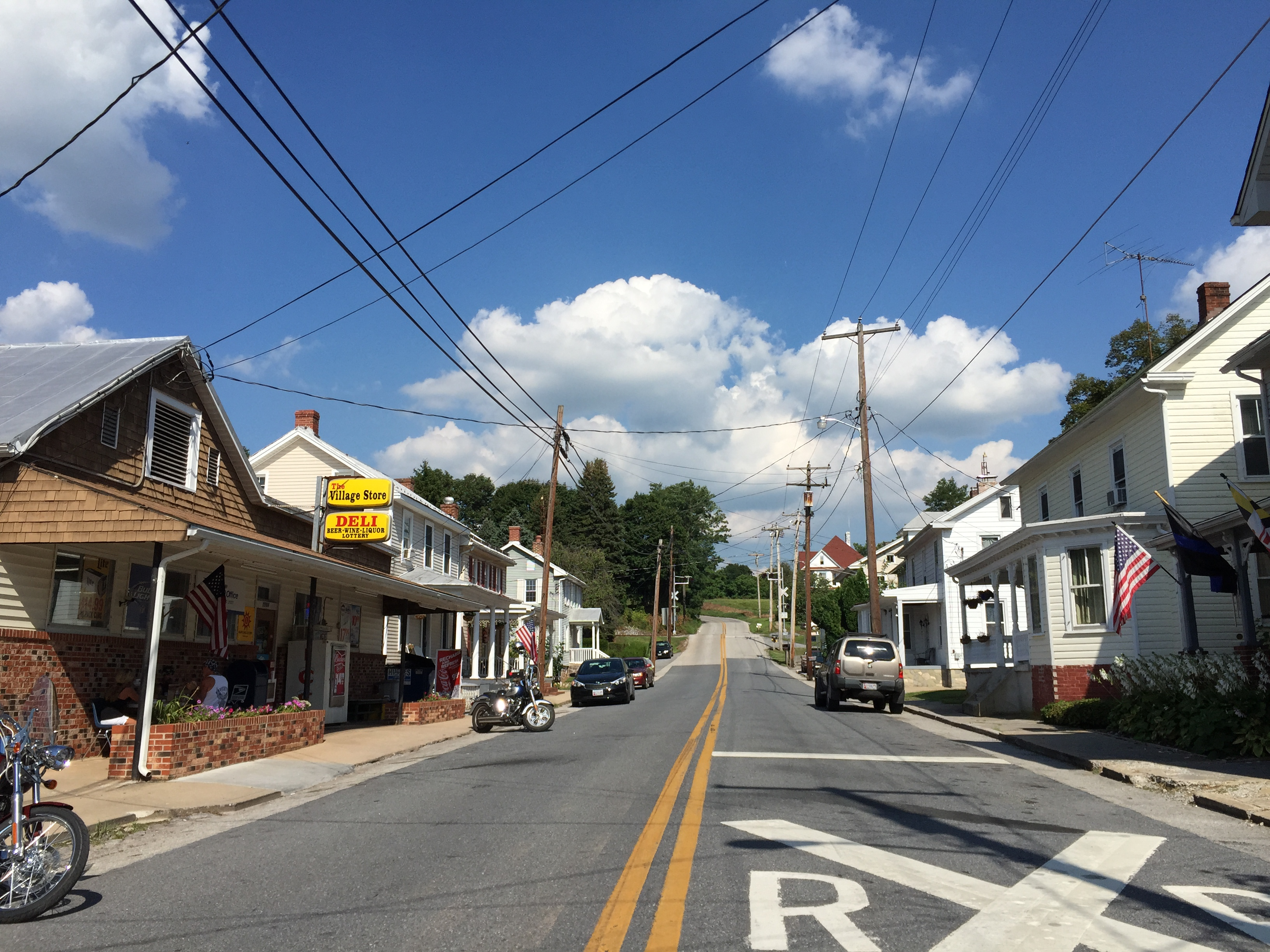
- View east along MD 77 in Detour

- Location within the state of Maryland Detour (the United States)
- Coordinates: 39°36′14″N 77°16′05″W
- Country: United States
- State: Maryland
- County: Carroll
- Time zone: UTC-5 (Eastern (EST))
  - Summer (DST): UTC-4 (EDT)

Detour is an unincorporated community in Carroll County, Maryland, United States.

== History ==
A post office called Detour was established in 1905, and remained in operation until 1993. According to tradition, the indirect route of the railroad extending to the site accounts for the name.

William and Catherine Biggs Farm was listed on the National Register of Historic Places in 2001.

== Location ==
Detour is located in western Carroll County and to the west of Detour is the Frederick County Line (Double Pipe Creek), to the east of Detour is Keymar, to the north of Detour is another unincorporated community called Keysville, and to the south of Detour is Ladiesburg, another unincorporated community. Detour has a Methodist Protestant Church.
