= Arter =

Arter is a surname. Notable people with the surname include:

- Harry Arter (born 1989), professional footballer
- Jared Maurice Arter, American former slave
- Kingsley Arter Taft (1903–1970), American politician
- Philip and Uriah Arter, after whom Philip and Uriah Arter Farm is named
- Robert Arter (born 1929), recipient of the Purple Heart medal
- Solomon Arter, after whom Solomon Arter House is named
- Charlotte Arter (born 1991), Welsh runner

== See also ==
- Eye dialect spelling of "after"
- Arter Island, see Kuş Island
- Arter & Hadden, former Cleveland, Ohio, US law firm
- Arter (art center), an art space in Istanbul
