= Artery (disambiguation) =

An artery is a blood vessel in the body that carries blood away from the heart.

Artery may also refer to:

- Artery (band), a post-punk band from Sheffield, England, formed in 1978
- Artery (character), a character in the Demonata book series by Darren Shan
- Arterial road, moderate or high-capacity road which is just below a highway level of service
  - Central Artery, a freeway in Boston, Massachusetts
- Arteria, a synonym for a genus of mantises, Aethalochroa

== See also ==
- Arter
