= Lineboro Historic District =

- U.S. National Register of Historic Places
- U.S. Historic district
- Location within Maryland Location within the United States
- Location: Main St., Church to Mill Sts., Lineboro, Maryland
- Coordinates: 39°43′1″N 76°50′48″W
- Area: 46 acres (19 ha)
- Built: 1877
- Architectural style: Bungalow/craftsman, Late Gothic Revival, foursquare
- NRHP reference No.: 96001350
- Added to NRHP: November 15, 1996

Lineboro Historic District is a national historic district in Lineboro, Carroll County, Maryland, United States. The district comprises most of the village of Lineboro, a small linear settlement located just south of the Mason–Dixon line in northeastern Carroll County. It was listed on the National Register of Historic Places on November 15, 1996.

== Description ==
The Lineboro Historic District covers approximately 46 acres and includes most of the village along Main Street, Church Street, and Mill Street. The village is laid out primarily along Main Street, which runs southwest to northeast through the community. Houses predominate within the district, along with agricultural outbuildings, stores, a one-room school, a fire hall, a former hotel, a feed mill, and the 1908 cruciform-plan Gothic Revival Lazarus Union Church.

The district includes a variety of nineteenth- and early twentieth-century building types. Common house forms include three-bay vernacular dwellings with center entrances, larger five-bay center-entrance houses, Pennsylvania farmhouse-plan houses, foursquares, and bungalows. Several houses are built into partially excavated banks, and domestic outbuildings such as summer kitchens and smokehouses also contribute to the district's character.

Several properties were farms before Lineboro developed as a village and continued to function as farms after the settlement grew around them. These properties retain agricultural outbuildings, including bank barns. The district contains 83 resources, of which 70, or 84 percent, contribute to its historic significance.

== History and significance ==
Lineboro developed as a small crossroads community in northeastern Carroll County. Through the second and third quarters of the nineteenth century, it remained a small settlement with a church, store, and inn near what is now the western end of the village.

Growth accelerated after the arrival of the Baltimore and Hanover Railroad in 1877. A feed mill and store were constructed next to the railroad tracks at the eastern end of the village, and Lineboro became a rural transportation and commercial center. Residential and commercial development gradually filled in along Main Street between the older western end of the village and the railroad-related development to the east.

The district is significant as an example of the linear "Pennsylvania" town plan characteristic of nineteenth-century villages in Maryland's Piedmont region. The Maryland Historical Trust describes Lineboro as distinctive among the linear towns of northeastern Carroll County because of its high degree of integrity and its representation of domestic, commercial, religious, agricultural, and industrial building forms from approximately 1820 to 1930.

Building activity in Lineboro slowed during the Great Depression and did not resume until after World War II.

== See also ==
- National Register of Historic Places listings in Carroll County, Maryland
