= Jacob Koons Farm =

- U.S. National Register of Historic Places
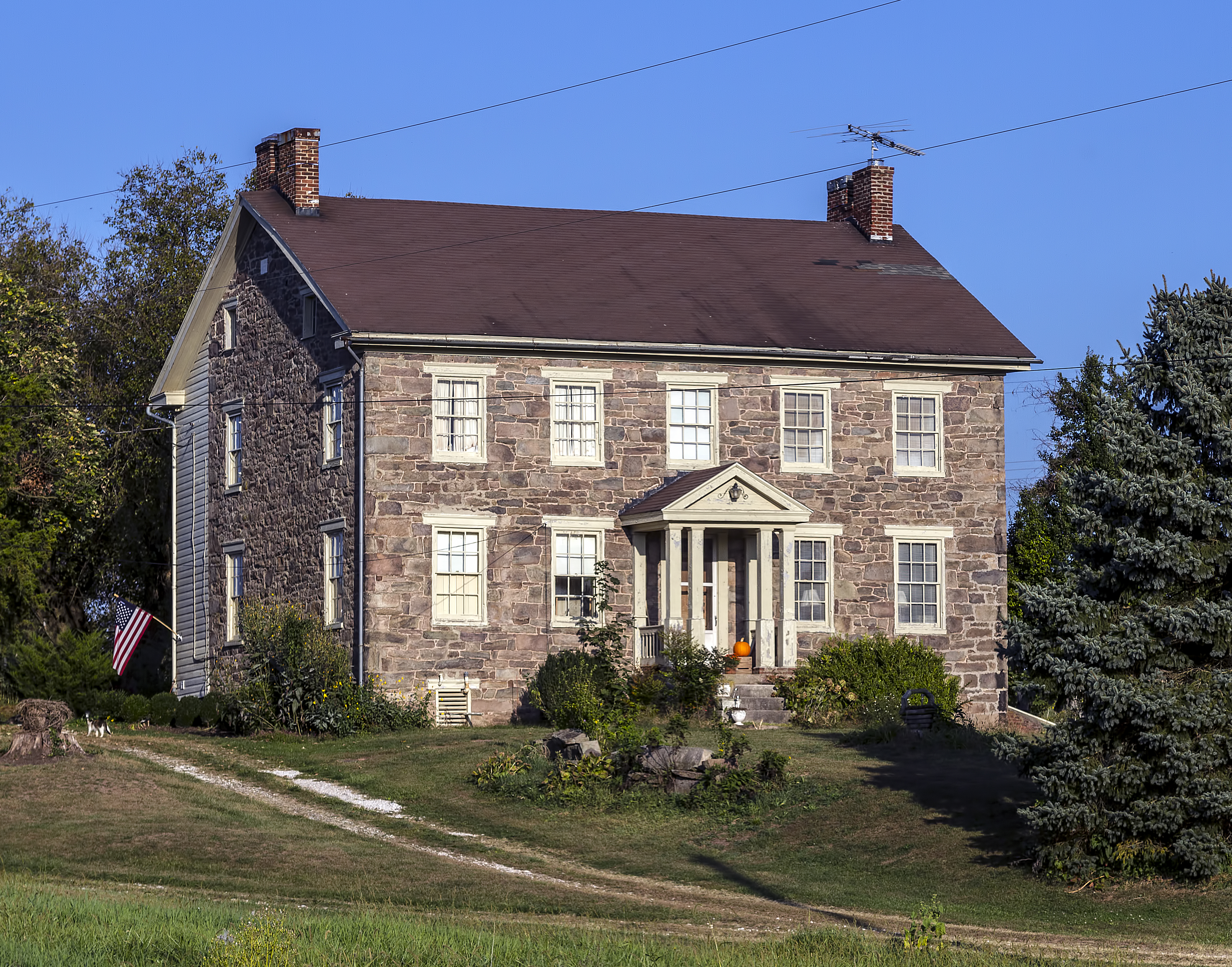

- Location within Maryland Location within the United States
- Location: 1151 Otterdale Mill Road, Taneytown, Maryland
- Coordinates: 39°36′37″N 77°10′12″W
- Area: 4.9 acres (2.0 ha)
- Built: 1869
- NRHP reference No.: 11000306
- Added to NRHP: May 25, 2011

The Jacob Koons Farm is a historic farmstead at 1151 Otterdale Mill Road in rural Carroll County, Maryland, near Taneytown. The main farmhouse, a two-story rubble stone construction, was built in 1869. The property also includes several 19th-century outbuildings, including a wood-frame summer kitchen, a stone smokehouse, and a wooden barn.

The farm was listed on the National Register of Historic Places in 2011.

== See also ==
- National Register of Historic Places listings in Carroll County, Maryland
