= Frisell =

Frisell is a surname. Notable people with the surname include:

- Bill Frisell (born 1951), American guitarist and composer
- Erik Frisell (1889–1944), Swedish track and field athlete who competed in the 1912 Summer Olympics
- Fraser Frisell (1774–1846), British essayist
- Hjalmar Frisell (1880–1967), Swedish sports shooter who competed in the 1912 Summer Olympics
