= Houcksville, Maryland =

Unincorporated community in Maryland, U.S.

Coordinates: 39°34′16″N 76°52′48″W

Houcksville is an unincorporated community in Carroll County, Maryland, United States. The Isaac Hoffman House was listed on the National Register of Historic Places in 1985.
