= Christopher Erb House =

Historic house in Maryland, United States

- U.S. National Register of Historic Places
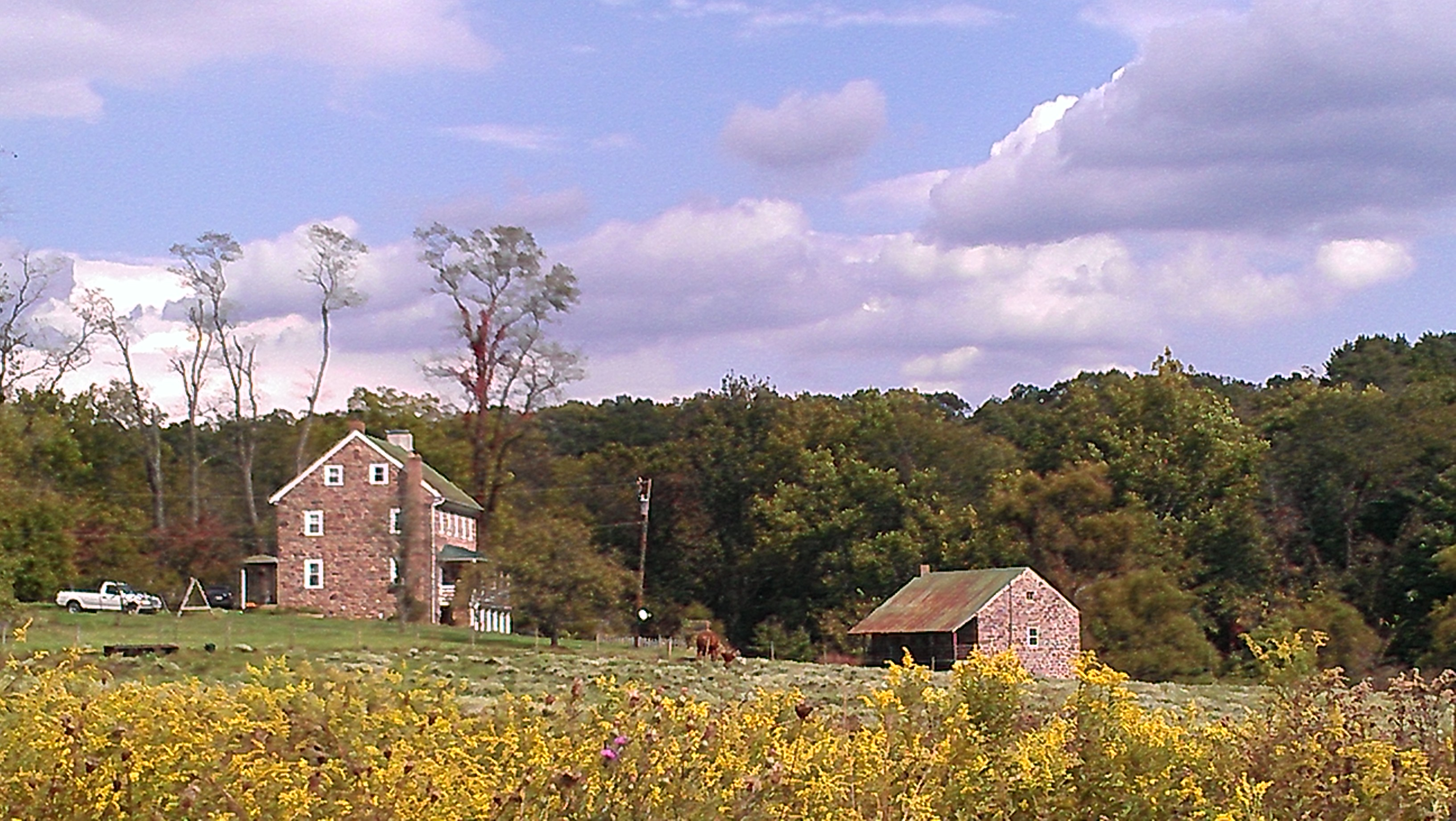

- Location within Maryland Location within the United States
- Location: 3333 Flickinger Road, Silver Run, Maryland
- Coordinates: 39°39′52″N 77°5′6″W
- Area: 37.8 acres (15.3 ha)
- Built: 1799
- Built by: Erb, Christopher
- Architectural style: Pennsylvania German
- NRHP reference No.: 85001269
- Added to NRHP: June 19, 1985

The Christopher Erb House is a stone house finished in 1799. It stands in Silver Run under a Westminster, MD zip code (21158). It is on a 38-acre (15 ha) property, split in two, and borders on Big Pipe Creek. The house has experienced two small fires, multiple hits from Black Locust trees in Hurricane Isabel, and detrimental building practices inside and outside the stone walls. The house is historically significant as an example of Pennsylvania German architecture and it reflects the influence of Pennsylvania Germans in Carroll County.

It was listed on the National Register of Historic Places in 1985.

The main house, finished in 1799 as evident by the date stone in the western gable, was constructed as a two family German style house. However, the exterior is in the Georgian style, with the southern elevation symmetrical and minimal decorative elements at the doorway. The southern elevation, the original front of the building, has more cut stone, although most of the house is constructed of field stone. Further down the slope of the knoll the main house sits on is a two-story spring house, the original house on the property. This is constructed as a traditional German colonial house, with a spring room and kitchen room on the bottom level. This house is listed in the 1760 tax records, and is assumed to be constructed between 1755 and 1760.
