= William and Catherine Biggs Farm =

- U.S. National Register of Historic Places
- Location within Maryland Location within the United States
- Location: 8212 Sixes Bridge Rd., Detour, Maryland
- Coordinates: 39°37′41.4″N 77°17′14.6″W
- Area: 17 acres (6.9 ha)
- Built: 1793
- Architectural style: Art Deco
- NRHP reference No.: 01001197
- Added to NRHP: November 2, 2001

The William and Catherine Biggs Farm is a historic home and farm complex located at Detour, Carroll County, Maryland, United States. The complex consists of a stone house, a stone outbuilding / summer kitchen, a frame bank barn, and an early-20th-century concrete block barn, dairy building, and silo. The house is a two-story, five-by-two-bay structure with a three-by-two-bay, two-story rear wing. It is built primarily of rubble stone.

The William and Catherine Biggs Farm was listed on the National Register of Historic Places in 2001.
