= Union Mills, Maryland =

Unincorporated community in Carroll County, Maryland, United States

Coordinates: 39°40′11″N 77°01′29″W

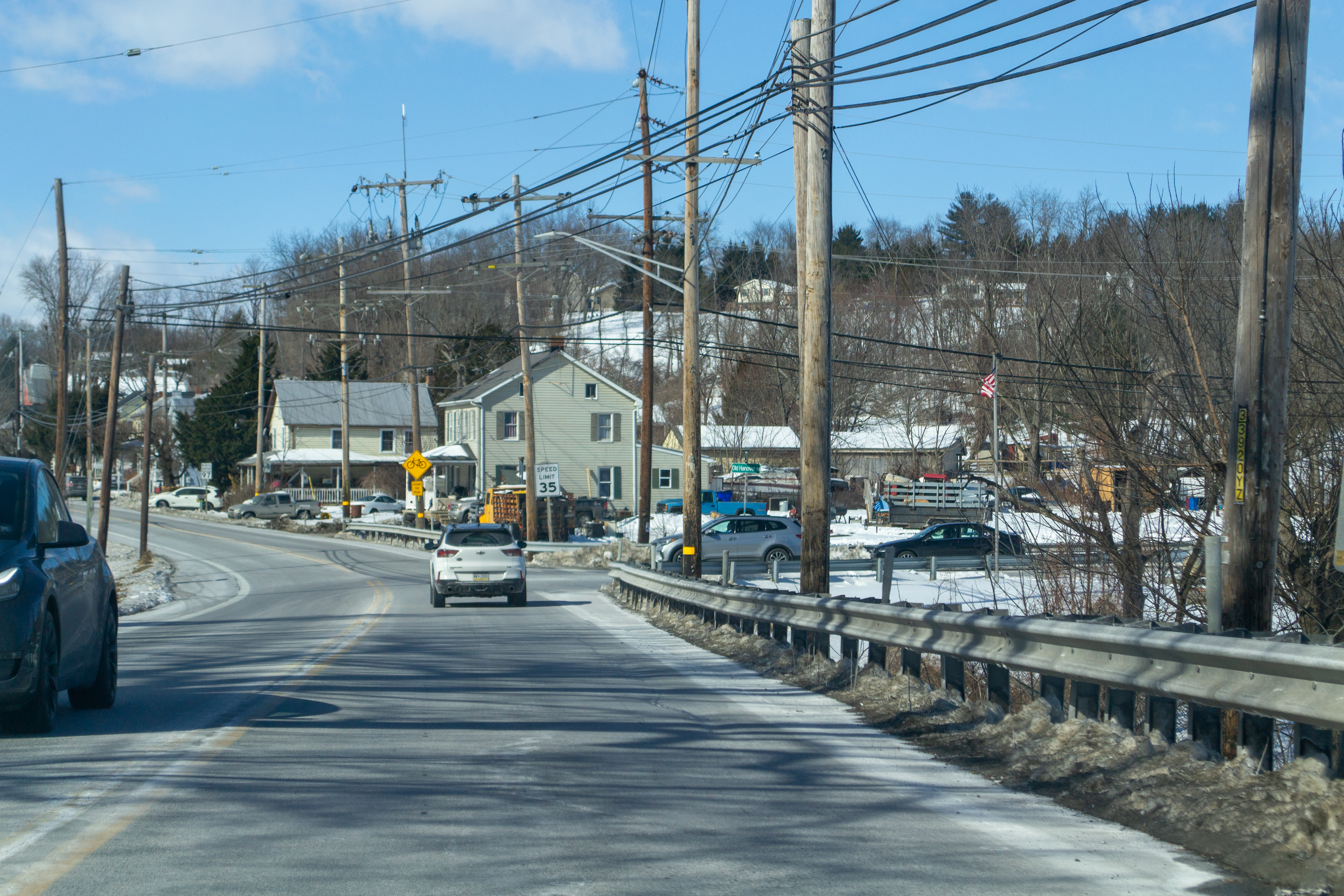
Union Mills, MD

Union Mills is an unincorporated community in Carroll County, Maryland, United States. The community is home to the Union Mills Homestead Historic District, added to the National Register of Historic Places in 1971. The Solomon Arter House was listed in 1987 and the Philip and Uriah Arter Farm in 2006.

Since the 1970s, Carroll County commissioners have tried to build a dam or reservoir centered nearby, defeated in the 1970s and revived in the 2000s as a proposed Union Mills Reservoir.

Union Mills plays a central role in Gettysburg: A Novel of the Civil War, a 2003 alternate history novel written by Newt Gingrich and William R. Forstchen.
