= Wesley Chapel Methodist Episcopal Church (Eldersburg, Maryland) =

Historic church in Maryland, United States

- U.S. National Register of Historic Places
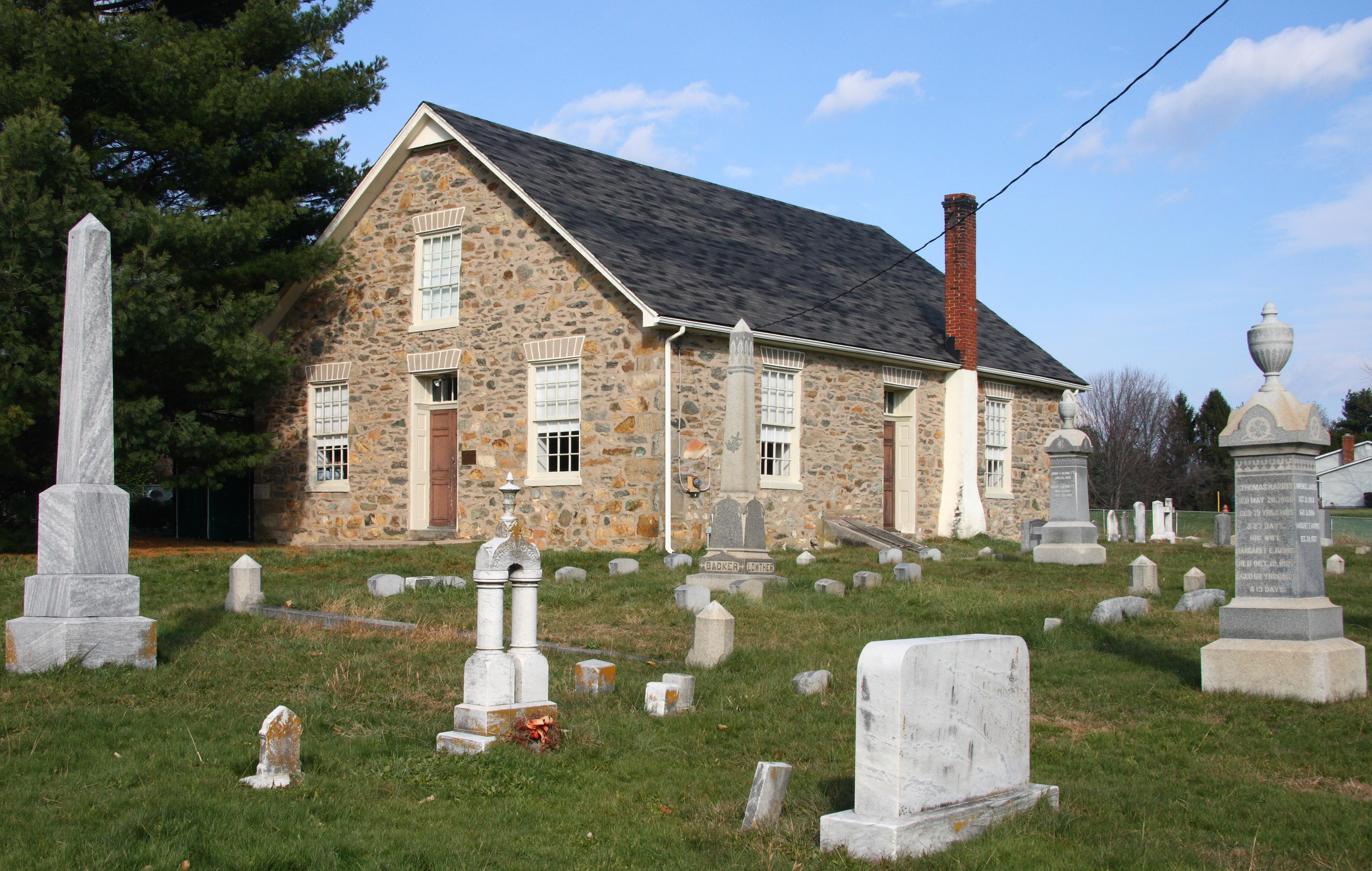

- Location within Maryland Location within the United States
- Location: Liberty Road (MD 26), Eldersburg, Maryland
- Coordinates: 39°24′26″N 76°57′45″W
- Area: 2 acres (0.81 ha)
- Built: 1821
- Built by: Elder, John
- NRHP reference No.: 84001593
- Added to NRHP: March 22, 1984

The Wesley Chapel Methodist Episcopal Church in Eldersburg, Maryland is a characteristic small church of the period (built ~1822), with uncoursed stone rubble construction and a simple plan. The interior is a single barrel-vaulted room. It was erected to serve one of the earliest Methodist congregations in Carroll County, and hence in the United States, as Carroll County was a birthplace of Methodism in America.

It was listed on the National Register of Historic Places in 1984.
