= Slagle-Byers House =

Historic house in Maryland, United States

- U.S. National Register of Historic Places
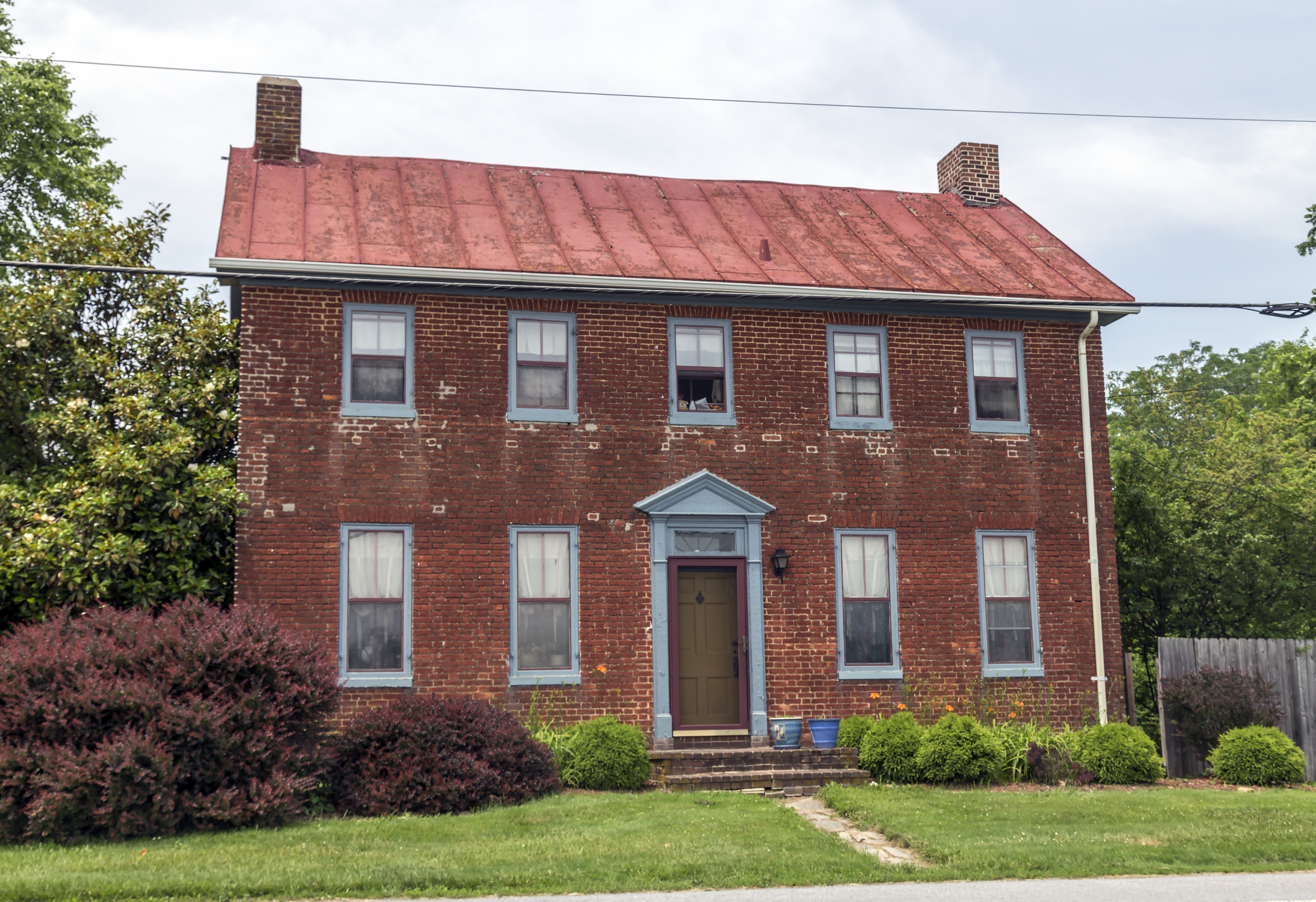

- Location within Maryland Location within the United States
- Location: 1624 Littlestown Pike (MD 197), Westminster, Maryland
- Coordinates: 39°37′11.68″N 76°59′51.05″W
- Area: 1.2 acres (0.49 ha)
- Built: 1819
- NRHP reference No.: 07000566
- Added to NRHP: June 21, 2007

Slagle-Byers House is a historic home located at Westminster, Carroll County, Maryland. It is a two-story gable-roofed Flemish bond brick structure with a two-story rear wing. It was constructed about 1819.

It was listed on the National Register of Historic Places in 2007.
