= Cover's Tannery =

- U.S. National Register of Historic Places
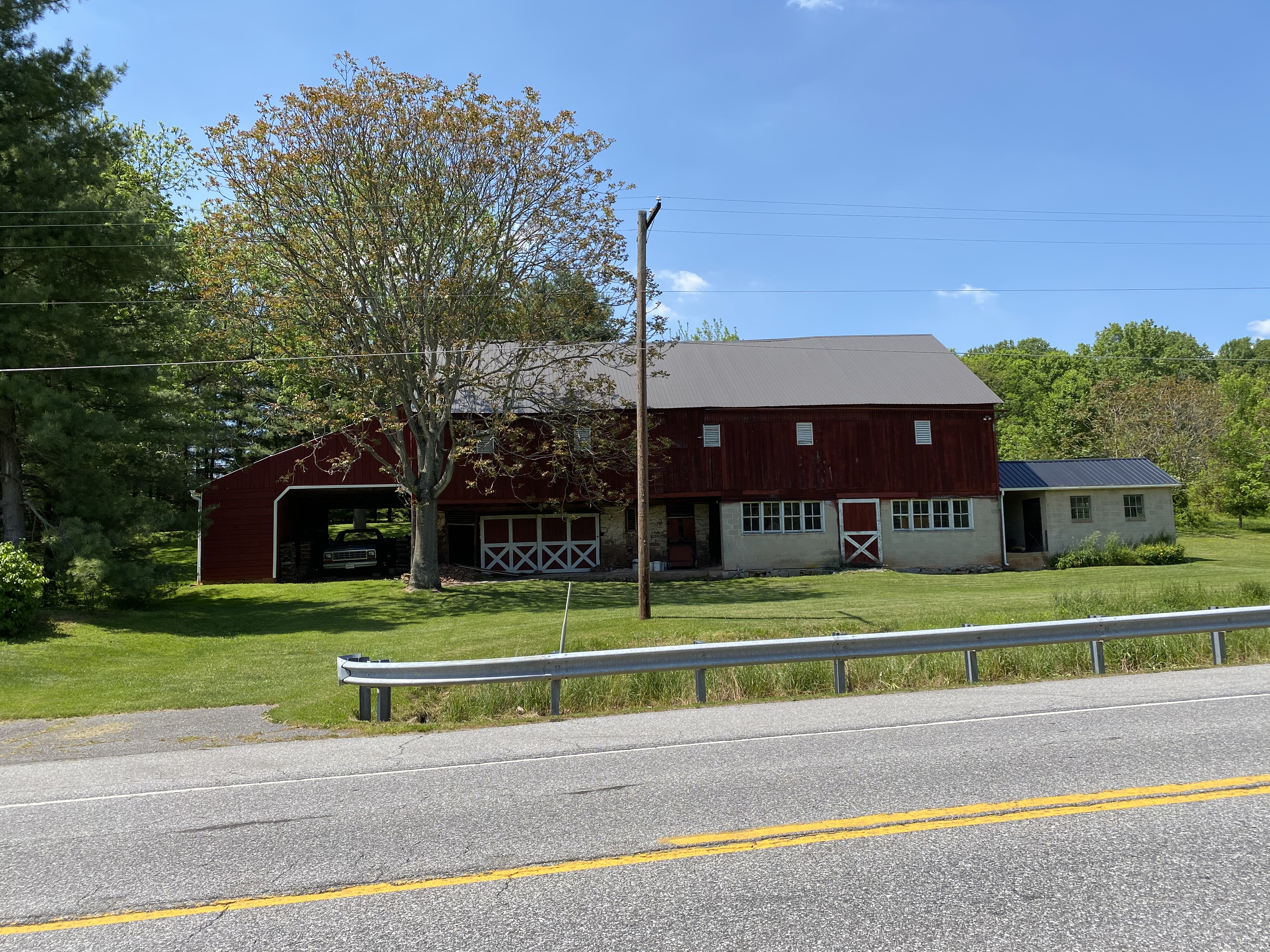
- Cover's Tannery Barn, May 2020

- Location within Maryland Location within the United States
- Location: 626 Francis Scott Key Highway (MD 194), Keymar, Maryland
- Coordinates: 39°35′33″N 77°14′25″W
- Built: ca. 1790-1830
- Architectural style: Vernacular
- NRHP reference No.: 100004486
- Added to NRHP: September 27, 2019

Cover's Tannery is a historic tannery complex located at Keymar, Carroll County, Maryland. The complex consists of a house and bank barn built between 1790 and 1830. Also on the property is a frame summer kitchen. The house is a two-story log structure with five bays on the first story and four on the second story. The building's reflect the Germanic building traditions in their vernacular architecture.

It was listed on the National Register of Historic Places in 2019.
