= Lineboro, Maryland =

Unincorporated community in Maryland, United States

- Unincorporated community
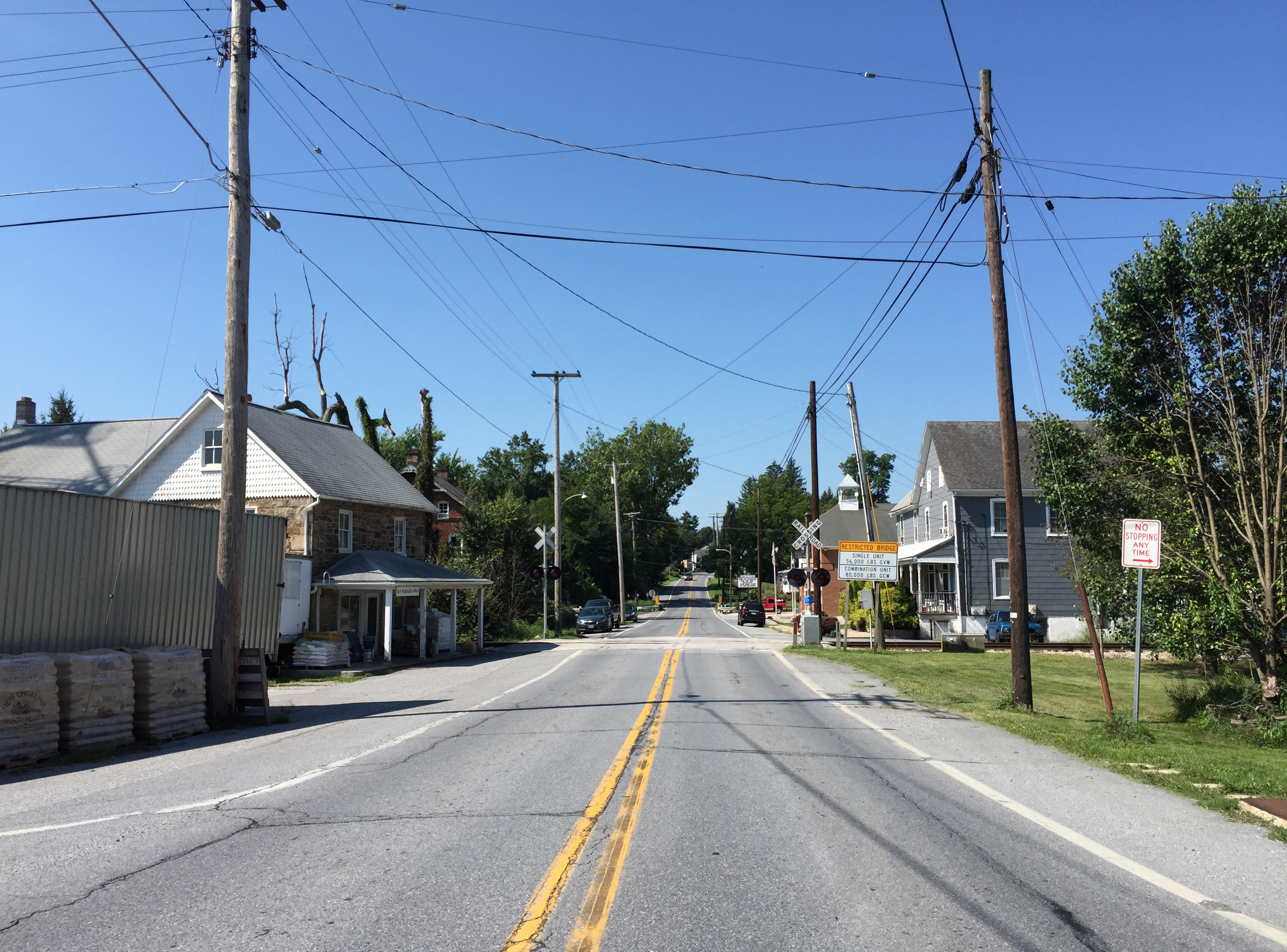
- Looking south on Main Street in Lineboro, Maryland

- Location within Maryland Location within the United States
- Coordinates: 39°43′9.84″N 76°50′41.03″W
- Country: United States
- State: Maryland
- County: Carroll
- Elevation: 690 ft (210 m)
- Time zone: UTC-5 (Eastern (EST))
  - Summer (DST): UTC-4 (EDT)
- ZIP code: 21088
- Area codes: 410,443,667

Lineboro is an unincorporated community located in northeastern Carroll County, Maryland, United States. The community was named for its location near the Mason–Dixon line.

== History ==
Much of the town was added to the National Register of Historic Places as the Lineboro Historic District in 1996. According to Harvey G. Schlichter, Two Centuries of Grace and Growth in Manchester, 1760-1960, the land on which Lineboro later was settled was called "Plymouth," and was granted in 1745 to Verick Whissler. The first house in town was built by Conrad Kerlinger in 1820. The application submitted to the National Register of Historic places details that by 1886 the town eight dwellings, all built after 1877.

== See also ==
- Lineboro Historic District
