= Fraser Frisell =

Fraser Frisell (1774–1846), was a friend of Chateaubriand and Joubert.

Frisell, of British, probably Scottish parentage, was educated at the University of Glasgow. He was in France, for the purpose of finishing his education, in 1793, when, in pursuance of the decree of the Convention for the arrest of strangers, he was thrown into prison at Dijon, where he remained for fifteen months. There he made the acquaintance of Mme. de Guitaut, whose hospitality he accepted until his return to England, after the signature of the Treaty of Amiens. He was again in France on the renewal of the war in 1803, and was again imprisoned, but not for long. Frisell now took up his residence at Paris, where he lived during the remainder of his life, spending, however, a portion of each year in travel, and in visits to Mme. de Guitaut and her husband at Époisses.

He became the intimate friend of Chateaubriand, Joubert, Fontanes, and their circle. In memory of Frisell's daughter Élisa (or Louisa), who died at Passy in 1832 aged 17, Chateaubriand, while in prison on charge of participation in the Duchesse de Berry's attempt to overthrow the Orléanist régime, composed the touching stanzas, Jeune Fille et Jeune Fleur, and portions of the affectionate correspondence between Frisell and Joubert have been preserved. He died while on a visit to England in February 1846.

Frisell was a man of considerable accomplishments. Chateaubriand called him "le Gréco-Anglais", and Count Marcellus, while styling him fantastic, testifies to his culture and knowledge. His manner is described as reserved and his conversation sarcastic, with an affectation of indifference which annoyed his friends, particularly Mme. de Chateaubriand; but he was generally beloved. The only work that he is known to have written is an Étude sur la Constitution de l'Angleterre, avec des remarques sur l'ancienne Constitution de la France, 1820.
