= Moses Brown House =

Historic house in Maryland, United States

- U.S. National Register of Historic Places
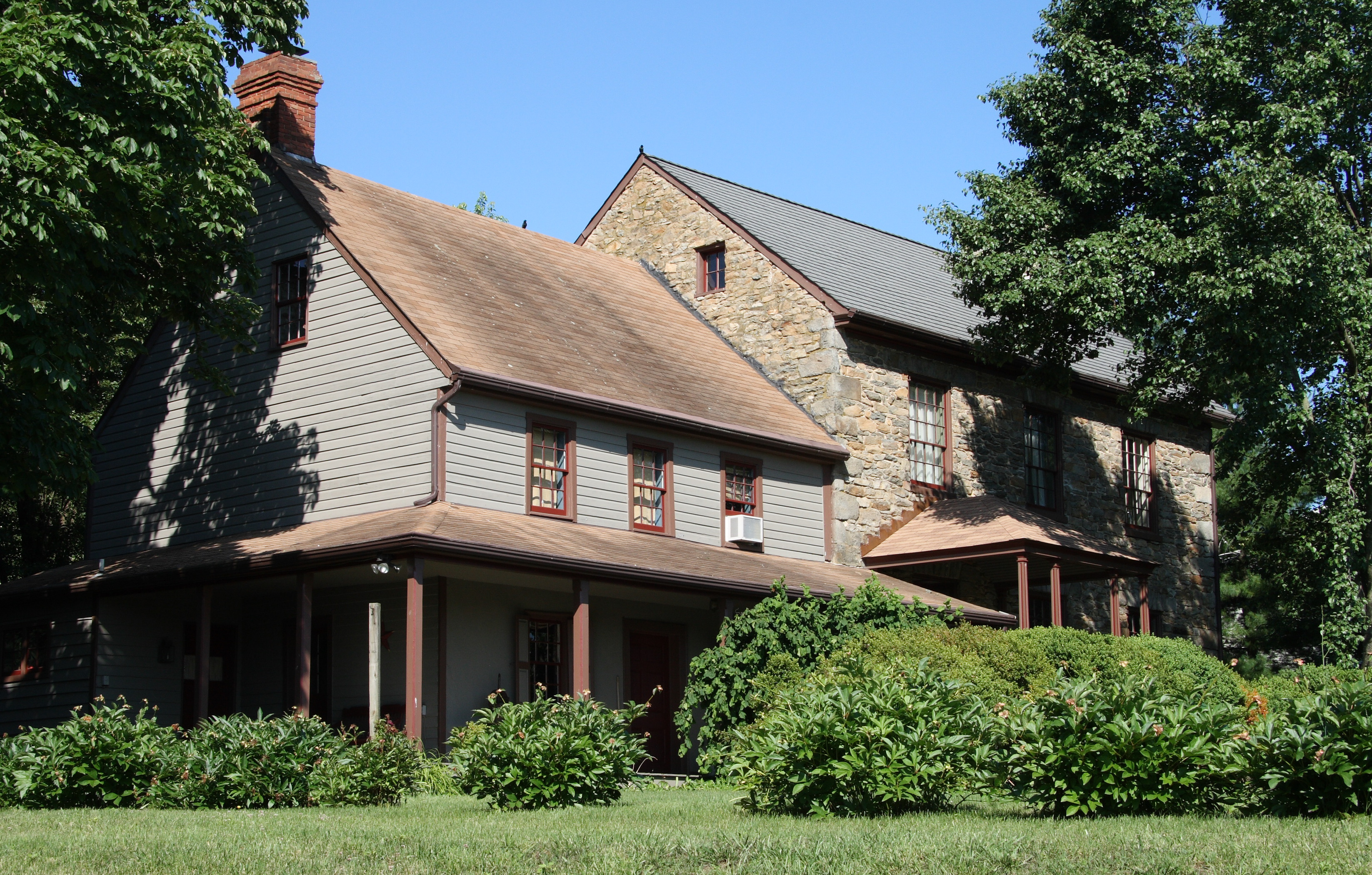

- Location within Maryland Location within the United States
- Location: 6736 Ridge Road, Eldersburg, Maryland
- Coordinates: 39°23′18″N 76°55′36″W
- Area: less than one acre
- Built: 1785
- Built by: Brown, Moses
- NRHP reference No.: 80001800
- Added to NRHP: December 11, 1980

The original log section of the Moses Brown House was built about 1785, with a stone addition dating to about 1814. The house illustrates a transition in construction practice and style, with the much larger, later addition reflecting a higher level of detail and sophistication.

The Moses Brown House listed on the National Register of Historic Places in 1977.
