= Silver Run, Carroll County, Maryland =

Unincorporated community in Maryland, U.S.

Coordinates: 39°40′58″N 77°02′39″W

Silver Run is an unincorporated community in Carroll County, Maryland, United States. The Christopher Erb House was listed on the National Register of Historic Places in 1985.
