= Jacob F. Shaffer Farm =

- U.S. National Register of Historic Places
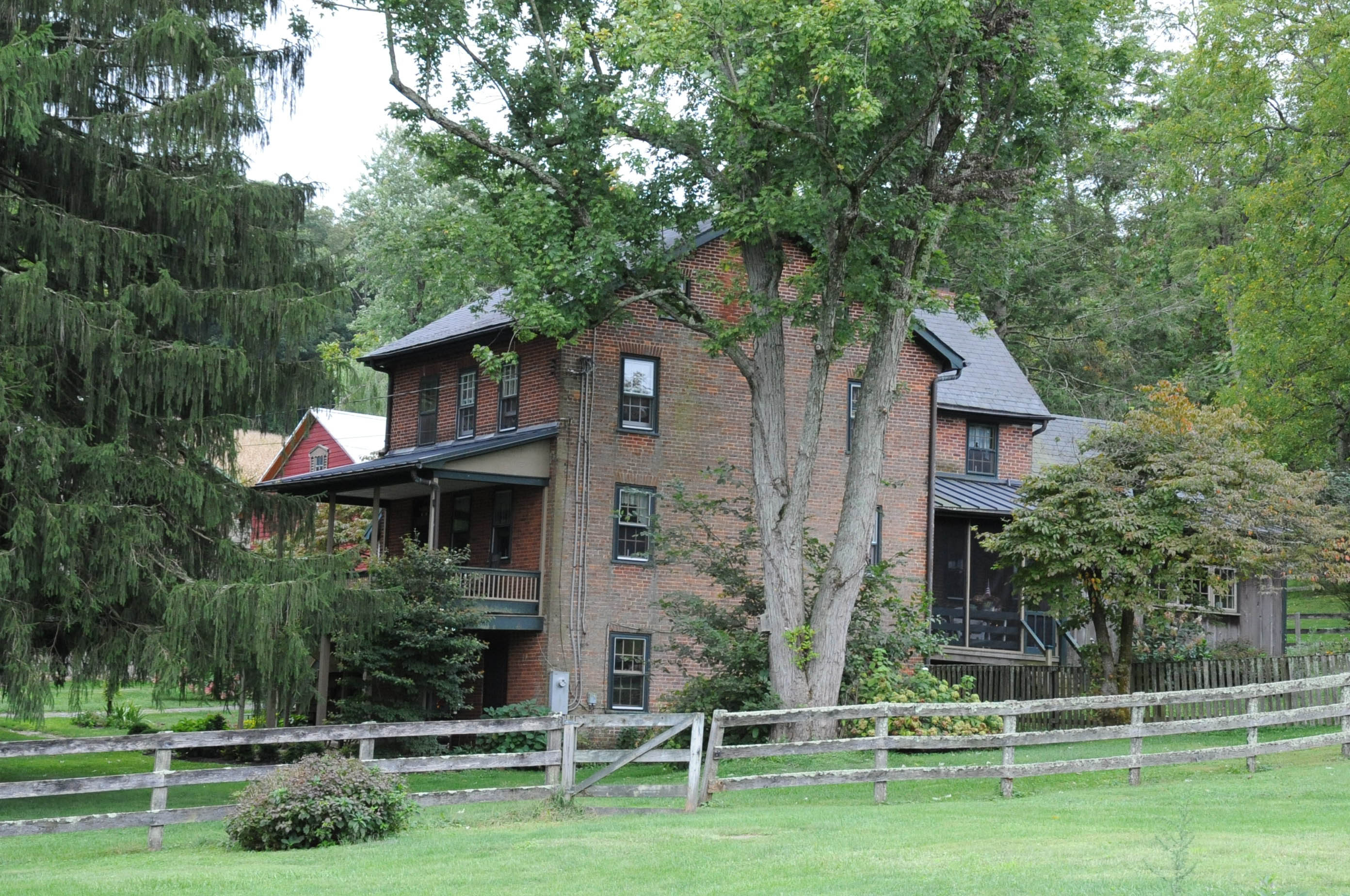

- Location within Maryland Location within the United States
- Location: 4758 Schalk Road No. 1, Millers, Maryland
- Coordinates: 39°42′2″N 76°49′34.4″W
- Area: 25.4 acres (10.3 ha)
- Built: 1854
- Built by: Shaffer, Jacob F.
- Architectural style: Federal, Greek Revival
- NRHP reference No.: 98001259
- Added to NRHP: October 22, 1998

Jacob F. Shaffer Farm is a historic home and farm complex located at Millers, Carroll County, Maryland. The complex consists of a brick house built in 1854, a rare stone bank barn, a frame summer kitchen, and a frame corn crib. The house is a two-story, three-bay wide, banked Federal / Greek Revival style brick structure with Flemish bond on the east-facing facade.

It was listed on the National Register of Historic Places in 1998.
