= Frizzell Hotsprings =

Thermal spring in British Columbia, Canada

Frizzell Hotsprings is a hot spring on the south bank of the Skeena River, northeast of Hotspring Point, near Prince Rupert, British Columbia, Canada.

== Description ==
The hot spring water emerges from a series of vents, and forms a hot creek that flows to the river mudflats. There is a deep soaking tub large enough to fit several people. The water temperature in the soaking pool is 41 °C/106 °F. There is a small cabin and a hut near the soaking pool.

This is private property and not to be used by the public. Trespassing is not allowed.

== History ==
In the early 20th century there was a vibrant cannery town nearby, and Japanese fishermen would frequent the hot springs. In the 1920s, George Frizzell bought the property where the springs are located, and he built a bathhouse there.

The hot springs are privately owned and visiting without owner permission is an actionable trespass.

== See also ==
- List of hot springs
