= Stoner–Saum Farm =

- U.S. National Register of Historic Places
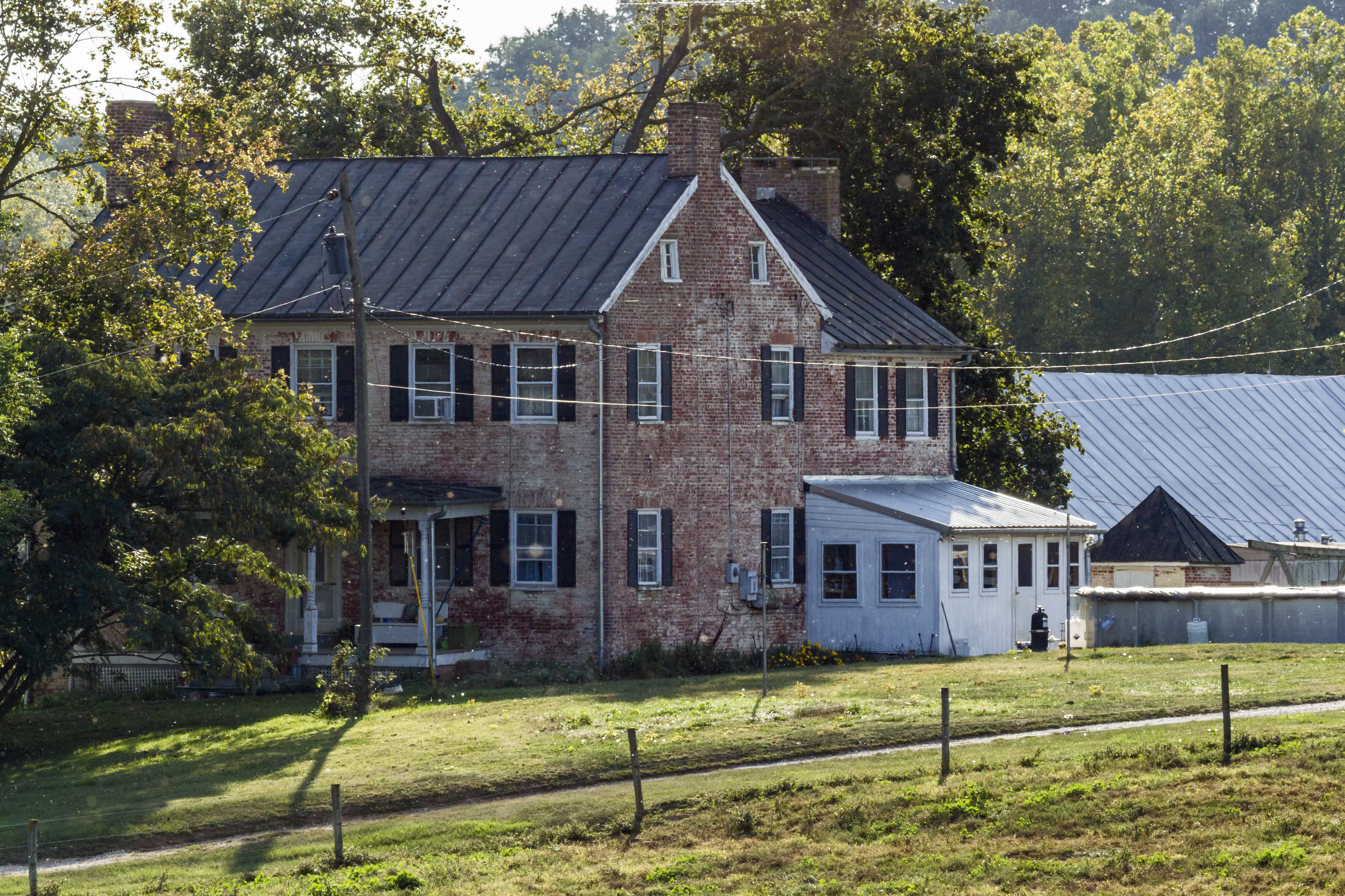

- Location within Maryland Location within the United States
- Location: 1500 McKinstrys Mill Road, Union Bridge, Maryland
- Coordinates: 39°32′5″N 77°9′54″W
- Area: 70 acres (28 ha)
- Built: 1814
- Architectural style: Federal
- NRHP reference No.: 96001415
- Added to NRHP: December 6, 1996

The Stoner–Saum Farm is a historic home and farm complex located at Union Bridge, Carroll County, Maryland, United States. The complex consists of a brick house, a frame bank barn, a brick smokehouse, a stone ice house and summer kitchen, a stone wagon shed, and several other frame farm outbuildings. The house is a two-story, five-bay by two-bay structure with a rubble stone foundation.

The Stoner–Saum Farm was listed on the National Register of Historic Places in 1996.
