= Isaac Hoffman House =

Historic house in Maryland, United States

- U.S. National Register of Historic Places
- Location within Maryland Location within the United States
- Location: 364 Shamer Lane, Houcksville, Maryland
- Coordinates: 39°34′45.1″N 76°53′19″W
- Area: 1 acre (0.40 ha)
- Built: 1850
- Architectural style: Pennsylvania German
- NRHP reference No.: 85001612
- Added to NRHP: July 25, 1985

Isaac Hoffman House is a historic home located at Houcksville, Carroll County, Maryland, United States. It was built about 1850 and is a two-story gable-roofed stuccoed stone farm house with a four bay façade with a one-story full length porch. Also on the property is a stone springhouse. The house is unusual for retaining elements of Pennsylvania German architecture at such a late date.

The Isaac Hoffman House was listed on the National Register of Historic Places in 1985.
