= Millers, Maryland =

Unincorporated community in Maryland, U.S.

Coordinates: 39°40′16″N 76°51′04″W

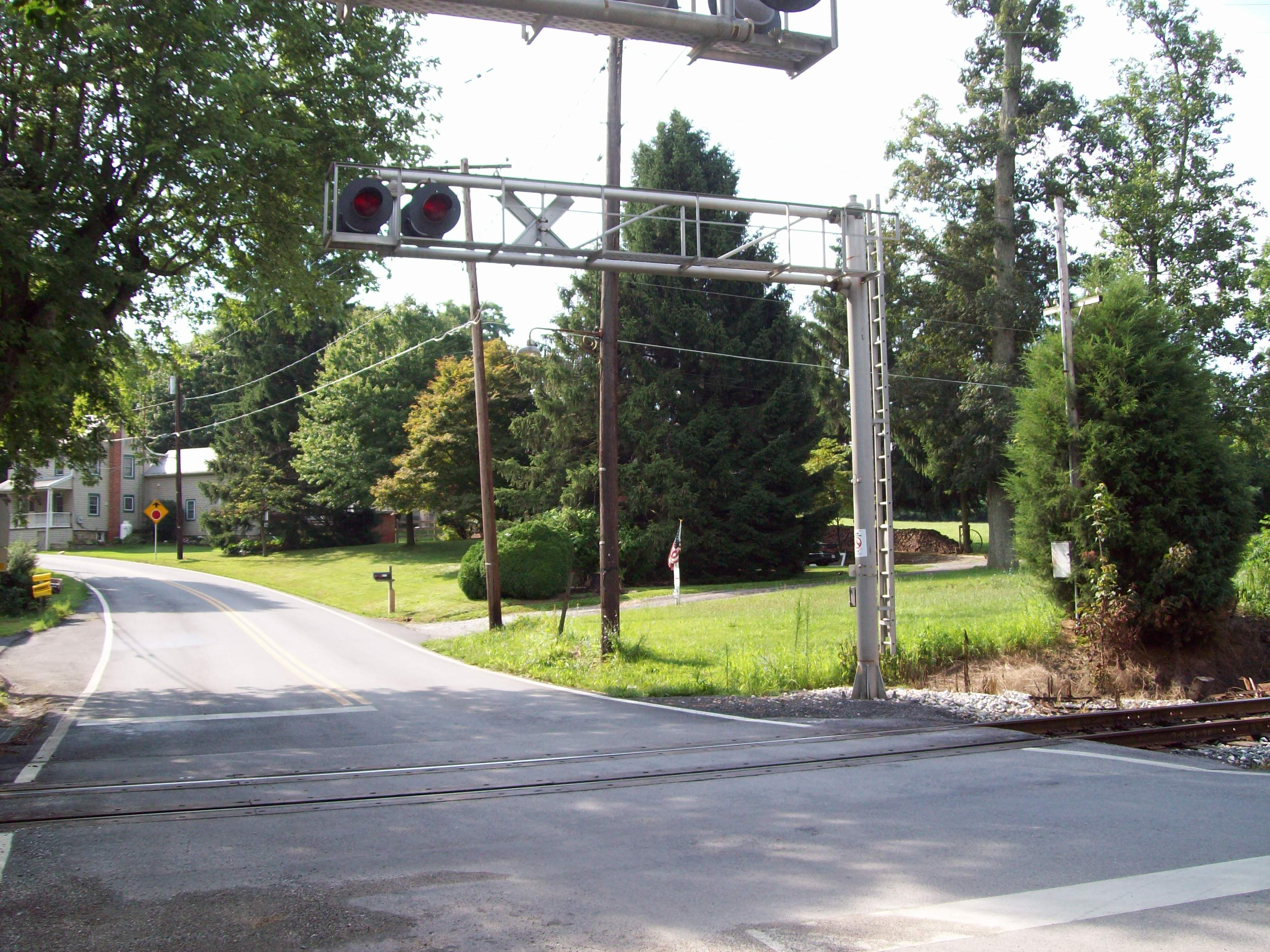
Intersection, Millers Station Rd and Young Rd, Millers, Maryland

Millers is an unincorporated community in Carroll County, Maryland, United States. The Jacob F. Shaffer Farm was listed on the National Register of Historic Places in 1998.

== Climate ==
According to the Köppen Climate Classification system, Millers has a humid subtropical climate, abbreviated "Cfa" on climate maps. The hottest temperature recorded in Millers was 102 °F (38.9 °C) on July 22, 2011, while the coldest temperature recorded was −13 °F (−25.0 °C) on January 19, 1994.

Climate data for Millers, Maryland, 1991–2020 normals, extremes 1988–present
Month	Jan	Feb	Mar	Apr	May	Jun	Jul	Aug	Sep	Oct	Nov	Dec	Year
Record high °F (°C)	71 (22)	79 (26)	85 (29)	90 (32)	92 (33)	96 (36)	102 (39)	98 (37)	96 (36)	91 (33)	82 (28)	75 (24)	102 (39)
Mean maximum °F (°C)	60.6 (15.9)	62.5 (16.9)	71.9 (22.2)	81.9 (27.7)	86.8 (30.4)	90.5 (32.5)	92.8 (33.8)	91.5 (33.1)	87.6 (30.9)	80.8 (27.1)	71.8 (22.1)	62.6 (17.0)	93.9 (34.4)
Mean daily maximum °F (°C)	39.5 (4.2)	42.9 (6.1)	51.8 (11.0)	64.5 (18.1)	73.2 (22.9)	80.8 (27.1)	84.9 (29.4)	83.1 (28.4)	76.7 (24.8)	65.4 (18.6)	53.9 (12.2)	43.7 (6.5)	63.4 (17.4)
Daily mean °F (°C)	31.6 (−0.2)	34.1 (1.2)	41.8 (5.4)	53.2 (11.8)	62.3 (16.8)	70.4 (21.3)	74.6 (23.7)	72.9 (22.7)	66.5 (19.2)	55.4 (13.0)	44.9 (7.2)	36.1 (2.3)	53.7 (12.0)
Mean daily minimum °F (°C)	23.7 (−4.6)	25.3 (−3.7)	31.9 (−0.1)	41.8 (5.4)	51.3 (10.7)	60.0 (15.6)	64.4 (18.0)	62.6 (17.0)	56.3 (13.5)	45.4 (7.4)	35.9 (2.2)	28.4 (−2.0)	43.9 (6.6)
Mean minimum °F (°C)	4.7 (−15.2)	7.7 (−13.5)	14.4 (−9.8)	27.1 (−2.7)	36.5 (2.5)	46.9 (8.3)	53.9 (12.2)	51.7 (10.9)	41.5 (5.3)	30.0 (−1.1)	20.4 (−6.4)	12.4 (−10.9)	2.0 (−16.7)
Record low °F (°C)	−13 (−25)	−7 (−22)	0 (−18)	21 (−6)	30 (−1)	42 (6)	47 (8)	44 (7)	35 (2)	24 (−4)	14 (−10)	−1 (−18)	−13 (−25)
Average precipitation inches (mm)	3.58 (91)	2.94 (75)	4.14 (105)	3.84 (98)	3.96 (101)	3.80 (97)	4.73 (120)	4.19 (106)	5.11 (130)	4.19 (106)	3.36 (85)	4.04 (103)	47.88 (1,217)
Average snowfall inches (cm)	9.7 (25)	10.8 (27)	6.3 (16)	0.5 (1.3)	0.0 (0.0)	0.0 (0.0)	0.0 (0.0)	0.0 (0.0)	0.0 (0.0)	0.2 (0.51)	1.0 (2.5)	5.6 (14)	34.1 (86.31)
Average extreme snow depth inches (cm)	6.1 (15)	6.9 (18)	4.1 (10)	0.1 (0.25)	0.0 (0.0)	0.0 (0.0)	0.0 (0.0)	0.0 (0.0)	0.0 (0.0)	0.2 (0.51)	0.5 (1.3)	2.9 (7.4)	11.6 (29)
Average precipitation days (≥ 0.01 in)	11.5	10.8	12.0	12.7	13.8	12.2	11.8	10.6	10.1	10.1	9.6	11.3	136.5
Average snowy days (≥ 0.1 in)	5.4	4.9	3.3	0.5	0.0	0.0	0.0	0.0	0.0	0.1	0.8	3.4	18.4
Source 1: NOAA
Source 2: National Weather Service
