= Rockland Farm (Westminster, Maryland) =

- U.S. National Register of Historic Places
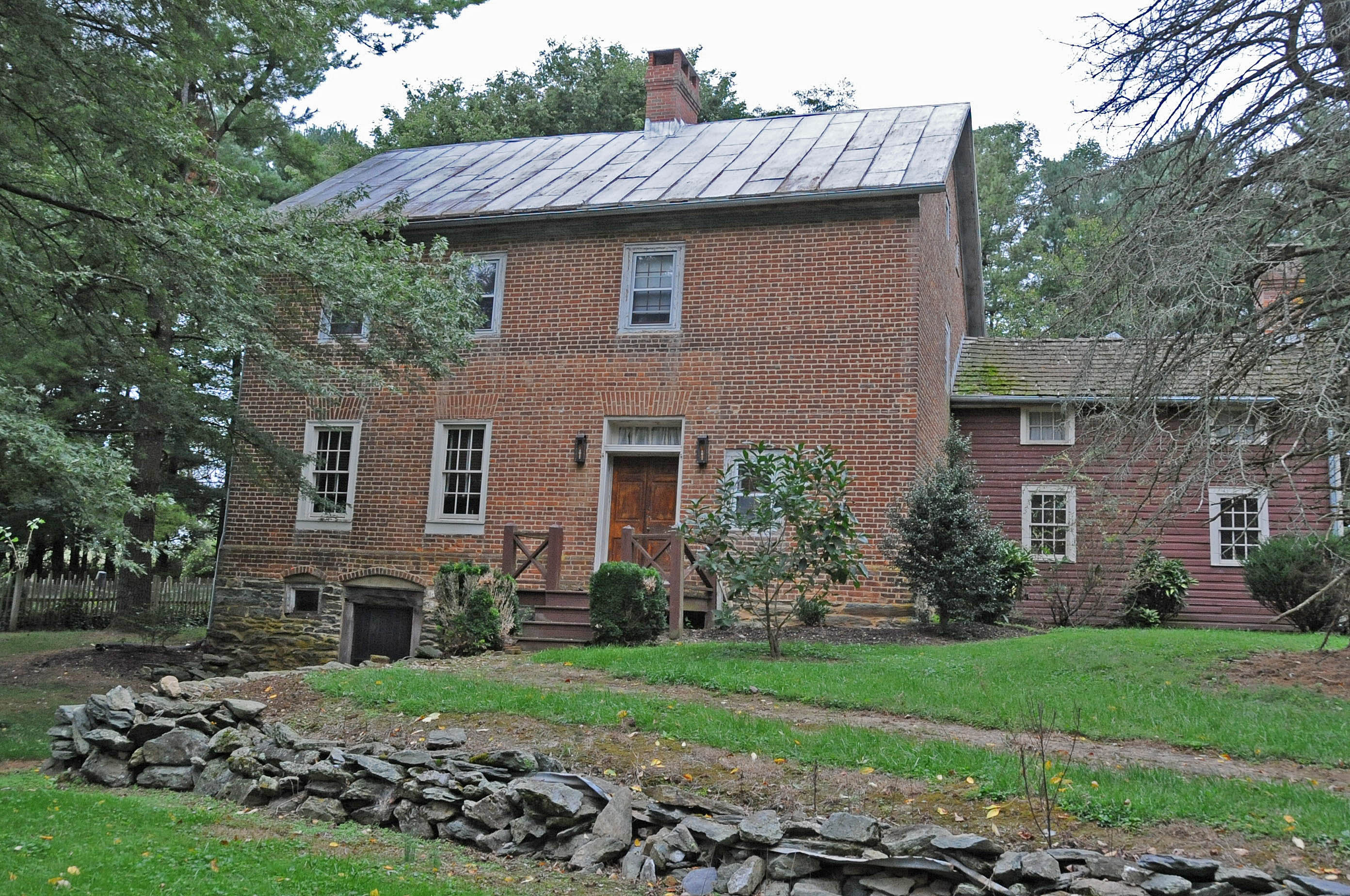

- Location within Maryland Location within the United States
- Location: 201 Rockland Road, Westminster, Maryland
- Coordinates: 39°34′30″N 77°2′50″W
- Area: 13.2 acres (5.3 ha)
- Built: 1795
- Built by: Arter, Michael
- Architectural style: Pennsylvania German
- NRHP reference No.: 86001730
- Added to NRHP: August 21, 1986

Rockland Farm is a historic home and farm complex located at Westminster, Carroll County, Maryland, United States. The complex consists of a brick house, the stone foundation of an 18th-century springhouse, as well as a large frame barn and a corn crib, both dating to the late 19th century. The house, built in 1795, retains the Pennsylvania German traditional three-room plan with a central chimney. It is a two-story, three-bay by two-bay brick structure on a stone foundation built into a slope.

Rockland Farm was listed on the National Register of Historic Places in 1986.
