= Ludwick Rudisel Tannery House =

Historic house in Maryland, United States

- U.S. National Register of Historic Places
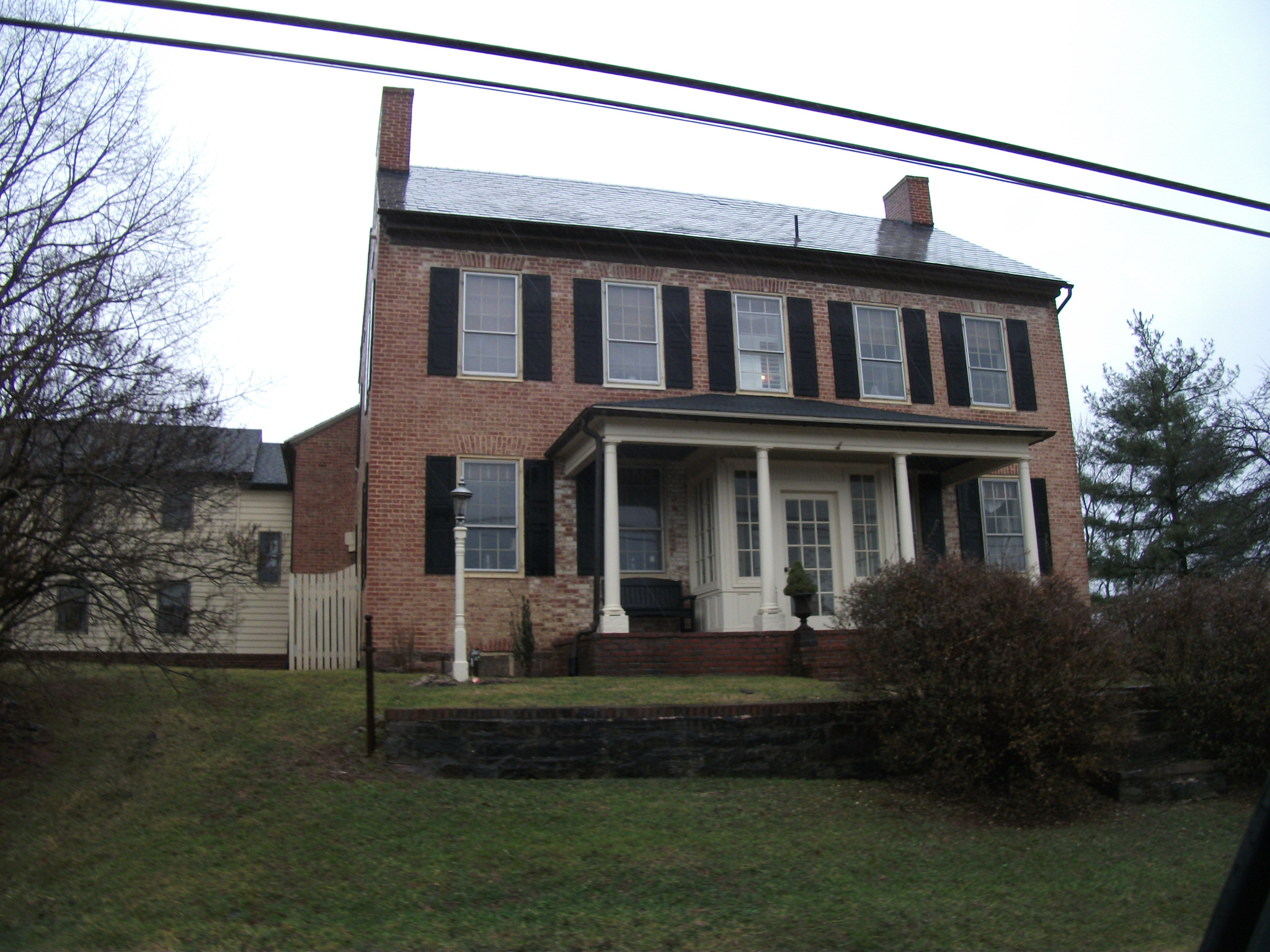
- Ludwick Rudisel Tannery House, March 2011

- Location within Maryland Location within the United States
- Location: 65 Frederick St., Taneytown, Maryland
- Coordinates: 39°39′27″N 77°10′45″W
- Area: 0.8 acres (0.32 ha)
- Built: 1807
- Architectural style: Georgian
- NRHP reference No.: 80001802
- Added to NRHP: November 10, 1980

The Ludwick Rudisel Tannery House, also known as Motter Place, is a historic home located at Taneytown, Carroll County, Maryland, United States. The main block is constructed of brick on a fieldstone foundation, five bays in length, two deep, with an original slate roof, built about 1807. Attached is a two-story, two-bay-long brick kitchen. The house features Georgian massing and fine Federal detailing.

The Ludwick Rudisel Tannery House was listed on the National Register of Historic Places in 2006.
