= Andrew P. Frizzell House and Farm Complex =

Historic house in Maryland

- U.S. National Register of Historic Places
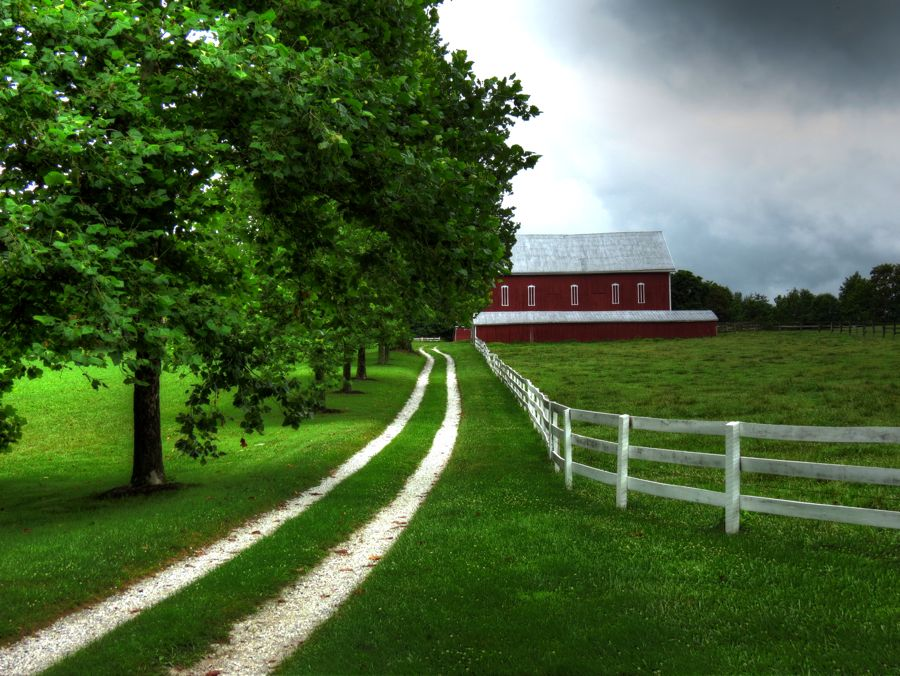

- Location within Maryland Location within the United States
- Location: 3801 Salem Bottom Rd., Westminster, Maryland
- Coordinates: 39°27′30″N 77°3′8″W
- Area: 13.2 acres (5.3 ha)
- Built: 1896
- Architectural style: Late Victorian
- NRHP reference No.: 86002391
- Added to NRHP: September 11, 1986

The Andrew P. Frizzell House and Farm Complex is a historic home and farm complex located at Westminster, Carroll County, Maryland, United States.

== Characteristics ==
It is a well-preserved example of the Victorian style. It is a two-story brick home built in 1896 with a five-bay symmetrical façade. Also on the property are a washhouse/smokehouse, privy, chicken house, corn crib, and bank barn. Its owner, Andrew P. Frizzell, hosted a reception for Republican Governor Lloyd Lowndes at his farm shortly after the house was constructed.

The Andrew P. Frizzell House was listed on the National Register of Historic Places in 1986.
