= Winemiller Family Farm =

- U.S. National Register of Historic Places
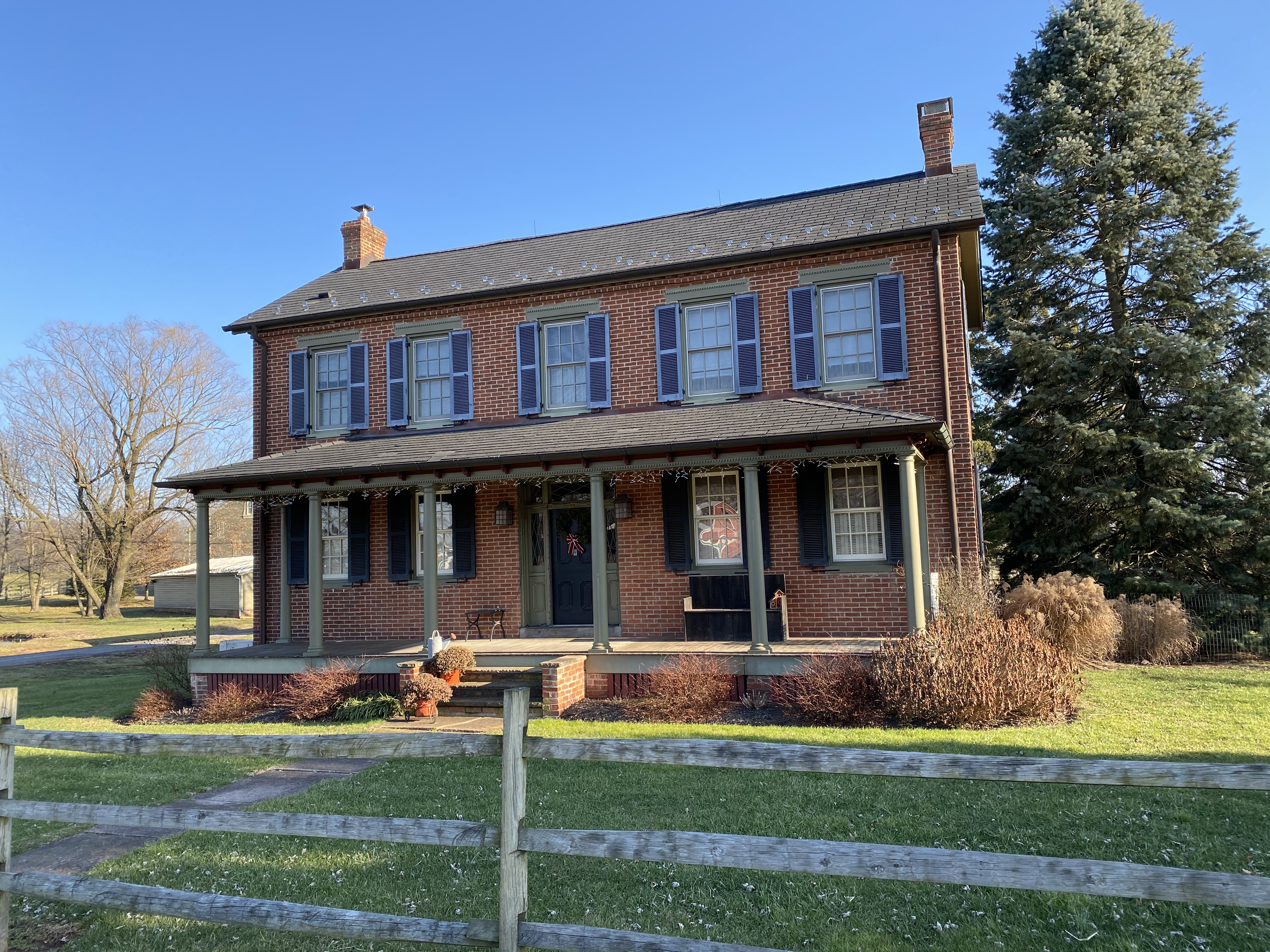

- Location within Maryland Location within the United States
- Location: 1909 Francis Scott Key Highway (Maryland Route 194), Taneytown, Maryland
- Coordinates: 39°37′39.8″N 77°13′12″W
- Area: 3 acres (1.2 ha)
- NRHP reference No.: 06000743
- Added to NRHP: August 30, 2006

The Winemiller Family Farm is a historic home and farm complex located at Taneytown, Carroll County, Maryland, United States. The complex consists of a large two-story brick house built about 1865, a frame bank barn, and several outbuildings. It is a representative example of a type of family farm complex that characterized rural agricultural Carroll County from about 1850 through the early 20th century.

The Winemiller Family Farm was listed on the National Register of Historic Places in 2006.
