= McMurray–Frizzell–Aldridge Farm =

- U.S. National Register of Historic Places
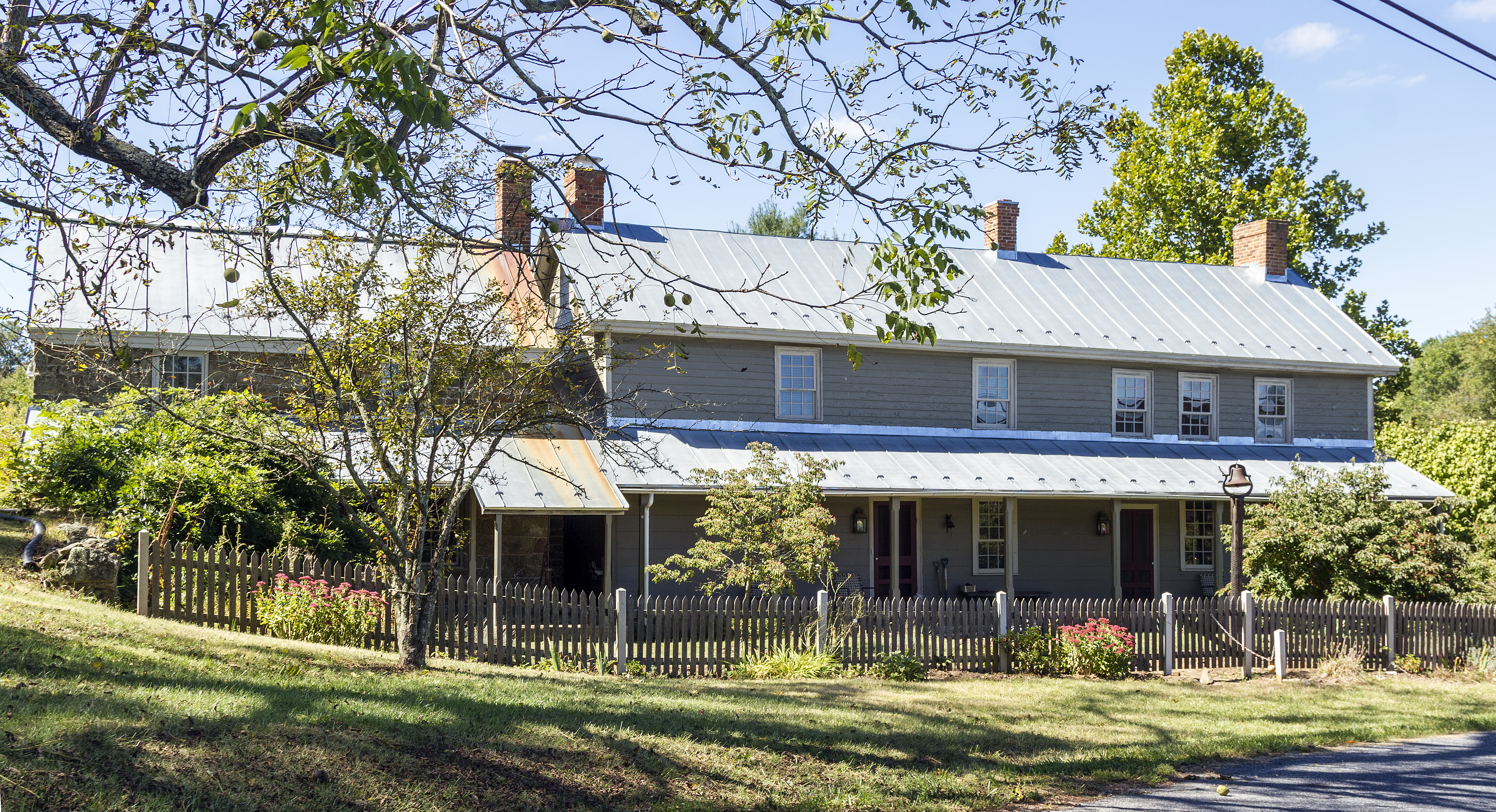
- Main house

- Location within Maryland Location within the United States
- Location: 3708 Baker Road, Westminster, Maryland
- Coordinates: 39°28′18.7″N 77°3′09.65″W
- Area: 4.5 acres (1.8 ha)
- Built: 1790
- NRHP reference No.: 01000339
- Added to NRHP: April 13, 2001

The McMurray–Frizzell–Aldridge Farm is a historic home and farm complex located at Westminster, Carroll County, Maryland, United States. It consists of a log house constructed about 1790 and later enlarged, and several 19th and early 20th century domestic and agricultural outbuildings, including a stone summer kitchen, a frame smokehouse, a frame bank barn, a frame wagon shed, a frame hog pen, and a stone spring house.

The McMurray–Frizzell–Aldridge Farm was listed on the National Register of Historic Places in 2001.
