= Keefer–Brubaker Farm =

- U.S. National Register of Historic Places
- Location within Maryland Location within the United States
- Location: 2719 Roop Road, Taneytown, Maryland
- Coordinates: 39°39′14.9″N 77°12′10.2″W
- Area: 4 acres (1.6 ha)
- Built: 1820
- NRHP reference No.: 07001286
- Added to NRHP: December 20, 2007

Keefer–Brubaker Farm, also known as the Oscar Fogle Farm, is a historic home and farm complex located at Taneytown, Carroll County, Maryland. It consists of a two-story six-by-two-bay log-and-frame house which is partially encased in brick and rests on a rubble stone foundation Also on the property is a frame summer kitchen, a combination smokehouse/dry house, a frame springhouse, a shop building, a bank barn, a dairy, a hog pen, a tool shed, poultry house, and several more recent buildings. It is a representative example of a family farm complex which spans the period from the late 18th century to the mid 20th century.

It was listed on the National Register of Historic Places in 2006.
