= Solomon Arter House =

Historic house in Maryland, United States

- U.S. National Register of Historic Places
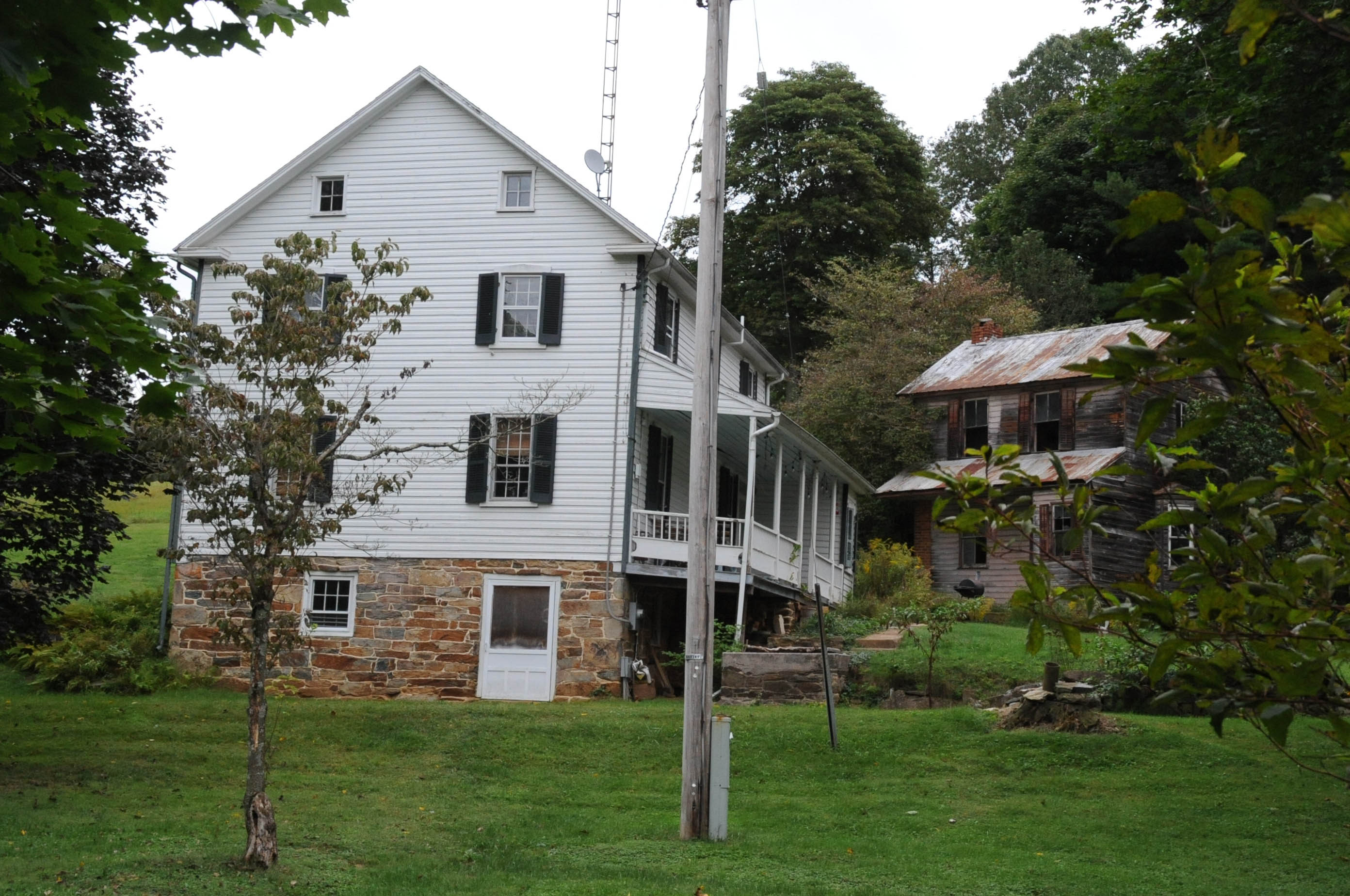

- Location within Maryland Location within the United States
- Location: 4029 Geeting Rd., Union Mills, Maryland
- Coordinates: 39°41′11″N 76°59′27″W
- Area: 10 acres (4.0 ha)
- Built: 1810
- Architectural style: Pennsylvania German
- NRHP reference No.: 87001569
- Added to NRHP: September 10, 1987

The Solomon Arter House is a historic two-story, three-bay log home in Union Mills, Carroll County, Maryland, United States. It was built in about 1810 by Solomon Arter, a member of the Arter family that was prominent in the Pennsylvania German culture of this region. The structure is representative of Pennsylvania German domestic architecture in Carroll County, and is significant for the preservation of its interior stenciling. Also on the property is an 1872 bank barn, hogpen, and 1883 frame Victorian tenant house.

The Solomon Arter House was listed on the National Register of Historic Places in 1987.

The house lies outside area of the proposed Union Mills Reservoir.
