= Ladiesburg, Maryland =

Unincorporated community in Maryland, United States

- Unincorporated community
- Location in Maryland Ladiesburg (the United States)
- Coordinates: 39°34′35″N 77°15′54″W
- Country: United States
- State: Maryland
- County: Frederick
- Elevation: 476 ft (145 m)
- ZIP code: 21757
- GNIS feature ID: 590619

Ladiesburg is an unincorporated community in Frederick County, in the U.S. state of Maryland.
