= Philip and Uriah Arter Farm =

Historic house in Maryland, United States

- U.S. National Register of Historic Places
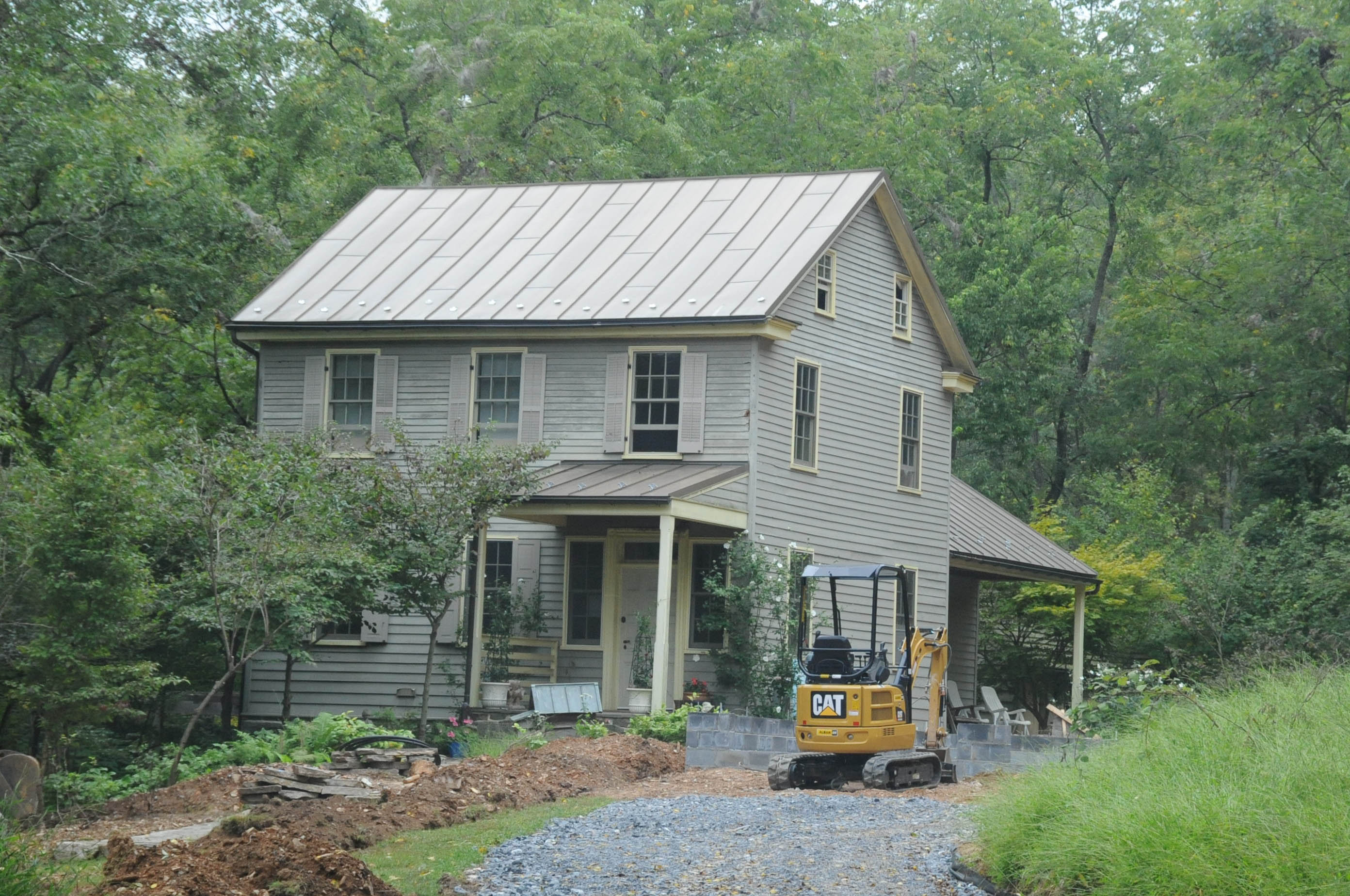

- Location within Maryland Location within the United States
- Location: 10 Deep Run Road W., Union Mills, Maryland
- Coordinates: 39°41′1.5″N 76°59′53.1″W
- Area: 205.9 acres (83.3 ha)
- NRHP reference No.: 06001124
- Added to NRHP: December 12, 2006

Philip and Uriah Arter Farm is a historic home and farm complex located at Union Mills, Carroll County, Maryland. The complex includes a frame house built about 1844, a frame bank barn built about 1888, and a deteriorated early-20th-century frame outbuilding. The house is a well-preserved example of a middling farmer's dwelling house from mid-19th-century Maryland.

It was listed on the National Register of Historic Places in 2006.
