= Frizzle =

Frizzle may refer to:

- Frizzle (chicken plumage), a domestic chicken plumage pattern featuring curled feathers
- Frizzle chicken (breed), a specific breed of domestic chicken featuring the frizzle plumage pattern
- Ms. Frizzle, a character in The Magic School Bus
- To fry (food)

== See also ==
- Frizzle Fry, an album by Primus
- Frizzle Sizzle, a Dutch musical group
- Frizzled, a family of proteins
