= Eldersburg, Maryland =

Unincorporated community in Maryland, United States

- Census-designated place
- Location of Eldersburg, Maryland
- Coordinates: 39°24′3″N 76°57′5″W
- Country: United States
- State: Maryland
- County: Carroll

Area
  - Total: 42.36 sq mi (109.72 km^{2})
  - Land: 39.83 sq mi (103.16 km^{2})
  - Water: 2.54 sq mi (6.57 km^{2})
- Elevation: 643 ft (196 m)

Population (2020)
  - Total: 32,582
  - Density: 818.0/sq mi (315.84/km^{2})
- Time zone: UTC−5 (Eastern (EST))
  - Summer (DST): UTC−4 (EDT)
- ZIP code: 21784
- Area codes: 410,443,667
- FIPS code: 24-25575
- GNIS feature ID: 0590147
- Website: www.eldersburgofficial.com

Eldersburg is an unincorporated community and census-designated place (CDP) in Carroll County, Maryland, United States. The population was 30,531 at the 2010 census.

== History ==
Eldersburg is named after John Elder, who was given a land grant from the King of England. The community was served by a post office in April 1850 in the Howard district of Anne Arundel County with the name "Eldersburgh." In 1851, Howard County was formed, and on October 28, 1871, the post office moved to Carroll County, retaining the "Eldersburgh" spelling. In December 1894, "Eldersburgh" was shortened to "Eldersburg". The Moses Brown House was listed on the National Register of Historic Places in 1980. Wesley Chapel Methodist Episcopal Church was listed in 1984.

== Geography ==
Eldersburg is located in the southeastern portion of Carroll County at 39°24′3″N 76°57′5″W (39.400802, −76.951475). It is bordered to the east by Baltimore County and to the south by Howard County, except where it is bordered by the town of Sykesville.

The center of Eldersburg is at the intersection of Maryland Route 26 (Liberty Road) and Maryland Route 32 (Sykesville Road). MD 26 leads east 20 miles (32 km) to downtown Baltimore and west 28 miles (45 km) to Frederick, while MD 32 leads north 15 miles (24 km) to Westminster, the Carroll County seat, and south 20 miles (32 km) to Columbia.

According to the United States Census Bureau, the Eldersburg CDP has a total area of 42.2 square miles (109.4 km^{2}), of which 39.7 square miles (102.8 km^{2}) is land and 2.5 square miles (6.6 km^{2}), or 6.00%, is water.

== Demographics ==
Historical population
Census	Pop.	Note	%±
2010	30,531		—
2020	32,582		6.7%
U.S. Decennial Census

=== 2020 census ===
As of the 2020 census, Eldersburg had a population of 32,582. The median age was 40.9 years. 23.2% of residents were under the age of 18 and 15.5% of residents were 65 years of age or older. For every 100 females there were 101.5 males, and for every 100 females age 18 and over there were 99.4 males age 18 and over.

80.5% of residents lived in urban areas, while 19.5% lived in rural areas.

There were 11,324 households in Eldersburg, of which 36.9% had children under the age of 18 living in them. Of all households, 66.1% were married-couple households, 11.2% were households with a male householder and no spouse or partner present, and 18.5% were households with a female householder and no spouse or partner present. About 18.4% of all households were made up of individuals and 9.8% had someone living alone who was 65 years of age or older.

There were 11,667 housing units, of which 2.9% were vacant. The homeowner vacancy rate was 0.8% and the rental vacancy rate was 9.5%.

Racial composition as of the 2020 census
Race	Number	Percent
White	27,306	83.8%
Black or African American	1,518	4.7%
American Indian and Alaska Native	71	0.2%
Asian	1,233	3.8%
Native Hawaiian and Other Pacific Islander	4	0.0%
Some other race	369	1.1%
Two or more races	2,081	6.4%
Hispanic or Latino (of any race)	1,264	3.9%

=== 2010 census ===
As of the 2010 census, there were 30,531 people and 10,844 households within the CDP. The population density was 725.2 inhabitants per square mile (280.0/km^{2}). The racial makeup of the CDP was 92.44% White, 3.42% African American, 0.22% Native American, 1.98% Asian, 0.44% from other races, 0.76% from two or more races, and 1.47% of the population were Hispanic or Latino of any race. The majority of Hispanics and Latinos in Eldersburg identified as White; 75% of Latinos in Eldersburg were White and White Latinos comprised 1.7 of Eldersburg's total population. Non-Hispanics in Eldersburg were predominantly White; 90.8% of Eldersburg's residents were non-Hispanic whites, 3.4% were non-Hispanic blacks, and 2% were non-Hispanic Asians. By national origin, 27% of Eldersburg's Latinos were of Mexican descent, 18% were of Puerto Rican descent, and 9% were of Cuban descent.

=== 2000 census ===
According to the 2000 Census, there were 9,138 households, of which 44.1% included children under the age of 18, 72.2% were married couples, 7.1% were single females, and 17.9% were non-families. 14.8% of all households were individuals, and 7.2% of households consisted of someone 65 years of age or older living alone. The average household size was 2.92, and the average family size was 3.25. As of 2000, the ancestry of Eldersburg's residents was 24% German, 18% Irish, 13% English, 8% Italian, 5% Polish, 3% Black or African-American, 2% French, 2% Scottish and 2% Dutch. People of Scotch-Irish, Swedish, Greek, Welsh, Russian, Hungarian, Slovak and Lithuanian descent each comprised 1% of the population.

Census data found that 29.1% of the population were under the age of 18, 5.9% were 18 to 24, 31.9% were 25 to 44, 23.7% were 45 to 64, and 9.4% were 65 or older. The median age was 36. For every 100 females, there were 101.3 males. For every 100 females age 18 and over, there were 98.4 males.

The median income for a household was $70,851, and the median income for a family was $75,848. Males had a median income of $51,473; females had a median income of $34,728. The per capita income was $25,639. About 1.6% of families and 2.4% of the population were below the poverty line, including 1.9% of those under age 18 and 4.6% of those age 65 or over.

=== Accolades ===
In 2007, Money.com ranked Eldersburg 56th in its "Top 100 Places to Live." In 2009, Eldersburg ranked 47th on the same list.

== Religion ==
=== Christianity ===
Christianity is the dominant religion in Eldersburg. Eldersburg is home to Wesley Chapel Methodist Episcopal Church, one of the earliest Methodist congregations in the United States. Carroll County was a birthplace of Methodism in the United States.

=== Judaism ===
The Chabad Jewish Center of Carroll County, an Orthodox synagogue, was founded in Eldersburg in 2013. Prior to Chabad, Carroll County had no synagogue for years. A decade before, the only synagogue in Carroll County was Beth Shalom, a Conservative synagogue that no longer exists. Beginning in 1996, Beth Shalom was operating the only Jewish school in Carroll County. Eldersburg is also home to the Eldersburg Jewish Congregation, a Conservative synagogue that operated the Eldersburg Hebrew Learning Center. In 2013, the Hebrew Learning Center was merged into A Hebrew School in Your Neighborhood, a program run by Beth El of Pikesville.

== Education ==
Eldersburg is served by the Carroll County public school system. The elementary schools include Eldersburg Elementary, Carrolltowne Elementary, Piney Ridge Elementary, Freedom Elementary School, and Linton Springs Elementary. The middle schools include Oklahoma Road Middle School and Sykesville Middle School (located in Sykesville). The high schools include Liberty High School, South Carroll High School, and Century High School.

== Transportation ==
The Carroll Transit System runs the South Carroll TrailBlazer (Red Route), which links Eldersburg to Sykesville, as well as the Eldersburg-Westminster TrailBlazer (Blue Route) which links Eldersburg to Westminster. The Owings Mills station of the Baltimore Metro SubwayLink in nearby Owings Mills in Baltimore County, is a 20-minute drive by car from Eldersburg and provides subway access to downtown Baltimore.

There is no bus link between Eldersburg and nearby Randallstown in Baltimore County, in part due to longstanding opposition to inter-county public transit from Carroll County officials and residents.
