= Keymar, Maryland =

Unincorporated community in Maryland, U.S.

Coordinates: 39°35′58″N 77°14′13″W

Keymar in Maryland

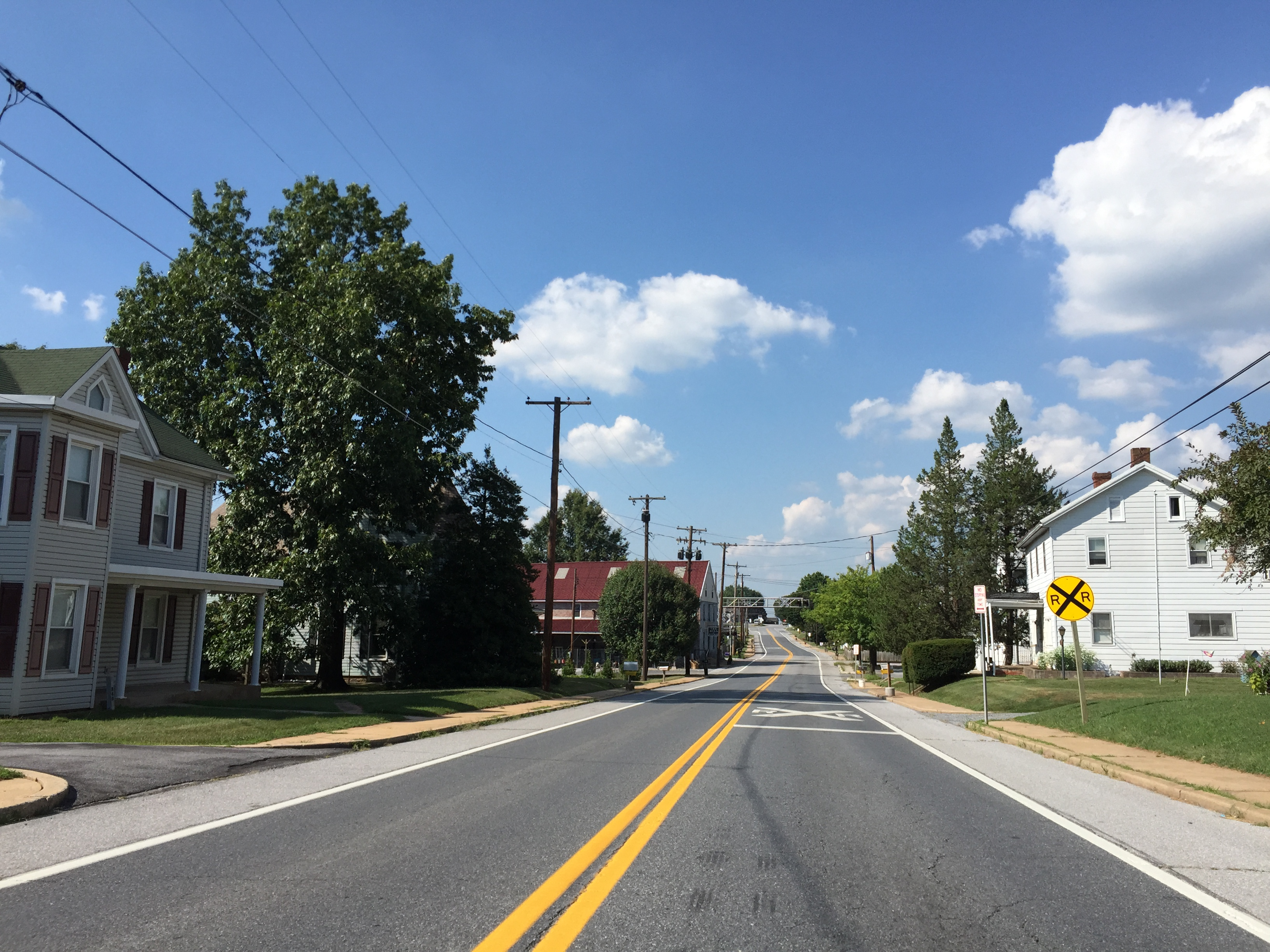
View north along MD 194 in Keymar

Keymar is an unincorporated community in Carroll County, Maryland, United States. The name of the community is a portmanteau of the family name Key (of which Francis Scott Key was a member) and Mar for Maryland. In 1822, Francis Scott Key sold his father's mansion and estate on Pipe Creek near this community. Keymar was likely the name of that estate.

Cover's Tannery was listed on the National Register of Historic Places in 2019.
