= Linwood =

Linwood may refer to:

== People ==
- Linwood (name)

== Places ==
=== United Kingdom ===
- Linwood, Hampshire, England
- Linwood, Lincolnshire, England
- Linwood, Renfrewshire, Scotland

=== United States ===
- Linwood, Indiana
- Linwood, Kansas
- Linwood, Richmond, Kentucky, home of Brutus J. Clay II
- Linwood (Jackson, Louisiana), listed on the NRHP in East Feliciana Parish
- Linwood, Carroll County, Maryland
  - Linwood Historic District (Linwood, Maryland)
- Linwood, Howard County, Maryland
- Linwood, Massachusetts
  - Linwood Historic District (Northbridge, Massachusetts)
- Linwood, Michigan
- Linwood Township, Anoka County, Minnesota
- Linwood, Nebraska
  - Linwood Site, listed on the NRHP in Butler County
  - Linwood Township, Butler County, Nebraska
- Linwood, New Jersey, in Atlantic County
- Linwood, Bergen County, New Jersey
- Linwood, North Carolina
- Linwood, Cincinnati, Ohio
- Linwood, Pennsylvania
- Linwood, Utah
- Linwood, Wisconsin
- Linwood, West Virginia

=== Elsewhere ===
- Linwood, South Australia, Australia
- Linwood, Nova Scotia, Canada
- Linwood, Ontario, Canada
- Linwood, New Zealand
  - Linwood (New Zealand electorate)

== Schools ==
- Linwood High School, Scotland
- Linwood Female College, near Gastonia, North Carolina, US
- Linwood Public Schools, New Jersey, US
- Lin-Wood Public School, serving Lincoln and Woodstock, New Hampshire, US
- Mary Linwood Comprehensive School, Leicester, England
- Te Aratai College, New Zealand, founded as Linwood High School, then renamed Linwood College

== See also ==
- Linnwood (disambiguation)
- Lynnwood (disambiguation)
- Lynwood (disambiguation)
- Linwood Lake (disambiguation)
- Linwood bank robbery (1969), Linwood, Renfrewshire, Scotland
- Linwood Boulevard (Kansas City, Missouri), US
  - Linwood Shopping Center
- Linwood Gardens (New York), US
- Linwood Park, in Vermilion, Ohio, US
- Linwood Peak, Antarctica
- Linwood Springs Research Station, Stevens Point, Wisconsin, US
