= Lynnwood (disambiguation) =

Lynnwood is a city in the Seattle metropolitan area in the US state of Washington.

Lynnwood may also refer to:

== Places ==
- Lynnwood, Edmonton, Alberta, Canada
- Lynnwood, an area of Hawick, Scottish Borders
- Lynnwood, Pretoria, South Africa
- Lynnwood (Wakefield, Massachusetts), US, a historic house
- Lynnwood, Washington, US, city in Snohomish County
- Lynnwood, Pennsylvania (disambiguation), several places
- Lynnwood, Virginia (disambiguation), several places

== People ==
- Lynnwood Farnam (1885–1930), Canadian organist

== See also ==
- Linwood (disambiguation)
- Linnwood (disambiguation)
- Lynwood (disambiguation)
