= Linwood (name) =

Linwood is both a surname and a given name. Notable people with the name include:

== People with the surname ==
- Alec Linwood (1920–2003), Scottish footballer
- Elliott Linwood (born 1956), American artist
- Mary Linwood (1755–1845), British needle woman
- Paul Linwood (born 1983), English footballer
- Sonja Kristina Linwood (born 1949), English singer

== People with the given name ==
- Linwood Barclay (born 1955), Canadian-American humourist, author and columnist
- Linwood Boomer (born 1955), Canadian-American television producer, writer, and actor
- Linwood Earl Briley (1954–1984), American murderer
- Linwood Vrooman Carter or Lin Carter (1930–1988), American author
- Linwood Clark (1876–1965), American politician
- Linwood G. Dunn (1904–1998), American cinematographer and special effects artist
- Linwood Murrow, fictional character in the Angel TV series
- Linwood Pendleton (born 1964), American environmental economist
- Linwood H. Rose (born 1951), American university president

== See also ==
- Lynn Faulds Wood
