= Linnwood =

Linnwood may refer to:

- Linnwood, Guildford, New South Wales, Australia, a heritage-listed house
- Linnwood (Ellicott City, Maryland), US, a heritage listed house

== See also ==
- Linwood (disambiguation)
- Lynnwood (disambiguation)
- Lynwood (disambiguation)
