= Nassos Daphnis =

Greek-American abstract painter, sculptor and tree peony breeder (1914–2010)

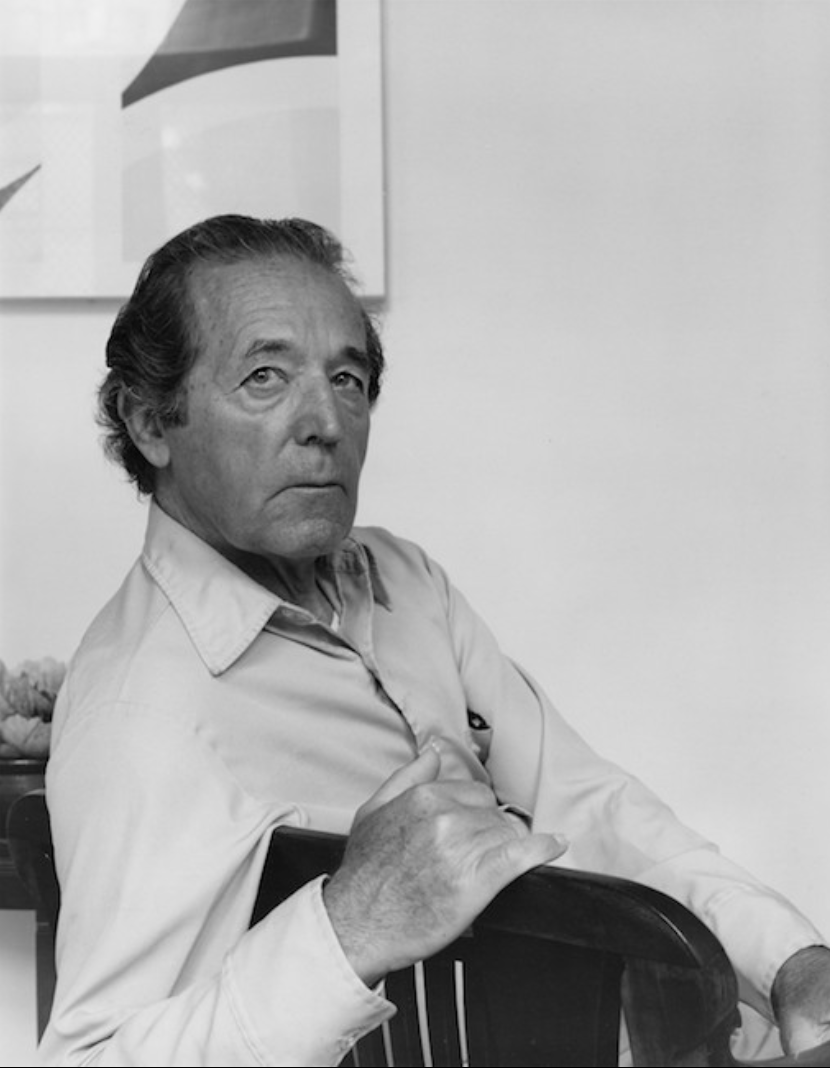
- Born: July 23, 1914; Krokeai, Greece
- Died: November 23, 2010 (aged 96); Provincetown, Massachusetts, U.S.
- Known for: Painting, Sculpture, Tree Peonies
- Movement: Geometric abstraction, Hard-edge painting

Nassos Daphnis (July 23, 1914 – November 23, 2010) was a Greek-born American abstract painter, sculptor and tree peony breeder.

== Early life ==
Daphnis was born in Krokeai in the Kingdom of Greece on July 23, 1914.

=== Army service ===
Daphnis served in the United States Army from 1942 to 1945. During his service he was asked to put his skills as a painter to use and created camouflage for use on enormous military relief maps. It is speculated by some art critics that it was while painting camouflage that Daphnis developed the signature flatness later recognizable in his abstract geometric paintings.

=== Education and training ===
While Daphnis is generally regarded as a self-taught artist, though he did pursue some formal training. Following his military service, Daphnis trained at the Art Students League of New York. From 1949-1951, Daphnis studied in Paris. From 1951 to 1952, he continued his studies at the Istituto Statale D'Arte in Firenze, Italy. In 1952 he returned again briefly to Paris for additional study.

== Biomorphic paintings: 1945–1949 ==
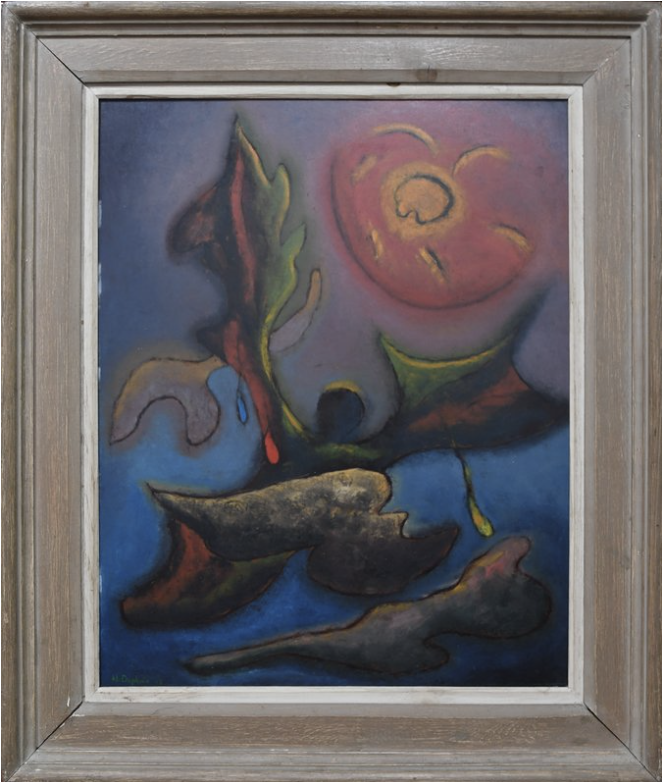
Nassos Daphnis 'Icarus' 1948 oil on masonite 30.00 x 24.00 in 76.2 x 61.0 cm

Daphnis' artistic style evolved throughout his career. He began as a realist and following the war, moved on to biomorphic forms with a Surrealist influence.

From March 24-April 11, 1947, Daphnis had an eponymous solo exhibition at the Contemporary Arts Gallery at 106 E 57th St, New York at which his biomorphic paintings were featured. The exhibition included both oil paintings and watercolors. It was his second show at the gallery and in his catalog essay, art historian Gordon B. Washburn found new promise in the works: "There is hardly one of them, nevertheless, which in its far distances or on its horizon, has failed to keep a promise of renewed life and ultimate happiness. Once, in his youthful years, Daphnis painted a vision of heaven and hell; but in those days his purgatory was as charming as his paradise, the devils a toy army. A new definition of good and evil has now been found, and in returning to a world of greater hope and faith he seizes the beauty of the natural world - especially its plant-life whose forms he has always deeply loved - with a thicker complex of emotions. His self-taught art, once picked out with one finger, its tunes like those heard on a sweet but lonely hillside from a shepherd's flute, are not polyphonic. Planning, close organization, and definition enter the pictures; and with those controls comes an abstraction which is increasing."

In a 1985 exhibition review, Grace Glueck described these works for the New York Times:

"Before developing his reductive line-color-plane approach...Daphnis was involved with biomorphic imagery. Part of his inspiration came from a botanical hobby: hybridizing tree peonies, an avocation he pursues to this day. At Kouros, a group of rarely seen canvases and watercolors from 1947-48 deals with organic, floral and undersea forms, in poetic compositions of luminous color. Despite their amorphous look, they have a well-ordered structure that doesn't seem too far removed from the artist's later concerns. In one of the strongest - called, in fact, Hybridization - plant leaves and stems, bathed in a shimmering light, are beautifully locked in a harmonious balance of shapes and hues."

== Color-plane theory and hard-edge painting: 1950s–2010 ==
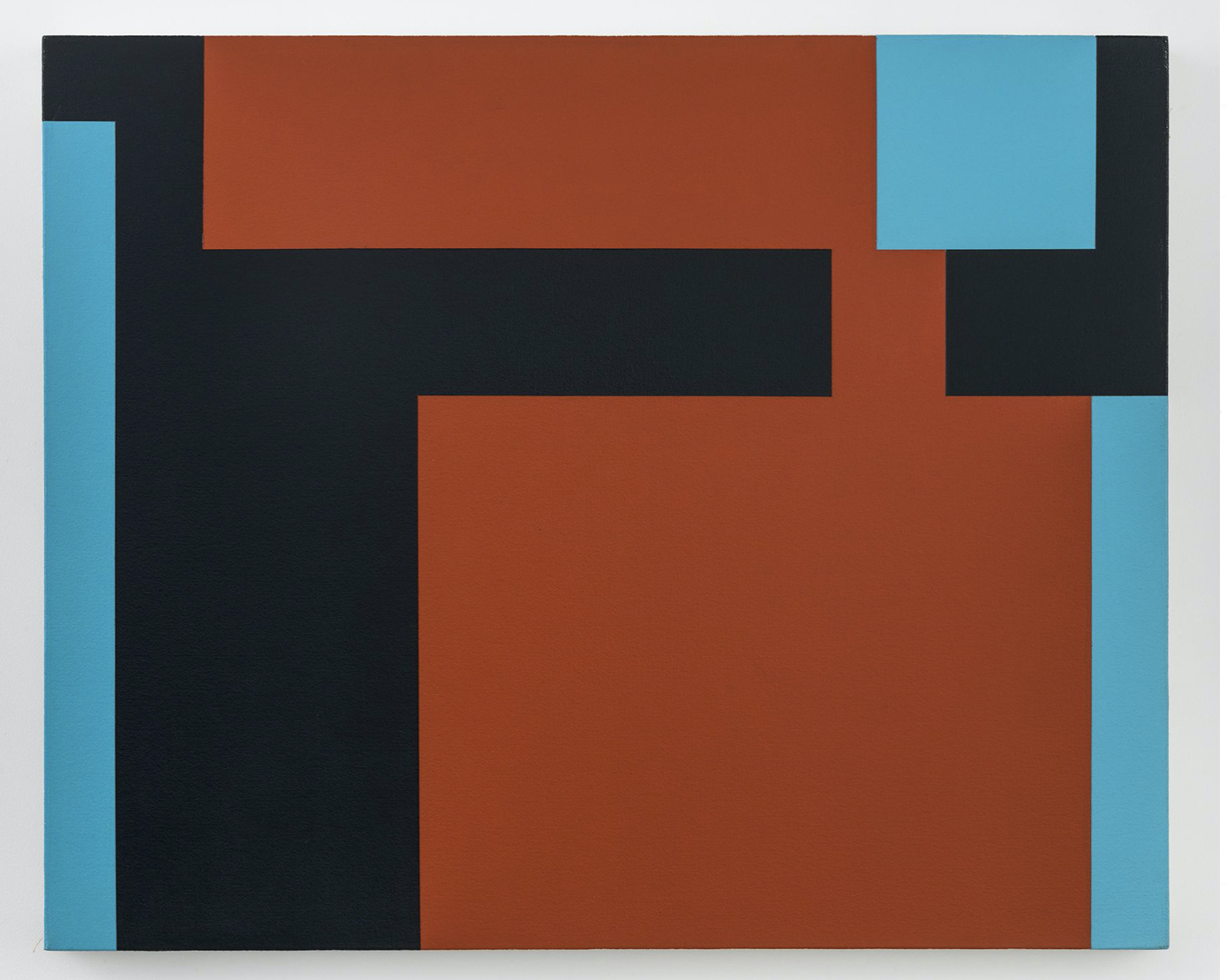
Nassos Daphnis '10-90' 1990 oil on canvas

In the 1950s, Daphnis traveled back to Greece with the assistance of the G.I. Bill. While there he began to see the stark, clear light change his perception of the buildings and forms around him. Structures were simplified and became geometric planes of pure color. Following this trop, Daphnis developed his color-plane theory and focused on geometric abstraction with a restricted color palette of only black, white and primary colors. This became his signature style and these works are often characterized as being painted in the Hard-edge style of geometric abstraction. His style is frequently compared with Piet Mondrian; however, Daphnis saw Mondrian's approach as a jumping off point. Daphnis was also described as an abstract imagist, a term which arose from a 1961 exhibition at the Solomon R. Guggenheim Museum, New York City, called American Abstract Expressionists and Imagists, in which he participated.

In the late 1980s, Daphnis' style evolved again as he began to integrate new forms of computer technology into his practice. Expanding on his color palette, he also incorporated a few additional colors. Daphnis' employment of computer-generated graphics and use of the Atari ST to develop his radical digital landscapes can best be understood as a proto New Media attitude.

== Gallery representation ==
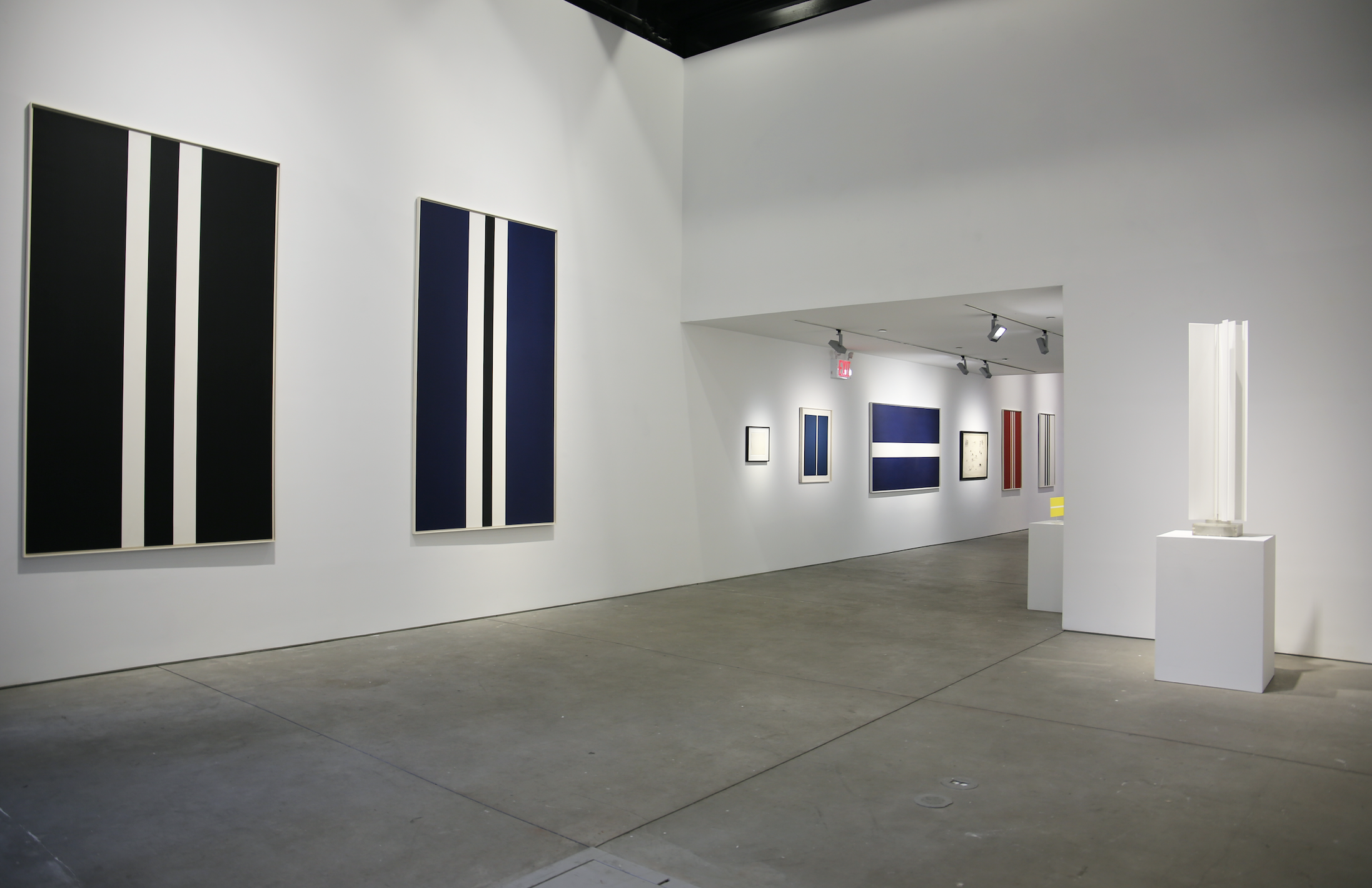
Richard Taittinger Gallery at 154 Ludlow Street Manhattan

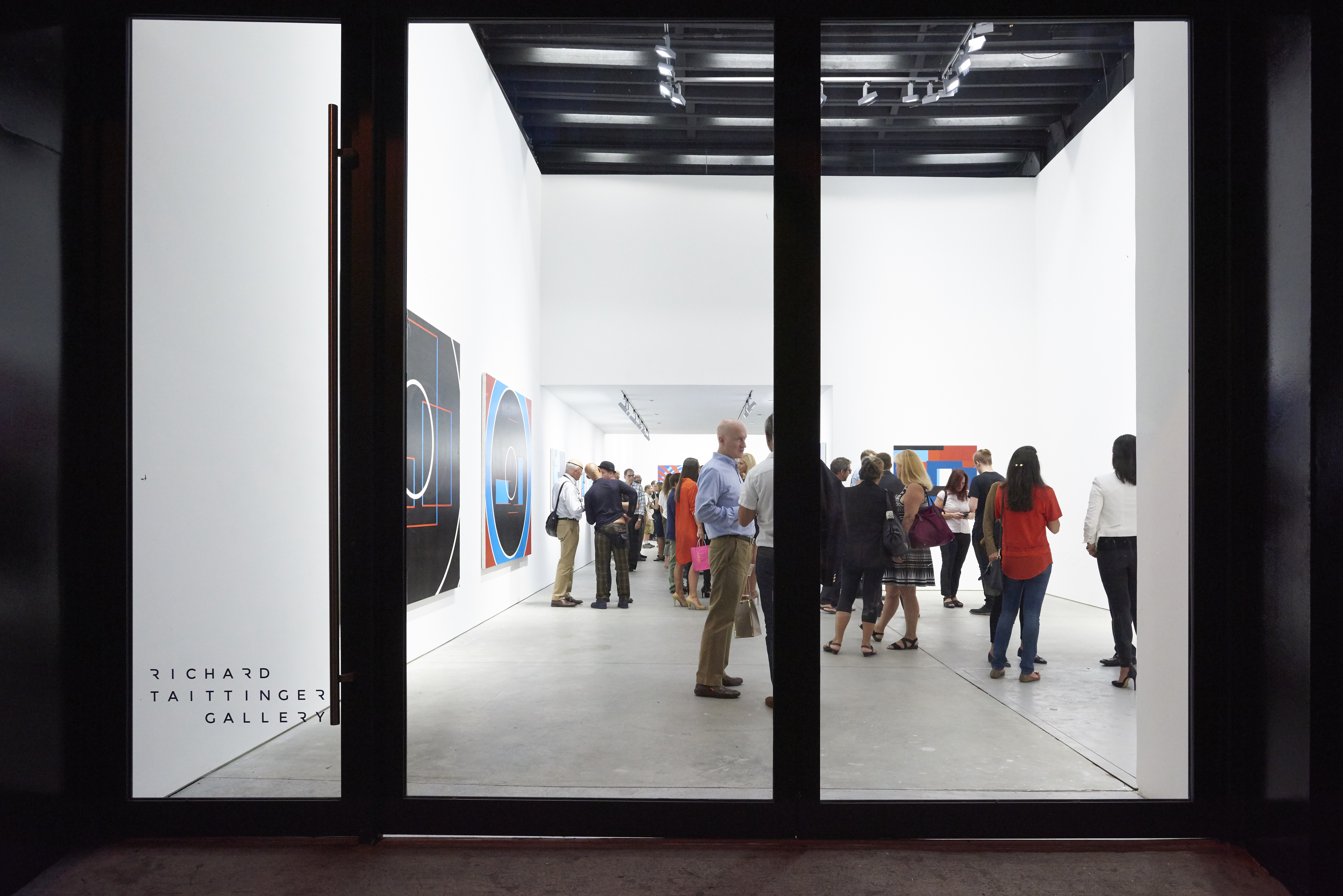
Richard Taittinger Gallery

For nearly forty years Daphnis was represented by the Leo Castelli Gallery. Castelli gave him 17 solo exhibitions in his gallery and regularly included his work in group exhibitions featuring artists such as Jasper Johns, Frank Stella, Robert Rauschenberg and Lee Bontecou. Castelli also regularly submitted Daphnis' works to exhibitions at a variety of galleries and institutions. For instance, from November 9-December 9, 1964, Daphnis' EPX 28-64 was included in "Art in Wood Today" as presented by the United States Plywood Corporation with the assistance of Dr. Richard McLanathan of the Boston Museum of Fine Arts at the company's new New York headquarters. Other artists in this exhibition included Robert Indiana, Louise Nevelson and Andy Warhol. Similarly, from May 16-June 10, 1967, Daphnis' work was exhibited in dialogue with Nicholas Krushenick's in "Paintings/Collages Krushenick/Daphnis" at the Franklin Siden Gallery in Detroit.

In his later years, Daphnis also exhibited at the Eaton/Schoen Gallery in San Francisco and the Anita Shapolsky Gallery in New York. From May 6-July 4, 2008, Anita Shapolsky Gallery's "Masters of Abstraction" included work by Daphnis along with Seymour Boardman, Grace Hartigan, Joan Mitchell and Aaron Siskind.

In August 2015, Richard Taittinger Gallery announced its exclusive representation of the Estate of Nassos Daphnis. Daphnis received his first solo exhibition at the gallery, Pixel Fields, from September 17-October 24, 2015 and his diptych 4-A-78, 4-B-78, 1978 was included in the group exhibition, Ballet Mecanique from January 16-February 20, 2016. Reviewing Ballet Mecanique for Whitewall Magazine, Emory Loppicolo discussed with the gallery how Daphnis' work could be contemplated in dialogue with Mario Merz's work from the 1970s and 1980s: "Merz and Daphnis were both iconic masters of the 20th century and both had first-hand experience with wartime. Their contact with World War II affected their artistic practice and theoretical perspectives, since machines played a critical role. Meanwhile, the younger generation’s concern with process, format and the relationship to industrial mediums can act as a continuity to Merz and Daphnis’ achievements."

== City Walls, Inc. ==
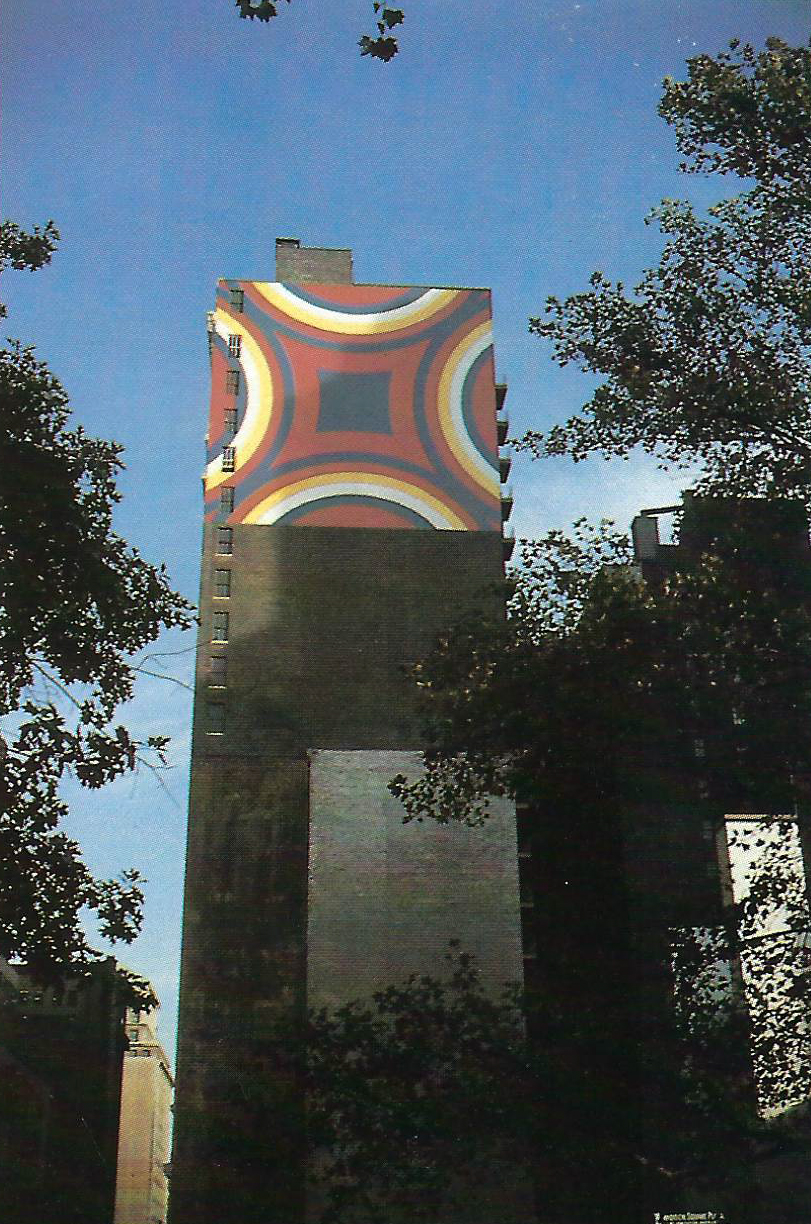
Nassos Daphnis 'City Walls' 26th and Madison Ave. 1969

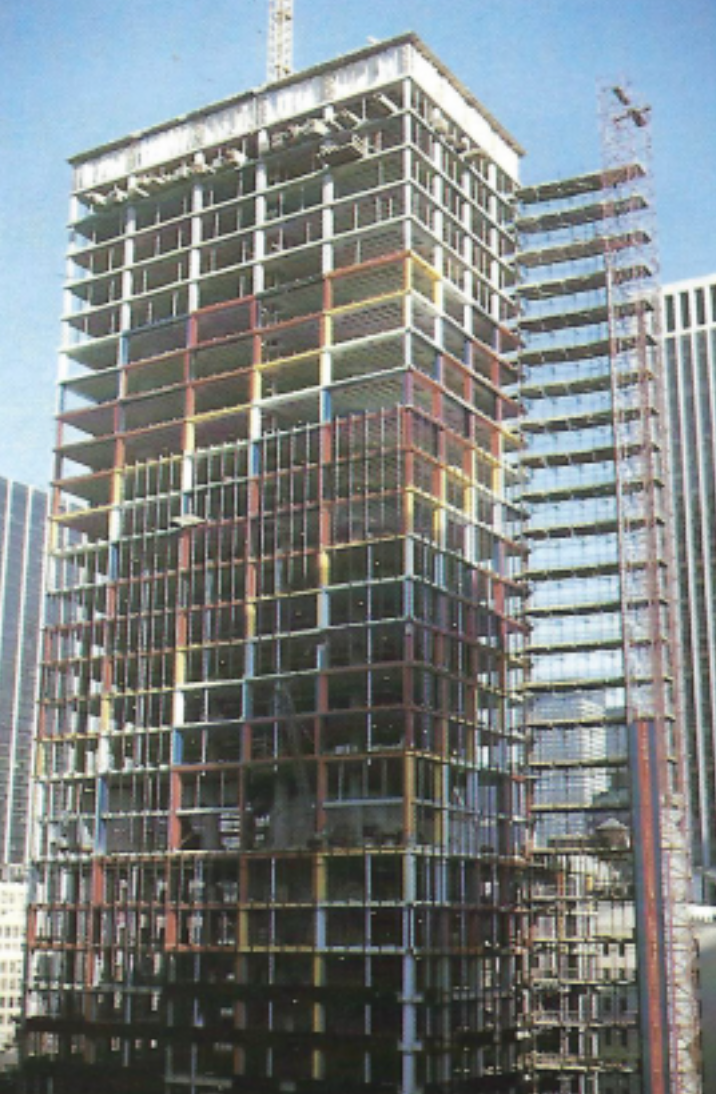
Nassos Daphnis 'City Walls' at the Arlen Building, 43rd Street and Broadway

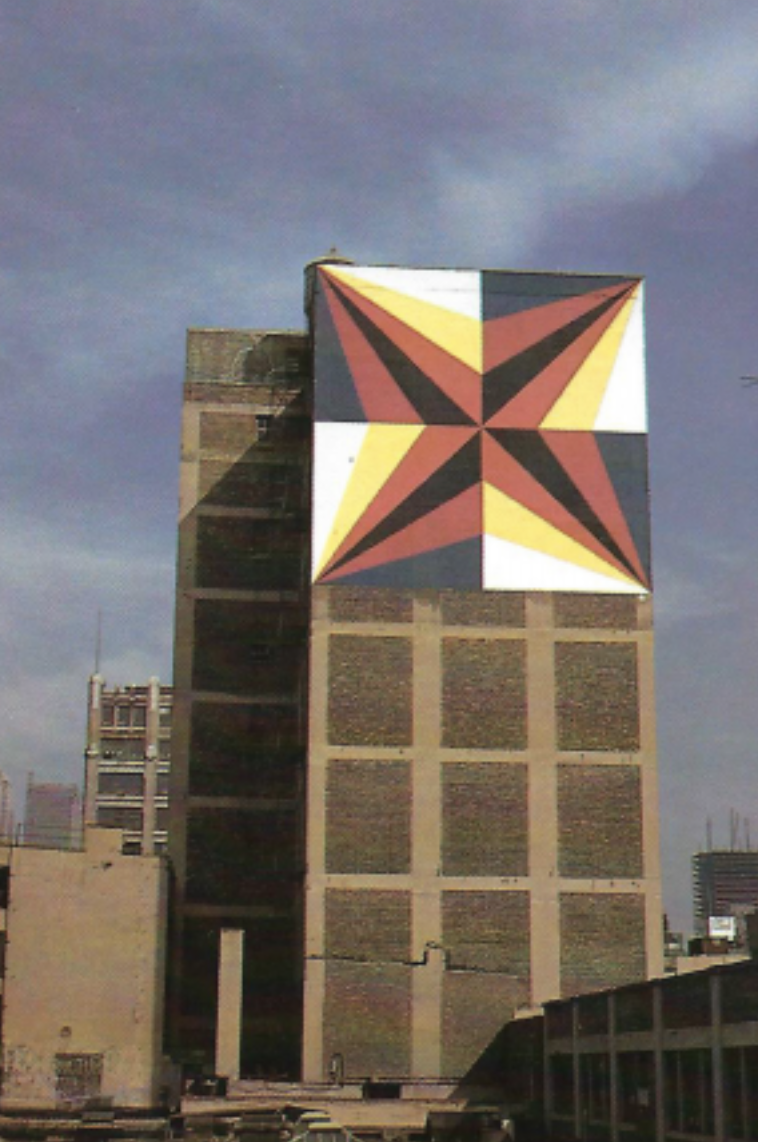
Nassos Daphnis 'City Walls' 47th Street and Westside

In 1969, Daphnis was commissioned by City Walls. Incorporated to do a wall painting at 26th Street and Madison Avenue in New York City In 1971, he was commissioned again to do a wall painting at West Side Highway and 47th Street in New York. From 1971 to 1980, City Walls, Inc. installed public murals in New York City. Neither of Daphnis' murals remains today.

== Death ==
Daphnis died on November 23, 2010 in Provincetown, Massachusetts.

== Public collections ==
Today Daphnis' work is in the collections of many significant public art institutions. These include:

- Akron Art Museum, Akron, OH
- Albright-Knox Art Gallery, Buffalo, NY
- Baltimore Museum, Baltimore, MD
- Boca Raton Museum of Art
- Brooklyn Museum, New York
- Butler Institute of American Art, Youngstown, OH
- Carnegie Museum of Art, Pittsburgh, PA
- The Governor Nelson A. Rockefeller Empire State Plaza Art Collection, Albany, NY
- Everson Museum of Art in Syracuse, New York
- Guggenheim Museum, New York
- Hirshhorn Museum and Sculpture Garden, Washington, D.C.
- Jewish Museum of Florida
- Lowe Art Museum, University of Miami, Coral Gables, FL
- Macedonian Museum of Contemporary Art, Thessaloniki, Greece
- The Metropolitan Museum of Art, New York
- Museum of Modern Art, New York
- Provincetown Art Association and Museum, Provincetown, MA
- Reading Public Museum, Reading, PA
- RISD Museum of Art, Providence, RI
- Seattle Art Museum, Seattle, WA
- University of Michigan Museum of Art, Ann Arbor, MI
- Utah Museum of Fine Arts, Salt Lake City, UT
- Walker Art Center, Minneapolis, MN
- Whitney Museum of American Art, New York

== Honors and awards ==
- Arts Achievement Award, Queens Museum Art, New York (1999)
- Richard A. Florsheim Art Fund Award, U.S.A. (1992)
- The Pollock-Krasner Foundation Award, U.S.A. (1986)
- The Francis J. Greenburger Foundation Award, U.S.A. (1986)
- Guggenheim Fellowship, New York (1977)
- New England 350th Celebration Exhibition, U.S.A. (1972)
- National Endowment of the Arts Grant Award, U.S.A. (1971)
- Boca Raton Museum Award, Boca Raton, FL (1971)
- National Foundation of the Arts and Humanities Award, U.S.A. (1966)
- Pittsburgh Award (1966)
- Ford Foundation Award, U.S.A. (1962)
- Purchase Award: Painting donated to the Whitney Museum of American Art, New York (1962)

== Tree peonies ==
Daphnis' career as a breeder of tree peonies was as prolific as his career as an artist. He created approximately 500 tree peonies and 48 of them were named and registered with the American Tree Peony Society and further propagated. His interest in tree peonies began in 1938 when he met William H. Gratwick of Linwood Gardens, a prominent breeder of tree peonies. Daphnis eventually became partners with Gratwick in the business and art of hybridizing tree peonies, creating many beautiful cultivars and naming them after artists and figures in Greek mythology. In a 1984 interview Daphnis described the beginning of his relationship with the tree peony:

"...In those days (1938), the trip from New York to Pavilion took at least 10 hours. I arrived late in the evening, so it wasn't until the next morning that I had a chance to walk around the grounds. Bill Gratwick and I were strolling down the long driveway when suddenly my breath was taken by the incredible color of rows of tree peonies in full bloom.

I was familiar with all types of cultivated flowers from having worked for seven or eight years in my uncle's flower shop in New York. But in all that time, I had never seen blossoms like these. Fascinated by their beauty, I asked Bill Gratwick what they were. Tree peonies from Japan, he replied, and he began to tell me how he had gotten the plants. Some he had imported from Japan; some he had grown from seed. All were part of a collection of rare plants he was raising at the nursery he then maintained at the Pavilion estate.

...As a painter, my first impulse was to capture the beauty and elegance of these flowers by doing portraits of each variety. At that time, the Gratwicks were growing about 110 varieties of tree peonies, each of which had been selected for the beauty and perfection of its petal arrangement, color, shape, foliage and length of stem. I did paint a few of the varieties, some singly and others in arrangements. This continued for several years, as I came back each spring until 1942, when I was inducted into the Army..."
