= Croceae =

Croceae may refer to:

- Croceae (Laconia), a town in the Laconia region of Ancient Greece
- Croceae (plant), a tribe of plants in the family Iridaceae
