= Lynwood =

Lynwood can refer to:

== Places ==
Australia

- Lynwood, New South Wales
- Lynwood, Western Australia, a suburb of Perth, Western Australia

United States

- Lynwood, California
  - Lynwood Vikings, a Deputy Gang in Los Angeles
- Lynwood, Illinois
- Lynwood, Mississippi
- Lynwood Park, a district of Brookhaven, Georgia, United States
- Lynwood Theatre, a vintage theater and moviehouse in Kitsap County, Washington

== Other uses ==
- Straight Outta Lynwood, 2006 album by Weird Al Yankovic

== See also ==
- Lynnwood (disambiguation)
- Linwood (disambiguation)
- Linnwood (disambiguation)
