= Elliott Linwood =

American conceptual artist (born 1956)

- Born: July 14, 1956 (age 70); Lowell, Massachusetts
- Known for: Photography, Sculpture, Conceptual Art
- Movement: Stand Up Theory

Elliott Linwood (born July 14, 1956) is an American conceptual artist known for his large-scale photo grids and cross-referencing sculptural installations. He is based in San Diego, California.

== Early life, career and education ==
Linwood was born July 14, 1956, in Lowell and attended Billerica Memorial High School in Massachusetts before moving to New York City when he was nineteen. He came out as a gay man just before the AIDS epidemic struck. Testing positive for the HIV virus in the early 1980s led him to a life of activism around this condition. Linwood worked in the field of electronic publishing most of his life. He earned dual bachelor's degrees in sociocultural anthropology and philosophy from New York University (NYU) in 1982, then attended the University of Chicago through 1983. He earned dual master's degrees in Arts and Education from San Francisco State University's (SFSU) Interdisciplinary Arts Program in 1993. He attended New College School of Law in San Francisco through a state-funded HIV empowerment grant, and became a California attorney in 2002.

== Influences ==
Linwood was influenced by the work of Christine Tamblyn, a feminist media artist and critic, who was Linwood's instructor and mentor at SFSU. Tamblyn studied under Allan Kaprow, the originator of Happenings and Life Art, at the University of California San Diego. Through Tamblyn's tutelage Linwood learned about the performative aspects of Life Art. In a 1991 interview with her Linwood wrote, "In her role as art instructor, Christine Tamblyn teaches that happenings, process-oriented conceptual art, body art, feminist art, persona art, even documentation art . . . can all be considered 'Life Art." At NYU Linwood was also introduced to works of anthropologist Gregory Bateson which analyzed rituals using cybernetics and systems theory models. These ideas, combined with his practical knowledge of computer programming and design of index and list publications, informed his art practice.

Film director Dereck Jarman's movie Blue, also influenced work that Linwood presented in "Share Your Vision," for which he won first place and an award. This outreach exhibition was organized to raise awareness about CMV retinitis, a preventable condition that causes blindness in people with compromised immune systems. Organized by Visual AIDS and Roche Pharmaceuticals, the show was presented at Artists Space in New York City in 2003. An homage to Jarman's film (consisting entirely of a blue lit movie screen with dialog of the artist visiting doctors about his loss of sight) appears in Linwood's Halos, which reads as blurred silhouettes like dark pupils immersed in a field of iris blue light.

== Teaching ==
Linwood developed core graduate curricula in Life Art which he taught at SFSU. These seminars explored conceptual and de-materialized art forms, and ephemera (printed matter, video, digital communication, etc.) generated around performance spectacles, as documentary records, which might then be commodified.

== Cultural criticism ==
Linwood wrote for High Performance Magazine in Los Angeles, and the Bay Area Reporter, The Sentinel and PhotoMetro in San Francisco from 1990 to 1994. Some of the writers and artists Linwood wrote about include Christine Tamblyn, Nao Bustamante, Sheree Rose, Millie Wilson, Carrie Mae Weems, Diamanda Gallas, The Theory Girls, Jerome Caja, Cliff Hengst, Paul Monette, Sapphire, Dodie Bellamy, Kevin Killian, Justin Chin, The Hittite Empire, Joe Goode and others.

== "Stand Up Theory" ==
Describing the phenomenon of witnessing several prominent Bay Area theorists using body art and other types of performance to demonstrate the gaps between subcultural concerns and dominant cultural assumptions, Linwood coined the term "Stand Up Theory" to highlight how these performance artists highjacked the mic to seduce, ambush, and educate their audiences. Linwood's sculptural works deploy these strategies. Of Initiation, a sculpture referencing AIDS and made of honey, Tamblyn wrote, "The piece adroitly expressed the melancholic sensibility that the disease evokes by capitalizing on honey's association with seduction, entrapment and preservation."

== Photo grids & cross-referencing installations ==
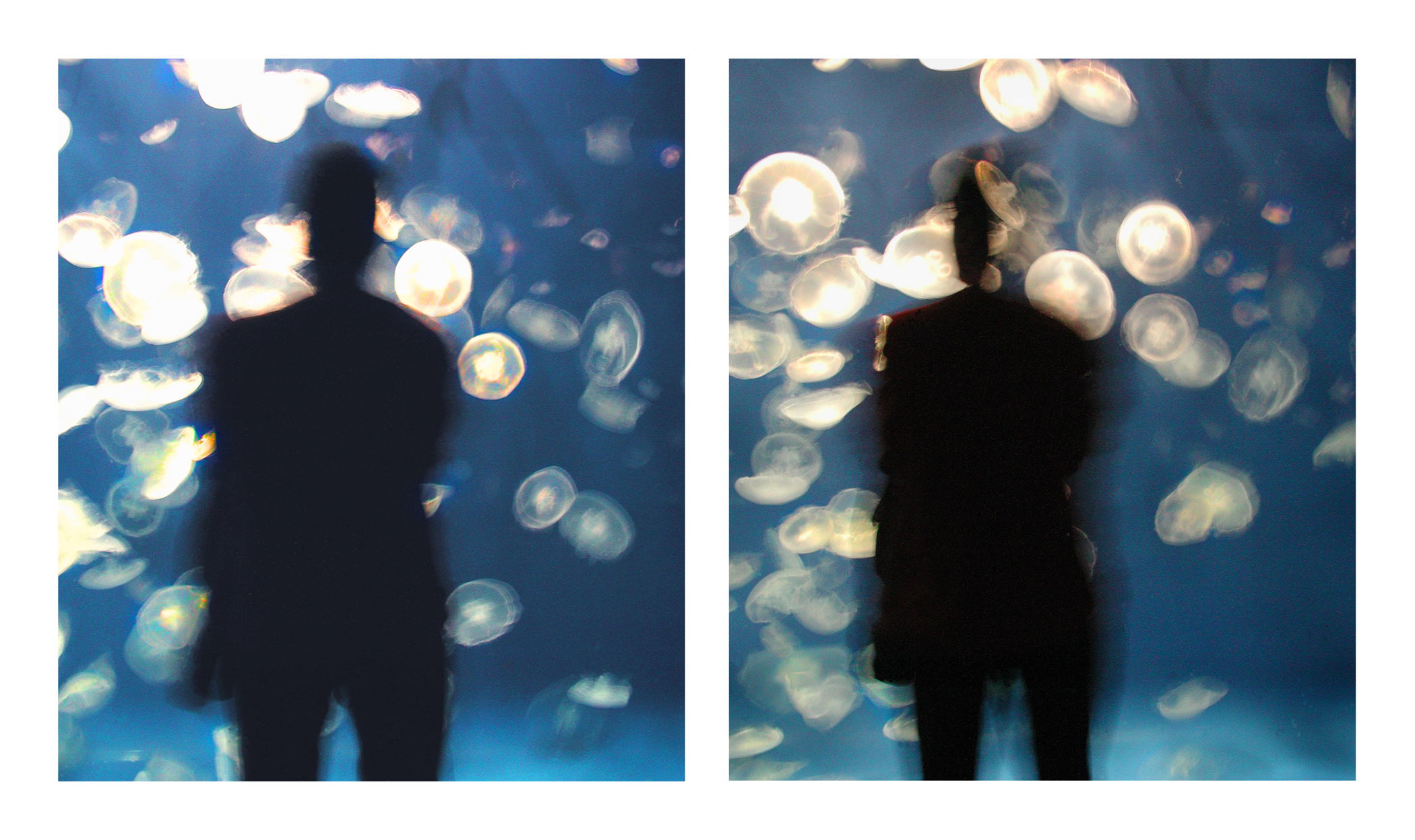
Elliott Linwood's Halos, part of an exhibition Share Your Vision, 2003

Linwood is best known for his large-scale photo grids composed of original and found images culled from the environment, the Internet, cult movies and magazine ads. His cross-referencing installations are similarly made up of found and fabricated objects. Both bodies of work share similar characteristics, such as a non-linear viewpoint and an indexical relationship between the images and objects presented, which in turn point to things outside their framing device. His sculptures, Initiation, and Resistance, and his projection Citizen Pan, were displayed in A Living Testament of the Blood Fairies at Artists Space in New York in 1997, an exhibition that Frank Moore curated around text-based work.

== Reception ==
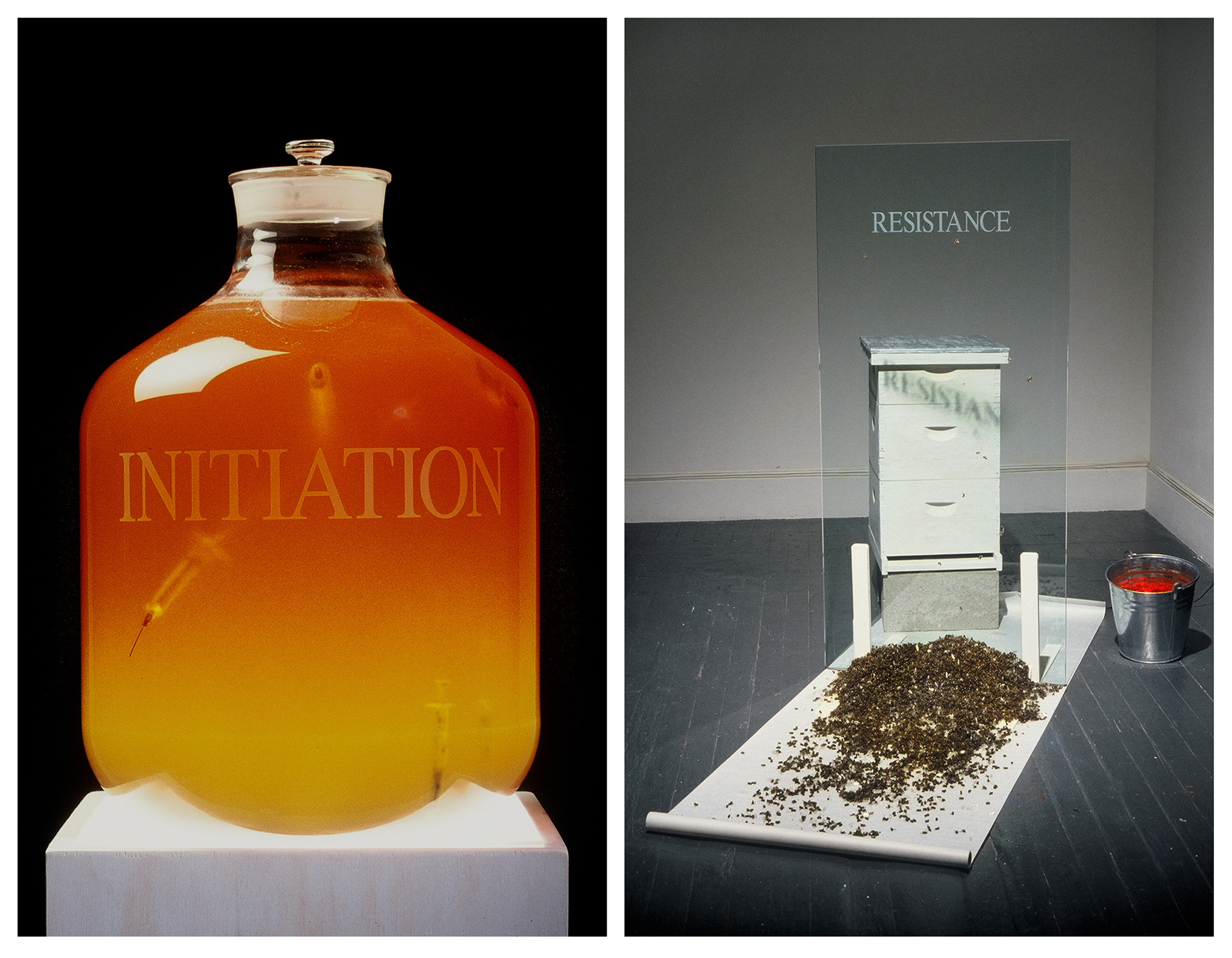
Elliott Linwood, 1993. Left: "Initiation," Right: "Resistance," part of an A Living Testament of the Blood Fairies, 1996

Holland Cotter in the April 1997 Art in America wrote of the exhibition: "The bittersweet tone was set [by] pieces by Elliott Linwood which opened the show. One was a slide projection of words from Sir J.M. Barrie's Peter Pan: 'When the first baby laughed for the first time, the laugh broke into a thousand pieces and spread over the entire world, and that was the beginning of fairies. But all the fairies are dying now because children know such a lot they don't believe or laugh anymore.'" Bill Arning, in the December 10, 1996 Village Voice also wrote about Linwood's work in the exhibition, "This synthesis of queer politics, camp humour, dark children's stories, and magic sets us up for a different kind of AIDS show than New York has seen before."

== Awards ==
- 1994, California Arts Council Fellowship, Sacramento, CA
- 1994, John Caldwell Award for Excellence administered by Visual AID, San Francisco, CA
- 1996, Art Matter Grant and Artists Space Grant, New York, NY
- 2003, Share Your Vision Award presented by Visual AIDS and funded by Roche Pharmaceuticals, New York, NY
