= Linwood, Carroll County, Maryland =

Unincorporated community in Maryland, U.S.

Coordinates: 39°33′48″N 77°08′34″W

Linwood is an unincorporated community in Carroll County, Maryland, United States. The community is home to the Linwood Historic District, which was added to the National Register of Historic Places in 1980.
