= Christine Tamblyn =

- Born: July 12, 1951; Waukegan, Illinois, U.S.
- Died: January 1, 1998 (aged 46); San Francisco, California, U.S.
- Occupations: artist, writer

Christine Tamblyn (July 12, 1951 – January 1, 1998) was an American feminist media artist, critic, and educator.

== Early life and education ==
Tamblyn was born in 1951 in Waukegan, Illinois, and attended a Catholic girls' school in Mundelein, Carmel High School for Girls. She was very shy as a child and never learned to ride a bike or drive a car. She moved to Chicago in 1968 or 1969 and began to audit courses at the University of Chicago while working as an administrative assistant for an insurance company. Around 1973 she began undergraduate studies at the School of the Art Institute of Chicago, where she focused on video and performance because of what she saw as their links to everyday life. Her aesthetic in this period was deeply influenced by the work of Allan Kaprow and the Happenings of the late 1950s and early 1960s, as well as by the Chicago Imagist school of videomakers, which included her teacher Phil Morton. She taught graduate-level courses in video while still an undergraduate.

On graduating from SAIC in 1979, Tamblyn moved to New York and pursued her performance work in East Village spaces. This was a difficult time in her life as she lacked access to the advanced equipment she needed to produce her work. She taught for a while at the School of Visual Arts and held some clerical jobs. By the early 1980s, Tamblyn had become increasingly involved in curatorial work. She decided to go to graduate school at the University of California, San Diego, where she was able to study with Kaprow as well as with the conceptual and performance artists Eleanor Antin and David Antin. She received her M.F.A. degree in 1986.

Throughout the early 1990s, Tamblyn was a faculty at San Francisco State University, and in 1994 she was hired as an assistant professor at Florida International University, Miami. Two years later, she took up an assistant professorship in the Department of Studio Art at the University of California, Irvine, where she began to lay the foundation of the department's digital arts curriculum.

A few months before her death, Tamblyn moved back to San Francisco. She died there of breast cancer on New Year's Day 1998. Her archive is held by the University of California, Irvine.

== Art career and teaching ==
As a visual artist, Tamblyn worked in performance and new media and was in the forefront of those experimenting with video and computer technologies for the creation of conceptual art. Indeed, along with artists such as Timothy Binkley, Tamblyn argued that the emergence of computer art represented the apogee of the 20th century's conceptual art movement. Many of Tamblyn's works were autobiographically inflected, including the CD-ROM projects She Loves It, She Loves It Not: Women and Technology (1993), Mistaken Identities (1995)—both of which have been shown widely—and the posthumous Archival Quality (1998). By including personal materials such as childhood journals, Tamblyn underlined the fact that interactive media do not provide a space of absolute freedom for the viewer but instead offer a structure that complexly links viewer to artist. Tamblyn's work was exhibited during her lifetime at the Institute of Contemporary Arts (London), Pacific Film Archives (California), San Francisco Exploratorium, Wexner Center for Contemporary Art (Ohio); Walter Phillips Gallery in the Banff Centre (Canada), and numerous other international venues.

Tamblyn liked to work with other artists, and She Loves It, She Loves It Not was a collaboration with two of her SFSU students, Marjorie Franklin and Paul Tompkins. An interactive multimedia essay that channels contradictory attitudes towards technology in art, it was both an alternative kind of artist's book and one of the first CD-ROMs created and produced by a woman artist.

Tamblyn's second CD-ROM, Mistaken Identities, which set up comparisons between the life stories of ten prominent women, won a number of awards, including Finalist Award at the 1996 New York Exposition of Short Film and Video, an Honorable Mention in the 1996 "New Voices, New Visions" contest sponsored by Wired magazine, and First Prize in the 1997 International Festival of the Image in Colombia. In 1997 Tamblyn was commissioned by the National Endowment for the Arts to produce a new CD-ROM, Archival Quality. This catalogue of her own writing and experience was nearly complete when she died and was finished by friends and colleagues.

In the 1980s, Tamblyn began working with feminist performance artists. In 1984 she was invited by the Los Angeles Woman's Building to create As the Worm Turns, a work that challenged the anti-pornography position held by some feminists. Some of her later writing similarly upholds the ways that sexually explicit imagery can serve as an antidote to certain idealized and prescriptive versions of female sexuality.

In 1984 Tamblyn moved to San Francisco and began teaching at San Francisco State University as lecturer and coordinator of their graduate program, a position she held until 1996. Over the next few years, she also taught for short periods at the San Francisco Art Institute (1988-1990), University of California, Santa Cruz (1989), Mills College (1990), and the University of California, Berkeley (1990-1993), where she was a visiting assistant professor.

While living in the Bay Area, she wrote for several major art publications, including Artweek (as contributing editor), Cinematograph (as editor), and Art News (as correspondent). By this point she had been writing art criticism and exhibition catalogs for most of a decade and had already served as the video and performance editor for the New Art Examiner journal from 1977 to 1979. Tamblyn was a prolific critic, going on to write dozens of reviews and a number of essays for Afterimage, High Performance, and Leonardo in addition to the above publications. Her writing often addressed issues of gender exclusion in new media, censorship of artists, and declining arts funding. She was known for producing finished articles from a first draft, without the need for revisions, an ability she attributed to her lifelong habit of daily journal writing. Twice, in 1987 and 1990, her writing was recognized by the John McCarron Art Writing Award from Artspace in San Francisco.

== Selected publications ==
- "Remote Control: The Electronic Transference." Processed Lives: Gender and Technology in Everyday Life. M. Calvert and J. Terry, eds. 1997.
- "The Hair of the Dog That Bit Us." New Feminist Criticism: Art, Identity, Action. 1994.
- "Real Grumblings and Pseudo-Science: A Holo-Grammatological Augmentation." For a Burning World Is Come to Dance Inane: Essays by and about Jim Pomeroy. 1993.
- "Boys Club, Craft Hut, Carnival or Cyberspace?: The San Francisco Art Scene." High Performance. 1993.
- "Endangered Species." Chimaera. 1992. (on Lynn Hershman Leeson)
- "No More Nice Girls: Recent Transgressive Feminist Art." Art Journal. 1991.
- "The River of Swill: Feminist Art, Sexual Codes, and Censorship." Afterimage. 1990.
- "Significant Others: Social Documentary as Personal Portraiture in Women's Video of the '80s." Illuminating Video: an Essential Guide to Video Art. Aperture Press, 1990.
- "Computer Art as Conceptual Art," Art Journal 49:3. 1990.
- "Spectacular Visions: Video Art." Yesterday and Tomorrow: California Women Artists. Midmarch Press, 1989.
- "Cybernetic Technologies: Neither Utopian Templates nor Dystopian Harbingers." Techno/logical Imagination: Machines in the Garden of Art. 1989.
