= Lynnwood, Virginia =

Lynnwood is the name of two places in the State of Virginia in the United States of America:

- Lynnwood, Rockingham County, Virginia
- Lynnwood, Virginia Beach, Virginia
