= Linwood, Howard County, Maryland =

Unincorporated community in Maryland, U.S.

Coordinates: 39°16′38″N 76°48′19″W

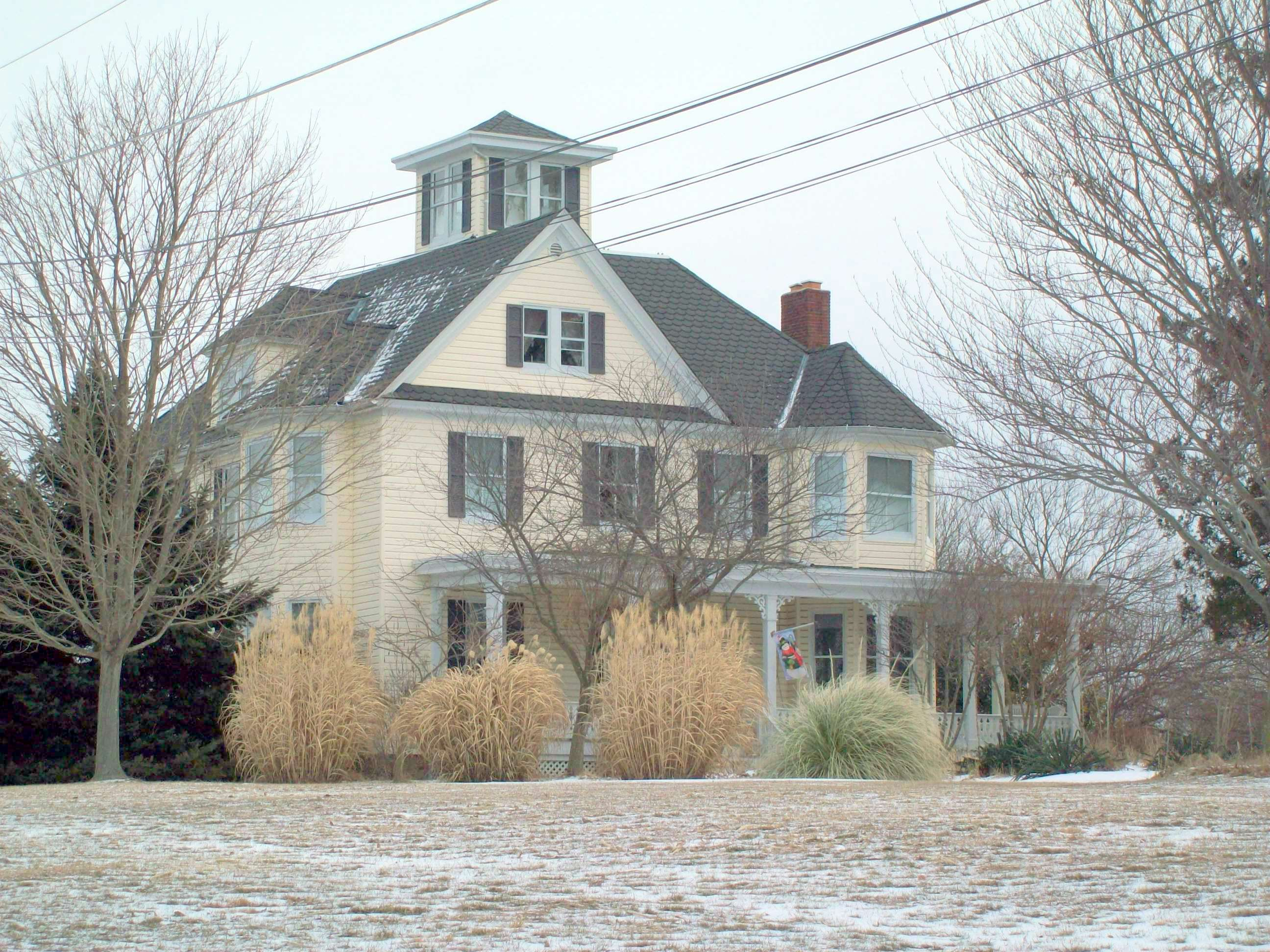
Linwood Manor in 2011

Linwood is an unincorporated community in Howard County, Maryland, United States.

== See also ==
- Linwood Center
