= Lynnwood, Pennsylvania =

Lynnwood is the name of three places in the State of Pennsylvania in the United States of America:

- Lynnwood, Fayette County, Pennsylvania
- Lynnwood, Luzerne County, Pennsylvania
- a portion of the census-designated place of Lynnwood-Pricedale, Pennsylvania in Westmoreland County
