= Linwood Lake =

Linwood Lake may refer to:

- Linwood Lake (Anoka County, Minnesota), US, a lake
- Linwood Lake, St. Louis County, Minnesota, US, an unorganized territory
