= Linnwood (Ellicott City, Maryland) =

Historic house in Maryland, United States

- U.S. National Register of Historic Places
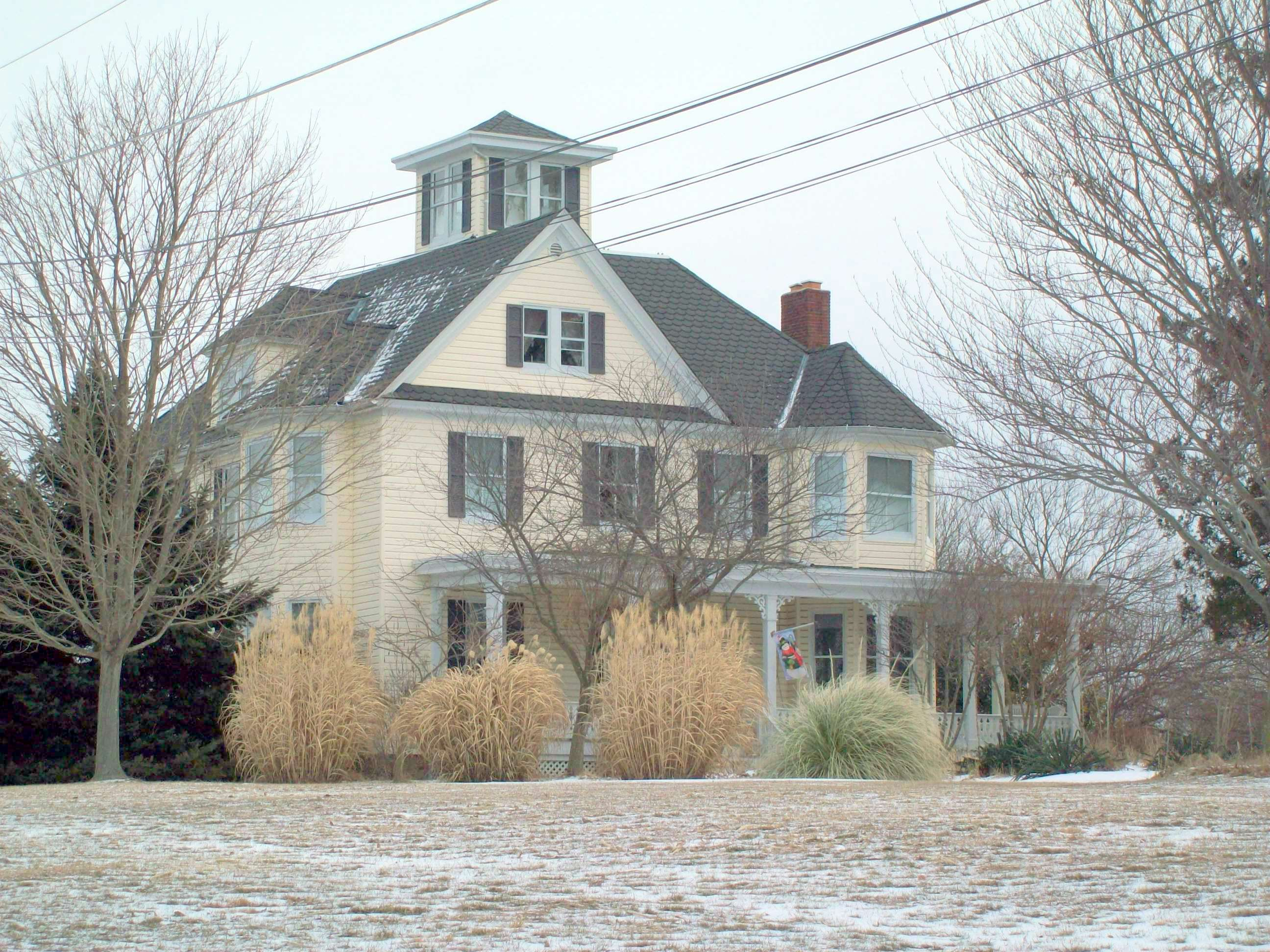
- Linnwood, January 2011

- Location within Maryland Location within the United States
- Location: 2327 Daniels Rd., Ellicott City, Maryland
- Coordinates: 39°18′27″N 76°48′23″W
- Area: 1.7 acres (0.69 ha)
- Built: 1901
- Architect: Hopkins, D.S.
- Architectural style: Queen Anne
- NRHP reference No.: 06001126
- Added to NRHP: December 12, 2006

Linnwood, is a historic home located at Ellicott City, Howard County, Maryland, United States. It is a large 1901 Queen Anne-influenced house consisting of a 2 1/2-story four-bay by four-bay frame structure with vinyl siding, a rubble stone foundation, and a hip roof with asphalt shingles. Six domestic outbuildings are arrayed behind the house, including a springhouse/greenhouse, shop building/cold storage and annex, garage, smokehouse, privy, and a modern garage. A stone gateway with iron gates is located at the road, flanking the driveway. The house's Late Victorian form and appearance resulted from a thorough remodeling in 1901 of a preexisting farmhouse, according to designs by architect D. S. Hopkins.

Linnwood was listed on the National Register of Historic Places in 2006.
