= Mary Linwood =

British artist (1755–1845)

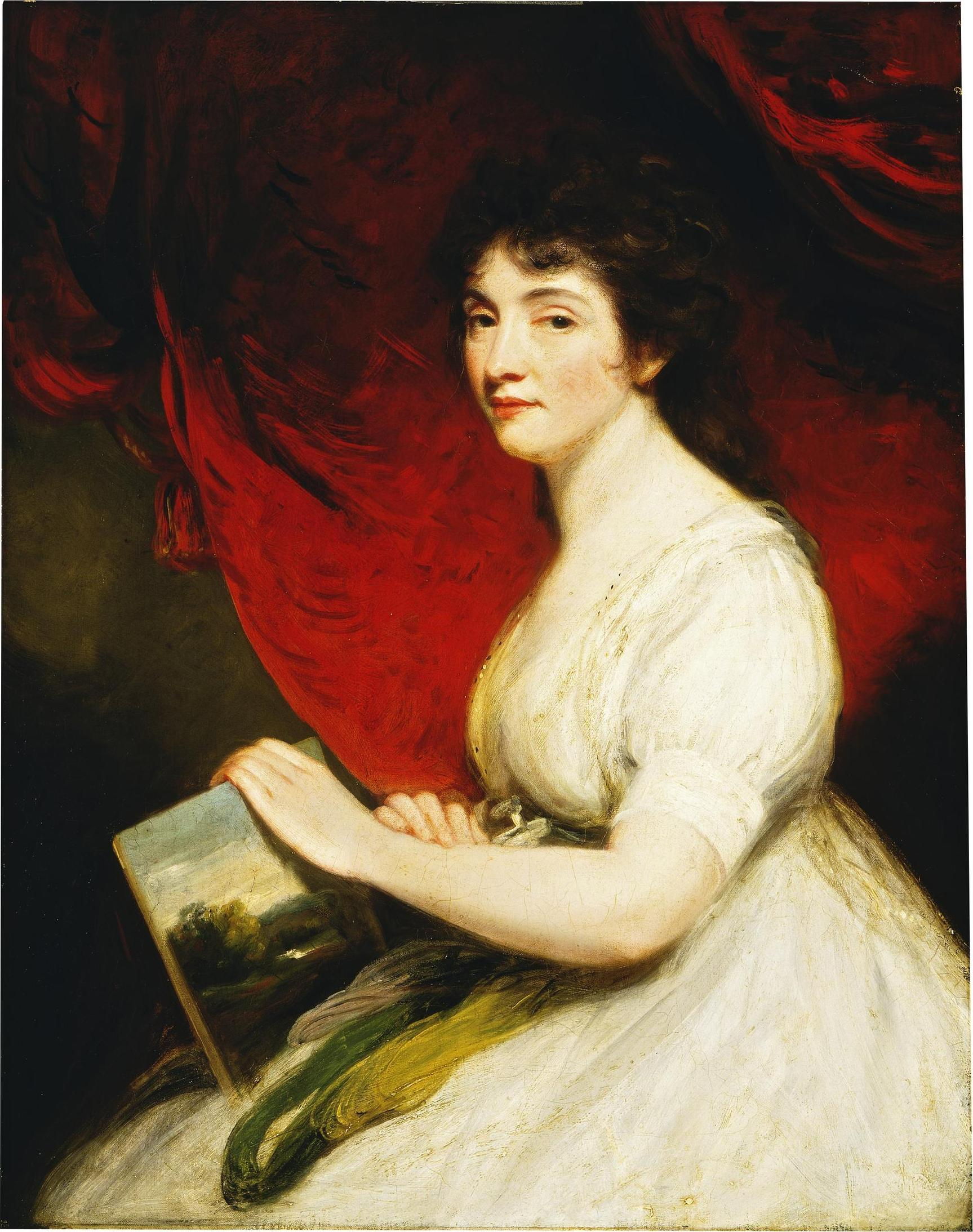
- Mary Linwood, oil on canvas, c. 1800, John Hoppner
- Born: 1755; Birmingham, England
- Died: 1845 (aged 89–90); London, England
- Occupations: Needle woman, school mistress

Mary Linwood (1755–1845) was an English needle woman who exhibited her worsted embroidery or crewel embroidery in Leicester and London and was the school mistress of a private school. In the 20th century, Mary Linwood Comprehensive School was named in her honour. In 1790, she received a medal from the Society of Arts.

== Biography ==
=== Early life ===
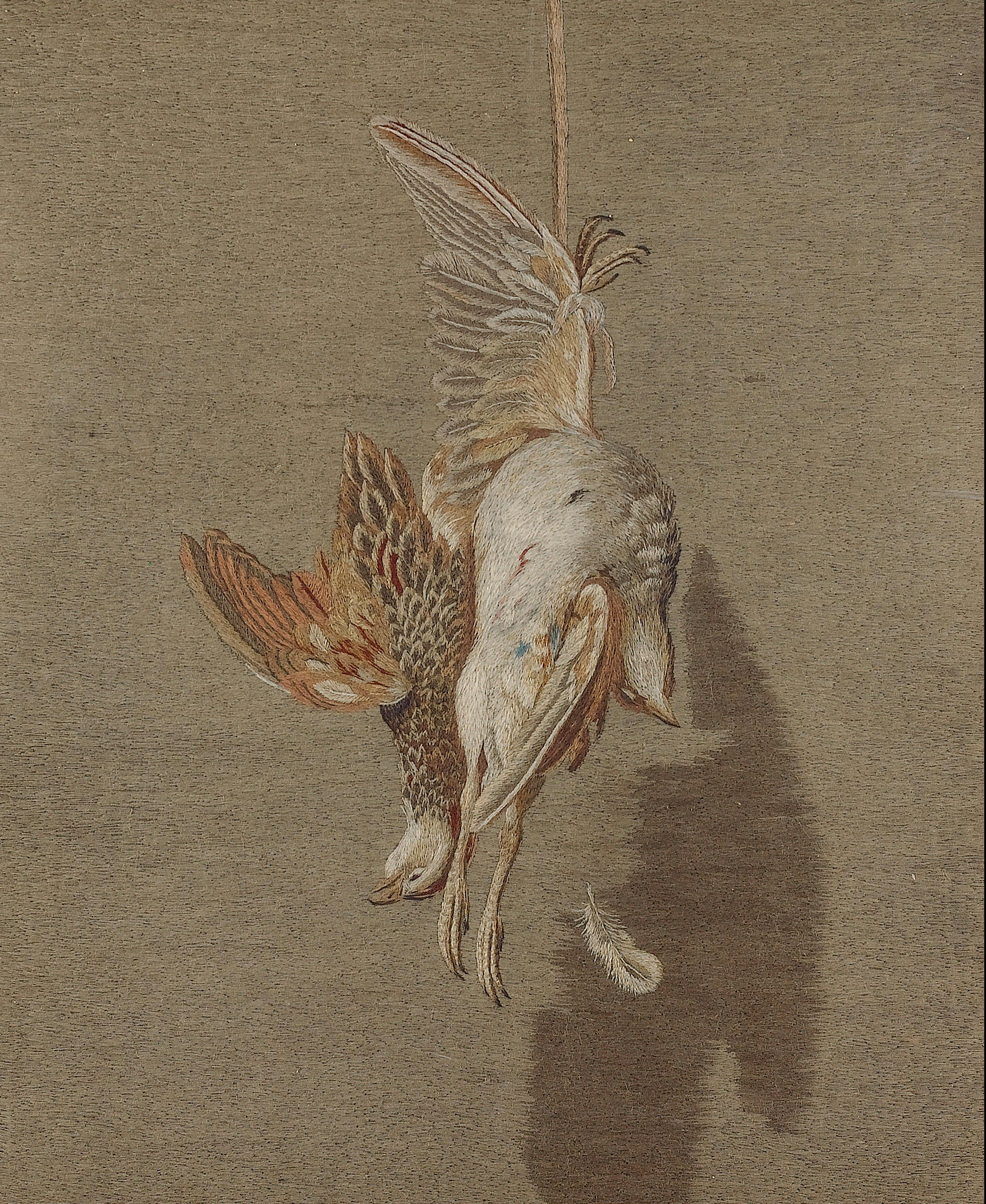
Hanging Partridge

Born in Birmingham in 1755, Mary Linwood moved to Leicester in 1764 with her family after her father, a wine merchant, became bankrupt. He died young, and her mother opened a private boarding school for young ladies in Belgrave Gate. When her mother died, Linwood took over the school and continued it for 50 years. Linwood made her first embroidered picture when she was thirteen years old, and by 1775 she had established herself as a needlework artist. By the age of 31, Mary had attracted the attention of the royal family, and she was invited to Windsor Castle by Queen Charlotte along with Mary Delaney and Mary Knowles whom the queen also engaged with to show their work.

=== Exhibitions ===
For nearly seventy-five years, she worked in worsted embroidery, producing a collection of over 100 pictures that specialised in full size copies of old masters. She opened an exhibition in the Hanover Square Rooms in 1798, which afterward travelled to Leicester Square, Edinburgh and Dublin. Linwood's copies of old master paintings in crewel wool (named from the crewel or worsted wool used), in which the irregular and sloping stitches resembled brushwork, achieved great fame from the time of her first London exhibition in 1787. She met most of the crowned heads of Europe. She exhibited in Russia and Catherine the Great offered £40,000 for the whole collection while the Tsar offered her £3,000 for one example. However, Linwood refused as she wished her work to remain in England. On one occasion her copy of a painting by the Italian artist Salvator Rosa (1615–1673) sold for more than the original. One of her own designs, the Judgement of Cain, took ten years to complete.

Her exhibition in Leicester Square, London, was the first art show to be illuminated by gaslight and innovative theatrical displays with red, silver and gold curtaining and one where it looked like peeping into a cottage window. The exhibition consisted of copies of paintings after such masters as Carlo Dolci, Guido, Ruisdael, Opie, Morland, Gainsborough and Reynolds. Linwood's subjects also included Lady Jane Grey and Napoleon, whose portrait was said to have been done from life. He conferred on her the Freedom of Paris in 1803. So successful was Linwood in these annual shows attracting 40,000 customers a year, similar to Madame Tussauds, that she was able to commission John Hoppner (1758–1810) to paint her portrait. By this time Hoppner was principal painter to the Prince of Wales (later George IV) and the most important portraitist in England.Ladies Monthly Review spoke of its "variety and graduation of tints cannot possibly exceeds in effort by the pencil."

John Constable's (1776–1837) first commissioned work was to paint the background details in one of her works. Linwood is said to have refused an offer of 3000 guineas for her version of Carlo Dolci's Salvator Mundi, and instead bequeathed it to Queen Victoria. The needle work pictures continued to be exhibited in Leicester Square in London continuously until her death in 1845.

Charles Dickens mentions her in "A Plated Article", his description of a visit to Staffordshire, to be found in Reprinted Pieces: "Shade of Miss Linwood, erst of Leicester Square, London, thou art welcome here, and thy retreat is fitly chosen! I myself was one of the last visitors to that awful storehouse of thy life's work, where an anchorite old man and woman took my shilling with a solemn wonder, and conducting me to a gloomy sepulchre of needlework dropping to pieces with dust and age and shrouded in twilight at high noon, left me there, chilled, frightened and alone. And now, in ghostly letters on all the dead walls of this dead town, I read thy honoured name, and find that thy Last Supper, worked in Berlin Wool, invites inspection as a powerful excitement!"

Credited as the most notable needlepainter of the eighteenth and nineteenth centuries, along with Mary Knowles and Anne Eliza Morritt, and perhaps as few works survive of Mary Delany, embroidery historians unfailingly list Linwood as the artist who inspired the practice of Berlin wool work, today known as needlepoint. Linwood's exhibitions were contemporaneous with the rising popularity of Berlin wool work, until the Royal School of Needlework and the Arts and Crafts movement began to criticize Berlin wool work for having led to a loss of embroidery skills, and in later decades Linwood's notoriety was put in question due to its association with Berlin wool work.

=== Legal dispute ===
Linwood's needlework exhibition was housed in the old Savile House on Leicester Square, which also housed William Green's Pistol Repository and Shooting Gallery from 1836 to 1855 in a rebuilt section upstairs. The run-down building had been leased to Mary Linwood and associates at the turn of the century. It was subsequently rebuilt and refurbished from 1806 to 1809 by architect Joseph Page (1718–1776). Linwood displayed her work in a long gallery on the first floor from 1809 until her death in 1845. A legal dispute regarding the payment for renovations became a decades long battle, and eventually landed in The House of Lords in 1837. The House decided the case against Linwood and her partners, who were ordered to pay Page. In 1865, Savile House was destroyed by fire.

=== Family ===
Mary is often confused with her niece Mary Linwood, born circa 1783 in Birmingham, a composer whose works include the oratorio David’s First Victory (1833) and the author of Leicestershire Tales (1808), and the poem Anglo Cambrian (1818).

=== Last years and death ===
Four years before her death in 1845, Mary's works were still exhibited in London. She worked with stitches of different lengths on a fabric made especially for her in Leicester, and had coarse linen tammy cloth prepared for her as well. Her long and short stitches looked like brush strokes, with silk for highlights. She inspired many amateurs in later years to copy her needlework techniques on a smaller scale.

She embroidered her last piece when she was seventy-eight, although she lived to be ninety and worked as a school mistress until a year before her death. She never married and, according to the Greater Wigston Historical Society, was the last person in Leicester to use a Sedan chair. In 1845, during her annual visit to her Exhibition in London, Mary Linwood, by then regarded as the most celebrated needlewoman of her age, caught the flu and died. She was buried in St Margaret's Church, Leicester, a church she regularly attended.

Her entire collection was dispersed at Christie's Auction House, after both the British Museum and House of Lords had earlier rejected her offer to donate her collection, the auctioned pieces were sold for sums far below those at which they had been valued a few years previously.

Her tomb in Leicester, erected by friends refers to her skills adding a "lustre on her age, her country and her sex.

An exhibition "Mary Linwood: Art, Stitch & Life" was displayed at Leicester Museum & Art Gallery, 13 September 2025 - 22 February 2026.
