= Linwood Pendleton =

American economist

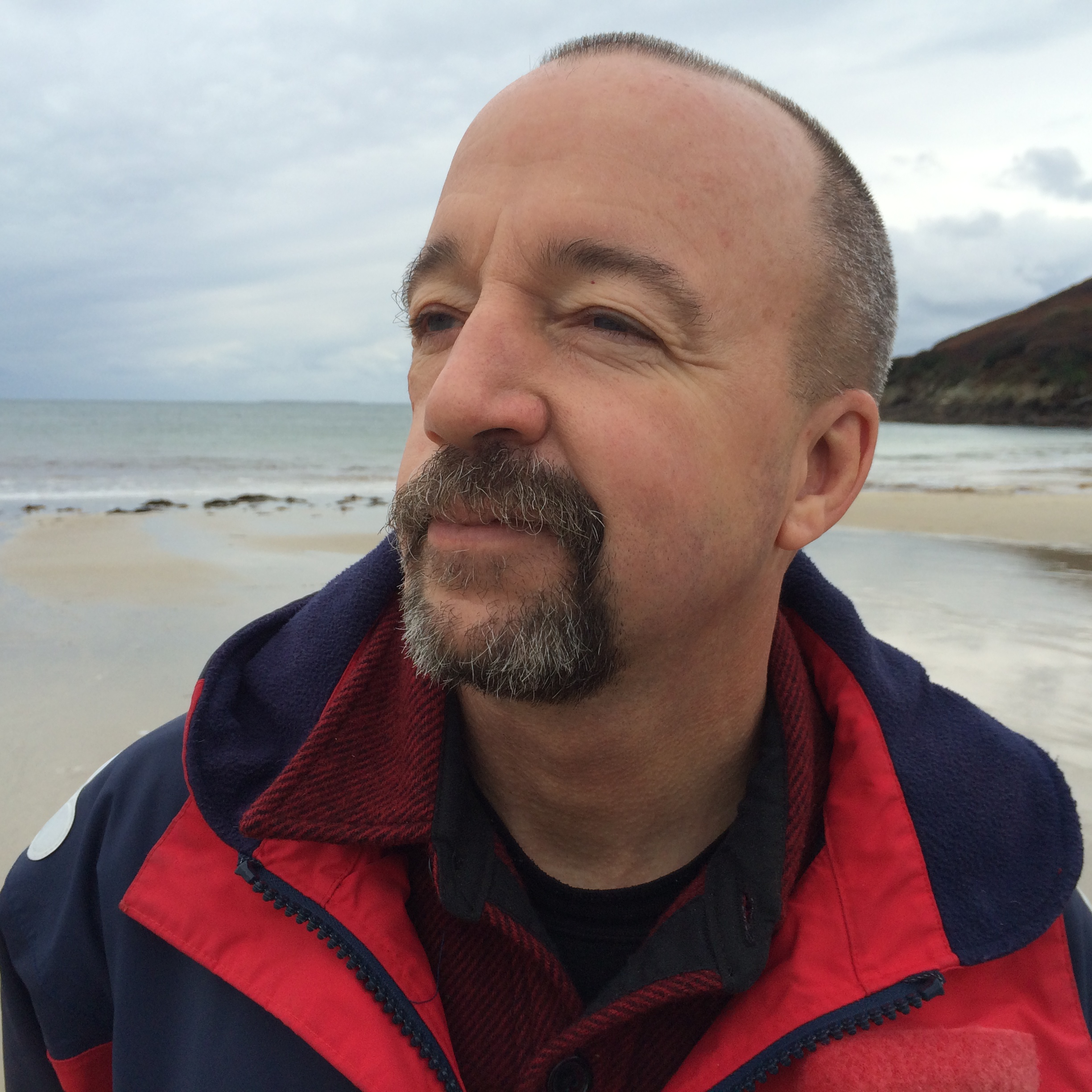
- Born: July 20, 1964 (age 62); Richmond, Virginia

Academic background
- Education: Yale University; Harvard University; Princeton University; College of William & Mary

Academic work
- Discipline: Environmental economics
- Institutions: C4IR Ocean Centre for the Law and Economics of the Sea (AMURE) at the European Institute for Marine Studies (IUEM - University of Western Brittany) Laboratory of Excellence (Brest, France) Duke University Nicholas Institute for Environmental Policy Solutions
- Awards: Switzer Environmental Leadership Fellow David Nahai Award for Research Excellence in Water Quality (2006)

Linwood Pendleton (born July 20, 1964), a Franco-American environmental economist, is the Executive Director of the Ocean Knowledge Action Network and formerly the Senior Vice-President for Science at the Centre for the 4th Industrial Revolution. Previously, he was the World Wildlife Fund (WWF) Global Oceans Lead Scientist. Since October 2014, Pendleton has served as International Chair in Marine Ecosystem Services at the Laboratory of Excellence and European Institute for Marine Studies (IUEM - University of Western Brittany). He is also a senior fellow at Duke's Nicholas Institute for Environmental Policy Solutions (NIEPS) and Adjunct Associate Professor at the Duke University Marine Laboratory, part of NIEPS. He previously served as the Director of Ocean and Coastal Policy for the Nicholas Institute (2009-2013) and was the founder of the Marine Ecosystem Services Partnership. Pendleton was the Acting Chief Economist for the National Oceanic and Atmospheric Administration (NOAA) from 2011-2013.

Pendleton has collaborated with conservationists worldwide including at the WWF, The Nature Conservancy, Environmental Defense Fund, NRDC, and he served for nearly ten years on the Board of the Conservation Strategy Fund. He served on the Science Advisory Committee of the Gulf of Maine Research Institute, GEO Blue Planet steering committee, the Blue Carbon Finance Working Group, and the OBIS science advisory committee. Pendleton has served on several government and scholarly advisory boards and committees, including the California Marine Life Protection Act Initiative, as part of the statewide Science Advisory Team and Central Coast Subteam. He currently sits on the Editorial Board of the Journal of Ocean and Coastal Economics (JOCE).

His interests are now on building bottom-up networks to support ocean professionals and scientists working to co-design science for sustainable development.

== Education and Academic Career ==
Pendleton left Lafayette High School after his junior year to start an undergraduate degree at the College of William and Mary where he graduated summa cum laude and a member of the Phi Beta Kappa and Sigma Xi honor societies. In 1986 he started a Ph.D. in Ecology, Evolution, and Behavior at Princeton University where he studied the evolutionary strategies for co-existence two species of caiman in the upper Amazon Basin, in Manu National Park. In 1989 Pendleton left Princeton with a terminal masters degree. He next attended Harvard's Kennedy School of Government where he earned a masters of public administration; his studies included field work in Belize, Nicaragua, and Honduras. His work in Nicaragua led to a chapter on the potential pitfalls of non-timber forestry.

Immediately after graduating from Harvard, Pendleton enrolled in a doctoral degree in Forestry and Environmental Studies from Yale University. He left Yale in 1996 to become the first faculty member hired into the University of Southern California's new Environmental Studies Program, with a primary appointment in Economics. He received his doctoral degree from Yale later that year in the spring of 1997 while finishing his first year as an assistant professor. While at USC, Pendleton transitioned to the School of International Relations and eventually left the university to become an assistant professor of Economics and Finance at the University of Wyoming. In 2004 Pendleton returned to California to become a tenured associate professor in the Environmental Science and Engineering Program at UCLA's School of Public Health.

== Interdisciplinary, Non-Academic Career ==
Pendleton took a one-year leave of absence from UCLA to become the senior fellow and director of economic research at The Ocean Foundation in Washington, D.C., and founder and director of the Coastal Ocean Values Center in North Sandwich, New Hampshire before leaving to become the Director of Ocean and Coastal Policy at Duke University's Nicholas Institute. While at Duke, Pendleton also served as the Acting Chief Economist at the National Oceanic and Atmospheric Administration, through an Intergovernmental Personal Act appointment.

In 2014, Pendleton began the position of International Chair of Marine Ecosystem Services at the European Institute of Marine Studies, in the department of Marine Law and Economics (AMURE). While holding the "Chair" Pendleton also has served as the global lead ocean scientist at World Wildlife Fund and later served as the Senior Vice-president for Science at the Centre for the Fourth Industrial Revolution Ocean.

== Scholarly Contributions ==
Pendleton's work is focused on the field of marine and coastal economics, policy, conservation, and the blue economy. Currently, his work has been cited more than 7,800 times.

CLIMATE CHANGE: In 2013, Pendleton and his collaborators published one of the first studies to show the global impact of the release of greenhouse gases by the loss of coastal ecosystems (known as blue carbon). This research was later cited by the UNFCCC's SBSTA in its finding that such ecosystems represent important means of keeping carbon out of the atmosphere.

WATER QUALITY: In the United States, Pendleton has studied water quality off the beaches of Southern California, looking at the “economic contributions” of beaches and the impact that water quality has on that “contribution” including the “costs associated with pollution of coastal waters and the economic benefits associated with cleaning them.” His studies have included an investigation (in 2006) of the costs of health care and time missed from work by beachgoers due to illness related to low water quality at several South California beaches. This study was used as evidence in the Environmental Protection Agencies decision to institute the first fineable total maximum daily load regulation for beach water quality. Pendleton also filed an Amicus Curiae brief to the U.S. Supreme Court on behalf of the Natural Resources Defense Council regarding stormwater pollution.

MARINE PROTECTION: In 2002, Pendleton published a report titled “A Preliminary Study of the Value of Coastal Tourism in Rincon, Puerto Rico” assessing the percentage of Rincon's income that has coastal tourism as its source. Pendleton stated that "should the quality of the coastal and ocean resources of the area become impaired, it is likely that a large portion of Rincon's economy will be lost" and estimated the annual income generated by tourism related to coastal and ocean resources to be greater than $51.9 million. The information from this 2002 report has been cited as instrumental to the designation of the Tres Palmas Marine Reserve (in 2008) as a marine protected area, resulting in the protection of “one of the last remaining elkhorn coral reefs in the Caribbean” and the continued status of Rincon as a “surfing epicenter”.

Also in Southern California, Pendleton's research on behalf of the Santa Monica Bay Restoration Foundation played a role in implementing the Marine Life Protection Act, creating marine reserves off Westward Beach, Point Dume and Paradise Cove (in 2009). Pendleton's study surveyed California residents about their visits to the coast and determined that “more than 90 percent of visits to the Southern California coast are for ‘non-consumptive’ activities such as scuba diving, tide-pooling and surfing, and that such ‘non-take’ activities bring more money to coastal economies than ‘consumptive activities’ like fishing.” Data collected related to the impact visits to the coast have on coastal economies showed that consumptive visits brought $2.5 million to these economies while non-consumptive visits were the source of an almost $115 million.

MARINE ECOSYSTEM SERVICES: During his time at The Ocean Foundation’s Coastal Ocean Values Center in 2008, Pendleton coauthored and edited the published report “The Economic and Market Value of Coasts and Estuaries: What’s At Stake?” which presented the findings of a study assessing “the economic value of the nation’s coastal areas in excess of hundreds of billions of dollars”. The study also found that although estuaries and coasts cover a small percentage of the total land area of United States (only 13%) they are home to 43% of the United States’ population and produce 49% of its economic output. In discussion of the findings of the study, Pendleton said “We are only now coming to grips with the enormity of the economic value and potential from sustainable uses of our coastal resources, and more importantly, the potential economic losses we suffer each year because of underinvestment in coastal protection and restoration.”

INTRACOASTAL WATERWAY: In 2010, Pendleton's work focused on rethinking the operation, maintenance, and management funding of the Atlantic Intracoastal Waterway. As part of this work he undertook an expedition aboard his personal vessel, Indicator, travelling up the waterway from the Duke Marine Lab in Beaufort, NC to the Chesapeake Bay in July 2010. At the end of the expedition, Pendleton convened a policy lab in Washington, DC to bring together stakeholders interested in the Waterway's future such as governmental agency officials, commercial and recreational waterway users, environmental scientists and economists. The policy lab was convened at the request of Congressman Mike McIntyre and was planned as the first of a series of three meetings to discuss the Waterway. Pendleton's purpose in planning an expedition prior to the policy lab was to gain a “sea level perspective” of the challenges the waterway faced. He stated: “I don’t think you can speak credibly about managing the waterway without spending time on it. When you’re at the helm, it’s a completely different story.”

RESEARCH AT THE LABEX MER: As the LabexMer International Chair in Marine Ecosystem Services, Pendleton gathered a research team to develop the use of ecosystem services' theoretical framework and data to improve the management of coastal and marine areas. This includes the following projects:

- Using Impact Analysis and the Vulnerability Framework to understand the impact of Ocean Acidification on human communities;
- Applying an Ecosystem Services Approach to Marine Management (VALMER);
- Blue Forests and Blue Carbon (Global Environmental Facility program);
- Extra-Local Ecosystem Services (Mapping Ocean Wealth Program);
- Combining Earth Observations and Ecosystem Data to Monitor the Impact of Protected Areas on Ecosystem Services (European Commission's H2020 program).

== Recent Keynote Addresses ==
Rethinking Marine Conservation Science in Three Acts – the opening Keynote for the World Congress on Marine Biodiversity (May 2018, Montreal) given as a 3-act play with poet Anna Zivian and concert pianist Robert Hodge as active collaborators.

Homo digitus oceanus – The Human Side of Big Ocean Data – A collaboration with artist Adam Martinakis and poet Anna Zivian, given to the European Marine Board’s Ocean Big Data Forum. (October 2020)

A Smart and Healthy Ocean e-Forum – Ocean Data – Developed and moderatored the Ocean Data technical session for this collaborative, bi-national conference hosted by the French Embassy of Norway and the Franco-Norwegian Chamber of Commerce. (October 2020)

== Online seminars and webinars ==
- "From Caimans to Carbon" (February 2017) Marine Lab Seminar Series (presenter)

- MESP Webinar Series I (2013-2014) (host)
- The Conservation Economics Initiative Webinar Series (2014-2015) (host)
- The Pre-ESP Conference Webinars (November 2015) (host)
- The Deep-Sea Webinar Series (2015) (host)
- MESP Webinar Series II (2016) (host)

== Media ==
Pendleton comments frequently in newspapers and online media, some are referenced below.

- June 2017 "The dangers of deep-sea mining" Geographical (quoted).
- June 2017, "Biodiversity Loss from Deep-Sea Mining will be Unavoidable" Duke Today (quoted).
- March 2017, Fleming, D. "Mega Resort Threatens Puerto Rican Surf Spots" The Inertia (study referenced).
- December 2016, Patel, V. "Research maps countries that will be most impacted by large-scale coral reef loss" The Chronicle, Duke University (quoted).
- November 2016, "Coral Decay: Scientists pinpoint regions where declining coral reefs could impact people the most" PLOS Research News (interview).
- November 2016 "Rising carbon dioxide threatens coral and people who use reefs" ScienceDaily (quoted).
- November 2016, Dennis, B. "Why the death of coral reefs could be devastating for millions of humans" The Washington Post (quoted).
- October 2016 "Keeping Track of Deep-Sea Mining" Hakai Magazine for Coastal Science and Societies (quoted).
- August 2016, Pener, D. "Underwater in 40 Years? Which L.A. Beach Homes Are at Risk" Hollywood Reporter (quoted).
- May 2016 "Below the Surface with NOAA's Margaret Davidson" peopleandoceans.org (podcast).
- May 2016, "Where’s all the sand in La Jolla's beaches?" in La Jolla Light (interviewed).
- March 2016 "Scientists call for new strategy to study climate change impacts on coral reefs" Phys Org (study referenced).
- January 2016 "Time to Bring the Value of Nature Back to Earth" peopleandoceans.org (column).
- October 2015 "Inserting 'Oceans" into the Paris Climate Conversation" peopleandoceans.org (interviewer).
- May 2015, Op-Ed, "Don't weaken America's fisheries law" The News&Observer, Raleigh, NC (author).
- May 2015, Stirn, A. "Goldgrund" Süddeutsche Zeitung Magazin (quoted).
- May 2015 Neumann, C., Pendleton, L., Kettunen, M. and Agardy, T. "Learning to Speak Ecosystem Services" (coauthor).
- April 2015, podcast, "You Say Conservation is Good for People Well, Prove It" peopleandoceans.org (writer and narrator).
- February 2015, Spotts, P. "Mussels, clams hit by ocean acidification: how effects could be forestalled" The Christian Science Monitor (quoted).
- February 2015, Profeta, T., Duke NIEPS, "The Climate Post" National Geographic (quoted).
- September 2014, "Marine Ecosystem Services: How Is That Valuation Thing Treating You?" peopleandoceans.org (author).
- November 2014, Barrett, K. "Pendleton Highlights Need to Communicate The Value of Marine Ecosystem Services to Wider Audience" Ecosystem Marketplace (interview).
- April 2014, Junida, A.I. "Kawasan pesisir Indonesia punya potensi tinggi" antaranews.com (quoted).
- April 2014 Tanggal, P. "Penumpukan Sampah Ancam Pesisir Indonesia" Harian Terbit (quoted).
- March 2014 Amberger, M. "Tagbau am Meeresgrund steht vor der Tür" futurezone (quoted).
- February 2014, Santini, J. "Científicos advierten por la explotación de fondos marinos" El Observador (quoted).
- February 2014 Laperche, D. "L'appel de scientifiques pour préserver les fonds marins d'une exploitation intensive" ActuEnvironnement.com (quoted).
- February 2014 "Les fonds marins sont en grand danger, clament les scientifiques" RTBF.BE (quoted).
- February 2014 "Negli oceani ci sono molti più pesci del previsto?" Greenreport (quoted).
- February 2014, "Des scientifiques sonnent l'alarme sur l'exploitation des fonds marins" godillante.info (quoted).
- February 2014, Smith, B. "Deep Ocean Management Needed to Protect Earth's Last Frontier" redOrbit (quoted).
- April 2014, Conathan, M., Buchanan, J. and Polka, S. "The Economic Case for Restoring Coastal Ecosystems" Center for American Progress (quoted).
- February 2014, Cookson, C. "Experts call for improved 'stewardship' for deep sea mining" Financial Times ft.com/globaleconomy (quoted).
- February 2014, Kennedy, N. "Scientists call for tougher treaty to protect the deep ocean" SciDevNet (quoted).
- Video address at SCCG Coastal Economics Forum.
- June 2013, Wall, T. "Investments in Clean Beaches Pay Off" Discovery News (quoted).
- June 2013 Usheroff, M. "Surfonomics: What's the value of a wave?" The Orange County Register (quoted).
- October 2012, "La destrucción de hábitats costeros promueve de forma importante ele fecto invernadero" Noticias de la Ciencia y la Tecnología (quoted).
- September 2012, Live Science Staff "Wetland Destruction May Be Major Carbon Culprit" livescience.com (quoted).
- September 2012, provided by Duke University "Destroyed coastal habitats produce significant greenhouse gas" Phys.Org (quoted).
- September 2012 Armstrong, D. "Blue Carbon estimates up!" The Earth Times (quoted).
- August 2012, Thomas, G. "Surfonomics quantifies the worth of waves" The Washington Post (quoted).
- July 2012, Jarful, D. "DC Service Transforms Faculty Research and Teaching" DukeToday (quoted).
- March 2012, Miles, K. "California Rising Sea Levels Threaten Southern California Beaches" The Huffington Post (quoted).
- February 2012, "Climate effects on Calif. beaches studied" UPI.com (quoted).
- February 2012, Barboza, T. "California beach towns: Who wins, who loses as sea levels rise" Los Angeles Times (quoted).
- February 2012 Johnson, R. "Blue Economy Can Protect Mediterranean Sea" Global Perspectives (quoted).
- January 2012, UNEP. "Green investment needed in marine sector to trigger economic, social benefits - UN" UN News Centre (quoted).
- January 2012, Barringer, F. "Home, Home... on Less Range" New York Times (green blog) (quoted).
- January 2012, "La inversión en el secgtor marino crea empleo" (quoted).
- January 2012, "Pnuma: sustentabilidade pode alavancar produtividade marinha" Terra Brasil (quoted).
- January 2012, Mazzantini, U. "Green economy nel mare blu: una marea di benefici economici e sociali" Greenreport (quoted).
- May 2010 Hargreaves, S. "Oil spill: How much is a pelican worth?" CNNMoney (quoted).

He has also appeared on TV shows such as The History Channel's Modern Marvels as an aquaculture consultant and CBS News as a public health expert.

== Literature ==
Pendleton is the editor or co-author of 2 books and several peer-reviewed scientific papers, several of which are referenced below.

Books:

- 2008, The Economic and Market Value of America’s Coasts and Estuaries: What’s at Stake (editor and author) ISBN 978-0-615-26734-0
- 2001, with Grafton, Q. and H. Nelson, A Dictionary of Environmental Economics, Science, and Policy ISBN 1-84376-318-4

Selected marine and coastal articles:

- 2017, Sala, E., Giakoumi, S., Handling editor: Pendleton, L. "No-take marine reserves are the most effective protected areas in the ocean" In ICES Journal of Marine Science.
- 2017, Pendleton et al. "Debating the effectiveness of marine protected areas" In ICES Journal of Marine Science.
- 2017, Van Dover, C.L., et al. "Biodiversity loss from deep-sea mining" In Nature Geoscience.
- 2017, Pendleton, L. and Edwards, P. “Measuring the Human ‘So What’ of Large-Scale Coral Reef Loss?” In Biodiversity.
- 2017, Drakou, E. G., Pendleton, L., Effron, M., Ingram, J.C., and Teneva< L. “When Ecosystems and Their Services Are Not Co-Located: Oceans and Coasts.” In ICES Journal of Marine Science.
- 2017, Kraemer, R.A. et al. "Sustainable Ocean Economy, Innovation and Growth: A G20 Initiative for the 7th Largest Economy in the World" In G20 Insights.
- 2016, Pendleton et al. "Coral Reefs and people in a High-CO2 World: Where Can Science Make a Difference to People?" In PLoS ONE.
- 2016, Pendleton, L.H., Hoegh-Guldberg, O., Langdon, C. and Comte, A. "Multiple Stressors and Ecological Complexity Require a New Approach to Coral Reef Research" In Frontiers in Marine Science.
- 2015, Pendleton, L., Krowicki, F., Strosser, P., and Hallett-Murdoch, J. "Assessing the Economic Contribution of Marine and Coastal Ecosystem Services in the Sargasso Sea. NI R 14-05. Durham, NC: Duke University.
- 2015, Wasson, K., Suarez, B., Akhavan, A., McCarthy, E., Kildow, J., Johnson, K.S., Fountain, M.C., Woolfolk, A., Silberstein, M. Pendleton, L., Feliz, D. "Lessons learned from an ecosystem-based management approach to restoration of a California estuary" In Marine Policy.
- 2015, Clark, N.A., Ardron, J.A., Pendleton, L.H. "Evaluating the basic elements of transparency of regional fisheries management organizations" In Marine Policy.
- 2015, Pendleton, L.H. "Signed Peer Reviews as a Means to Improve Scholarly Publishing" In Journal of Ocean and Coastal Economics.
- 2015, Ekstrom, J.A., Suatoni, L., Cooley, S.R., Pendleton, L.H., Waldbusser, G.G., Cinner, J.R., Langdon, C., van Hooidonk, R., Gledhill, D., Wellman, K., Beck, M.W., Brander, L.M., Rittschof, D., Doherty, C., Edwards, P.E.T., Portela, R. "Vulnerability and adaptation of US shellfisheries to ocean acidification" In Nature Climate Change.
- 2014, Vegh, T., Jungwiwattanaporn, M., Pendleton, L., Murray, B. "Mangrove Ecosystem Services Valuation: State of the Literature" NI WP 14-06.
- 2014, Svensson, L.E. and Pendleton, L. "Transitioning to a New Blue Economy: Proceedings of the December 2013 Economics of the Ocean Summit" NI CP 14-01.
- 2014, Svensson, L.E. and Pendleton, L. "Working toward a More Valuable Ocean: Concepts and Ideas from Thinkers and Doers" NI WP14-01.
- 2014, 2. Börger, T., Beaumont, N., Pendleton, L., Boyle, K. Cooper, P. Fletcher, S. Haab, T., Hanemann, M. Hooper, T., Hussain, S., Portela, R., Stithou, M., Stockhill, J. Taylor, T. and M. Austen. "Incorporating Ecosystem Services in Marine Planning: The Role of Valuation" In Marine Policy.
- 2014, Barbier, E. Moreno-Mateos, D., Rogers, A., Aronoson, J. Pendleton, L. Danovaro, R., Henry, L., Morato, T., Ardron, J. and C. van Dover "Ecology: Protect the Deep Sea". In Nature.
- 2013, Baker, E., Beaudoin, Y. and Pendleton, L. "Deep Sea Minerals and the Green Economy" (Eds.) Ch. 8, Vol. 2, Secretariat of the Pacific Community.
- 2013, Pendleton, L., Solgaard, A., Hoagland, P., Holland, P., Hanley, N., Jobstvogt, N. "Sustainable Economic Development and Deep Sea Mining" (Eds.) Ch. 4, Vol. 2, Secretariat of the Pacific Community.
- 2013, Van Dover, C., Aronson, J., Pendleton, L. et al. "Ecological Restoration in the Deep Sea: Desiderata" In Marine Policy.
- 2013, 3. Aminzadeh, S., Pendleton, L., Bothwell, S., Pickle, A. and A. Boehm. "U.S. Coastal and Estuarine Stormwater Management Approaches" In Choices.
- 2013, Pendleton L. et al. "Considering Coastal Carbon in Existing U.S. Federal Statutes and Policies" In Coastal Management Journal.
- 2013, Pendleton, L., Lotker, M. "Enabling Conditions and Outstanding Challenges in Marine Protection and Management" NI PB 13-02.
- 2013, Pendleton L. et al. "Growing the U.S. Economy in the Face of Weather and Climate Extremes: A Call for Better Data" Eos, Journal of the American Geophysical Union. Volume 94, Issue 25, pages 225–226.
- 2012, Pendleton L. "Amicus Curiae Brief of Dr. Linwood Pendleton Regarding Economic Impacts of Storm Water Runoff in Support of Respondents" Supreme Court of the United States: Los Angeles County Flood District v. Natural Resources Defense Council.
- 2013, Atiyah, P., Pendleton, L., Vaughn, R., Lessem, N. "Measuring the effects of stormwater mitigation on beach attendance" In Marine Pollution Bulletin.
- 2013, Honey-Rosés, J. and Pendleton, L.H. "A Demand Driven Research Agenda for Ecosystem Services" In Ecosystem Services.
- 2012, Pendleton, L. et al. "Estimating Global “Blue Carbon” Emissions from Conversion and Degradation of Vegetated Coastal Ecosystems" Volume 7, No. 9. PLOS ONE.
- 2012, Murray, B. et al. "Coastal Blue Carbon and the United Nations Framework Convention on Climate Change" NI-PB 12-01, Nicholas Institute of Environmental Solutions.
- 2013, Pendleton, L., Gordon, D., Murray, B., Victor, B., Griffis, R., Sutton-Grier, A., Lechuga, J. "Considering 'Coastal Carbon' in Existing U.S. Federal Statutes and Policies" In Coastal Management.
- 2012, International Seabed Authority, et al. "Environmental Management Needs for Exploration and Exploitation of Deep Sea Minerals" ISA TECHNICAL STUDY: No.10.International Seabed Authority
- 2012, Gopnik, M. et al. "Coming to the table: Early stakeholder engagement in marine spatial planning" Volume 36, Issue 5. Marine Policy
- 2012, Beaudoin, Y. & Pendleton, L. "Why Value the Oceans?" UNEP-GRID Arendal and Nicholas Institute of Environmental Policy Solutions.
- 2012 United Nations Environment Programme, et al."Green Economy in a Blue World" UNEP/GRID-Arendal.
- 2011, Pendleton, L. et al. "Estimating the potential economic impacts of climate change on Southern California beaches" Volume 109, Issue 1. Climatic Change.
- 2011, Shaw, R. et al. "The impact of climate change on California’s ecosystem services" Volume 109, Issue 1. Climatic Change.
- 2011, Gordan, D. et al. "Financing Options for Blue Carbon: Opportunities and Lessons from the REDD+ Experience" NI R 11-11 Nicholas Institute for Environmental Policy Solutions.
- 2011, International Seabed Authority, et al. "Environmental Management of Deep-Sea Chemosynthetic Ecosystems: Justification of and Considerations for a Spatially-Based Approach" ISA Technical Study No. 9.
- 2011, Sifleet, A. et al. "State of the Science on Coastal Blue Carbon: A Summary for Policy Makers" NI R 11-06 Nicholas Institute of Environmental Policy Solutions.
- 2011, Murray, B., et al. "Green Payments for Blue Carbon: Economic Incentives for Protecting Threatened Coastal Habitats" NI R 11-04 C.
- 2011, Pendleton, L. et al "Size Matters: The Economic Value of Beach Erosion and Nourishment in Southern California" Volume 30, Issue 2. Contemporary Economic Policy.
- 2010, Pendleton, L. & Giles, S. "Measuring and Monitoring the Economic Effects of Restoration: Recommendations from a Blue Ribbon Panel" Volume 32, Issue 5. National Wetlands Newsletter.
- 2010, Pendleton, L. "Rethinking the Funding and Management of the Atlantic Intracoastal Waterway: Policy Lab 1 Executive Summary" Nicholas Institute of Environmental Policy Solutions.
- 2010, Murray, B. et al "Payments for Blue Carbon: Potential for Protecting Threatened Coastal Habitats" NI PB 10-05 Nicholas Institute of Environmental Policy Solutions.
- 2010, Pendleton, L. et al. "Marine Protection in the Gulf of Mexico: Current Policy, Future Options, and Ecosystem Outcomes" NI PB 10-04 Nicholas Institute of Environmental Policy Solutions.
- 2010, Pendleton, L. "Measuring and Monitoring the Economic Effects of Habitat Restoration: A Summary of a NOAA Blue Ribbon Panel" Nicholas Institute of Environmental Policy Solutions.
- 2009, Cantral, L. et al. "Principles for Marine Spatial Planning: Outcomes of the Ocean Industries MSP Policy Labs" Nicholas Institute of Environmental Policy Solutions.
- 2009, Pendleton, L. & Orbach, M. "Coastal and Marine Spatial Planning in North Carolina" NI PB 09-15 Nicholas Institute of Environmental Policy Solutions.
- 2008, Pendleton, L. "The Economics of Using Ocean Observing Systems to Improve Beach Closure Policy" Volume 36, No. 2. Coastal Management Journal.
- 2008, Pendleton, L. Are We Collecting the Right Economic Data for Conservation Needs? Indicators of Human Uses of Ecosystems in Economics and Conservation in the Tropics: A Strategic Dialogue, Resources for the Future.
- 2007, Pendleton, L. et al. Is the Non-Market Literature Adequate to Support Coastal and Marine Management? Volume 50, Issues 5-6, Pages 363-378.
- 2006, Given, S., Pendleton, L. and A. Boehm. Public Health Costs of Contaminated Coastal Waters: A Case Study of Gastroenteritis at Southern California Beaches Volume 40, No. 16, Pages 4851 -4858.
- 2006, Pendleton, L and J. Kildow. The Non-Market Value of California’s Beaches Shore and Beach (Journal of the American Shore and Beach Preservation Association), Volume 74, No. 2, Pages 34-37.
- 2004, T. Emerson and L. Pendleton. Income, Environmental Disamenity, and Toxic Releases Economic Inquiry.
- 2001, Pendleton, L. Managing Beach Amenities to Reduce Exposure to Coastal Hazards: Stormwater Coastal Management Journal, Volume 29, Pages 239-252.
- 2001, Pendleton, L., Martin, N. and D.G. Webster. Public Perceptions of Environmental Quality: A Survey Study of Beach Use and Perceptions in Los Angeles County Marine Pollution Bulletin Volume 42, Pages 1155-1160.
- 2001, Murray, C., Sohngen, B. and L. Pendleton. 2001. Valuing Water Quality Advisories and Beach Amenities in the Great Lakes Water Resources Research Volume 37, Pages 2583 – 25
- 1998, Pendleton, L. and R. Mendelsohn. Estimating the Economic Impact of Climate Change on The Freshwater Sportsfisheries of the Northeastern United States Land Economics Volume 74, Pages 483-497.
