= Linwood Gardens (New York) =

- Linwood
- U.S. National Register of Historic Places
- U.S. Historic district
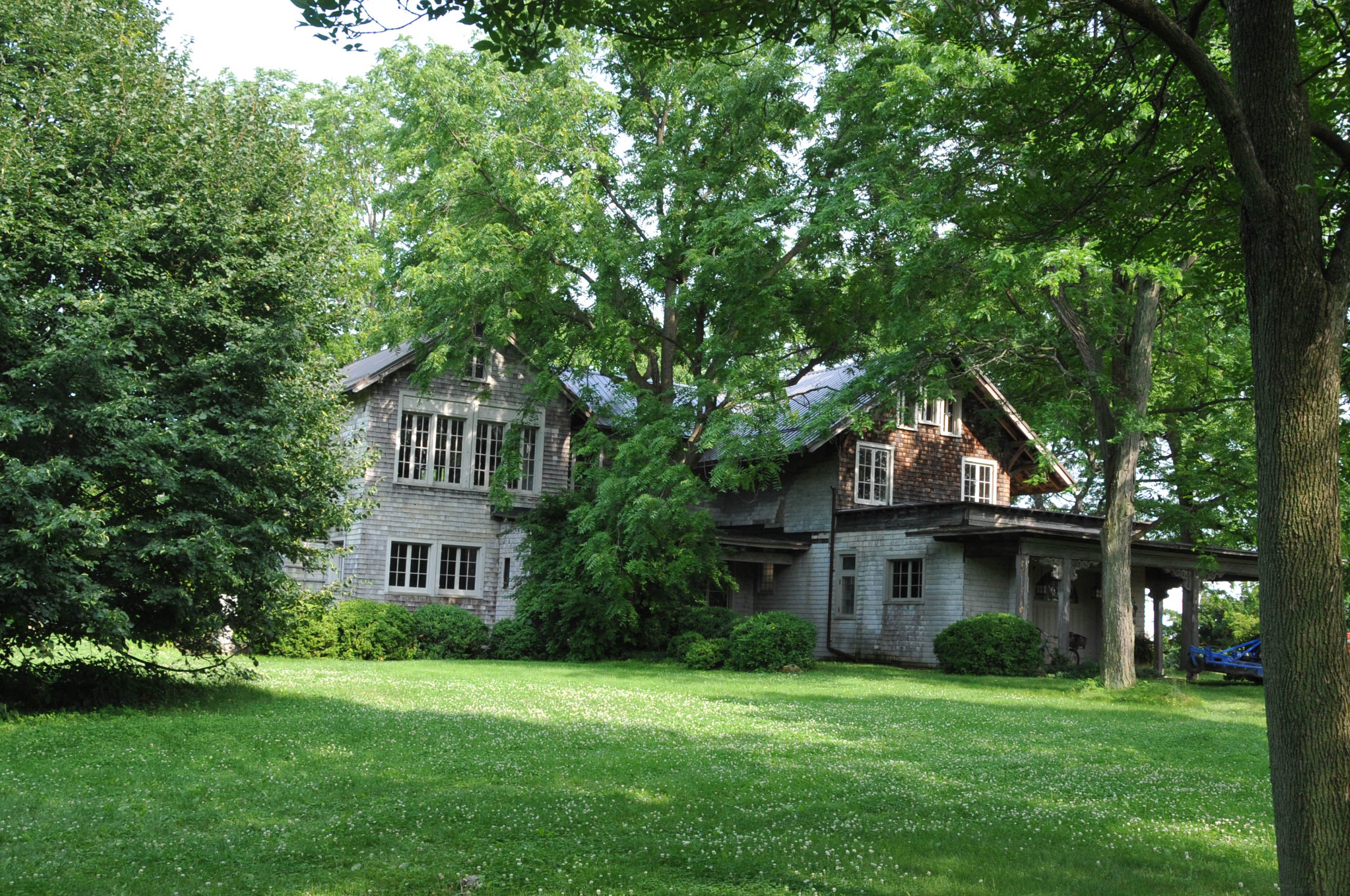

- Location within New York Location within the United States
- Location: 1912 York Rd., York, New York, U.S.
- Coordinates: 42°51′59″N 77°56′16″W
- Area: 350 acres (140 ha)
- Built: 1901
- Architect: multiple
- NRHP reference No.: 97001493
- Added to NRHP: December 15, 1997

Linwood Gardens (also known as the Gratwick Estate) is a private residence located at York in Livingston County, New York. The property is a 325-acre (1.32 km^{2}) farm centered around a summer house and surrounded by developed garden areas, woods, and meadows. Most notably, it is home to a historic collection of tree peonies collected and developed by William H. Gratwick III and Nassos Daphnis from the 1930s-1980s.

Linwood Gardens was listed on the National Register of Historic Places in 1997.

== William H. Gratwick, Sr. ==
William Henry Gratwick Sr. (1839–1899), was born in Albany and moved to Buffalo, NY in 1877 to found the lumber business Gratwick, White and Fryer Lumber Company, with offices in Tonawanda, Buffalo, and Detroit. The company owned timberland in Michigan and six ships to transport the timber on the Great Lakes. The Gratwick family lived at 776 Delaware Avenue in Buffalo in architect Henry Hobson Richardson's last commissioned home, an imposing brownstone, which stood until 1919. William succumbed to colon cancer in 1899, but notably was treated by Dr. Roswell Park of Buffalo during his illness. Mrs. Martha Weare Gratwick, William's widow, donated $25,000 to Dr. Park which assisted in the establishment of Roswell Park Comprehensive Cancer Center, the first institution in the world to focus solely on cancer research. The remaining fortune earned by William was split among his three children, including his son, William H. Gratwick Jr.

== William H. Gratwick, Jr. ==
When his father died, "Harry" assisted in management of the lumber company but preferred other pursuits, including real estate projects in the Midwest and acting as vice-president of the New York State Board of Charities. With the inheritance he also scouted out a farm property in Livingston County, New York, which proved suitable for the establishment of a summer estate, which was a popular investment for those of means. The property was purchased in 1901 and construction began immediately. Harry worked with Green and Wicks, a prominent Buffalo firm, to design the summer house, and hired Boston landscape architect Thomas Fox to plan out the surrounding roads and garden areas between about 1901–1910. The results still stand today, with some alterations. The gardens were recognized with the Historic Landscape Award from the Landmark Society of Western New York in 2015.

When Harry died in 1934, the estate was taken on by his son, William H. Gratwick III.

== William H. Gratwick III ==
"Bill" was known as a renaissance man; some of his interests included the breeding and showing of heritage horned Dorset sheep, breeding and training Arabian horses for dressage and driving, carriages, sculpture, and local theater and musical productions. His most lasting legacy, however, is the collection of Japanese and hybrid tree peonies that are still curated at Linwood Gardens, many important varieties of which were developed at the property beginning in the 1940s.

In 1934, Bill met Arthur P. Saunders, a chemistry professor and prominent American hybridizer of the tree peony. He introduced over 300 herbaceous peony varieties and over 70 varieties of tree peony in his lifetime, most notably creating distinctive yellow cultivars. Bill Gratwick worked with Saunders for a little over a decade, and imported over 100 select Japanese tree peony plants and 500 seeds from the Chugai Shokubutsu Yen nursery in Japan to complement the Saunders collections. Bill carried on Saunders' work after Saunders' death in 1953, and Gratwick eventually introduced several of his own cultivars.

== Nassos Daphnis ==
Born in Greece, Nassos Daphnis (1914–2010) was a New York City painter who met Bill Gratwick and was introduced to the world of the tree peony in the late 1930s. For most summers of his life, he visited Linwood Gardens and became deeply involved in painting the tree peonies as well as hybridizing them. His 46 cultivar introductions are in tones of pink, yellow, white, mauve, and maroon, and are named after figures in Greek mythology. The collection of tree peonies at Linwood Gardens reflects the cultivars that he developed on the property and his legacy.

== Linwood Music School and York Opera Company ==
Harriet L. Saltonstall Gratwick (1907–1999) was married to William H. Gratwick III and founded the Linwood Music School in 1947, which operated until 1963. Harriet, who studied at the Eastman School of Music, ran the school during the summer at the Gratwick estate and offered courses in voice, piano, organ, cello, and other musical instruments. Children performed in choral concerts in the gardens, and professional musicians were invited from Rochester and Buffalo to perform free concerts for the community. Mrs. Gratwick also helped establish the York Opera Company, which put on community productions of Gilbert and Sullivan musicals.
