= Linwood Historic District (Linwood, Maryland) =

Historic district in Maryland, United States

- U.S. National Register of Historic Places
- U.S. Historic district
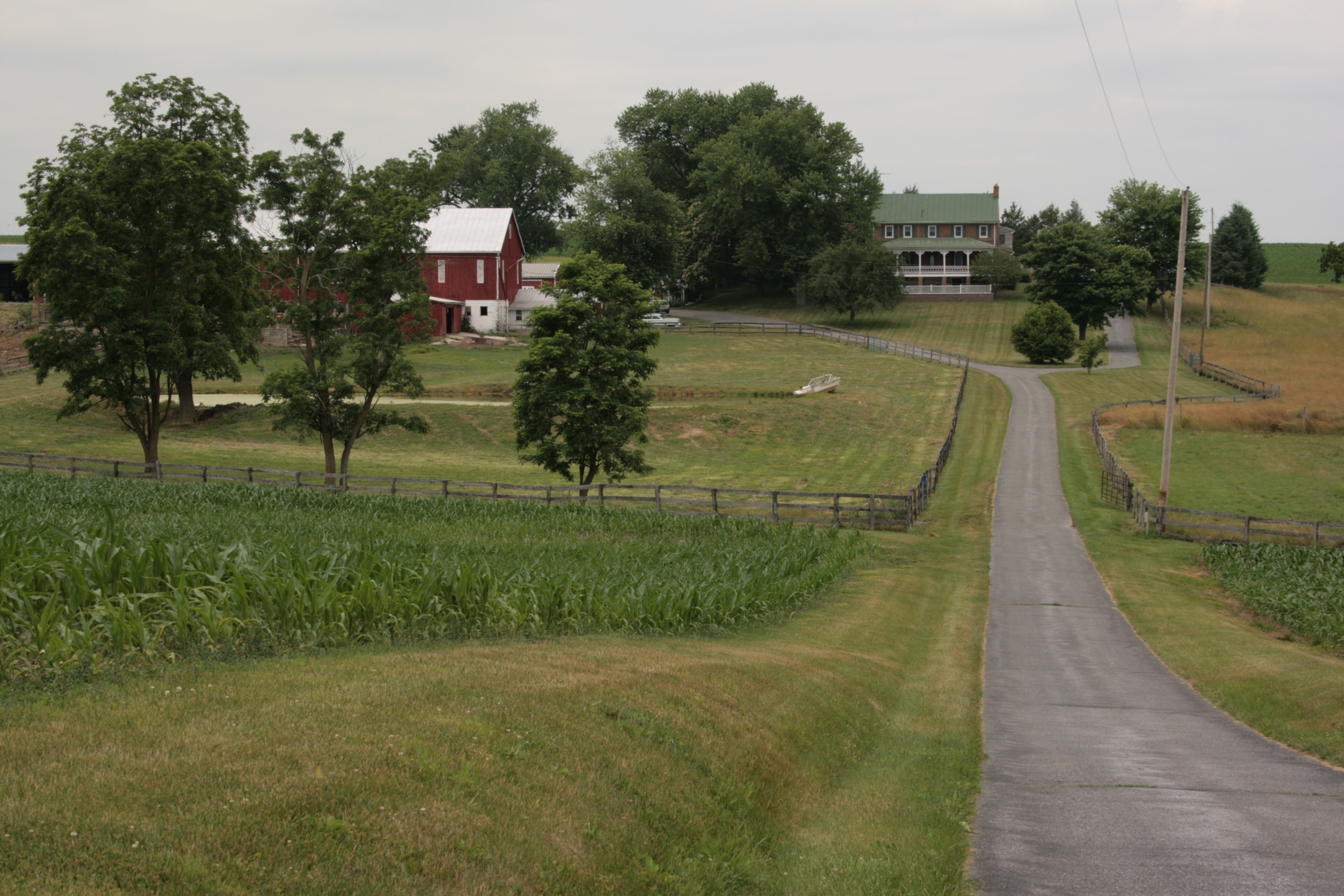
- Franz Farm in the district

- Location within Maryland Location within the United States
- Location: McKinstry's Mill Rd., Linwood, Maryland
- Coordinates: 39°33′39″N 77°8′30″W
- Area: 35 acres (14 ha)
- Architectural style: Late Victorian
- NRHP reference No.: 80001801
- Added to NRHP: September 27, 1980

Linwood Historic District is a national historic district at Linwood, Carroll County, Maryland, United States. The district includes a mixture of railway structures (grain elevator, freight station, site of demolished Western Maryland Railway station), community structures (general stores, post office, church, Sunday School hall/schoolhouse, site of blacksmith shop) and residences with rural dependencies (smokehouses, ice houses, windmills, sub-cellars). They date to the 19th and early-20th century and most structures relate to Linwood's role as a rail depot for the transportation of farm goods and supplies.

It was added to the National Register of Historic Places in 1980.
