= Mary Linwood Comprehensive School =

Former school in Leicester, England

Mary Linwood Comprehensive School was a secondary school located in the English city of Leicester.

The school was an all-girls school till 1976 when it started to admit boys from the, closing, Linwood Boys school, the last year of all girls left in 1980. Before closure in 1997, the school became an annex of Riverside Business & Enterprise College (formerly Riverside Community College) and after Mary Linwood School's closure most of the teachers and any remaining students transferred to Riverside.

In 2007, Leicester City Council considered the establishment of a City Academy on the site of the former Mary Linwood Secondary School. The principal sponsor of this Academy is the Church of England. The Council transferred the site of the former secondary school (Mary Linwood) to the sponsors. Samworth, Leicester's first City Academy, was built on the site of the old Mary Linwood school and completed in September, 2007.

The children of author Sue Townsend attended the school during the late 1970s and early 1980s; their experiences influenced her highly successful Adrian Mole books. The Secret Diary of Adrian Mole was reputedly based on Sue Townsend's son's experiences at the school. Several of the teachers who appear in the book (such as Mr. Dock and Miss Fossington-Gore) are based on actual staff who worked at the school in the early 1980s.
