= Linwood Springs Research Station =

Bird research station in Wisconsin, US

Coordinates: 44°28′14″N 89°38′17″W

The Linwood Springs Research Station (LSRS) is a raptor research station located in Stevens Point, Wisconsin. Each fall, the station conducts studies on migrant northern saw-whet owls are to gain information about their migration routes, molt patterns, mortality rates, and winter and summer ranges.

The station also studies red-shouldered and sharp-shinned hawks. These are nesting ecology studies that are conducted annually to determine productivity, reoccupancy, natal dispersal, and nest site fidelity.

Additionally, each summer and fall a five-day raptor workshop is offered for those interested in gaining valuable field experience working with many of the techniques used in raptor studies.
