= Croceae (Laconia) =

Coordinates: 36°52′16″N 22°33′37″E

Croceae or Krokeai (Ancient Greek: Κροκέαι) was a village of ancient Laconia on the road from Sparta to Gythium, and near the latter place. It was celebrated for its marble quarries. Pausanias describes the marble as difficult to work, but when wrought forming beautiful decorations for temples, baths, and fountains. There was a marble statue of Zeus Croceates before the village, and at the quarries bronze statues of the Dioscuri. The most celebrated of the Corinthian baths was adorned with marble from the quarries at Croceae. A number of blocks of green Laconian porphyry from the quarries at Croceae have been found in the Minoan palace at Knossos.

These quarries were discovered by the French Commission two miles (3 km) southeast of Krokees (formerly, Levétzova); and near the village have been found some blocks of marble, probably the remains of the statue of Zeus Croceates. A memorial of the worship of the Dioscuri at this place still exists in a bas-relief, representing the two gods with their horses: beneath is a Latin inscription. The marble in these quarries is green porphyry; and though not suitable for Grecian temples, it would be greatly prized by the Romans, who employed extensively variegated kinds of marble for the decoration of their buildings. Hence it is probable that the marble celebrated by the Romans under the name of Laconian was this green porphyry from Croceae; and that it was the quarries of this place which, Strabo says, were opened by the Romans at Taygetus.
