= Linganore =

Linganore may refer to a place in the eastern United States:

- Linganore Creek, a tributary of the Monocacy River
- Linganore, Maryland, a census-designated place surrounding Lake Linganore, a reservoir on Linganore Creek
- Lake Linganore, Maryland, residential community roughly corresponding to the Linganore CDP
- Linganore-Bartonsville, Maryland, a former census-designated place
- Linganore AVA, an American Viticultural Area in parts of Frederick and Carroll counties, Maryland
- Linganore Farm, listed on the National Register of Historic Places in Frederick, Maryland
- Linganore High School, a high school in eastern Frederick County, Maryland
