= Spring Ridge, Maryland =

- Census-designated place
- Flag Seal

- Location in Maryland Spring; Ridge (the United States)
- Coordinates: 39°24′15″N 77°20′26″W
- Country: United States
- State: Maryland
- County: Frederick

Area
  - Total: 2.72 sq mi (7.04 km^{2})
  - Land: 2.69 sq mi (6.97 km^{2})
  - Water: 0.027 sq mi (0.07 km^{2})
- Elevation: 430 ft (130 m)

Population (2020)
  - Total: 6,005
  - Density: 2,230.8/sq mi (861.31/km^{2})
- Time zone: UTC−5 (Eastern (EST))
  - Summer (DST): UTC−4 (EDT)
- Area codes: 301 and 240
- FIPS code: 24-74560
- GNIS feature ID: 2583691

Spring Ridge is a census-designated place (CDP) and suburban housing community in Frederick County, in the U.S. state of Maryland, just outside the city of Frederick. As of the 2020 census it had a population of 6,005. Before 2010, it was part of the Linganore-Bartonsville, Maryland census-designated place, which was split into three for the 2010 census.

== Geography ==
Spring Ridge is in east-central Frederick County, bordered to the west, across the Monocacy River, by the city of Frederick; to the north by Linganore Creek; to the east, at Meadow Road, by the Linganore CDP; and to the south, across Maryland Route 144, by the Bartonsville CDP. Interstate 70 runs through the middle of the Spring Ridge CDP, leading west 4 miles (6 km) to Frederick and east 34 miles (55 km) to the Baltimore Beltway. Primary access to the community is via the Spring Ridge Parkway from MD 144.

According to the U.S. Census Bureau, the Spring Ridge CDP has a total area of 2.67 square miles (6.91 km^{2}), of which 2.64 square miles (6.83 km^{2}) is land and 0.031 square miles (0.08 km^{2}), or 1.14%, is water.

== Demographics ==
Historical population
Census	Pop.	Note	%±
2020	6,005		—
U.S. Decennial Census

=== 2020 census ===
As of the 2020 census, Spring Ridge had a population of 6,005. The median age was 38.0 years. 26.0% of residents were under the age of 18 and 13.2% of residents were 65 years of age or older. For every 100 females there were 90.9 males, and for every 100 females age 18 and over there were 85.1 males age 18 and over.

100.0% of residents lived in urban areas, while 0.0% lived in rural areas.

There were 2,154 households in Spring Ridge, of which 38.9% had children under the age of 18 living in them. Of all households, 57.8% were married-couple households, 9.8% were households with a male householder and no spouse or partner present, and 27.3% were households with a female householder and no spouse or partner present. About 23.7% of all households were made up of individuals and 11.9% had someone living alone who was 65 years of age or older.

There were 2,209 housing units, of which 2.5% were vacant. The homeowner vacancy rate was 0.5% and the rental vacancy rate was 3.1%.

Racial composition as of the 2020 census
Race	Number	Percent
White	4,640	77.3%
Black or African American	388	6.5%
American Indian and Alaska Native	22	0.4%
Asian	256	4.3%
Native Hawaiian and Other Pacific Islander	1	0.0%
Some other race	175	2.9%
Two or more races	523	8.7%
Hispanic or Latino (of any race)	474	7.9%

== Education ==
It is in Frederick County Public Schools.

School zoning is as follows: Areas are divided between Spring Ridge Elementary School and Oakdale Elementary School. Areas are divided between Governor Thomas Johnson Middle School and Oakdale Middle School. All areas in the CDP are zoned to Oakdale High School.
