= Linganore AVA =

American Viticultural Area in Maryland

Coordinates: 39°25′59″N 77°11′24″W

Linganore
- Wine region
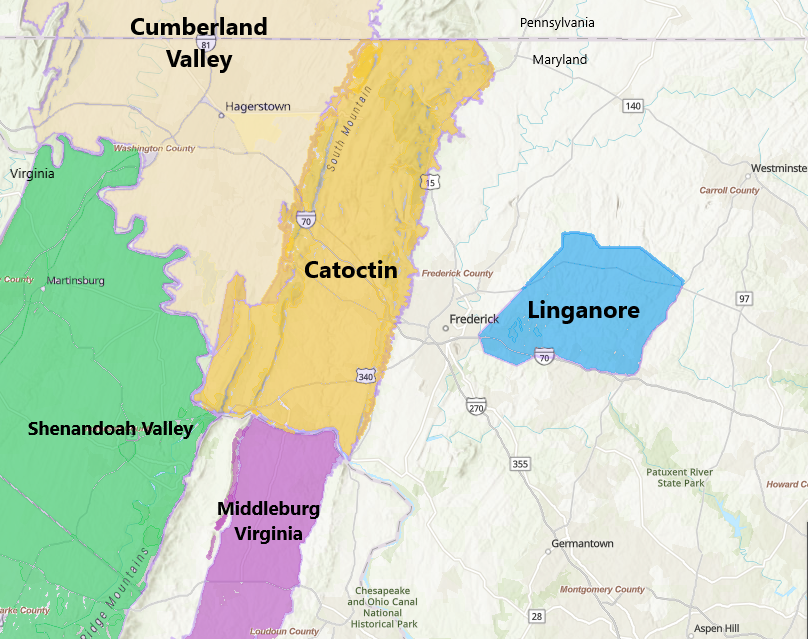
- Type: American Viticultural Area
- Year established: 1983
- Years of wine industry: 50
- Country: United States
- Part of: Maryland
- Other regions in Maryland: Catoctin AVA, Cumberland Valley AVA
- Growing season: 170–180 days
- Climate region: Region III
- Heat units: 3,001–3,700 GDD
- Precipitation (annual average): 40–42 in (1,000–1,100 mm)
- Soil conditions: Shale bedrock with gravelly loam containing silt and mica specs
- Total area: 57,600 acres (90 sq mi)
- Size of planted vineyards: 52 acres (21 ha)
- No. of vineyards: 5
- Grapes produced: Cabernet Sauvignon, Chambourcin, Chardonel, Traminette
- No. of wineries: 6

Linganore (/lɪŋɡəˈnɔːr/ ling-guh-NAWR) is an American Viticultural Area (AVA) located in north central Maryland and includes parts of Frederick and Carroll counties. It was established as the nation's 45^{th} and the state's initial appellation on August 18, 1983 by the Bureau of Alcohol, Tobacco and Firearms (ATF), Treasury after reviewing the petition submitted by Mr. John (Jack) T. Aellen Jr., proprietor of the bonded winery Berrywine Plantations Inc., on behalf of himself and local vintners proposing a viticultural area to be known as "Linganore."

The viticultural area lies east of the town of Frederick in north central Maryland. At the outset, it encompassed approximately 90 square miles (57,600 acres) where about 52 acres (21 ha) of cultivation for commercial purposes. The acreage devoted to grape-growing is widely dispersed. In 1980, approximately 19.5% of the total commercial grape acreage of Maryland was planted in the Linganore viticultural area. This area is a part of the Piedmont Plateau northwest of Baltimore, a transition area between the mountains to the west and the coastal plain to the east. Linganore has a warm and wet climate, with gravel and loam soils and a high water table.

== History ==
Linganore AVA was Maryland's first viticulture area designated in 1983 based on the ATF petition submitted by Jack Aellen of Berrywine Plantation LLC recognizing the potential in Maryland vitculture. The Aellen family started Linganore Winecellars in 1976 on a farm north of Mt. Airy producing French hybrids, native American, dry and sweet fruit wines, and some flavored wines such as Sangria and Mead. The Catoctin AVA was designated a couple of months thereafter, followed two years later by Cumberland Valley viticultural area.

== Terroir ==
=== Topography ===
The petitioner claims the viticultural area is distinguishable from the surrounding area on the basis of climate, soil, geology, and other physiographical features. The viticultural area is served by the Monocacy River drainage system. Linganore Creek is the only Monocacy River tributary in the viticultural area and has a sizeable drainage basin of its own. The boundaries of the viticultural area correspond, as much as possible, with the boundaries of the Linganore Creek drainage basin or watershed. The boundaries of the Linganore Creek watershed have been determined by the United States Soil Conservation Service and designated as MD-MA-Pot-54.The viticultural area encompasses an area which is geographically associated on the basis of watershed criteria. The surrounding areas are served by watersheds which do not serve the viticultural area.

=== Climate ===
The petitioner submitted United States Soil Conservation Service maps which depict climatic data for the viticultural area and the surrounding area. The viticultural area has an average annual rainfall of 40 to 42 inches (1,000–1,100 mm), temperature of 55–60 °F (13–16 °C), and a frost-free season of 170–180 days. The area to the west of the viticultural area has an average annual rainfall of 36 to 40 inches (910–1,020 mm), temperature of 50–55 °F (10–13 °C), and a frost-free season of 160–170 days. The area to the east of the viticultural area has an average annual rainfall of 40 to 44 inches (1,000–1,100 mm), temperature of 55–60 °F (13–16 °C), and a frost-free season of 170–180 days. The viticultural area is generally warmer, wetter, and has a longer frost-free season than the area to the west; and is slightly cooler, dryer, and has a shorter frost-free season than the area to the east. In addition, using the same heat summation criteria as used by Amerine and Winkler under their climatic region concept, the viticultural area would be classified as Region 3 while the area to the west would be classified as Region 2. That is, the sum of the mean daily temperature above 50 °F (10 °C), expressed in temperature-time values of degree days, for each day in the period April–September of any given year is generally 3,001–3,700 for the viticultural area and 2,5001–3,000 for the area to the west. The USDA plant hardiness zones are 7a and 7b.

=== Geology ===
The geomorphological characteristics of the viticultural area generally correspond to distinguishable geological features which define a "piedmont," i.e., an area lying along or near the foot of a mountain range. The viticultural area lies to the east of Catoctin Mountain, part of the "Blue Ridge" mountain range, and a limestone valley, which surrounds the town of Frederick and lies between Catoctin Mountain and the viticultural area. The area lying to the east of the viticultural area is part of the coastal plain.

=== Soils ===
The soil in the viticultural area is primarily of the "Manor" series. It is found throughout the viticultural area in various soil associations. The major soil associations are Manor-Glenelg, Conestoga-Manor, Manor-Edgemont-Brandywine, Manor-Linganore-Montalto, and Manor-Linganore-Urbana. Manor soil is a two-to-eight-foot-deep (1 to 2 m) gravelly loam containing much silt and small specs of mica. It is well to excessively drained and tends to be "droughty" in years of low rainfall. However, it is underlaid with shale bedrock, which tends to have a high water table, that partially offsets the effects of low rainfall. The natural pH of the soils in the viticultural area is between 5.1 and 6.5, i.e., strongly acid to slightly acid. The petitioner claims this is ideal for the growing of grapes. The types of soil found in the viticultural area are also found in the area to the east of the viticultural area. However, the types of soil found in the area to the west of the viticultural area, beginning around the town of Frederick, are different from those found in the viticultural area.
