= Linganore, Maryland =

Linganore, Maryland Lake Linganore
- Census-designated place
- Flag Logo

- Location in Maryland Linganore (the United States)
- Coordinates: 39°24′46″N 77°18′05″W
- Country: United States
- State: Maryland
- County: Frederick

Area
  - Total: 8.56 sq mi (22.18 km^{2})
  - Land: 8.28 sq mi (21.44 km^{2})
  - Water: 0.29 sq mi (0.75 km^{2})
- Elevation: 476 ft (145 m)

Population (2020)
  - Total: 12,351
  - Density: 1,492.1/sq mi (576.12/km^{2})
- Time zone: UTC−5 (Eastern (EST))
  - Summer (DST): UTC−4 (EDT)
- ZIP code: 21774
- Area codes: 301 and 240
- FIPS code: 24-47040
- GNIS feature ID: 2633180
- Website: www.lakelinganore.org

Linganore is a census-designated place (CDP) in Frederick County, in the U.S. state of Maryland. It consists of the area around Lake Linganore, a residential community governed by a homeowners association, located east of the city of Frederick. As of the 2020 census the CDP had a population of 12,351. Prior to 2010, the area was part of the Linganore-Bartonsville CDP. The mailing address for the area is Lake Linganore, with a ZIP code of 21774, although the U.S. Postal Service recommends NEW MARKET MD.

== Geography ==
The community is in eastern Frederick County, on both sides of Linganore Creek, a west-flowing tributary of the Monocacy River and part of the Potomac River watershed. The neighborhoods of the community surround Lake Linganore, an impoundment on the creek, and extend south to Interstate 70, between New Market to the east and Bartonsville and Spring Ridge to the west. Downtown Frederick is 7 miles (11 km) west of the center of Linganore.

According to the U.S. Census Bureau, the Linganore CDP has a total area of 6.0 square miles (15.5 km^{2}), of which 5.8 square miles (14.9 km^{2}) is land and 0.2 square miles (0.6 km^{2}), or 4.15%, is water.

== Demographics ==
Historical population
Census	Pop.	Note	%±
2020	12,351		—
U.S. Decennial Census

=== 2020 census ===
As of the 2020 census, Linganore had a population of 12,351. The median age was 36.5 years. 30.3% of residents were under the age of 18 and 9.7% of residents were 65 years of age or older. For every 100 females there were 96.2 males, and for every 100 females age 18 and over there were 93.0 males age 18 and over.

98.7% of residents lived in urban areas, while 1.3% lived in rural areas.

There were 4,049 households in Linganore, of which 48.7% had children under the age of 18 living in them. Of all households, 70.5% were married-couple households, 8.9% were households with a male householder and no spouse or partner present, and 16.3% were households with a female householder and no spouse or partner present. About 13.1% of all households were made up of individuals and 5.6% had someone living alone who was 65 years of age or older.

There were 4,347 housing units, of which 6.9% were vacant. The homeowner vacancy rate was 1.3% and the rental vacancy rate was 37.5%.

Racial composition as of the 2020 census
Race	Number	Percent
White	9,666	78.3%
Black or African American	499	4.0%
American Indian and Alaska Native	37	0.3%
Asian	672	5.4%
Native Hawaiian and Other Pacific Islander	3	0.0%
Some other race	220	1.8%
Two or more races	1,254	10.2%
Hispanic or Latino (of any race)	865	7.0%

== Education ==
It is in Frederick County Public Schools.

School zoning is as follows: Areas are divided between Blue Heron, Deer Crossing, Linganore Creek, Oakdale, and Spring Creek elementary schools. Most areas are zoned to Oakdale Middle School while some are zoned to Newmarket Middle School and Governor Thomas Johnson Middle School. Oakdale High School and Linganore High School take portions of the CDP.
