= New Market West, Maryland =

Unincorporated community in Maryland, United States

- Unincorporated area
- Location in Maryland New Market; West (the United States)
- Coordinates: 39°23′19″N 77°16′50″W
- Country: United States of America
- State: Maryland
- County: Frederick
- Elevation: 469 ft (143 m)
- Time zone: UTC-5 (Eastern (EST))
  - Summer (DST): UTC-4 (EDT)
- Area codes: 301 and 240
- GNIS feature ID: 1712160

New Market West is a suburban housing community in Frederick County, in the U.S. state of Maryland. The community is located in the foothills of the Blue Ridge Mountains and is adjacent to the town of New Market.

== Geography ==
New Market West is in east-central Frederick County bordered to the south, east, and north by the town of New Market and to the west by the Linganore census-designated place. Two streams, Cherry Run and Walnut Run, run through the community. The primary access to the community is via Royal Oak Drive from MD 144.

== Education ==
The community's residents feed into three schools in the Frederick County Public School system: New Market Elementary School, New Market Middle School, and Linganore High School.

== Climate ==
New Market West is located in the north eastern humid subtropical climate zone (Köppen Cfa), with hot, humid summers and moderately cold winters. The community of New Market West is located in the Piedmont of the Appalachian Mountains.

Climate data for New Market West, Maryland
Month	Jan	Feb	Mar	Apr	May	Jun	Jul	Aug	Sep	Oct	Nov	Dec	Year
Mean daily maximum °F (°C)	42.1 (5.6)	46.5 (8.1)	55.7 (13.2)	67.7 (19.8)	76.6 (24.8)	85.0 (29.4)	88.9 (31.6)	86.6 (30.3)	79.9 (26.6)	68.2 (20.1)	56.5 (13.6)	45.1 (7.3)	66.6 (19.2)
Mean daily minimum °F (°C)	25.8 (−3.4)	28.2 (−2.1)	34.5 (1.4)	44.7 (7.1)	54.0 (12.2)	63.1 (17.3)	67.9 (19.9)	66.3 (19.1)	58.9 (14.9)	47.3 (8.5)	35.8 (2.1)	30.1 (−1.1)	46.4 (8.0)
Average precipitation inches (mm)	2.79 (71)	2.71 (69)	3.64 (92)	3.54 (90)	4.12 (105)	4.23 (107)	3.09 (78)	3.60 (91)	3.93 (100)	2.87 (73)	3.15 (80)	3.41 (87)	41.08 (1,043)
Average snowfall inches (cm)	7.2 (18)	4.8 (12)	2.5 (6.4)	0 (0)	0 (0)	0 (0)	0 (0)	0 (0)	0 (0)	0 (0)	0.3 (0.76)	1.7 (4.3)	16.5 (42)
Source: NOAA
