= Maryland wine =

Wine from Maryland

Maryland
- Wine region
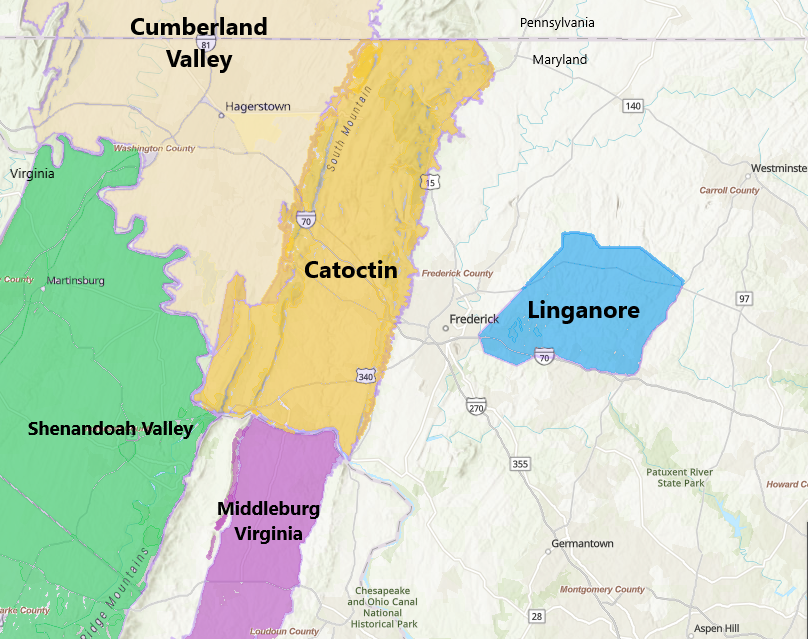
- Official name: State of Maryland
- Type: U.S. State Appellation
- Year established: 1788
- Years of wine industry: 378
- Country: United States
- Sub-regions: Catoctin AVA, Cumberland Valley AVA, Linganore AVA
- Climate region: Humid subtropical/continental
- Total area: 6.2 million acres (9,707 sq mi)
- Size of planted vineyards: 450 acres (180 ha)
- Grapes produced: Albariño, Arneis, Auxerrois blanc, Barbera, Blaufränkisch, Cabernet Franc, Cabernet Sauvignon, Carignan, Carménère, Chardonnay, Chenin blanc, Dolcetto, Gewürztraminer, Malbec, Malvasia, Marsanne, Merlot, Montepulciano, Mourvèdre, Müller-Thurgau, Muscat, Muscat of Alexandria, Muscat blanc, Nebbiolo, Nero d'Avola, Pais, Petit Manseng, Pinot Meunier, Petite Sirah, Petit Verdot, Pinot blanc, Pinot grigio, Pinot noir, Pinotage, Riesling, Rkatsiteli, Roussanne, Ruby Cabernet, Rubired, Sauvignon blanc, Sangiovese, Sémillon, Sultana, Symphony, Syrah, Tannat, Tempranillo, Tinta Barroca, Tinta Cão, Touriga Franca, Touriga Nacional, Trebbiano, Viognier, Zinfandel
- No. of wineries: Over 80

Maryland wine refers to wine made from grapes grown in the U.S. state appellation of Maryland. The industry has grown rapidly since the first winery in Maryland, Boordy Vineyards, opened in 1945. It is estimated that the industry contributes $50 million annually to the Maryland economy.

== History ==
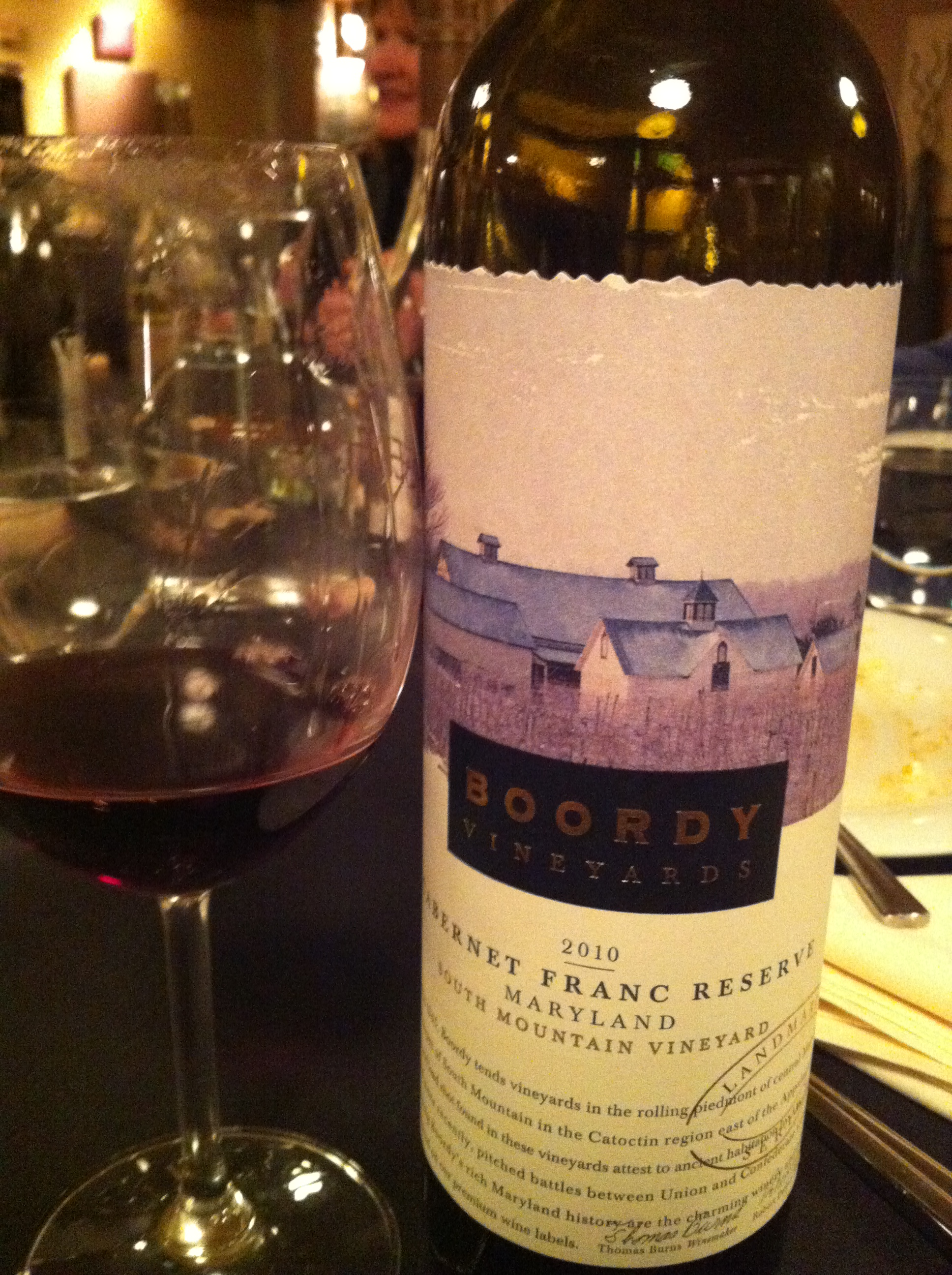
A Cabernet Franc from Boordy Vineyards.

The state's history of viticulture begins in 1648 with the earliest recorded instance of winemaking in Maryland. Fourteen years later, the first European grapes planted in Maryland were deposited in 200 acres (80.9 ha) on the east bank of St. Marys River. It was not until the 1930s that Philip Wagner, a columnist with the Baltimore Sun, published American Wines and How to Make Them. The book was later revised as Grapes Into Wine and became the definitive book on winemaking in America.

The 1980s proved to be a definitive decade for the industry. In 1981, the Maryland Grape Growers Association was formed, followed by the Maryland Wineries Association in 1984. That same year, the Maryland Wine Festival was held for the first time and the Maryland Winery and Grape Growers Advisory Board was formed.

In 2000, the Maryland State Legislature passed Maryland House Bill 414, allowing state wineries to sell wine by the glass at the winery and to bring product onto retail licensed premises for promotional activities. A record crowd of more than 25,000 attended the Maryland Wine Festival and Maryland wineries sold a record 86,954 US gallons (329,157 L) of wine.

Throughout the years that followed, the industry saw many changes as well as growing success. The instigator of such success was the Maryland Wineries Association's first-ever major cooperative marketing campaign, "Ask For Maryland Wine."

== Wine regions ==
Maryland has four distinct growing regions, allowing for a wide diversity of grape varieties that will thrive throughout the State.

=== Piedmont Plateau ===
A majority of the state's vineyards are planted in Central Maryland, from the foothills west of Frederick, Maryland to the head of the Chesapeake Bay. The state's oldest wineries are located in the Piedmont Plateau as well as the Frederick and Mason-Dixon Wine Trails. There are clusters of wineries around Westminster and north of Baltimore. Cabernet Sauvignon, Merlot, Cabernet Franc, Chardonnay and Pinot Gris are planted, which consists of Harford, Baltimore, Carroll, Howard, Montgomery and Frederick Counties.

=== Eastern Shore ===
The Eastern Shore is known for its warm days and cool nights. The soil is sandy and well-drained, and the climate is moderated by the Chesapeake Bay. A wide variety of grapes are growing throughout the Upper Shore (Cecil, Kent and Queen Anne's Counties), Mid Shore (Talbot, Dorchester and Caroline Counties) and Lower Shore (Somerset, Worcester and Wicomico Counties).

=== Southern Plain ===
Southern Maryland gets hot, and stays hot night and day for most of the summer. This may not be good for some varieties, but many Southern Italian and other Mediterranean varieties are found growing in the region. Barbera, Sangiovese, Montepulciano, Chardonnay, Vidal, Blaufrankisch, Symphony and other varieties are planted in the region, which consists of Anne Arundel, Prince George's, Calvert, Charles and St. Mary's Counties.

=== Western Mountain ===
Western Maryland plays host to a number of vineyards and two wineries. Grapes in this region must be more cold-hardy and able to withstand long winters and a short growing season. Varieties such as Cabernet Sauvignon, Cabernet Franc, Petit Verdot, Chardonnay, Norton/Cynthiana, Chambourcin, Vidal and Seyval are found in the region. The region consists of Washington, Allegany and Garrett Counties.

== Prominent figures ==
Phillip M. Wagner is still considered a very prominent figure for those in the amateur and commercial sides of wine making. Wagner is the author of Grapes into Wine and several other books having to do specifically with North American wine making. Including several revisions of his original book "American Wines and How to Make Them" originally published in 1933. He was also the founder of Maryland's own Boordy Vineyards where he experimented with various wine making techniques most notably hybridization of grapes. Wagner's literary career includes serving as the editor of the Baltimore Sun newspaper and writing a biography of fellow Sun editor, H.L. Mencken. He died December 29, 1996.

== Maryland Wine Festival ==
The Maryland Wine Festival is a wine festival that showcases Maryland wine on the third weekend of September annually. The festival was established in 1984 in Union Mills, Maryland and has been held at the Carroll County Farm Museum in Westminster, Maryland since 1985. It is one of the oldest and largest wine festivals on the East Coast, hosting over 25,000 people and featuring more than 200 wines for sampling each year.

== Wine Industry ==
A growing number of for-profit and non-profit organizations have been established since the 1980s to help promote Maryland Wine. Two of the more well known organizations are the Maryland Grape Growers Association and the Maryland Wineries Association. The number of vineyards and wineries in Maryland grow each year. As of 2019 there are over 80 registered vineyards and wineries in the state.

Maryland Vineyards/Wineries
Antietam Creek Vineyards	Autrey Vineyards	Balla Cloiche Vineyards	Basignani Winery (1986)
Big Cork Vineyards	Birch View Vineyard	Black Ankle Vineyards	Blue Mountain Wine Crafters
Bonita Winery & Vineyard	Boordy Vineyards (1945)	Bordeleau Winery	Broken Spoke Vineyard & Winery
Cabin Vineyard	Casa Carmen Winery	Cassinelli Winery & Vineyards	Catoctin Breeze Vineyard
Celebration Cellars Winery	Charis Winery	Chateau Bu De	Clovelly Vineyard
Cool Ridge Vineyard	Costa Ventosa Winery	Cove Point Winery	Crow Vineyard
Dejon Vineyards	Detour Vineyard And Winery	Dove Valley Vineyard	Dragonfly Vineyard
Dry Seneca Creek Vineyards	Far Eastern Shore Winery	Fridays Creek Winery	Frog Eye Vineyard
Galloping Goose Vineyards	Gemeny Winery & Vineyard	Generations Vineyard	Great Frogs Vineyard
Great Shoals Winery	Harford Vineyard	Harmony Vineyards And Winery	Heimbuch Estate Vineyards
Hidden Hills Winery	Janemark Winery & Vineyard	Knob Hall Winery	La Felicetta Vineyard & Wine Cellars
Lands Point Winery & Vineyards	Layton's Chance Vineyard & Winery		Linganore Wine Cellars
Links Bridge Vineyards	Little Ashby Vineyards	Love Point Vineyards And Winery	Mark Cascia Vineyards
New Market Plains Vineyard	Mazzaroth Vineyard	Morning Song Vineyards	Mount Felix Winery
Old Westminster Vineyard	Olney Winery At Stone House Square	Perigeaux Vineyards And Winery	Port Of Leonardtown Winery
Red Heifer Winery	Robin Hill Farm And Vineyards	Romano Vineyard & Winery	Royal Rabbit Vineyards
Running Hare Vineyard	Salisa Winery And Vineyard	Serpent Ridge Vineyard	Shelton Vineyards
Solomons Island Winery	Springfield Manor Winery & Distillery	St. Michaels Winery	Still Creek Vineyards
Stonemur Winery	Sugarloaf Mountain Vineyard	Terrapin Station Winery	The Loew Vineyards
The Urban Winery	The Vineyards At Dodon	The Winery At Olney	Tidewater Vineyards
Tilmon'S Island Winery	Toasted Goat Winery	Turkey Point Vineyard	Whistle Stop Winery
Windmill Creek Vineyard And Winery	Windridge Vineyards	Woodhall Vineyards And Wine Cellars	Xella Winery And Vineyard

== See also ==
- American wine
