= Catoctin AVA =

American Viticultural Area in Maryland

Coordinates: 39°38′50″N 77°23′24″W

Catoctin
- Wine region
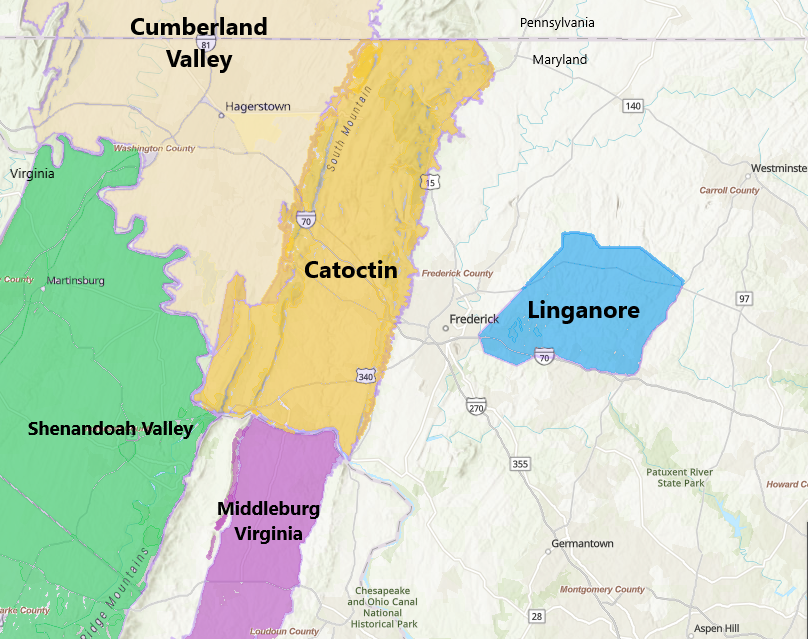
- Type: American Viticultural Area
- Year established: 1983
- Years of wine industry: 81
- Country: United States
- Part of: Maryland
- Other regions in Maryland: Cumberland Valley AVA, Linganore AVA
- Growing season: 170–180 days
- Climate region: Region II
- Heat units: 2,501–3,000 GDD
- Precipitation (annual average): 38–42 in (970–1,070 mm)
- Soil conditions: Myersville-Fauquier-Catoctin association
- Total area: 169,600 acres (265 sq mi)
- Size of planted vineyards: 84.5 acres (34 ha)
- No. of vineyards: 6
- Grapes produced: Albariño, Barbera, Cabernet Sauvignon, Cabernet Franc, Muscat Canelli, Pinot noir, Riesling, Tannat, Vidal blanc
- Varietals produced: Albariñno, Cabernet Sauvignon, Cabernet Franc, Merlot, Petite Verdot, Tannat, Teroldego, Vidal Blanc
- No. of wineries: 7
- Wine produced: Albarino, Cabernet Sauvignon, Cabernet Franc, Merlot, Petite Verdot, Tannat, Teroldego, Vidal Blanc, Rosé

Catoctin is an American Viticultural Area (AVA) located in Frederick and Washington counties of western Maryland. "Catoctin" is Algonquian word translated, cf. Ojibwa gidagasin: "speckled rock", "flecked rock" or "spotted rock," a geological stone which abounds in the Catoctin Mountain. The area was established as the nation's 45^{th} and the state's second appellation on October 13, 1983 by the Bureau of Alcohol, Tobacco and Firearms (ATF), Treasury after reviewing the petition submitted by W. Bret Byrd, proprietor of the bonded Byrd Vineyards & Winery, on behalf of himself and local vintners proposing a viticultural area known as "Catoctin."

The 169,600-acre (265 sq mi) viticultural area lies a few miles west of the town of Frederick in western Maryland consisting of a large intermountain valley and upland areas immediately surrounding the valley. The eastern and western boundaries are distinguished by the Catoctin Mountain and South Mountain, respectively. The northern and southern boundaries are defined by the Maryland-Pennsylvania State line and the Potomac River. At the outset, there were approximately 84.5 acres (34 ha) under vine for commercial purposes. The acreage devoted to grape-growing is widely dispersed. In 1980, approximately 31.5% of the total commercial grape acreage in Maryland was planted in its Blue Ridge region of Catoctin. In addition, scattered throughout, are many small vineyards, generally under an acre, which are used by the owners for private purposes. There was one bonded winery, operated by the petitioner, with a 30 acres (12 ha) vineyard and six (6) commercial vineyard operations. Currently, about seven commercial wineries operate in the AVA where the USDA plant hardiness zones range from 6b to 7b.

== History ==
The name Catoctin (/kəˈtɒktɪn/ kuh-TOCK-tin) was given to the area by the indigenous Algonquin Indians who historically hunted and roamed the mountains and inner valleys. In 1945, Philip Wagner, editor of the Baltimore Sun, started Boordy Vineyards, the first bonded winery in the higher elevated, cooler Piedmont of Maryland. There is an operating winery with a 30 acres (12 ha) vineyard and six (6) major vineyard operations in the viticultural area. In addition, there are numerous small vineyards, generally under an acre, which are used by the owners for private purposes. The acreage devoted to grape-growing is widely dispersed. There are approximately 84.5 acres (34 ha) of wine-grapes.

== Terroir ==
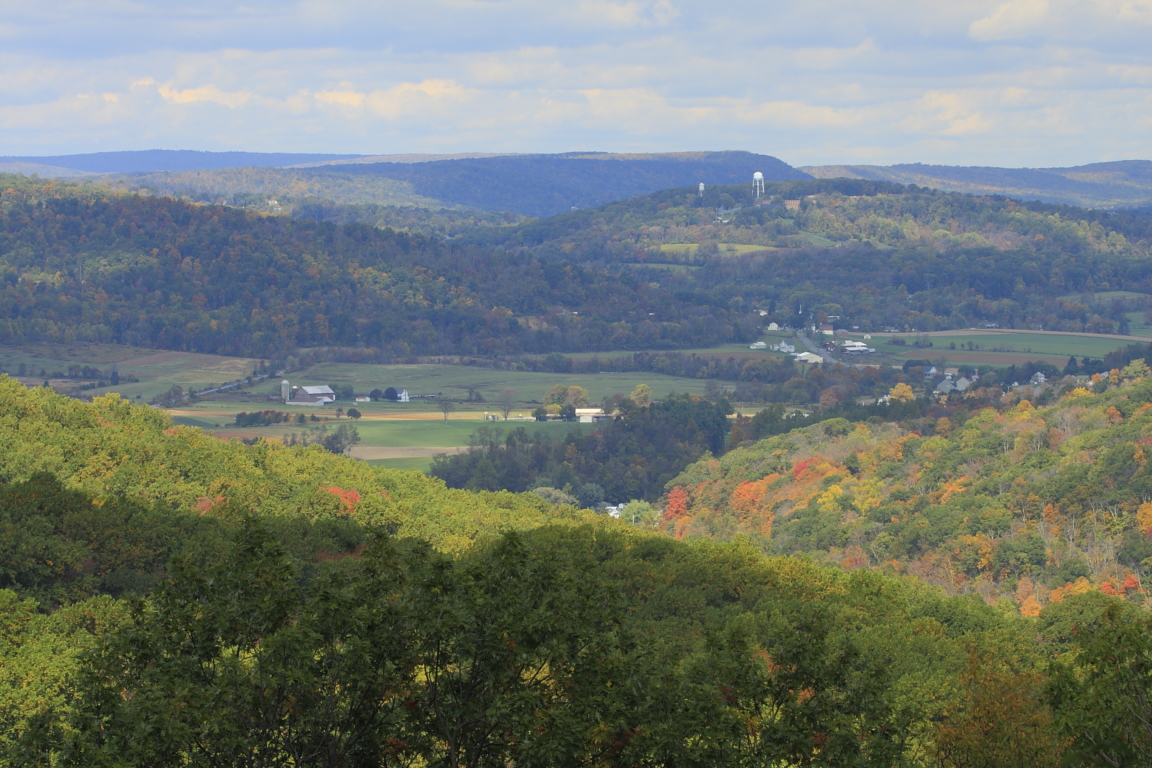

=== Topography ===
The Catoctin, South Mountain and the Blue Ridge are all mountains which belong to the Appalachians and with the inner valleys make up the Maryland Land Resource Area (MLRA) #130 called Blue Ridge, which is the exact area of the Catoctin AVA. It is the smallest land resource area in Maryland. The petition claims the viticultural area is distinguishable from the surrounding area on the basis of climate, soil, geology, and other physiographical features.
The general geomorphology of the viticultural area corresponds to distinguishable geologic features which define a valley and an upland area. The valley lies between low mountains that rise to an elevation of about 2,000 feet (610 m) and belong to. the easternmost fringe of the Appalachian Mountains. The mountains surrounding the valley are formed of sedimentary, metamorphic sedimentary, and igneous rocks while the valley is composed almost entirely of green schistose rock, a metamorphosed basalt. The valley area is distinguished by the surrounding uplands. The upland areas are distinguished from surrounding areas by adjacent limestone valleys.

The name Catoctin permeates the area. The Catoctin Soil Conservation District lies within MLRA #130. The Catoctin Mountain makes the eastern boundary of MLRA #130. The Catoctin Valley also known as the Middletown Valley extends for over 20 miles (32 km). The main drainage arteries is Little Catoctin Creek and also Catoctin Creek and empties into the Potomac River. The Catoctin Mountain Park is within the MLRA #130. Three major physiographic provinces cross Frederick County in a general north and south direction but tending slightly toward northeast to southwest. The Piedmont Plateau lies in the eastern and south-eastern part of the county. The Limestone Valley and the Triassic Plain are located in the center. The easternmost low ranges of the Appalachian Mountains, with their inter-mountain valleys, lie in the western part of the county, i.e., the viticultural area.

Two low ranges of the Appalachian Mountains cross Frederick County. South Mountain runs along the Washington County line. Its highest point within Frederick County is Lambs Knoll, at an elevation of 1,772 feet (540 m). Catoctin Mountain runs from the Potomac River northward within the county. Its maximum elevation is 1,917 feet (584 m). The trough like central part of the county is made up of a shallow limestone valley in the southern part and a low Triassic upland plain in the northern part. Elevations in the Frederick Valley are between 300 and 400 feet (91 and 122 m).

=== Climate ===
The petitioner submitted United States Soil Conservation Service (SCS) maps which depict climatic data for the viticultural area and the surrounding area. The viticultural area has an average annual rainfall of 36 to 42 inches (910–1,070 mm), temperatures of 50–55 °F (10–13 °C), and a frost-free season of 160–170 days. The area to the east has an average annual rainfall of 40 to 42 inches (1,000–1,100 mm), temperature of 55–60 °F (13–16 °C), and a frost-free season of 170–180 days. The area to the west has an average annual rainfall of 38–46 inches (970–1,170 mm), temperatures of 45–50 °F (7–10 °C), and a frost-free season of 150–160 days. The viticultural area is generally dryer, warmer, and has a longer frost-free season than the area to the west; and is dryer, cooler, and has a shorter frost-free season than the area to the east. Moreover, precipitation during any given year is somewhat unevenly distributed with the highest amount occurring in midsummer and midwinter and the least amount in autumn. Furthermore, the frost-free season decreases in length with increasing elevation and from south to north. In addition, using the same heat summation criteria as used by Amerine and Winkler under their climatic region concept, the viticultural area would be classified as Region 2, while the area to the west would be classified as gradually changing from Region 2 to Region 1 and the area to the east would be classified as Region 3. That is, the sum of the mean daily temperature above 50 °F (10 °C), expressed in temperature-time values of degree days, for each day in the period April–September of any given year is generally 2,501–3,000 for the viticultural area; 2,001–2,500 for the area to the west; and, 3,001–3,500 for the area to the east. To summarize, the petitioner contends the viticultural area possesses a unique set for growing conditions which distinguish it from the surrounding area. In addition, the petitioner claims these conditions have a marked influence on the amount and distribution of heat and moisture received by grapes during the growing season. This, in turn, affects the development and balance of sugar, acid, and other constituents of grapes grown in the viticultural area.

=== Soils ===
The soils in the viticultural area belong to several different soils series in various associations. These soils are characteristic of those found on mountains, elevated intermountain areas, or in intermountain valleys. The soil in the intermountain valley area, where the majority of wine-grapes are grown, is almost entirely of the Myersville-Fauquier-Catoctin association. The surrounding uplands are primarily composed of the Dekalb, Clymer, Edgemont, Chandler, Talladega, Highfield, and Fauquier soil series in various associations. The soils in the viticultural area have been developed from sandstone, greenstone (metabasalt), mica schist and quartzite parent materials and are acidic. The soils in adjacent valleys have been developed from limestone based parent materials and are alkaline. The natural pH of the soil in the viticultural area is between 5.5 and 6.5, i.e., strongly acid to slightly acid which is considered ideal for the growing of grapes.

== Viticulture ==
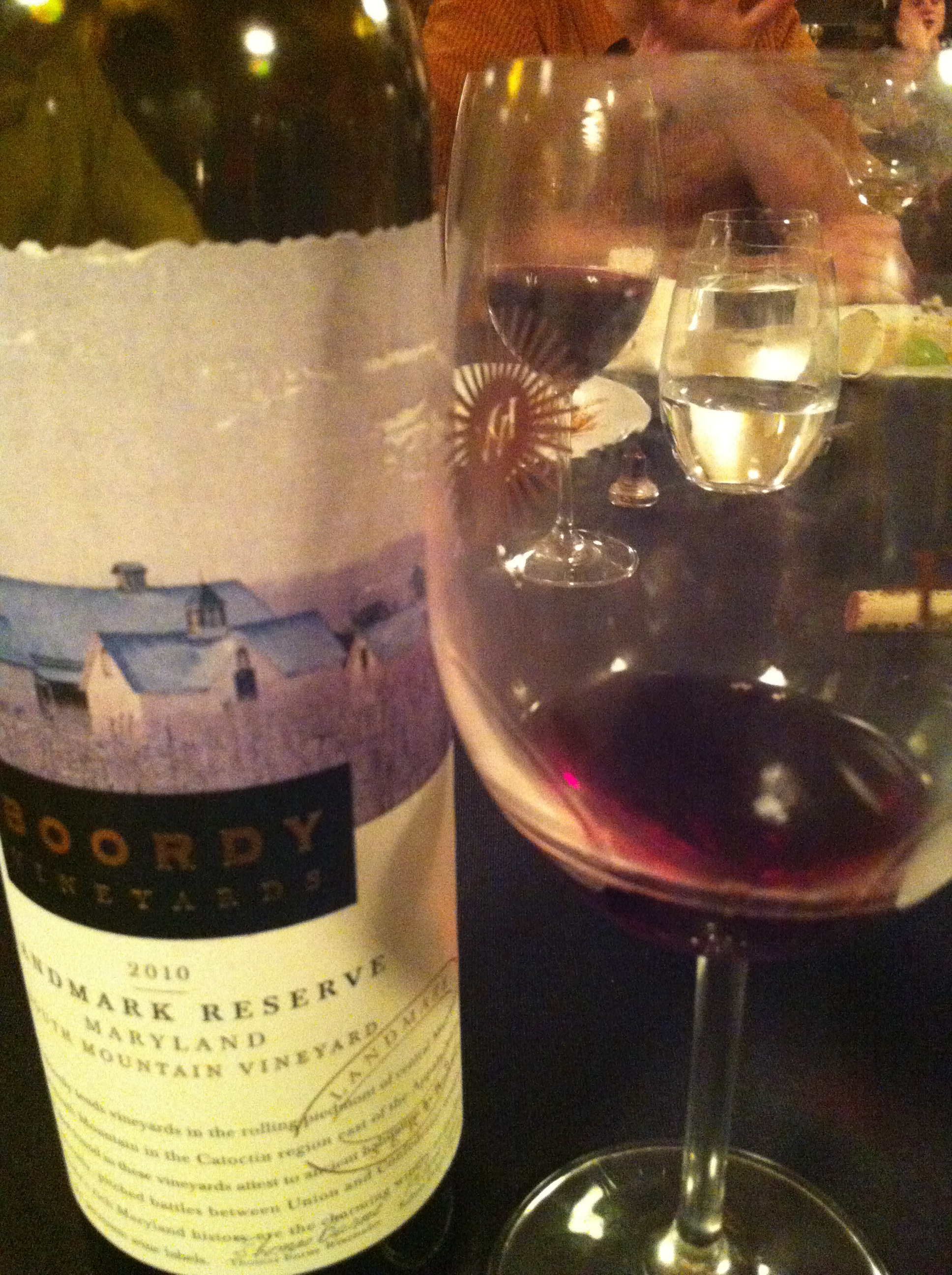
Boordy Red Blend

In 1945, Philip Wagner, editor of the Baltimore Sun, started Boordy Vineyards, the first bonded winery in the region. He sold it, in 1980, to the DeFord family which had supplied grapes and continues to operate Boordy today with four generations involved. They live and work on the farm, and cultivate 46 acres (19 ha) in two different regions: Long Green Valley where the winery is located, and South Mountain Vineyard in the western Blue Ridge. Catoctin's name recognition is so limited that even the wines from the region use the better known "Maryland" state appellation on the bottles.
