= Monocacy Aqueduct =

Canal in Maryland, United States of America

Coordinates: 39°13′25″N 77°27′7″W

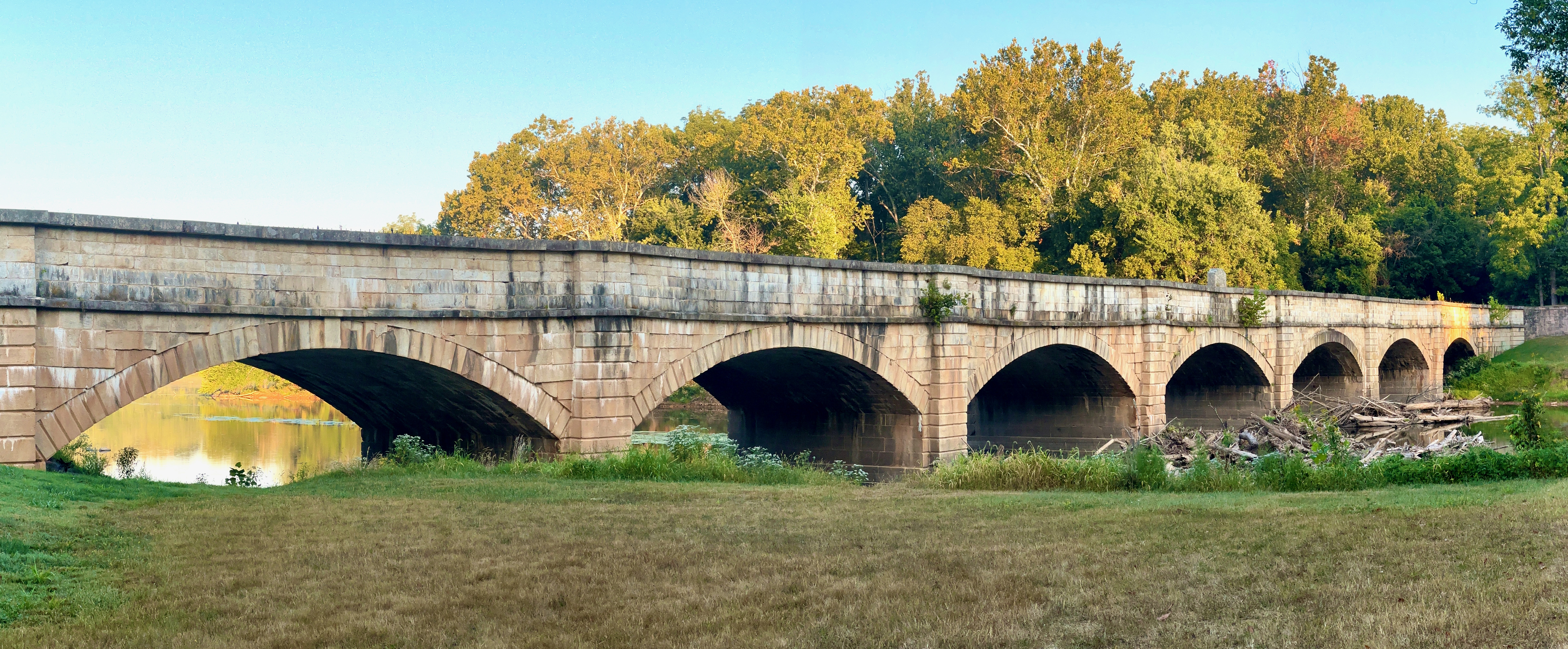
Monocacy Aqueduct in 2023

The Monocacy Aqueduct — or C&O Canal Aqueduct No. 2 — is the largest aqueduct on the Chesapeake and Ohio Canal, crossing the Monocacy River just before it empties into the Potomac River in Frederick County, Maryland, USA. The 438 foot (133.5 m) aqueduct was built by three separate contractors between 1829 and 1833 at a cost of US$127,900.

== Description ==
The aqueduct is a stone masonry structure with a waterway of 19 feet at the bottom and 20 feet at the top. The towpath parapet wall is 8 feet wide and the upstream wall is 6 feet wide. Benjamin Wright, the project's chief engineer, drew the plans with 6 piers, 2 abutments and 7 arches, each with a span of 54 feet. The piers are 10 feet thick with a pilaster at each end. The aqueduct is 438 feet in length. Much of the building material was large quartzite stone blocks quarried at the base of nearby Sugarloaf Mountain.

== History ==
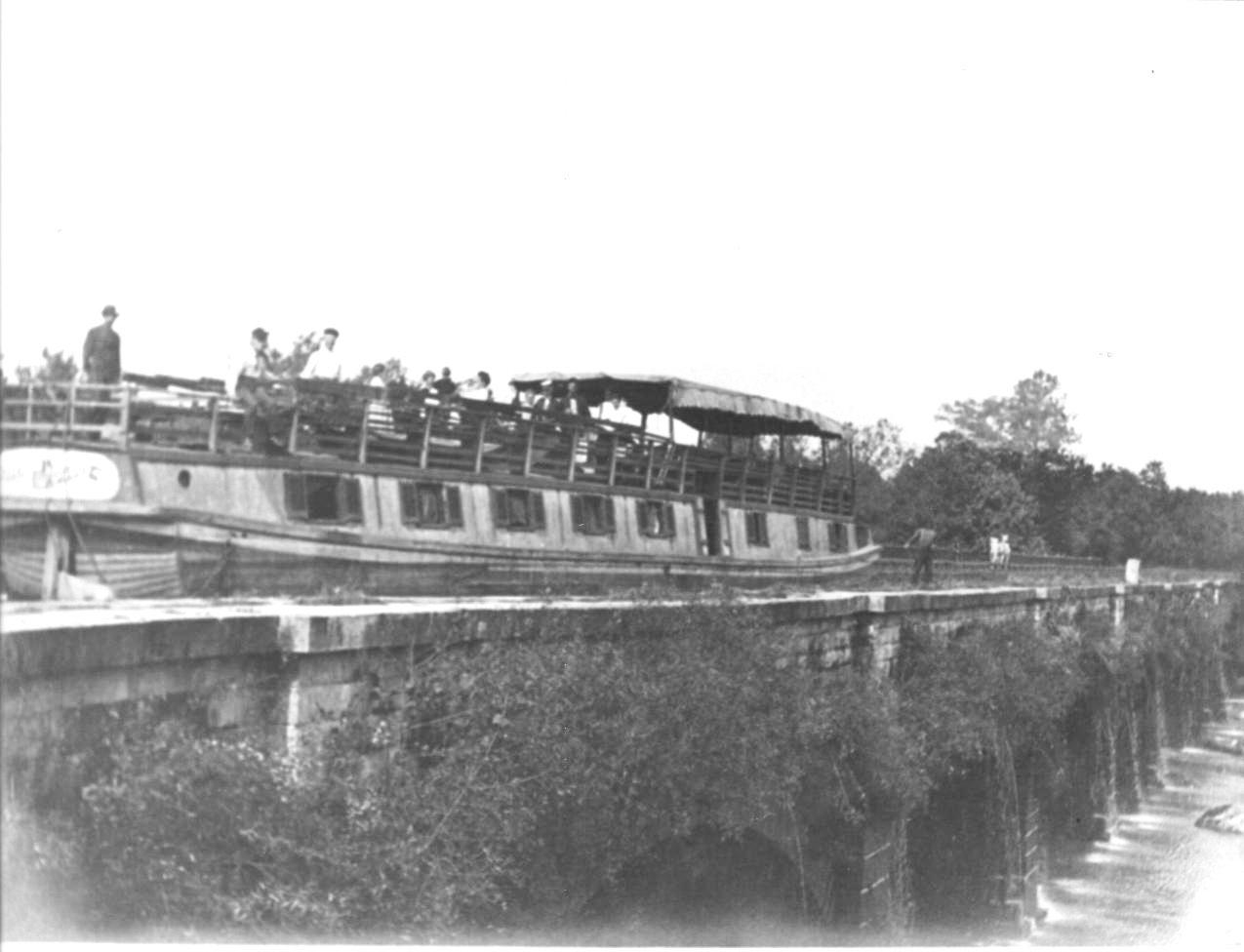
Boat on the Monocacy Aqueduct

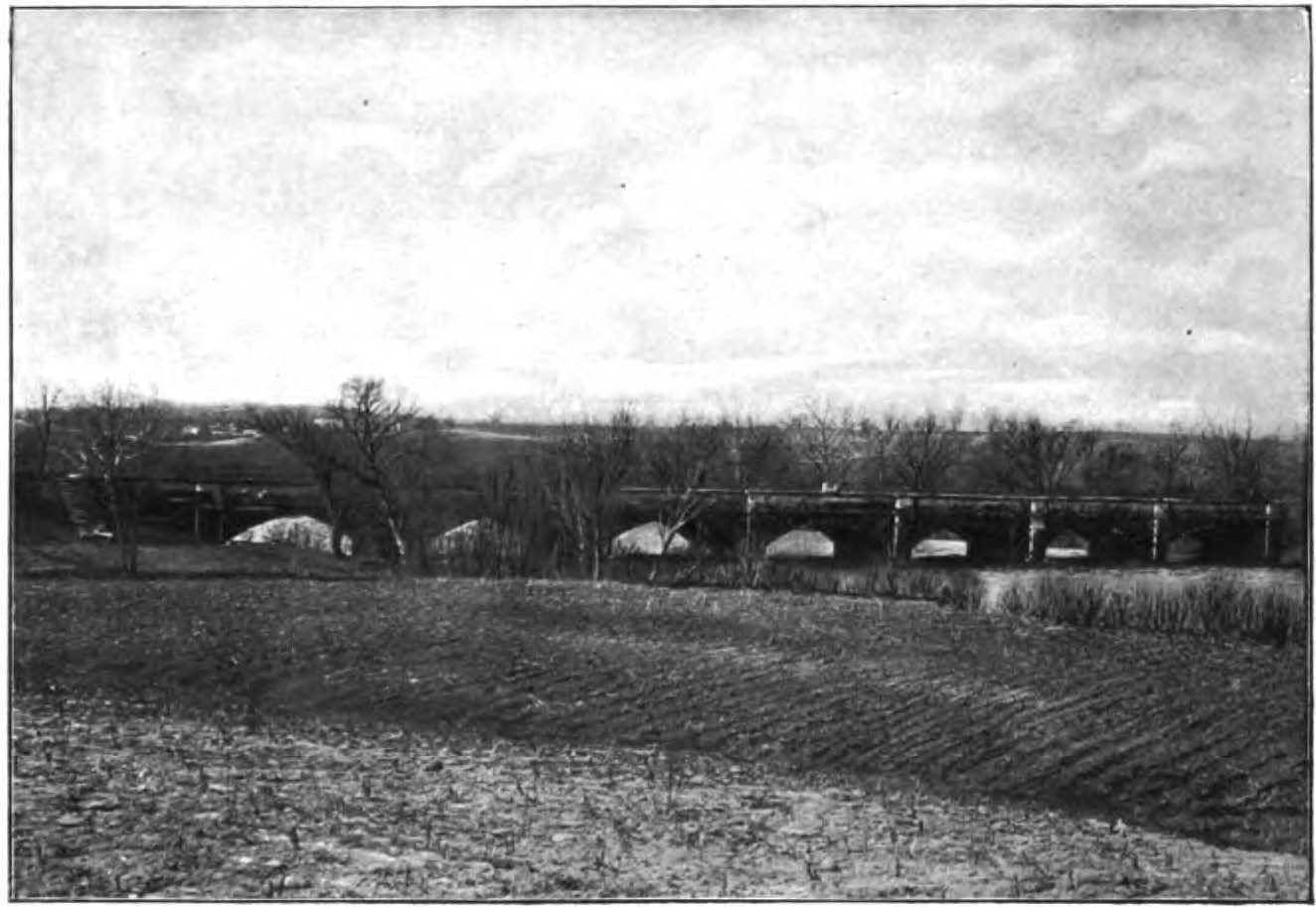
The Monocacy Aqueduct c. 1898

The first contract for the aqueduct was awarded in August 1828 to Hovey and Legg, which began work in 1829. The contract was next awarded to Asher Osbourn, but by the end of 1830, it was in the hands of Byrne and Lebaron.

During the American Civil War the Union used the canal to transport war materials and troops along the border between Maryland, Virginia, and points west. For this reason, the canal and the aqueducts were often under Confederate attack. There were many Confederate sympathizers among the canal employees, including Thomas Walter, keeper of Lock 27. Walter loved the South, but he loved the Monocacy Aqueduct more. When he learned that Confederate General D. H. Hill had orders to destroy it in order to halt boat traffic during the Antietam campaign in September 1862, Walter convinced Hill that draining the canal would achieve the same end. Walter saved the Monocacy Aqueduct, only for it to be threatened once again a few days later when another Confederate party attempted to blow up the aqueduct. However, the soldiers were unable to drill enough holes into the hard stone to place enough explosives to breach the structure.

== Granary ==
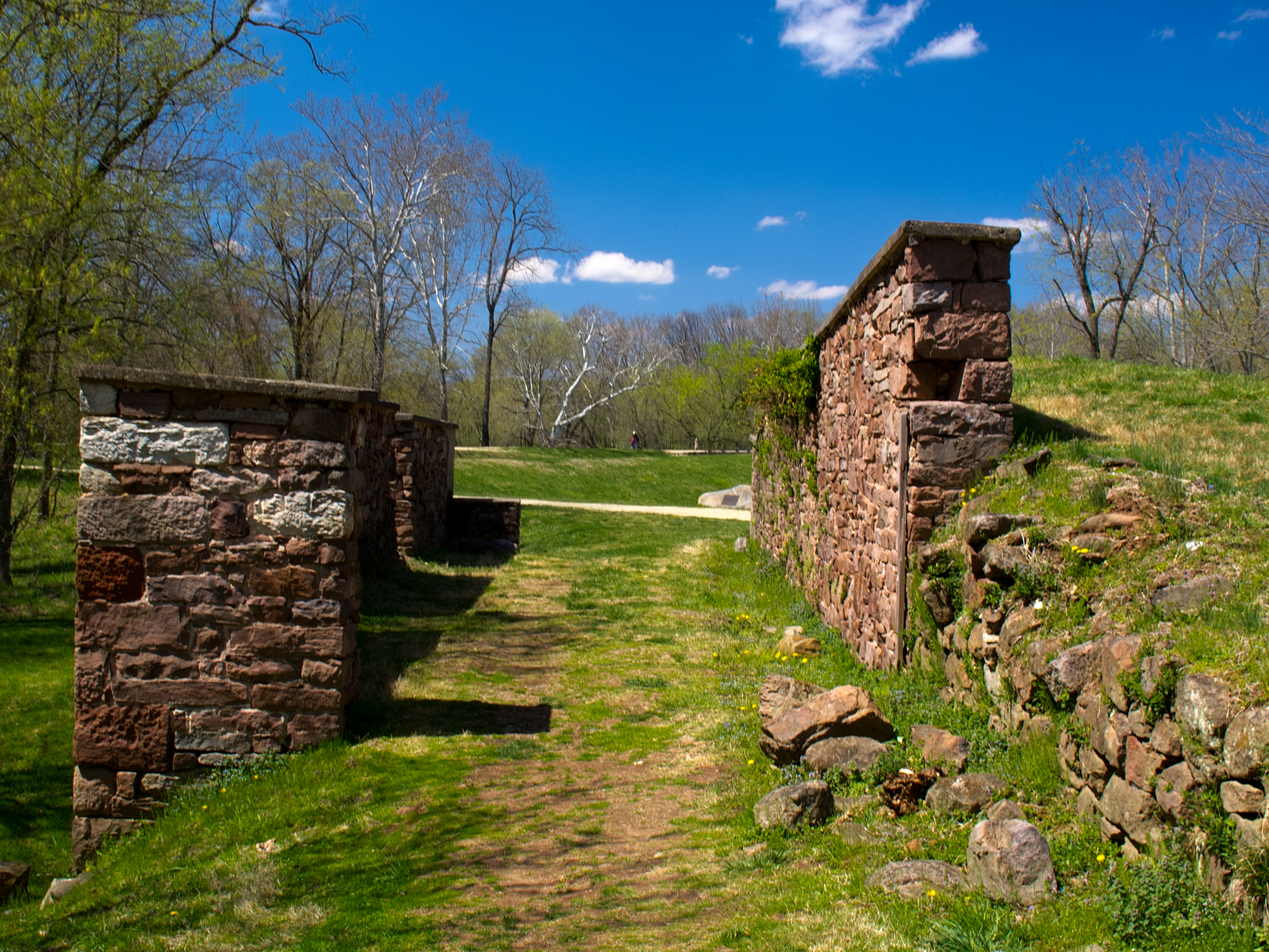
Ruins of Monocacy village granary

Like at Whites Ferry, a granary was built here, having three storage bays, two passageways for the boats, and only one story. The remains of the granary are next to the parking lot.

== Current status ==
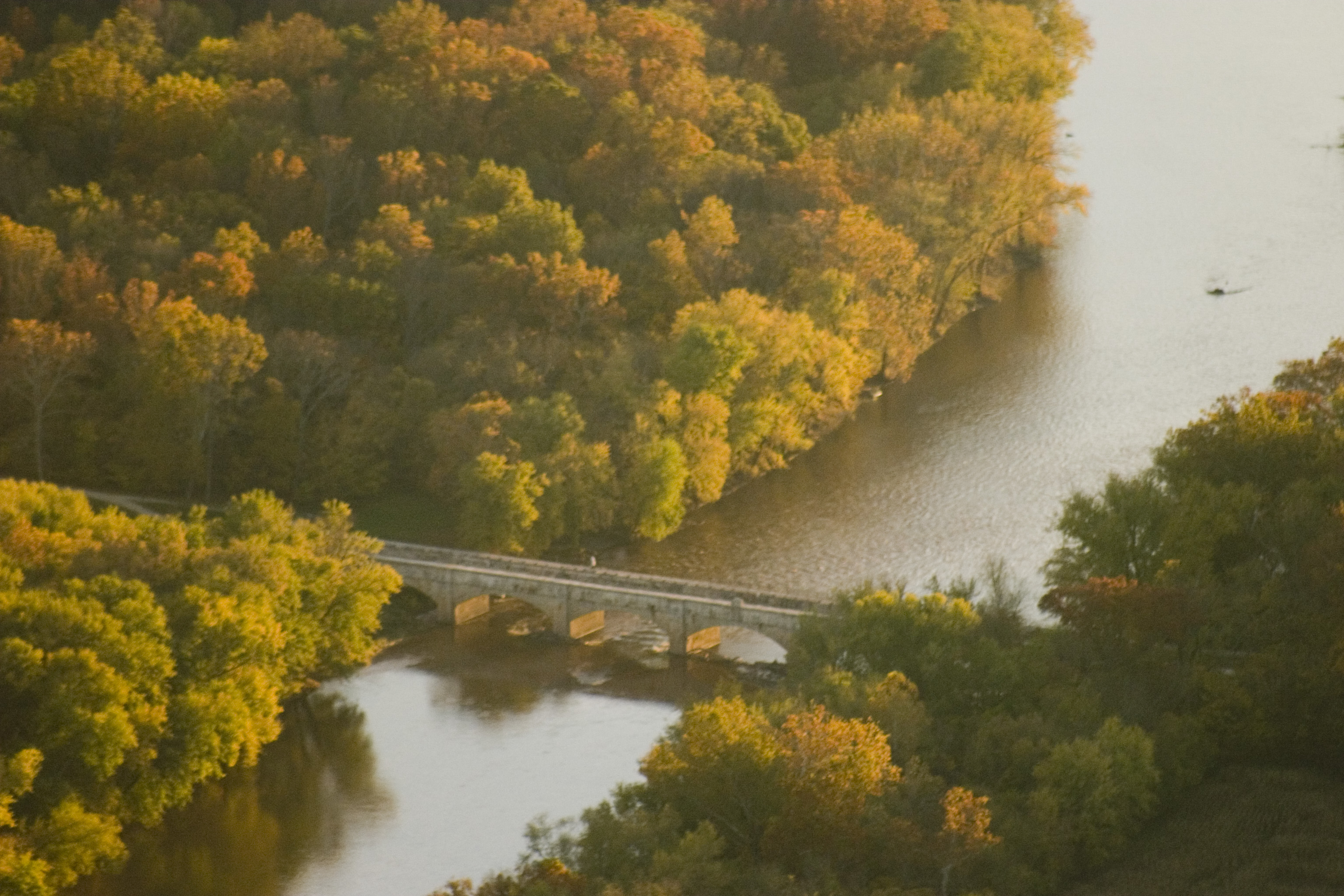
Monocacy Aqueduct from the air

The aqueduct is part of the C&O Canal National Historic Park and is administered by the National Park Service.

Following damage caused to several canal structures caused by Hurricane Agnes and other flooding incidents in the early 1970s, the National Park Service and the Federal Highway Administration designed a steel banding system to stabilize the structure and installed a steel rod reinforcing system. The National Park Service and park supporters were concerned about the structural stability of the aqueduct and a major engineering evaluation was undertaken to determine stabilization needs and associated cost. The C&O Canal National Historical Park and its partners restored the aqueduct to its original appearance in 2004-2005. The aqueduct was formally rededicated in May 2005.

== See also ==
- Aqueducts on the C&O Canal
