= Carroll Creek (Maryland) =

- Carroll Creek in Frederick, Maryland

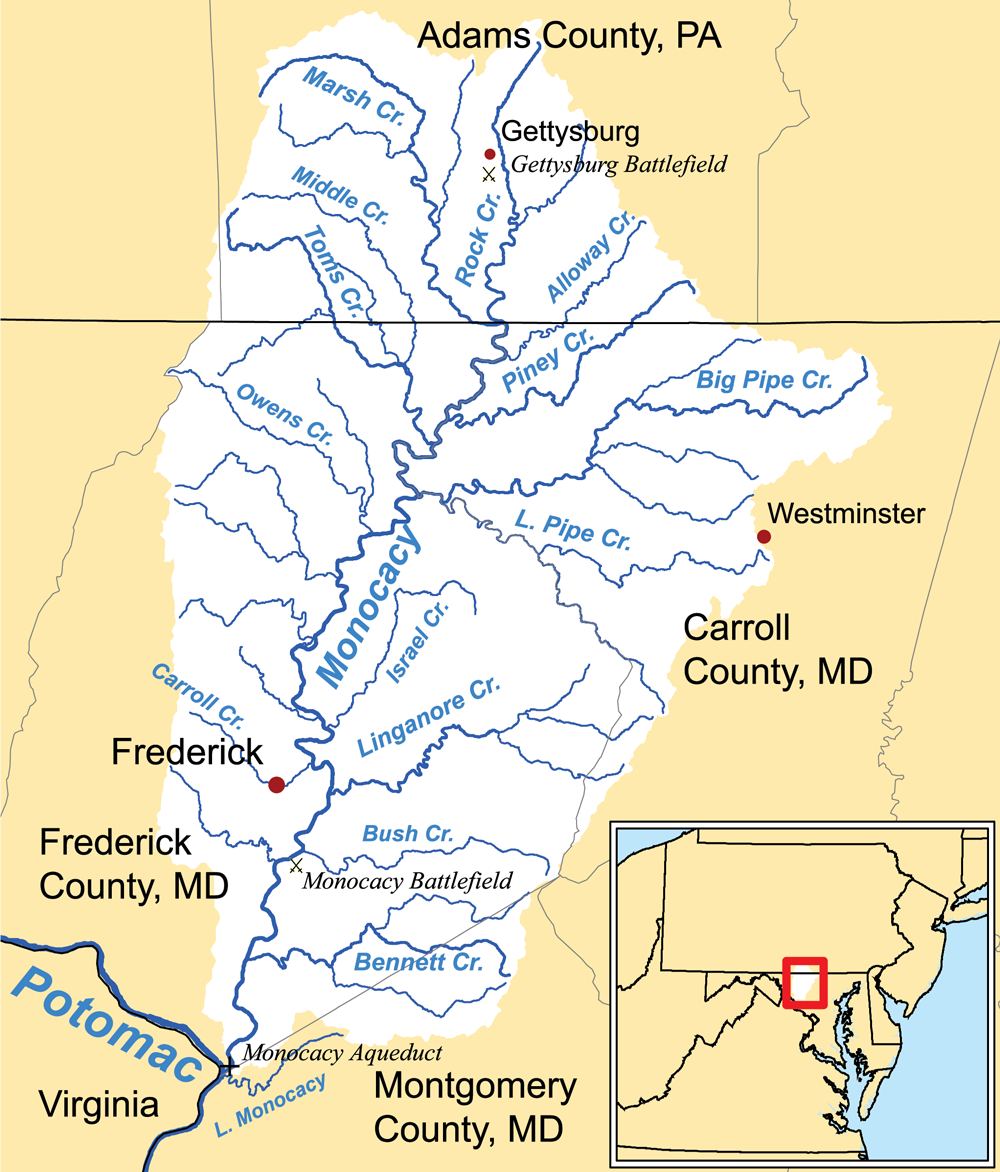
- Watershed map showing Carroll Creek
- Native name: Walkwaki Methtegui (Shawnee)

Location
- Country: United States
- State: Maryland
- Cities: Frederick, Tuscarora

Physical characteristics
- Source
  - location: Tuscarora, MD
  - coordinates: 39.461057°N 77.484649°W
- Mouth: Monocacy River
  - location: Frederick, MD
  - coordinates: 39.427029°N 77.379766°W
- Length: 8.3 mi (13.4 km)

Basin features
- Tributaries
  - left: Culler Lake
  - right: Rock Creek (Potomac River)

Carroll Creek is an 8.3-mile-long (13.4 km) tributary of the Monocacy River in Frederick County, Maryland. The headwaters of the creek are located on the eastern slopes of Catoctin Mountain, southeast of Gambrill State Park. The stream runs roughly east through the city of Frederick to the Monocacy, which drains to the Potomac River. The Shawnee Indians, who called the Monocacy River Monnockkesey (which translates as “river with many bends”), named Carroll Creek Walkwaki Methtegui, (which translates as "down in the gully creek").

The creek was named after Charles Carroll of Carrollton, a Founding Father of the United States who owned large amounts of land in Frederick County.

Following a flood in 1976, the City of Frederick undertook a flood control project to protect its downtown from future damage. The design called for the installation of an underground system of concrete conduits able to convey storm-water safely through downtown Frederick. The project’s ground-level elements allowed the development of a new linear park.

== See also ==
- List of Maryland rivers
