= Carroll County Almshouse and Farm =

- U.S. National Register of Historic Places
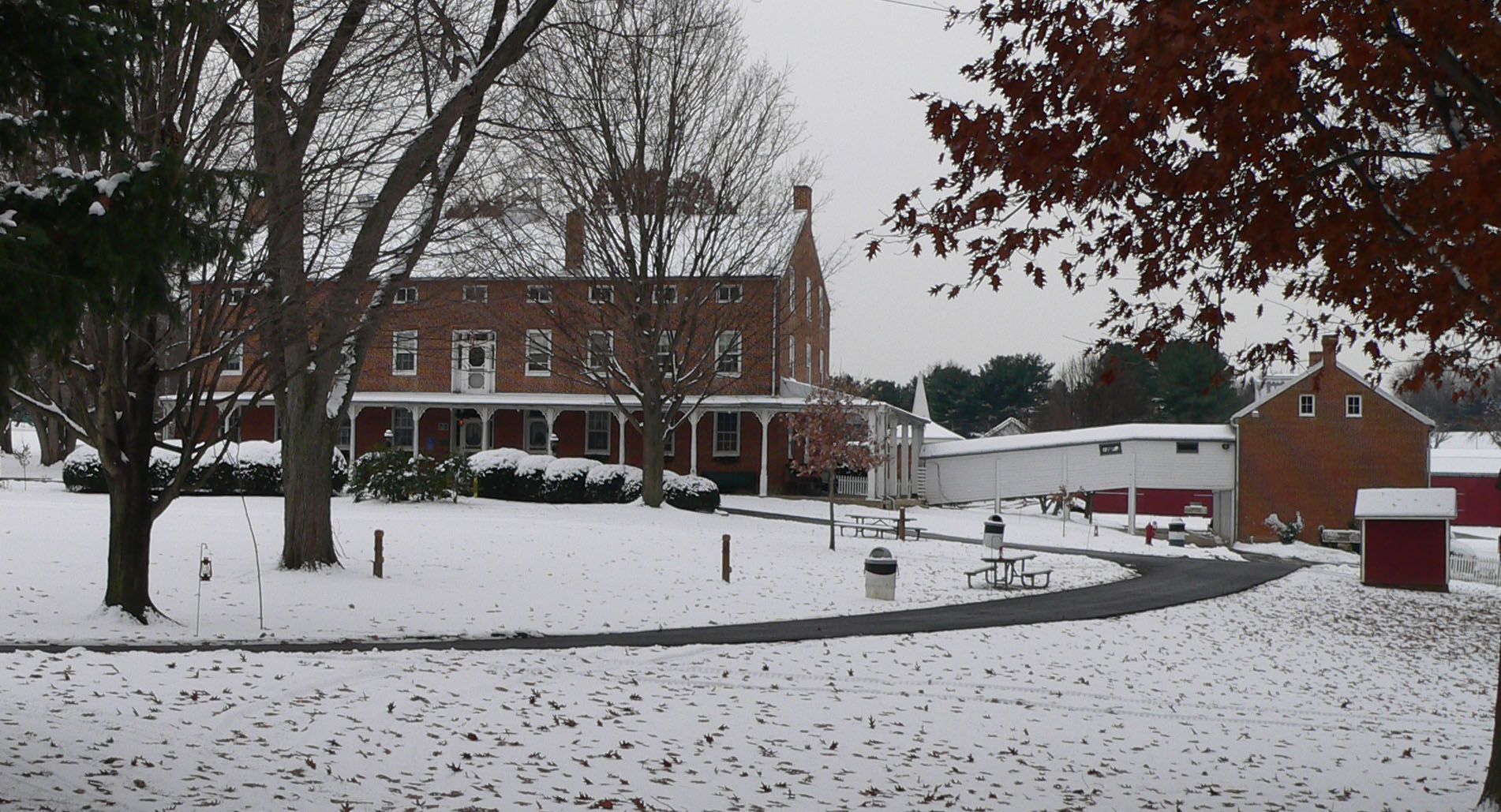
- Carroll County Almshouse and Men's Dormitory

- Location within Maryland Location within the United States
- Location: 500 S. Center St. Westminster, Maryland
- Coordinates: 39°33′30″N 76°59′44″W
- Area: 140 acres (57 ha)
- Built: 1852
- Architectural style: Gothic
- NRHP reference No.: 75000878
- Added to NRHP: December 4, 1975

Carroll County Almshouse and Farm, also known as the Carroll County Farm Museum, is a historic farm complex located at Westminster, Carroll County, Maryland. It consists of a complex of 15 buildings including the main house and dependencies. The 30-room brick main house was originally designed and constructed for use as the county almshouse. It is a long, three-story, rectangular structure, nine bays wide at the first- and second-floor levels of both front and rear façades. It features a simple frame cupola sheltering a farm bell. A separate two-story brick building with 14 rooms houses the original summer kitchen, wash room, and baking room, and may have once housed farm and domestic help. Also on the property is a brick, one-story dairy with a pyramidal roof dominated by a pointed finial of exaggerated height with Victorian Gothic "icing" decorating the eaves; a large frame and dressed stone bank barn; and a blacksmith's shop, spring house, smokehouse, ice house, and numerous other sheds and dependencies all used as a part of the working farm museum activities. The original Carroll County Almshouse was founded in 1852 and the Farm Museum was established in 1965.

It was listed on the National Register of Historic Places in 1975.

== Carroll County Farm Museum ==
The Carroll County Farm Museum provides the public with the opportunity to experience mid-19th century rural life. It was the first of its kind in Maryland; it opened its doors to the public for the first time on August 13, 1966. Exhibits support the Museum by presenting artifacts with appropriate interpretation, both to show how they once looked, and how they were utilized by farmers and their families in the history of agriculture in Carroll County. Visitors are given the opportunity to explore the collections of horse-powered machines and farm implements used for plowing, planting, and harvesting during the 19th century. The grounds include a croquet lawn, a fish pond, and an heirloom garden. The grounds have hosted the Maryland Wine Festival since 1985.

== See also ==
- Open-air museum
