= Linganore Farm =

Historic farm in Maryland, US

- U.S. National Register of Historic Places
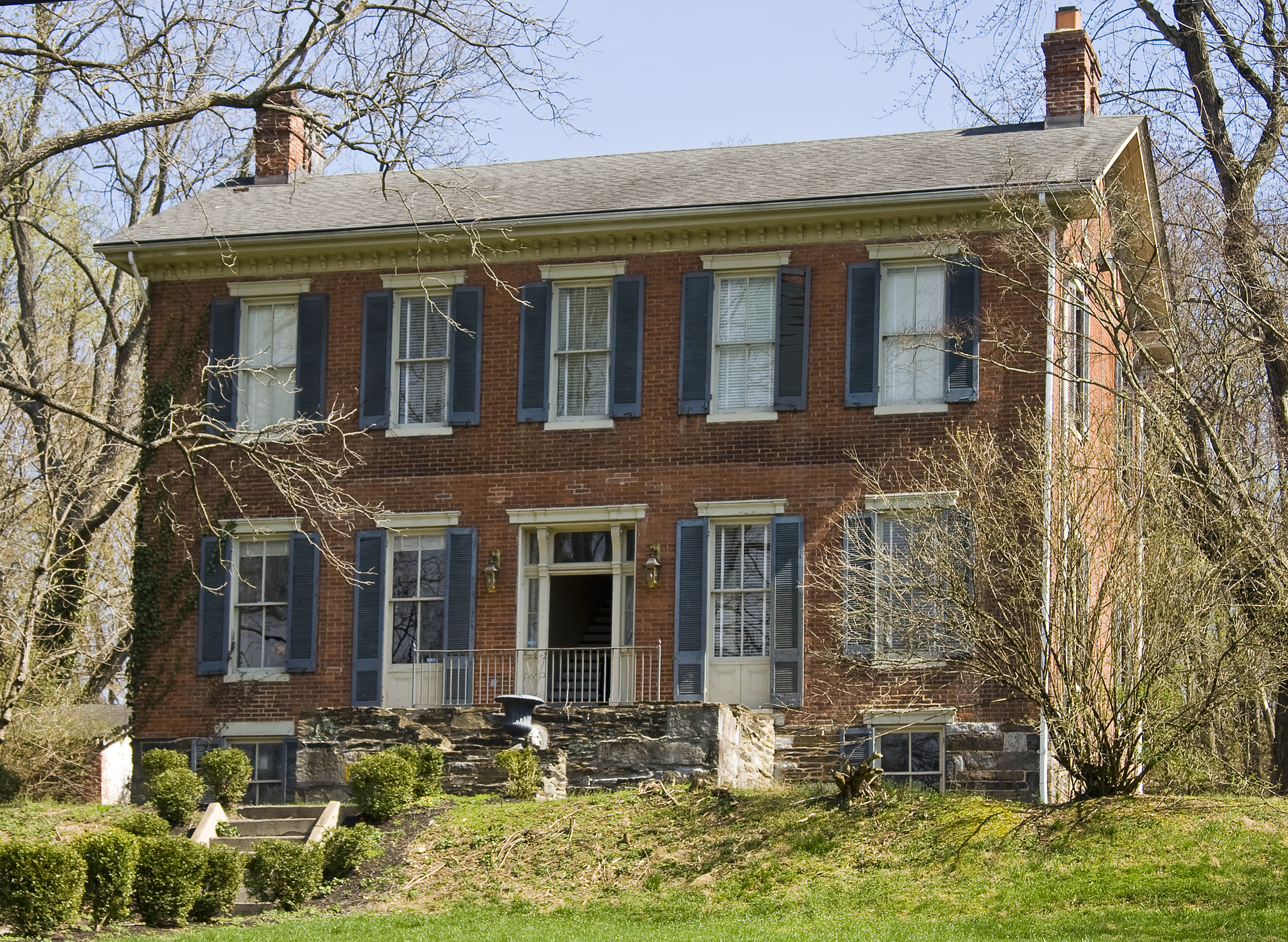

- Location within Maryland Location within the United States
- Location: 6229 Linganore Rd., Frederick, Maryland
- Coordinates: 39°24′21″N 77°21′42″W
- Area: 5 acres (2.0 ha)
- Architectural style: Federal, Greek Revival, Italianate
- NRHP reference No.: 00000429
- Added to NRHP: May 5, 2000

The Linganore Farm is a historic home and farm complex located at Frederick, Frederick County, Maryland, United States. The main house is a large two-story brick dwelling dating from the 1850s-60s and showing influence of the Greek Revival and Italianate styles. The property includes the ruins of a brick smokehouse, a stone root cellar and a two-story brick secondary house dating from the early 19th century. Across from the house is the site of the Linganore Mill, which was located on the east bank of the Monocacy River. In front of the house is a terraced lawn defined with large boxwoods. In 1891, the farm was converted to a resort known as the Linganore Hills Inn.

The Linganore Farm was listed on the National Register of Historic Places in 2000.
