= Cumberland Valley AVA =

American Viticultural Area in Pennsylvania and Maryland

Coordinates: 40°04′45″N 77°32′04″W

Cumberland Valley
- Wine region
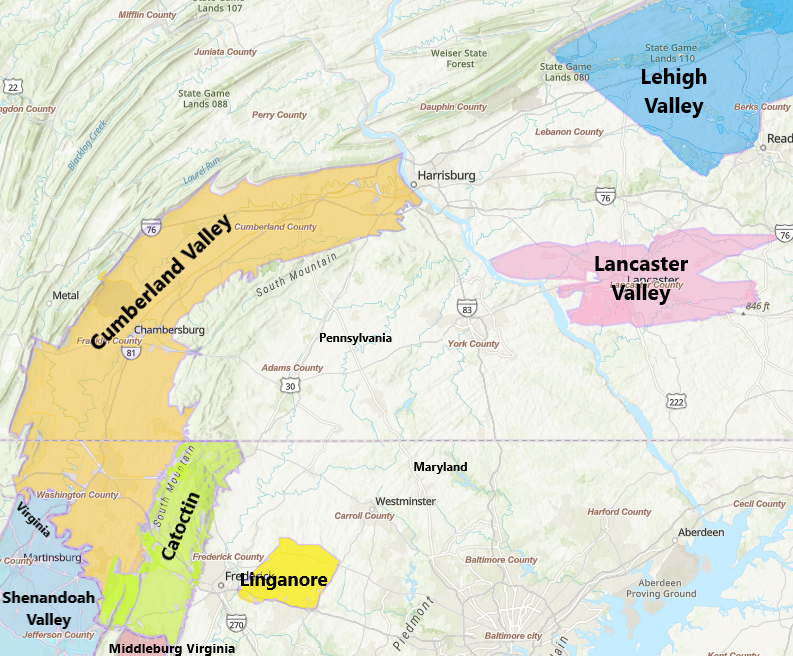
- Type: American Viticultural Area
- Year established: 1985
- Country: United States
- Part of: Maryland (MD), Pennsylvania (PA)
- Growing season: 160–170 days
- Climate region: Region II-III
- Heat units: 2,890-3,150 GDD units
- Precipitation (annual average): 34–40 in (860–1,020 mm)
- Soil conditions: MD: Murrill association underlain by limestone PA: Weathered shale, interbedded shale, siltstone and sandstone
- Total area: 765,000 acres (1,195 sq mi)
- Size of planted vineyards: MD: 20 acres (8.1 ha); PA: 40 acres (16 ha)
- No. of vineyards: 7
- No. of wineries: 3

Cumberland Valley is an American Viticultural Area (AVA) located in Washington County in west-central Maryland and Franklin and Cumberland counties in south-central Pennsylvania. It was established as the nation's 79^{th}, Maryland's third and Pennsylvania's fourth appellation on July 23, 1985 by the Bureau of Alcohol, Tobacco and Firearms (ATF), Treasury after reviewing the petition submitted by Mr. Robert W. Ziem, owner of Ziem Vineyards and bonded winery in Downsville, Maryland, and Mr. Charlie M. Webster of Sharpsburg, on behalf of themselves and local vintners, proposing a viticultural area to be known as "Cumberland Valley, Maryland."

The Cumberland Valley is an 80-mile (129 km) landform which bends in a northeasterly direction from the Potomac River in Washington County, Maryland, toward the Susquehanna River in Cumberland County, Pennsylvania. The valley is bordered on the southeast by South Mountain, which is the northernmost extension of the Blue Ridge Mountains, and on the northwest by the Allegheny Mountain complex. The principal streams that drain the valley are Conococheague Creek and Antietam Creek, tributaries of the Potomac River, and Conodoguinet Creek and Yellow Breeches Creek, tributaries of the Susquehanna River. The land drained by these streams shares similar geological history, topographical features, soils, and climatic conditions.

Initially, the submitted petition mapped an area which is more commonly known as the Hagerstown Valley, a portion of the larger Cumberland Valley which extends north above the Mason–Dixon line, the geopolitical boundary between the States of Maryland and Pennsylvania. In light of this determination, the petitioners agreed to amend the petition to include the portions of the Cumberland Valley which are located in Franklin and Cumberland counties in Pennsylvania and to petition for the name "Cumberland Valley." The AVA extends from the Potomac to the Susquehanna River.

About 100 acres (40 ha) of the AVA's 765,000 acres (1,195 sq mi) cultivate wine grapevines predominantly on high terraces overlooking the Potomac River and on the slopes of South Mountain. The soil in the area is alkaline limestone. At the outset, seven vineyards and three bonded wineries were documented in the petition.

== History ==
The name "Cumberland Valley" is well established by the petition. The area is known locally and nationally by the name "Cumberland Valley" and usage of the name is well documented. The valley was named in 1736 by the earliest settlers who came from Cumberland County, England. In 1751, the name was formally adopted when the northeast part of the valley was named Cumberland County and the Carlisle (PA) was named after its sister town of the same name in Cumberland. Today, numerous references to the name of the valley are made in industrial, business and organizational names.

== Terroir ==
=== Geology ===
The Cumberland Valley is an example of a mountain landscape that has been formed by erosion during a long interval of geologic time and that has reached a condition of dynamic equilibrium in which the adjustment between the landforms and the rocks beneath is nearly complete. The Cumberland Valley is a segment of the Great (Limestone) Valley, a long and fertile lowland trough, underlain by Cambrian and Ordovician limestone and shale, that extends along the axis of the Appalachian Highlands from the State of Alabama north into Canada. It is geologically well defined by South Mountain to the south and east and by the Allegheny Mountains to the west and north. The segment of the Great Valley lying to the northeast of the Cumberland Valley is known as the Lebanon Valley and the segment lying to the southwest is known as the Shenandoah Valley.

=== Topogrphy ===
The topography of the basin of the Cumberland Valley is nearly level. The basin of the valley is a gently rolling plain which at its western edge along the Potomac River is approximately 300 feet (91 m) above sea level and which over a distance of approximately 80 miles (130 km) gradually ascends to an average elevation of 600 feet (180 m) above sea level and then descends to an altitude of 300 feet (91 m) above sea level along the Susquehanna River. The valley floor has some areas of higher elevation, i.e., lowlying hills and ridges. The portions of the boundary to the northwest, north and southeast are higher due to the slopes of the mountains. The ridges and peaks of these mountains range from 1,000 to 2,100 feet (300–640 m) above sea level. The areas of higher elevation range from 700 to 1,600 feet (210–490 m) above the valley floor and include South Mountain (2,145 feet (654 m)) to the south and east of the valley floor, the Bear Pond Mountains (2,062 feet (628 m)), Cove Mountain (1,582 feet (482 m)), and Kittatinny Mountain (2,056 feet (627 m)) to the west and Blue Mountain to the north (2,000 feet (610 m)). Most of the land above 1,000 feet (300 m) in elevation along the southeastern portion of the boundary and above 700 feet (210 m) in elevation along the northern and western portions of the boundary is stony and unsuitable for agriculture, and consequently, remains forested.

=== Soils ===
The topography and soils of the Cumberland Valley result from the geology of the area. The valley is a limestone bed that has been weathered to a gently rolling plain. The valley lies at approximately 600 ft (180 m) above sea level between low mountains that rise to an elevation of about 2,000 ft (610 m) above sea level and belong to the easternmost fringes of the Appalachian Mountains. The mountains to the west, north and south of the valley are formed of sedimentary, metamorphic sedimentary, and igneous rocks while the valley is composed almost entirely of limestone. The soils found in the Cumberland Valley are typical of those derived from limestone. The Shenandoah and Lebanon valleys, respectively to the southwest and northeast, are contiguous segments of the Great (Limestone) Valley and bear soil characteristics similar to those of the Cumberland Valley. The soils in these valleys are deep, well drained, generally alkaline, and highly productive with a high moisture holding capacity whereas the mountains which border to the west, north and south, have soils generally of associations which are not as productive, deep, or well drained and which are acidic. The General Soil Map of Pennsylvania, prepared by the Pennsylvania State University in collaboration with the Soil Conservation Service of the U.S. Department of Agriculture, and the General Soil Map of Maryland, prepared by the University of Maryland in collaboration with the Soil Conservation Service of the U.S. Department of Agriculture, show that the soils suitable for agriculture in the Cumberland Valley can, in fact, be used to delineate the basin of the valley from the surrounding highlands. Data from the soil surveys for Washington County in Maryland and the counties of Franklin and Cumberland in Pennsylvania strongly support carrying the Cumberland Valley appellation all the way from the Potomac River to the Susquehanna River. The major soil associations found in the three counties which make up the Cumberland Valley are Berks, Hagerstown and Murrill and are distributed within the total land area of each county.

- Washington County, Maryland
  Soils of the Waynesboro association are found almost entirely on the high terraces along the Potomac River. The Waynesboro soils consist of very old, acid alluvium, mostly gravelly, which have been eroded from highland areas and deposited in rather thick beds above the Potomac River. These soils are well-drained, deep and medium-textured, but require liming in order to be productive for grapegrowing.
- Franklin County, Pennsylvania
  The land area of the county located primarily in the Great Limestone Valley. The principal soil associations in Franklin County are: Hagerstown-Duffield, Murrill-Laidig and Weikert-Berks-Bedington. The deep and well drained Hagerstown-Duffield soils make up about 32 percent of the land in the county and are found in the limestone valleys which are dedicated to crops, fruit, hay, and pasture.
- Cumberland County, Pennsylvania
  The Soil Conservation Service in Carlisle, Pennsylvania, furnished field data and a preliminary map which shows continuation into Cumberland County of the major soil types found in Washington and Franklin counties. The Hagerstown type soil (limestone) continues all the way to the floodplain of the Susquehanna River and the Murrill colluvial fans (sandstone over limestone) continue along the slopes of South Mountain.

=== Climate ===
Climate is a feature which differentiates the Cumberland Valley from surrounding areas. Because of the location of the Allegheny Mountain complex to the west and north and South Mountain to the south, as well as the movement of warm, moist air northward from the Gulf of Mexico over the basin of the Great (Limestone) Valley, the climate, including average temperature and precipitation, is relatively uniform throughout the Cumberland Valley. The valley lies in an area of prevailing westerly winds which originate in the interior of North America. Warm, moist air from the Gulf of Mexico flows northward along the basin of the Great (Limestone) Valley into the Cumberland Valley. In addition, the Atlantic Ocean to the east is a modifying factor and an occasional source of warmth and moisture. These conditions give a "Humid Continental" type of climate, typical of the Middle Atlantic States. Most weather systems that affect this area originate in Canada or on the Central Plains of the United States, are caught up in the prevailing westerly flow aloft, move eastward over the Appalachian Mountains, and lose moisture in the form of precipitation over the basin of the valley. By the time an air mass has passed over the Appalachian chain, it is considerably modified in both temperature and moisture. After cooling and losing moisture while traversing the mountains, an air mass tends to warm and at least partly replenish its moisture supply over the valley. Orographic uplift along the windward side of South Mountain, which forms the eastern portion of the border of the viticultural area, results in increased cloudiness and the greatest precipitation along this eastern ridge. Annual temperatures generally average near 53 °F (12 °C) over the Cumberland Valley but at higher elevations along the western and eastern borders average two to three degrees lower. Precipitation also follows topographical features; the annual average is 40 inches (1,000 mm) in the western mountain and valley region and approximately 45 inches (1,100 mm) in the South Mountain region. The lower totals along the western border are due to the drying of the air mass over the mountains farther west and the lack of a moisture source. Average temperature and precipitation are relatively consistent throughout the valley. In addition to the data obtained by the petitioners from weather stations within and outside the boundary of the petitioned area, ATF found evidence presented in the notices and Treasury decisions for the Catoctin, Lancaster Valley and Shenandoah Valley viticultural areas that documents the climatological differences between the Cumberland Valley and surrounding areas.
The climate of the Catoctin viticultural area which lies to the south of the Cumberland Valley has an average annual rainfall of 36–42 inches (910–1,070 mm), temperatures of 50–55 °F (10–13 °C), and a frost-free season of 160–170 days. The Lancaster Valley viticultural area to the southeast of the Cumberland viticultural area has an average annual rainfall of 40–42 inches (1,000–1,100 mm), temperatures of 55–60 °F (13–16 °C), and a frost-free season of 170–180 days. The Shenandoah Valley viticultural area to the southwest of the Cumberland Valley has an average annual rainfall of 34–38 inches (860–970 mm), temperatures of 54–56 °F (12–13 °C), and a frost-free season of 150–160 days.
The petitioners cite data from three weather stations of the National Oceanic and Atmospheric Administration, U.S. Department of Commerce, specifically, the stations at Chewsville (elev. 640 feet (200 m)) located near Hagerstown (MD) at the southern end of the valley, Chambersburg (PA) located centrally (elev. 570 feet (170 m)), and Carlisle (PA) located in the northeastern end of the valley (elev. 465 feet (142 m)). These stations show average temperatures ranging from 51.6–53.4 °F (10.9–11.9 °C), total precipitation from 34.9–39.8 inches (890–1,010 mm), and degree growing days of 3,050 at Chewsville, 2,890 at Chambersburg, and 3,150 at Carlisle.
The average annual temperature is 52 °F (11 °C) with the coldest month being January (32 °F (0 °C)) and the warmest month being July (75 °F (24 °C)). Based upon data recorded at Chambersburg, annual precipitation averaging 38.25 inches (972 mm) occurred fairly evenly throughout the 30-year period from 1931 to 1960. In summer, several periods of hot and humid weather are observed, however, and valley temperatures reach into the nineties about 30 times during summer. On the average, daytime highs reach the middle to upper eighties and nighttime lows are near 60. Temperatures in the mountains are lower. Freezing temperatures have not been experienced during summer in the valley. Cloud cover is at a minimum in summer; the valley receives more than 60 percent of the available sunshine, and nights are generally clear. The prevailing wind is from the southwest and averages 8 mi (13 km) per hour. Rainfall is generally adequate but dry periods of 2 to 3 weeks duration are sometimes experienced. Summer rainfall is usually in the form of afternoon and evening thundershowers, which occur on an average of 24 days during the months of June, July and August. The length of the growing season is fairly consistent over the valley and averages 160 to 170 days. Frost occurs as late as mid-May and as early as mid-September. A shorter growing season exists in the mountains. About 57 percent of the annual precipitation falls during spring and summer. Cumberland Valley mainly has a hot-summer humid continental climate (Dfa) and is in the plant hardiness zone range from 6b to 7b.
