= Bartonsville, Maryland =

- Census-designated place
- Location in Maryland Bartonsville (the United States)
- Coordinates: 39°23′21″N 77°21′45″W
- Country: United States
- State: Maryland
- County: Frederick

Area
  - Total: 2.14 sq mi (5.55 km^{2})
  - Land: 2.14 sq mi (5.53 km^{2})
  - Water: 0.0077 sq mi (0.02 km^{2})
- Elevation: 446 ft (136 m)

Population (2020)
  - Total: 2,753
  - Density: 1,288.7/sq mi (497.58/km^{2})
- Time zone: UTC−5 (Eastern (EST))
  - Summer (DST): UTC−4 (EDT)
- Area codes: 301 and 240
- FIPS code: 24-04650
- GNIS feature ID: 2583578

Bartonsville is an unincorporated community and census-designated place (CDP) in Frederick County, in the U.S. state of Maryland. As of the 2020 census it had a population of 2,753. Prior to 2010, the area was part of the Linganore-Bartonsville CDP.

== Geography ==
The community is in southeastern Frederick County, bordered to the north by Maryland Route 144 (Old National Pike), to the east by Ijamsville Road, and to the west by the Monocacy River. Via MD 144, the city of Frederick is 3.5 miles (5.6 km) to the west.

According to the U.S. Census Bureau, the Bartonsville CDP has a total area of 2.64 square miles (6.84 km^{2}), of which 2.61 square miles (6.76 km^{2}) is land and 0.03 square miles (0.08 km^{2}), or 1.11%, is water.

== Demographics ==
Historical population
Census	Pop.	Note	%±
2020	2,753		—
U.S. Decennial Census

=== 2020 census ===
As of the 2020 census, Bartonsville had a population of 2,753. The median age was 35.0 years. 28.4% of residents were under the age of 18 and 9.3% of residents were 65 years of age or older. For every 100 females there were 96.4 males, and for every 100 females age 18 and over there were 96.2 males age 18 and over.

96.5% of residents lived in urban areas, while 3.5% lived in rural areas.

There were 893 households in Bartonsville, of which 44.7% had children under the age of 18 living in them. Of all households, 69.1% were married-couple households, 12.0% were households with a male householder and no spouse or partner present, and 13.5% were households with a female householder and no spouse or partner present. About 11.8% of all households were made up of individuals and 5.0% had someone living alone who was 65 years of age or older.

There were 940 housing units, of which 5.0% were vacant. The homeowner vacancy rate was 2.3% and the rental vacancy rate was 4.9%.

Racial composition as of the 2020 census
Race	Number	Percent
White	1,718	62.4%
Black or African American	381	13.8%
American Indian and Alaska Native	7	0.3%
Asian	252	9.2%
Native Hawaiian and Other Pacific Islander	4	0.1%
Some other race	125	4.5%
Two or more races	266	9.7%
Hispanic or Latino (of any race)	307	11.2%

== Education ==
It is in Frederick County Public Schools.

School zoning is as follows: Residents are zoned to Linganore Creek Elementary School, Oakdale Middle School, and Oakdale High School.

== Notable person ==
- Lester Bowie, jazz trumpeter born in Bartonsville
