= Lake Linganore, Maryland =

Coordinates: 39°24′54″N 77°18′22″W

- Unincorporated area
- Interactive map of Lake Linganore, Maryland
- Country: United States
- State: Maryland
- County: Frederick

Lake Linganore is a lake in Frederick County, in the U.S. state of Maryland, located just outside New Market. The population was 12,351 as of the 2020 census.

== Community ==
Lake Linganore consists of approximately 5,000 properties over 4,000 acres. They are subdivided into 15 "villages" centered on four man-made lakes: Lake Anita Louise, Lake Merle, Lake Marion, and the centerpiece of the community, Lake Linganore, a 210-acre (85 ha) reservoir built on Linganore Creek. The largest privately owned lake in the state, access to Lake Linganore is private, with amenities including two sand beaches ( Coldstream Beach, and Nightingale Beach) as well as over 30 miles of largely wooded trails. One-third of the community is reserved as open space. The community is managed by the Lake Linganore Association.

Population statistics for the area are tracked by the U.S. Census Bureau within the Linganore census-designated place.

== History ==
Constructed in 1968 as a "new town" by then developer Linganore Corporation (J. William Brosius and Louie J. Brosius), Linganore was Frederick County's first planned unit development, with an emphasis on "building in sympathy with the land and preserving the natural environment." The first villages featured small cottage-style homes on narrow, winding roads meant to blend into the landscape. Later construction focused on contemporary house styles—including townhouses and luxury estates—with wider streets and sidewalks. Construction is expected to be completed by 2030 with 6,400 homes.
