= Linganore-Bartonsville, Maryland =

- Former Census-designated place
- Location of Linganore-Bartonsville, Maryland
- Coordinates: 39°24′31″N 77°19′26″W
- Country: United States
- State: Maryland
- County: Frederick

Area
  - Total: 16.4 sq mi (42.5 km^{2})
  - Land: 16.1 sq mi (41.7 km^{2})
  - Water: 0.31 sq mi (0.8 km^{2})

Population (2000)
  - Total: 12,529
  - Density: 777/sq mi (300.1/km^{2})
- Time zone: UTC−5 (Eastern (EST))
  - Summer (DST): UTC−4 (EDT)
- FIPS code: 24-47043

Linganore-Bartonsville was a census-designated place (CDP) in Frederick County, Maryland, United States, for the 2000 census, at which time its population was 12,529. For the 2010 census the area was split into three CDPs: Linganore, Bartonsville, and Spring Ridge.

== Geography ==
Linganore-Bartonsville is located at 39°24′31″N 77°19′26″W (39.408668, −77.323795).

According to the United States Census Bureau, the CDP had a total area of 16.4 square miles (42 km^{2}), of which, 16.1 square miles (42 km^{2}) of it is land and 0.3 square miles (0.78 km^{2}) of it (1.83%) is water.

== Demographics ==
Historical population
Census	Pop.	Note	%±
1990	4,079		—
2000	12,529		207.2%

As of the census of 2000, there were 12,529 people, 4,140 households, and 3,456 families residing in the CDP. The population density was 777.3 inhabitants per square mile (300.1/km^{2}). There were 4,273 housing units at an average density of 265.1 per square mile (102.4/km^{2}). The racial makeup of the CDP was 93.12% White, 3.28% African American, 0.21% Native American, 1.35% Asian, 0.05% Pacific Islander, 0.54% from other races, and 1.45% from two or more races. Hispanic or Latino of any race were 2.16% of the population.

There were 4,140 households, out of which 52.7% had children under the age of 18 living with them, 72.3% were married couples living together, 7.6% had a female householder with no husband present, and 16.5% were non-families. 12.3% of all households were made up of individuals, and 2.5% had someone living alone who was 65 years of age or older. The average household size was 3.03 and the average family size was 3.31.

In the CDP, the population was spread out, with 34.1% under the age of 18, 4.3% from 18 to 24, 39.2% from 25 to 44, 17.5% from 45 to 64, and 5.0% who were 65 years of age or older. The median age was 33 years. For every 100 females, there were 99.5 males. For every 100 females age 18 and over, there were 96.1 males.

The median income for a household in the CDP was $76,842, and the median income for a family was $80,523. Males had a median income of $56,037 versus $36,891 for females. The per capita income for the CDP was $29,390. About 1.8% of families and 2.5% of the population were below the poverty line, including 3.4% of those under age 18 and 3.3% of those age 65 or over.
