= Linganore Creek =

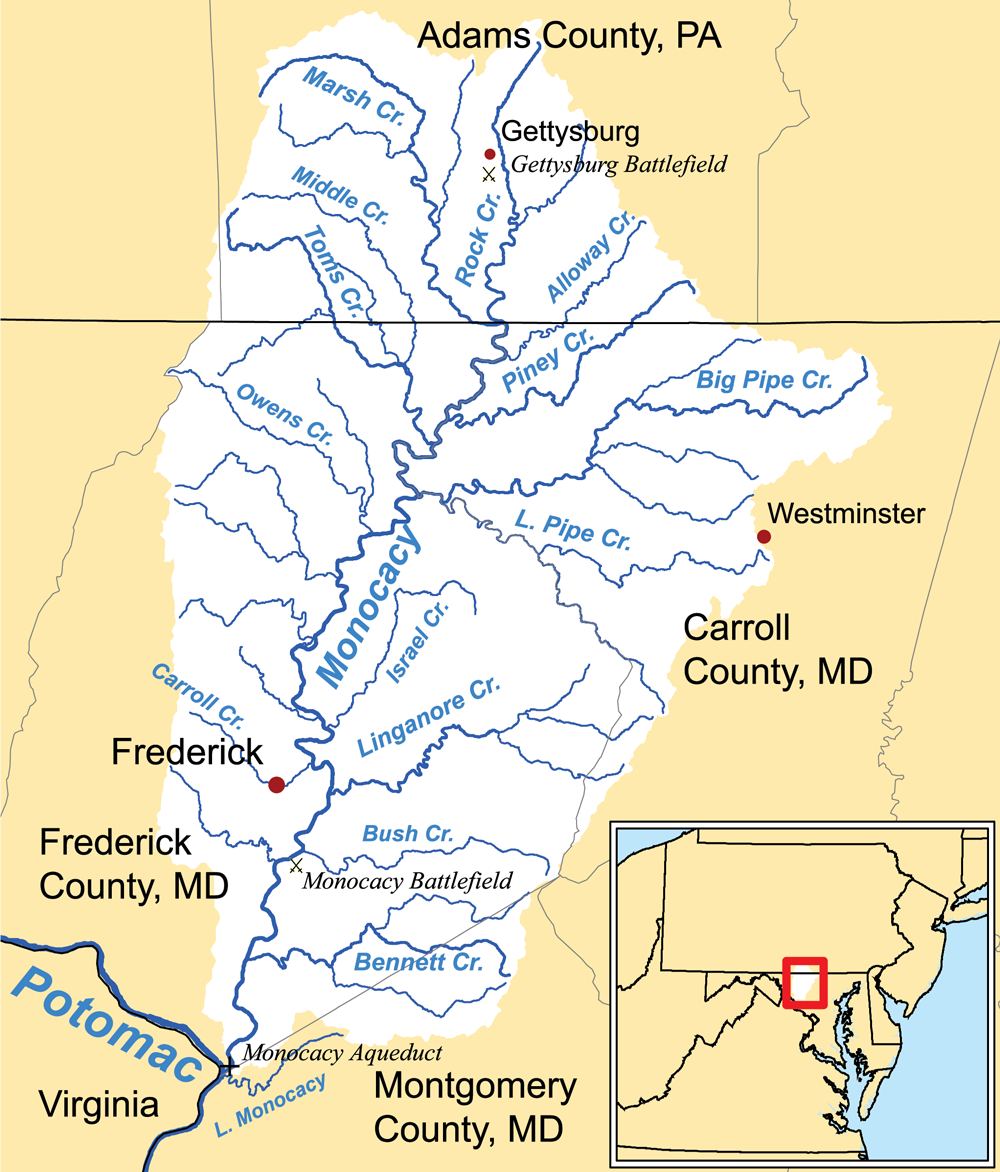
- Watershed map showing Linganore Creek

Location
- Country: United States
- State: Maryland
- Region: Western Maryland
- Cities: Frederick, New Market, Mount Airy

Physical characteristics
- Source
  - location: Church Creek, Maryland
- Mouth: Monocacy River
  - location: Frederick, MD
  - elevation: 0 ft (0 m)

Basin features
- Tributaries
  - left: Bens Branch, Spicer Creek, North Fork Linganore Creek
  - right: Town Branch, Dollyhyde Creek, South Fork Linganore Creek

Linganore Creek is a 13.5-mile-long (21.7 km) tributary of the Monocacy River in Frederick County, Maryland. The stream is formed from the confluence of the north and south forks of the Linganore (39.4489911°N 77.2216489°W), about 10 miles (16 km) east-northeast of the city of Frederick. The creek runs roughly southwest to the Monocacy River, which in turn drains into the Potomac River. The watershed area of the creek is 83.1 square miles (215 km^{2}). High water in the creek can result in flooding of Gas House Pike, an east–west road running between Monocacy Boulevard and Green Valley Road.

The name "linganore" purportedly means "left ear" (of the Potomac), a name coined by an American Indian chief who once lived on the banks of the waterway.

== Lake Linganore ==
Lake Linganore, an impoundment built on the creek about 4 miles (6 km) east of Frederick, is the principal source of drinking water for the city. It is also a drinking water source for the central portion of Frederick County. The community of Lake Linganore takes its name from the lake.

== See also ==
- List of Maryland rivers

Feature	Coordinates
Linganore Creek	39.407325°N 77.365263°W
Lake Linganore	39.4143954°N 77.2943722°W
confluence of the north and south forks of the Linganore	39.4489911°N 77.2216489°W
