= Monocacy River =

River in Maryland, United States

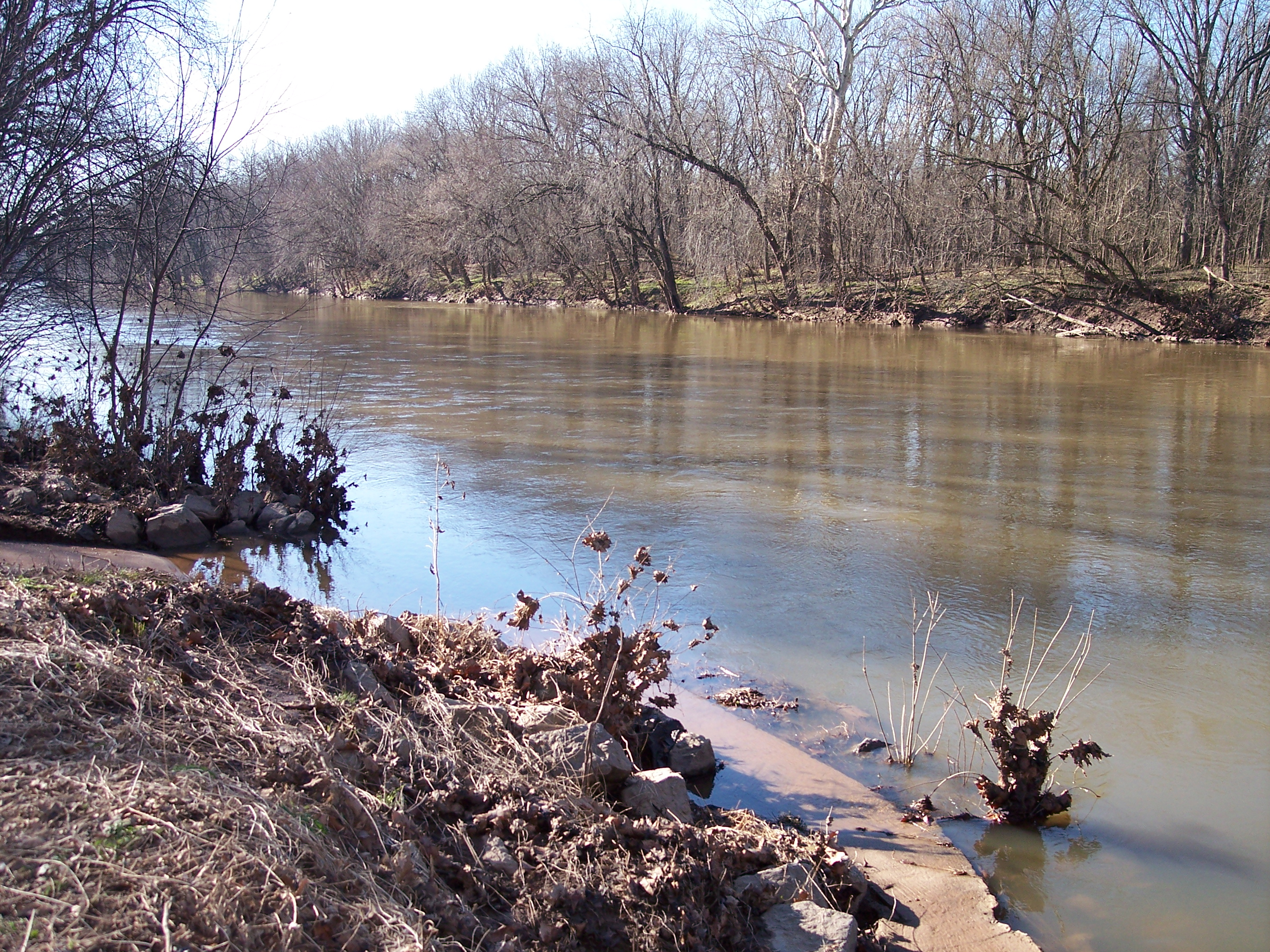
- Monocacy River near Frederick, Maryland in 2007

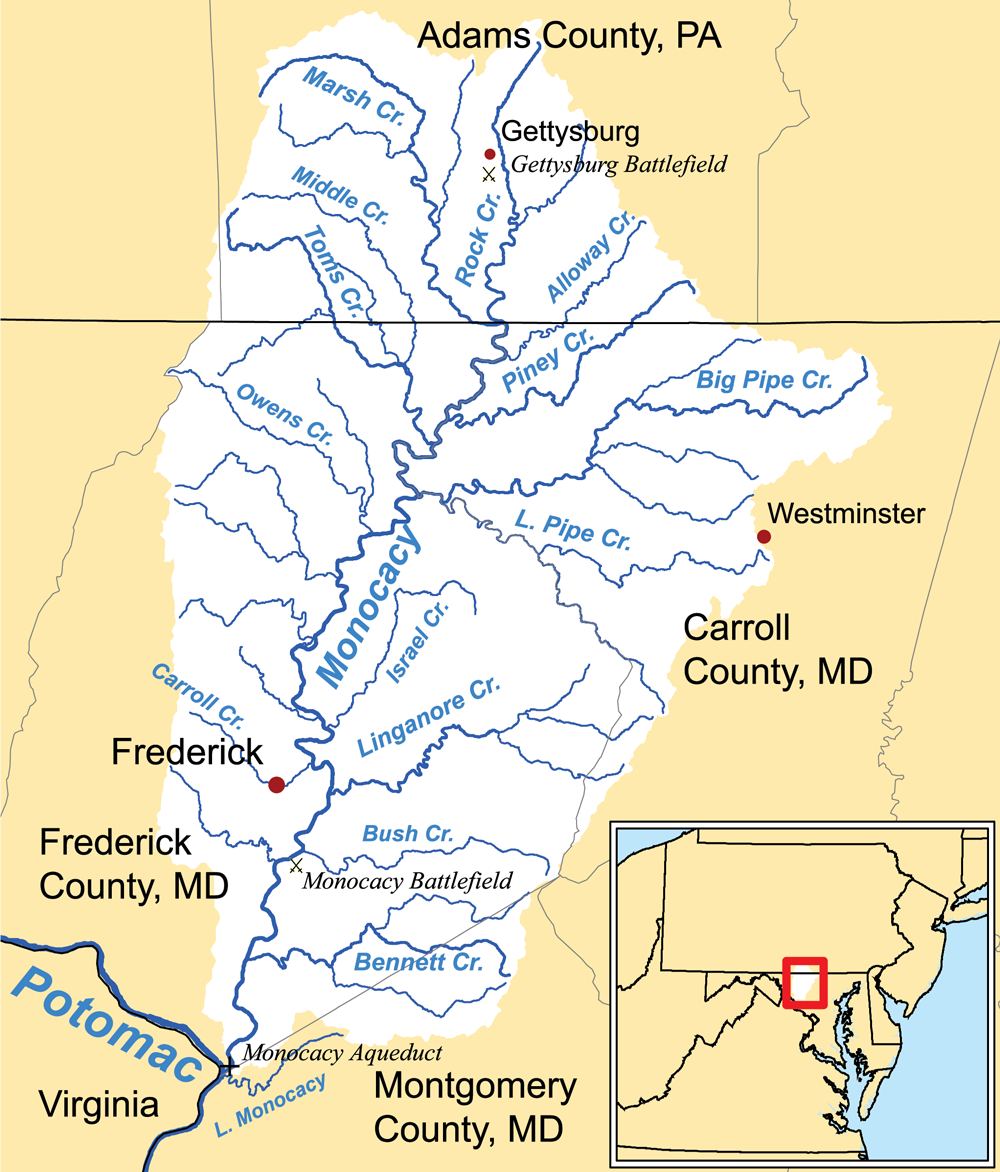
- The Monocacy River watershed
- Native name: Monnockkesey (Shawnee)

Location
- Country: United States
- State: Maryland
- County: Frederick Carroll

Physical characteristics
- Source
  - location: Harney, Carroll County, Maryland, United States
  - coordinates: 39°43′11″N 77°13′03″W
  - elevation: 400 ft (120 m)
- Mouth: Potomac River
  - location: Dickerson, Maryland, United States
  - coordinates: 39°13′22″N 77°27′15″W
  - elevation: 200 ft (61 m)
- Length: 58 mi (93 km)
- Basin size: 970 sq mi (2,500 km^{2})
- Discharge
  - location: Frederick
  - average: 1,550 cu ft/s (44 m^{3}/s)
  - minimum: 573 cu ft/s (16.2 m^{3}/s)
  - maximum: 3,060 cu ft/s (87 m^{3}/s)
- Discharge
  - location: Bridgeport, Frederick; County, Maryland
  - average: 400 cu ft/s (11 m^{3}/s)

Basin features
- Tributaries
  - left: Piney Creek, Double Pipe Creek, Israel Creek, Linganore Creek, Furnace Branch
  - right: Toms Creek, Tuscarora Creek, Carroll Creek, Ballenger Creek

The Monocacy River (/məˈnɒkəsi/) is a free-flowing left tributary to the Potomac River, which empties into the Atlantic Ocean via the Chesapeake Bay. The river is 58.5 miles (94.1 km) long, with a drainage area of about 970 square miles (2,500 km^{2}). It is the largest Maryland tributary to the Potomac. There is a state managed 1,800 acre Monocacy River Natural Resources Area open to the public and is used for hunting.

The name "Monocacy" comes from the Shawnee name for the river Monnockkesey, which translates to "river with many bends." (However, another local tradition asserts that "Monocacy" means "well-fenced garden" in an Indian language.)

The Monocacy National Battlefield lies alongside part of the river, marking an 1864 engagement during the American Civil War, the Battle of Monocacy Junction. The Chesapeake and Ohio Canal crosses over the river at the Monocacy Aqueduct, the largest of the 11 aqueducts on the canal.

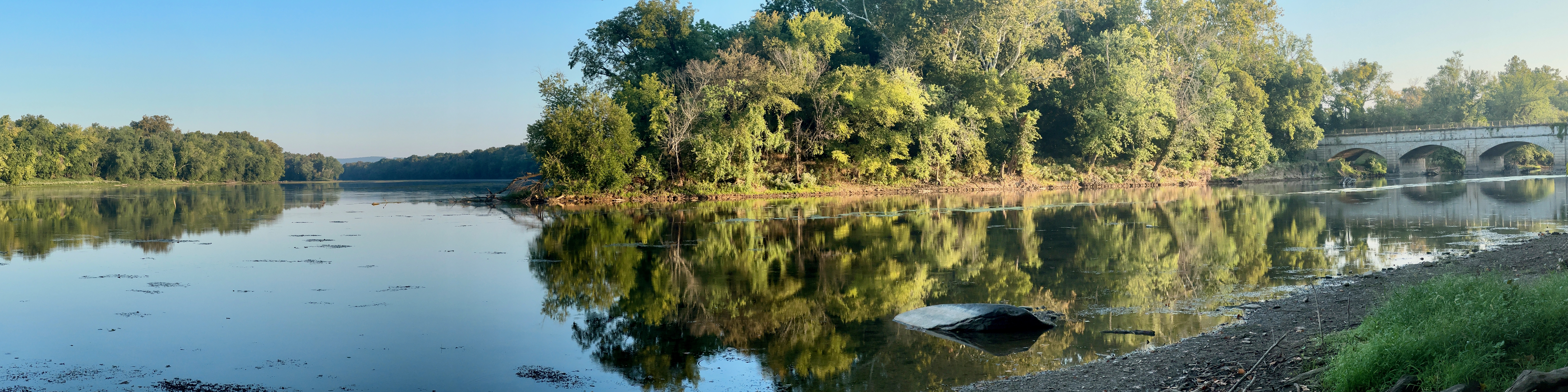
Confluence of Monocacy and Potomac Rivers by the Monocacy Aqueduct

== Geography ==
The river rises in Carroll County, Maryland, west of the unincorporated town of Harney at the Maryland-Pennsylvania border. The river is formed by the confluence of Marsh Creek and Rock Creek, which flow out of Adams County, Pennsylvania. Maryland tributaries include Furnace Branch, Tuscarora Creek, Carroll Creek, Linganore Creek and Ballenger Creek in Frederick County and Double Pipe Creek in Carroll County; other Pennsylvania tributaries include Alloway Creek and Toms Creek in Adams County.

About 60% of the Monocacy watershed is dedicated to agricultural use; about 33% of the watershed is forested. The city of Frederick and its suburbs form the largest urban area within the watershed.

The 970 square mile watershed averages a flow of 600 million gallons per day (Mgal/d) at the mouth where it enters the Potomac River.

=== Dendrology ===
The vegetation of the watershed is very similar to what one would expect to find through the Piedmont and valley and ridge regions, with some invasive species that threaten the balance of the ecosystem.

== Pollution ==
The State of Maryland designated the Monocacy as a Maryland Scenic River in 1974. However, it has one of the greatest nonpoint source pollution problems in the state due in large part to runoff from the 3,500 farms, livestock operations, and dairies in the watershed. The Maryland Department of the Environment (MDE) has listed the Monocacy with impaired water quality for nutrient pollution, sediment, and fecal coliform bacteria. A major tributary basin, the Double Pipe Creek watershed, is also impaired by these pollutants. A 2012 MDE report said that fish and other aquatic life in the river were severely impacted by pollution and loss of habitat.

Some farmers in the Monocacy watershed participate in the national Conservation Stewardship Program operated by the Natural Resources Conservation Service, part of the U.S. Department of Agriculture (USDA), designed to help stem pollution due to erosion and pollutant runoff from farming. In the 1990s the watershed was part of a national water quality demonstration project sponsored by USDA, which helped farmers reduce fertilizer usage and reduced discharges of nitrogen and phosphorus to the river.

== See also ==
- List of Maryland rivers
- List of rivers of Pennsylvania
