= List of roads in Carroll County, Maryland =

== B ==
Road	Route	Places	Landmarks	Notes
Bachmans Valley Road	Littlestown Pike to Hanover Pike (continues as Wentz Road)	Westminster; Manchester		
Baltimore Boulevard	New Windsor Road to Baltimore County line	Westminster; Finksburg	Carroll Christian Schools	MD-140 is known as Westminster Pike in Baltimore County, then changes names as it crosses Patapsco River into Carroll County. It runs parallel to Old Westminster Pike most of the way to Westminster.
Baust Church Road	Old Taneytown Road to Trevanion Road	Uniontown		
Black Rock Road	Hanover Pike to Falls Road (in Baltimore County)	Hampstead		Designated as MD-833 from Gill Avenue to Lower Beckleysville Road, then MD-88 from Lower Beckleysville Road to Falls Road.

== C ==
Road	Route	Places	Landmarks	Notes
Clear Ridge Road	Middleburg Road to Green Valley Road	Uniontown		

== D ==
Road	Route	Places	Landmarks	Notes
Deer Park Road	Sykesville Road to Ivy Mill Road (in Baltimore County)	Finksburg	Liberty Reservoir	See also Deer Park Road in Baltimore County

== E ==
Road	Route	Places	Landmarks	Notes
Emory Road	Old Hanover Road to Baltimore Boulevard (continues as Gamber Road)	Finksburg; Upperco		

== F ==
Road	Route	Places	Landmarks	Notes
Francis Scott Key Highway	Mason–Dixon line to Woodsboro Pike	Taneytown; Keymar		Changes name from "Francis Scott Key Highway" to "Woodsboro Pike" just south of Keymar.

== G ==
Road	Route	Places	Landmarks	Notes
Gamber Road	Sykesville Road to Baltimore Boulevard (continues as Emory Road	Gamber; Finksburg		
Green Valley Road	Manning Drive to Urbana Pike (in Frederick County	New Windsor; Union Bridge; Johnsville		Continues as Main Street (New Windsor) in New Windsor. Also known as Main Street in Union Bridge.

== H ==
Road	Route	Places	Landmarks	Notes
Hampstead Mexico Road	Manchester Road to Main Street	Hampstead		Continues west of Manchester Road as Guadelupe Drive, and east of Main Street as Fairmount Road.
Hanover Pike	14500 Block of MD-30 in Baltimore County to Mason–Dixon line	Hampstead; Manchester		North of the Mason–Dixon line, continues as Pennsylvania Route 94, known as "Baltimore Pike." South of the 14500 block, is known as "Hanover Road." Known as "Main Street" in Hampstead and Manchester.

== L ==
Road	Route	Places	Landmarks	Notes
Liberty Road	Kelox Road (in Baltimore County) to US-15 (in Frederick County)	Eldersburg; Taylorsville		
Lineboro Road	Hanover Pike to Church Street			Continues as Main Street in Lineboro
Littlestown Pike	Baltimore Boulevard interchange to Mason–Dixon line	Westminster; Union Mills; Silver Run	Carroll County Regional Airport	Continues north of Mason–Dixon line as Pennsylvania Route 97, known as "Baltimore Pike." Continues south of MD-140 (Baltimore Boulevard) interchange as Pennsylvania Avenue. MD-97 continues east of this interchange as a combined route with MD-140, then continues in a southbound direction as Malcolm Drive off Baltimore Boulevard.
Lower Beckleysville Road	Main Street to Mt. Carmel Road	Hampstead		Changes directly into Mt. Carmel Road when headed eastbound. Continues west of Main Street as Houcksville Road.

== M ==
Road	Route	Places	Landmarks	Notes
Main Street (Hampstead)	Black Rock Road to Ralph Avenue	Hampstead		Main Street is the name of MD-30, otherwise known as Hanover Pike, in Hampstead and Manchester.
Main Street (Manchester)		Manchester		Main Street is the name of MD-30, otherwise known as Hanover Pike, in Hampstead and Manchester
Main Street (Mt. Airy)	Dead end north of Candice Drive to Ridge Road (in Howard County)	Mt. Airy		
Main Street (New Windsor)	Springdale Road to Old Windsor Road	New Windsor		
Main Street (Union Bridge)				
Main Street (Westminster)	West Main starts at a dead-end stub that appears to have once directly connected to MD-140. Access from Route 140 is provided via WMC Drive. Continues to MD-97 (as East Main).	Westminster		Changes from West Main Street to East Main Street at downtown intersection with MD-27. Beyond MD-97, changes name to Old Westminster Pike.
Malcolm Drive				
Manchester Road				
Marriottsville Road				
Marston Road				

== N ==
Road	Route	Places	Landmarks	Notes
New Windsor Road				
Nicodemus Road	MD-31 to MD-32			

== O ==
Road	Route	Places	Landmarks	Notes
Obrecht Road	MD-97 to 3rd Avenue (just short of MD-32)	Sykesville		
Old Liberty Road				
Old Manchester Road				
Old Taneytown Road				
Old Washington Road				
Old Westminster Pike	East Main Street (Westminster) @ MD-97 to MD-140.	Westminster, Finksburg		Unconnected gap in roadway, split by MD-140 @ Ridgemont Drive/Spencer Lane
Old New Windsor Road				

== R ==
Road	Route	Places	Landmarks	Notes
Ridge Road				
Rocky Ridge Road				

== S ==
Road	Route	Places	Landmarks	Notes
Sykesville Road				
Salem Bottom Road	MD-26 at Woodbine Road to Old Washington Road near Westminster City			

== T ==
Road	Route	Places	Landmarks	Notes
Taneytown Pike				
(Old) Taneytown Road				
Trevanion Road				

== W ==
Road	Route	Places	Landmarks	Notes
Washington Road				
Westminster Manchester Road				
Westminster Pike				
Woodbine Road	continuation of MD-94 at Howard County line to MD-26 at Salem Bottom Road			MD-94 officially ends at Lisbon rotary (intersection with Old Frederick Road) in Howard County and does not enter Carroll County.
