= Maryland Route 482 =

State highway in Maryland, United States

Maryland Route 482
- Hampstead Mexico Road
- Maryland Route 482 highlighted in red

Route information
- Maintained by MDSHA
- Length: 5.45 mi (8.77 km)
- Existed: 1933–present

Major junctions
- West end: MD 27 in Mexico
- MD 30 in Hampstead
- East end: MD 30 Bus. in Hampstead

Location
- Country: United States
- State: Maryland
- Counties: Carroll

Highway system
- Maryland highway system; Interstate; US; State; Scenic Byways
← MD 481	→ MD 485

Maryland Route 482 (MD 482) is a state highway in the U.S. state of Maryland. Known as Hampstead Mexico Road, the state highway runs 5.45 miles (8.77 km) from MD 27 in Mexico east to MD 30 Business in Hampstead in Carroll County. In conjunction with MD 27, MD 482 connects Westminster with Hampstead. The state highway was constructed at both ends in the early 1930s; the middle section was completed in the late 1940s. MD 482 was relocated in Mexico around 1960 and in Hampstead in 2009, the latter to connect with the new alignment of MD 30.

== Route description ==
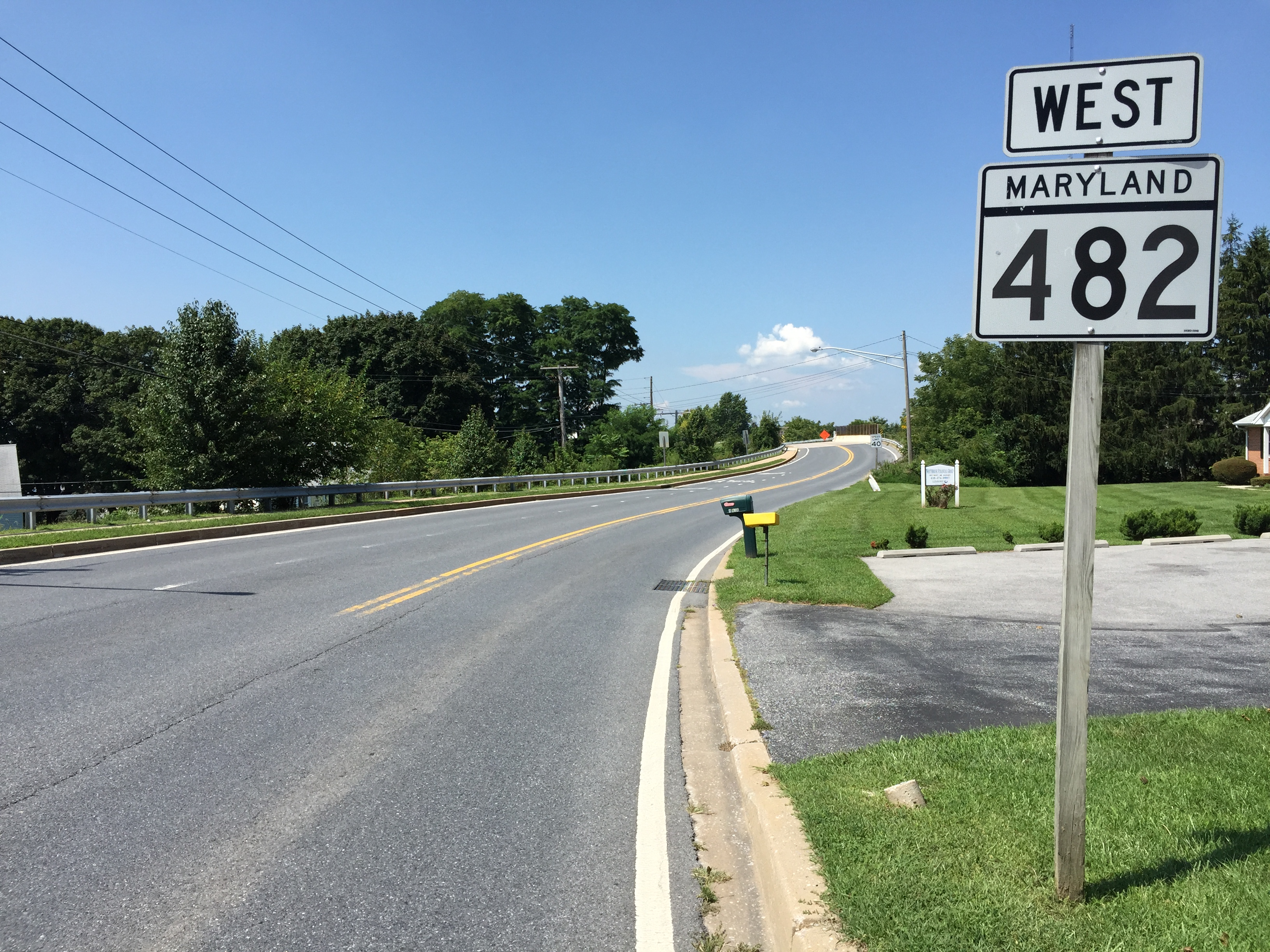
View west along MD 482 in Hampstead

MD 482 begins at an intersection with MD 27 (Manchester Road) in Mexico. The roadway continues west as Guadelupe Drive into the residential community of New Mexico. In Mexico, MD 482 intersects Old Manchester Road, which is unsigned MD 852G, and Leisters Church Road, which heads west as unsigned MD 849. The state highway heads east as a two-lane undivided road through farmland that traverses Aspen Run and the East Branch of the North Branch of the Patapsco River. Just after entering the town of Hampstead, MD 482 passes northwest of a park and ride lot and meets MD 30 (Hampstead Bypass) at a roundabout. The state highway passes north of the former North Carroll High School and crosses over CSX's Hanover Subdivision railroad line before reaching its eastern terminus at MD 30 Business (Main Street). The roadway continues east as municipally-maintained Fairmount Road.

MD 482 is a part of the National Highway System as a principal arterial from MD 27 to MD 849 in Mexico.

== History ==
The first improved highway east from Mexico was MD 87, which was constructed in 1925 along Leisters Church Road from Old Manchester Road—which was then MD 31 and now MD 852G—in Mexico southeast approximately 2 miles (3.2 km). MD 482 proper was constructed from MD 87 east to near Brodbeck Road and from MD 30 in Hampstead west to east of the East Branch of the North Branch of the Patapsco River by 1933. The eastern section of the state highway was extended west over the East Branch in 1936. The two sections of MD 482 were united when the middle section was improved in 1947. After MD 87 was removed from the state highway system in 1956, MD 482 was extended west to MD 31 along Leisters Church Road. The state highway was relocated to its present alignment west of Leisters Church Road in 1960 concurrent with the relocation of MD 31 between Westminster and Manchester; the old alignment became MD 849. MD 482 was relocated when its roundabout at the MD 30 Hampstead Bypass was constructed in 2009 concurrent with the completion of the bypass.

== Junction list ==
The entire route is in Carroll County.

Location	mi	km	Destinations	Notes
Mexico	0.00	0.00	MD 27 (Manchester Road) / Guadelupe Drive west – Westminster, Manchester, New Mexico	Western terminus
Mexico	0.11	0.18	Old Manchester Road	Unsigned MD 852G
Mexico	0.55	0.89	Leisters Church Road	Westbound Leisters Church Road is unsigned MD 849
Hampstead	4.77	7.68	MD 30 (Hampstead Bypass) – Manchester, Reisterstown	Roundabout
Hampstead	5.45	8.77	MD 30 Bus. (Main Street) / Fairmount Road east – Greenmount, Upperco	Eastern terminus
1.000 mi = 1.609 km; 1.000 km = 0.621 mi

== Auxiliary route ==
MD 482A is the designation for Lare Street, a 0.04-mile (0.064 km) section of old alignment of MD 482 between the main route and First Street in Hampstead.

== See also ==
- List of roads in Carroll County, Maryland
