= Mexico, Maryland =

Mexico, Maryland may refer to:

- Mexico, Allegany County, Maryland
- Mexico, Carroll County, Maryland
- New Mexico, Maryland
- Oakwood, Maryland, formerly Mexico, Maryland in Cecil County
