= Maryland Route 852 =

State highway in Maryland, United States

Maryland Route 852

Route information
- Maintained by MDSHA and City of Westminster
- Existed: 1960–present

Location
- Country: United States
- State: Maryland
- Counties: Carroll

Highway system
- Maryland highway system; Interstate; US; State; Scenic Byways
← MD 851	→ MD 853

Maryland Route 852 (MD 852) is a collection of state highways in the U.S. state of Maryland. These 11 highways are service roads related to and sections of an old alignment of MD 31 between New Windsor and Manchester in Carroll County. Between Westminster and Manchester, the sections of MD 852 follow MD 27, which replaced MD 31 north of Westminster in 1967. MD 852 has three distinct sections of mainline highway: MD 852 runs from New Windsor to south of Westminster, MD 852K runs from south of Westminster into the county seat, and MD 852G runs from north of Westminster to Mexico. What are now parts of MD 852 were originally constructed as MD 31 around 1920 south of Westminster and in the early 1910s north of Westminster. The sections of MD 852 were assigned north of Westminster in the late 1950s and south of Westminster in the mid-1960s.

== Route description ==
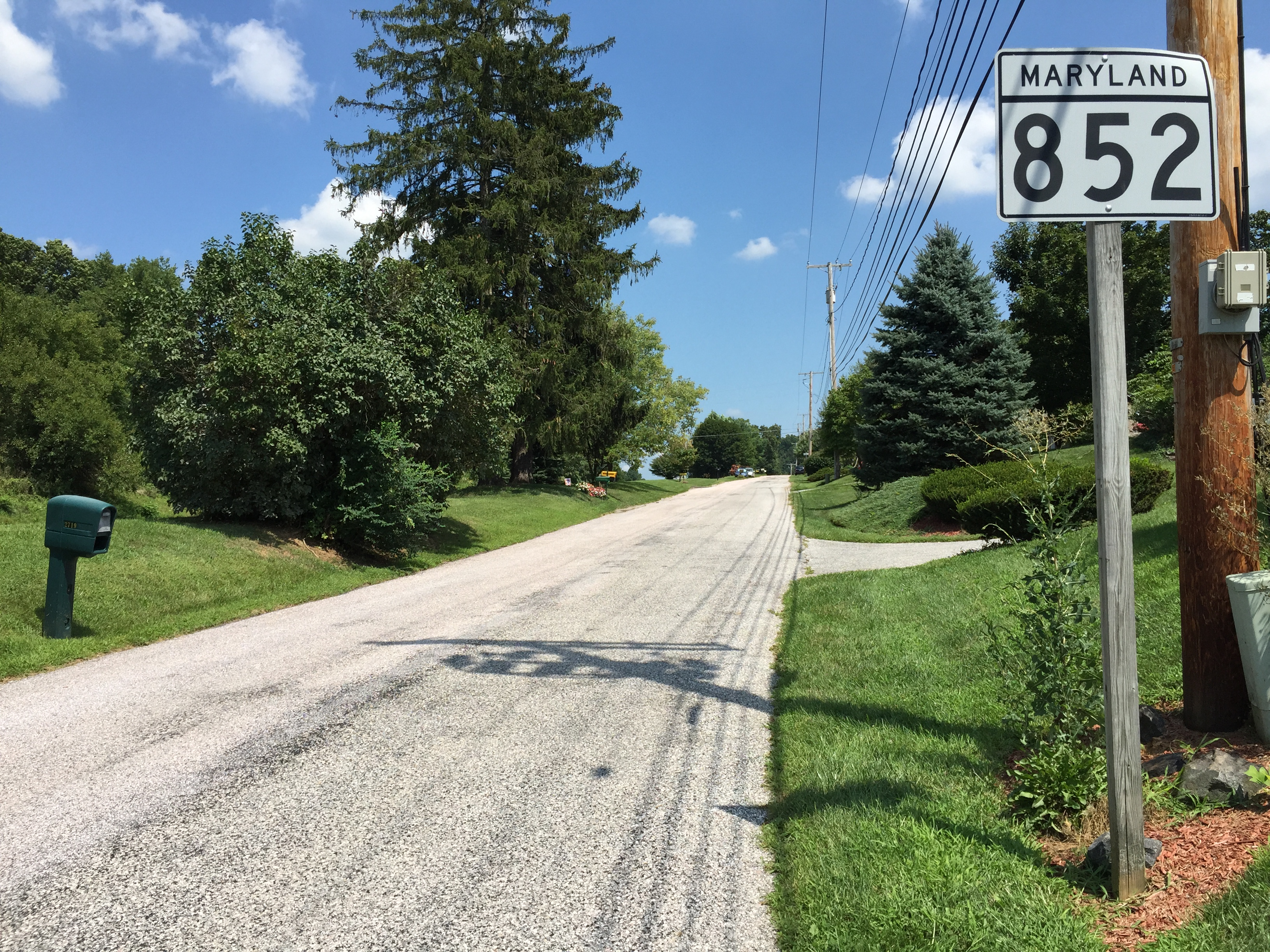
View north along MD 852C south of Manchester

There are three mainline sections of MD 852:

- MD 852 runs 3.72 miles (5.99 km) from MD 31 in New Windsor east to MD 31 near Westminster.
- MD 852K runs 2.19 miles (3.52 km) from MD 31 near Westminster to Main Street in Westminster.
- MD 852G runs 2.70 miles (4.35 km) from MD 27 in Westminster to MD 27 in Mexico.

=== New Windsor–Westminster ===
Maryland Route 852
- Location: New Windsor–Westminster
- Length: 3.72 mi (5.99 km)

MD 852 begins at an intersection with MD 31 (New Windsor Road) just east of the town of New Windsor. The state highway heads north as a two-lane undivided road perpendicular to MD 31, then curves east and starts to follow old alignment at its intersection with MD 852M (Old New Windsor Road), which heads southwest to a dead end adjacent to MD 31. MD 852 follows a curvy path through farmland in the Wakefield Valley. After crossing Little Pipe Creek just west of its intersection with Adams Mill Road, the state highway veers to the southeast to parallel the creek. MD 852 runs along the southwestern edge of Wakefield Valley Golf Course before reaching its eastern terminus at MD 31 southwest of Westminster.

=== Westminster ===
Maryland Route 852K
- Location: Westminster
- Length: 2.19 mi (3.52 km)

MD 852K begins at an intersection with MD 31 (New Windsor Road) a short distance east of MD 852's eastern terminus southwest of Westminster. The state highway heads south as two-lane undivided Stone Chapel Road to a three-way intersection where Stone Chapel Road turns west as a county highway. MD 852K turns east onto New Windsor Road. MD 852K closely parallels the eastbound direction of MD 31, serving as a service road for properties on the south side of the two highways. There appears to be a connector between MD 31 and MD 852K at MD 31's intersection with Tahoma Farm Road; however, barriers prevent access between the two highways. Access between the two highways was cut off in 2008 when a traffic signal was added at the MD 31–Tahoma Farm Road intersection. MD 852K diverges from MD 31 just inside the city limit of Westminster. MD 852K becomes municipally-maintained just south of where houses start to line the westbound side of the highway. The state highway climbs to the top of the ridge on which downtown Westminster sits and reaches its eastern terminus at the intersection of Main Street and Uniontown Road on the edge of the Western Maryland College Historic District and the district's namesake, McDaniel College.

=== Westminster–Mexico ===
Maryland Route 852G
- Location: Westminster–Mexico
- Length: 2.70 mi (4.35 km)

MD 852G begins at an intersection with MD 27 (Manchester Road) just north of the latter highway's crossing of the Maryland Midland Railway. MD 852G heads southeast as a two-lane undivided road to the intersection of MD 852H (Cranberry Road North) and Lucabaugh Mill Road, where the state highway picks up MD 31's old alignment and crosses Cranberry Branch. MD 852G curves to the northeast and passes through a mix of farmland and scattered residences. In the village of Mexico, the state highway intersects MD 482 (Hampstead Mexico Road) and that highway's old alignment, MD 849 (Leisters Church Road). North of Mexico, MD 852G veers north and reaches its northern terminus at MD 27 (Manchester Road).

== History ==
MD 31 from New Windsor to Westminster was originally constructed as a 15-foot (4.6 m) wide concrete road between 1919 and 1921. The state highway was widened to 21 feet (6.4 m) with a pair of 3-foot (0.91 m) wide macadam shoulders between 1936 and 1939. MD 852 was assigned to its present course after MD 31's present alignment was constructed between 1963 and 1965. MD 852K was assigned to its present course after MD 31's present alignment from southwest of Westminster to MD 140 was completed in 1967. By 1978, the state highway was municipally-maintained on its present stretch, which was named Doyle Avenue.

MD 27 from Westminster to Manchester was originally part of MD 31; Manchester Road became a northern extension of MD 27 in 1967. The Westminster–Manchester road was one of the original state roads marked for improvement by the Maryland State Roads Commission in 1909. The highway was completed from the Westminster city limit north to Cranberry Station on the Western Maryland Railway (now Maryland Midland Railway) in 1911. The road was extended to just south of Mexico in 1913; in addition, construction on the state road began from the Manchester end. The gap between Mexico and south of Manchester was filled in 1914. Construction began on reconstructing and widening MD 31 from Manchester to Westminster in 1957. This project involved several relocations of the highway by the time it was completed in 1960; sections of old road became segments of MD 852, including MD 852G between Westminster and Mexico.

== Junction lists ==
The entire route of all sections of MD 852 is in Carroll County.

=== MD 852 ===
Location	mi	km	Destinations	Notes
New Windsor	0.00	0.00	MD 31 (New Windsor Road)	Western terminus
New Windsor	0.07	0.11	Old New Windsor Road west	Unsigned MD 852M
Westminster	3.72	5.99	MD 31 (New Windsor Road)	Eastern terminus
1.000 mi = 1.609 km; 1.000 km = 0.621 mi

=== MD 852K ===
The entire route is in Westminster.

mi	km	Destinations	Notes
0.00	0.00	MD 31 (New Windsor Road) – New Windsor	Western terminus
0.02	0.032	Stone Chapel Road south	MD 852K turns east onto New Windsor Road
2.19	3.52	Main Street / Uniontown Road west	Eastern terminus
1.000 mi = 1.609 km; 1.000 km = 0.621 mi

=== MD 852G ===
Location	mi	km	Destinations	Notes
Westminster	0.00	0.00	MD 27 (Manchester Road) – Manchester	Southern terminus
Westminster	0.22	0.35	Cranberry Road North south / Lucabaugh Mill Road north	Cranberry Road North is MD 852H
Mexico	2.21	3.56	MD 482 (Hampstead Mexico Road) – Hampstead	
Mexico	2.31	3.72	Leisters Church Road east	Unsigned MD 849
Mexico	2.70	4.35	MD 27 (Manchester Road) – Westminster, Manchester	Northern terminus
1.000 mi = 1.609 km; 1.000 km = 0.621 mi

== Auxiliary routes ==
There are eight existing sections of MD 852 that are shorter than 1 mile (1.6 km). MD 852M is located in New Windsor. MD 852H and 852I are on the north side of Westminster. MD 852A, 852B, 852C, 852F, and 852J are between Mexico and Manchester.

- MD 852A is the designation for an unnamed 0.07-mile (0.11 km) spur of old alignment that parallels the southbound side of MD 27 between a county-maintained section of Old Manchester Road and Snydersburg Road, just south of MD 852B.
- MD 852B is the designation for an unnamed 0.07-mile (0.11 km) section of old alignment between two dead ends just north of MD 852A. MD 852B is connected to MD 27 by MD 27B.
- MD 852C is the designation for Manchester Road, a 0.58-mile (0.93 km) section of old alignment from MD 27 north to a dead end adjacent to MD 27's intersection with Westminster Street just south of Manchester. Westminster Street is the old alignment of MD 31 north to MD 30 in the center of Manchester. MD 852C is the only signed section of MD 852. The state highway runs parallel to the northbound direction of MD 27 and is connected to that highway by a trio of unnamed connector roads: MD 27C, MD 27D, and MD 27E.
- MD 852F is the designation for an unnamed 0.20-mile (0.32 km) section of old alignment between two dead ends just north of the northern terminus of MD 852G. MD 852F is connected to MD 27 by MD 27A (Random Ridge Road).
- MD 852H is the designation for a 0.24-mile (0.39 km) section of MD 31's old alignment from a dead end on the east side of MD 27's crossing of the Maryland Midland Railway to MD 852G's (Old Manchester Road) intersection with Lucabaugh Mill Road. MD 852H is unnamed from the dead end to county-maintained Cranberry Road North, then takes the latter name as it crosses the railroad track to its junction with MD 852G.
- MD 852I is the designation for a 0.09-mile (0.14 km) section of the unnamed spur of old alignment from Hahn Road east to a dead end on the west side of MD 27's crossing of the railroad.
- MD 852J is the designation for Martin Drive, a 0.46-mile (0.74 km) service road that extends from MD 27 south of its intersection with MD 482 north along the southbound side of MD 27 to a dead end.
- MD 852M is the designation for Old New Windsor Road, a section of old alignment of MD 31 in New Windsor. The state highway runs 0.20 miles (0.32 km) from MD 852 west to a dead end adjacent to MD 31.

== See also ==
- List of roads in Carroll County, Maryland
