= Unionville, Frederick County, Maryland =

Unincorporated community in Maryland, United States

Unionville, Maryland
- Unincorporated community
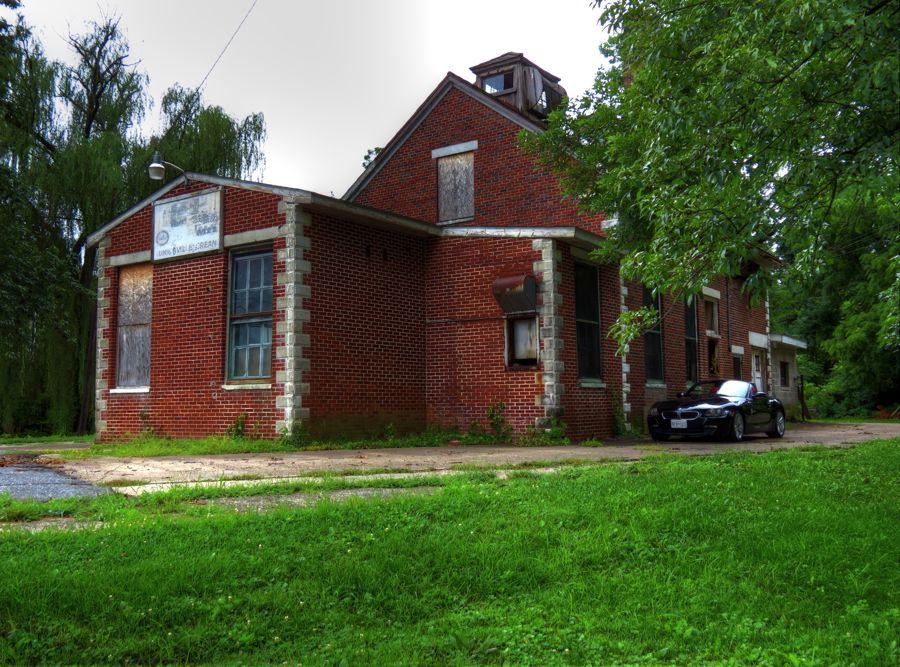

- Location in Maryland
- Coordinates: 39°28′29″N 77°11′08″W
- Country: United States
- State: Maryland
- County: Frederick
- Elevation: 440 ft (130 m)
- GNIS feature ID: 591457

Unionville is an unincorporated community in Frederick County, Maryland, United States. It is located approximately halfway between Frederick and Westminster, just east of Libertytown off Maryland Route 26 (Liberty Road). The Pearre-Metcalfe House, which sits on Albaugh Road, just outside the town's center, was listed on the National Register of Historic Places in 1979.

Unionville holds the world record for most rainfall recorded in one minute. On July 4, 1956, 1.23 inches of rain fell in one minute.
