= Maryland Route 808 =

State highway in Maryland, United States

Maryland Route 808
- Main Street

Route information
- Maintained by MDSHA
- Length: 2.34 mi (3.77 km)
- Existed: 1972–present
- Tourist routes: Old Main Streets Scenic Byway

Major junctions
- South end: Ridgeville Boulevard in Mount Airy
- North end: MD 27 near Mount Airy

Location
- Country: United States
- State: Maryland
- Counties: Carroll, Frederick

Highway system
- Maryland highway system; Interstate; US; State; Scenic Byways
← MD 807	→ MD 810

Maryland Route 808 (MD 808) is a state highway in the U.S. state of Maryland. Officially MD 808A and known as Main Street, the state highway runs 2.34 miles (3.77 km) from Ridgeville Boulevard north to MD 27 within Mount Airy. MD 808 follows the Carroll–Frederick county line for a portion of its length near its southern terminus. The county line portion is considered to be in Carroll County for maintenance purposes. MD 808 is the old alignment of MD 27 through Mount Airy. A portion of Main Street was paved by 1910; the sections south and north of the town center were constructed in the early 1910s and late 1910s, respectively. MD 808 was assigned to Main Street after MD 27's bypass of Mount Airy was completed in the mid-1970s.

== Route description ==
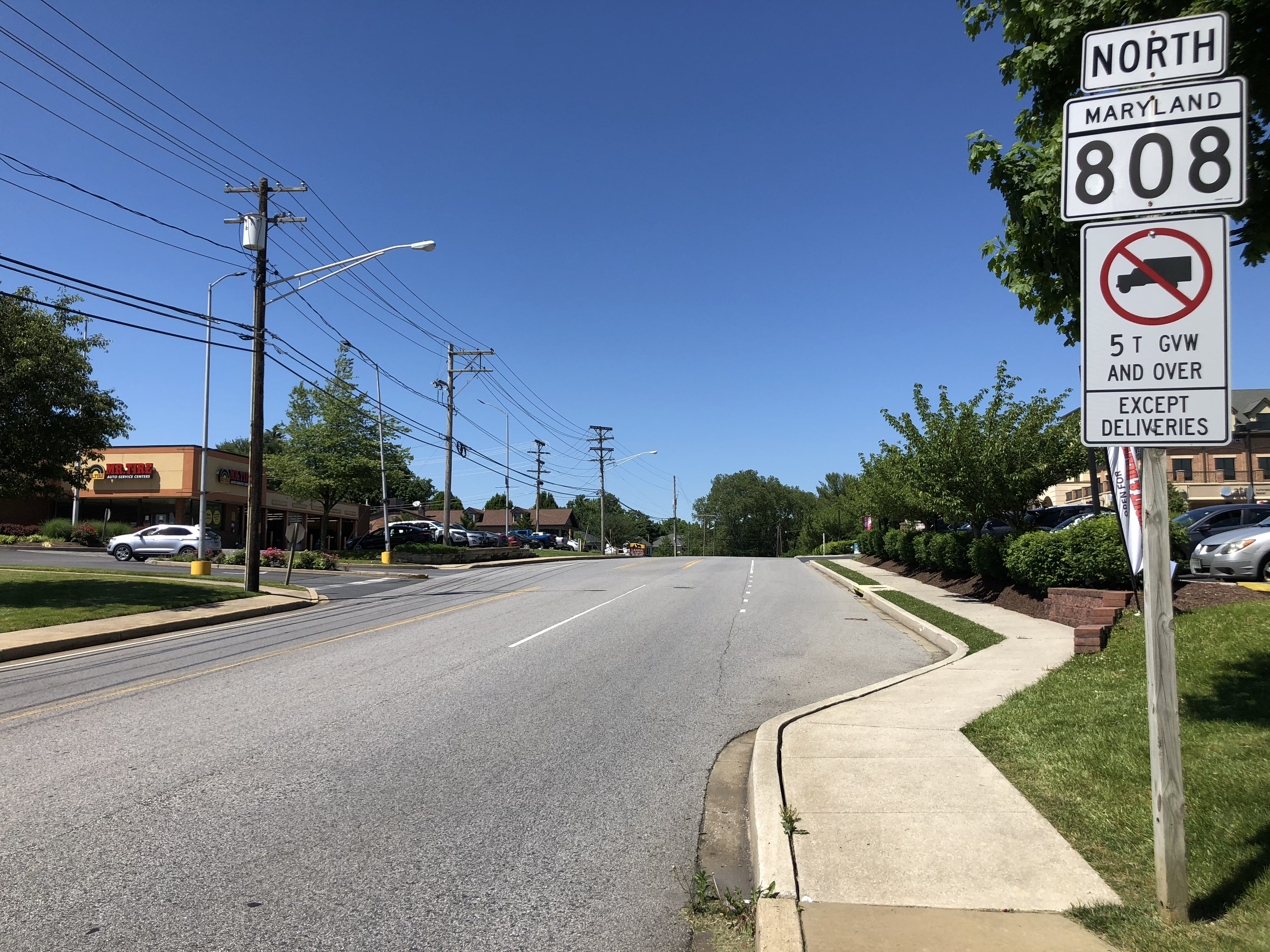
View north along MD 808 in Mount Airy

MD 808 begins at an intersection with Ridgeville Boulevard, the original route of U.S. Route 40 (US 40), in the Ridgeville section of Mount Airy. Main Street continues south as a municipal street to an intersection with MD 27 just north of that highway's interchange with Interstate 70 and US 40 (Baltimore National Pike). MD 808 heads north through residential subdivisions as a two-lane undivided road following the Carroll–Frederick county line on top of a ridge. South of Sunset Avenue, the state highway fully enters Carroll County. MD 808 continues north through the Mount Airy Historic District, where the highway crosses paths with the former right-of-way of the Mount Airy Loop of the Baltimore and Ohio Railroad. The state highway passes Buffalo Road, which forms the Carroll–Frederick county line for several miles, and Waterville Road before leaving the town limits. MD 808 passes through the hamlet of Dorceytown before reaching its northern terminus at an intersection with MD 27 (Ridge Road).

== History ==
The unincorporated community of Ridgeville and the town of Mount Airy developed on top of Parr's Ridge, a north–south ridge that separates the Monocacy River watershed and Frederick County to the west from the Patapsco River watershed and Carroll County to the east. The ridge was originally crossed by the Baltimore and Fredericktown Turnpike at Ridgeville and the B&O Railroad at Mount Airy. By 1910, a paved road connected the turnpike and the Mount Airy Loop of the railroad. The ridge-top road north 1.5 miles (2.4 km) from Mount Airy and south toward Montgomery County was designated for improvement as one of the original state roads by the Maryland State Roads Commission in 1909. The state road was paved as a 14-foot (4.3 m) wide macadam road from the turnpike in Ridgeville south to the Howard County line in 1913. The highway from the center of Mount Airy north through Dorceytown was completed as a 15-foot (4.6 m) wide concrete road in 1920.

MD 27 from its southern terminus in Germantown north to Westminster was originally designated MD 29 when the first state-numbered routes were established in Maryland in 1927. In 1934, US 29 was extended into Maryland over what had previously been MD 27 between Silver Spring and Ellicott City; the Germantown–Westminster and Silver Spring – Ellicott City highways swapped numbers. MD 27's interchange with I-70 was constructed when US 40 was relocated as a four-lane divided highway through Ridgeville in 1953 and 1954. MD 27's bypass of Mount Airy was constructed from Dorceytown south to Ridgeville Boulevard in 1972. The I-70 interchange was reconstructed as part of I-70's upgrade to Interstate standards in 1975. The bypass was completed from Ridgeville Boulevard south to the I-70 interchange in 1977; MD 808 was marked on Main Street by 1978.

== Junction list ==
The entire route of MD 808A is in Mount Airy. The state highway follows the Carroll–Frederick county line between its southern terminus and a point south of Sunset Avenue. The county line portion is considered to be in Carroll County for maintenance purposes. The remainder of the highway is in Carroll County.

mi	km	Destinations	Notes
0.00	0.00	Ridgeville Boulevard / Main Street south to MD 27 / I-70	Southern terminus; Ridgeville Boulevard was originally part of US 40
2.34	3.77	MD 27 (Ridge Road) – Westminster	Northern terminus
1.000 mi = 1.609 km; 1.000 km = 0.621 mi

== Auxiliary route ==
MD 808B is the unsigned designation for Spring Mills Road, a 0.23-mile (0.37 km) spur from MD 27 that preserves a section of old alignment of MD 27 south of Westminster.

== See also ==
- List of roads in Carroll County, Maryland
