= New Mexico, Maryland =

Unincorporated community in Maryland, United States

- Unincorporated community
- Location within the state of Maryland New Mexico (the United States)
- Coordinates: 39°36′12″N 76°56′56″W
- Country: United States
- State: Maryland
- County: Carroll
- Time zone: UTC-5 (Eastern (EST))
  - Summer (DST): UTC-4 (EDT)

New Mexico is an unincorporated community, in Carroll County, Maryland, United States. It lies at an elevation of 879 feet (268 m). The hamlet is not named after the state of New Mexico, but rather after the community of Mexico directly across MD-27 from New Mexico.
