= Maryland Route 26 =

State highway in Maryland, US

Maryland Route 26
- Maryland Route 26 highlighted in red

Route information
- Maintained by MDSHA and Baltimore DOT
- Length: 44.10 mi (70.97 km)
- Existed: 1927–present
- Tourist routes: Old Main Streets Scenic Byway

Major junctions
- West end: US 15 in Frederick
- MD 194 in Ceresville; MD 550 in Libertytown; MD 75 in Libertytown; MD 31 in Libertytown; MD 27 in Taylorsville; MD 97 near Eldersburg; MD 32 in Eldersburg; I-695 in Lochearn
- East end: MD 140 in Baltimore

Location
- Country: United States
- State: Maryland
- Counties: Frederick, Carroll, Baltimore, City of Baltimore

Highway system
- Maryland highway system; Interstate; US; State; Scenic Byways
← MD 25	→ MD 27

Maryland Route 26 (MD 26) is a state highway in the U.S. state of Maryland. Known for most of its length as Liberty Road, the state highway runs 44.10 miles (70.97 km) from U.S. Route 15 (US 15) in Frederick east to MD 140 in Baltimore. MD 26 connects Frederick and Baltimore with the highway's namesake of Libertytown in eastern Frederick County, the suburban area of Eldersburg in southern Carroll County, and the western Baltimore County suburbs of Randallstown, Milford Mill, and Lochearn. The highway also serves as a major thoroughfare in the western part of Baltimore, where the street is named Liberty Heights Avenue. MD 26 is maintained by the Maryland State Highway Administration outside of Baltimore and by the Baltimore City Department of Transportation within the city.

MD 26 follows much of the course of three turnpikes established in the 19th century. The Maryland State Roads Commission marked the portion of the highway from Baltimore to Eldersburg for improvement as one of the original state roads in 1909 and reconstructed the old turnpike in the early to mid-1910s. The Frederick– Libertytown segment of Liberty Road was reconstructed in the early 1920s. The remainder of MD 26 between Libertytown and Eldersburg was built in the mid-to-late 1920s and early 1930s. MD 26 was one of the original state-numbered highways designated in 1927; however, the Frederick– Libertytown portion was marked as MD 31 until 1933. Improvements to the highway at the Baltimore end began in the late 1910s and continued periodically through the 1950s. MD 26 was reconstructed from Frederick to Eldersburg throughout the 1950s, with major work concluding in the early 1960s. Many bypassed portions of the old road became parts of MD 850. MD 26 was extended west to modern US 15 in the late 1950s as a divided highway. That divided highway was extended east to MD 194 in Ceresville in the late 1990s.

== Route description ==
MD 26 is a part of the National Highway System as a principal arterial in three separate sections: from US 15 in Frederick east to Israel Creek east of Ceresville; from Emerald Lane west of Eldersburg to Liberty Reservoir east of Eldersburg; and Lyons Mill Road in Randallstown east to MD 140 in Baltimore.

=== Frederick to Eldersburg ===
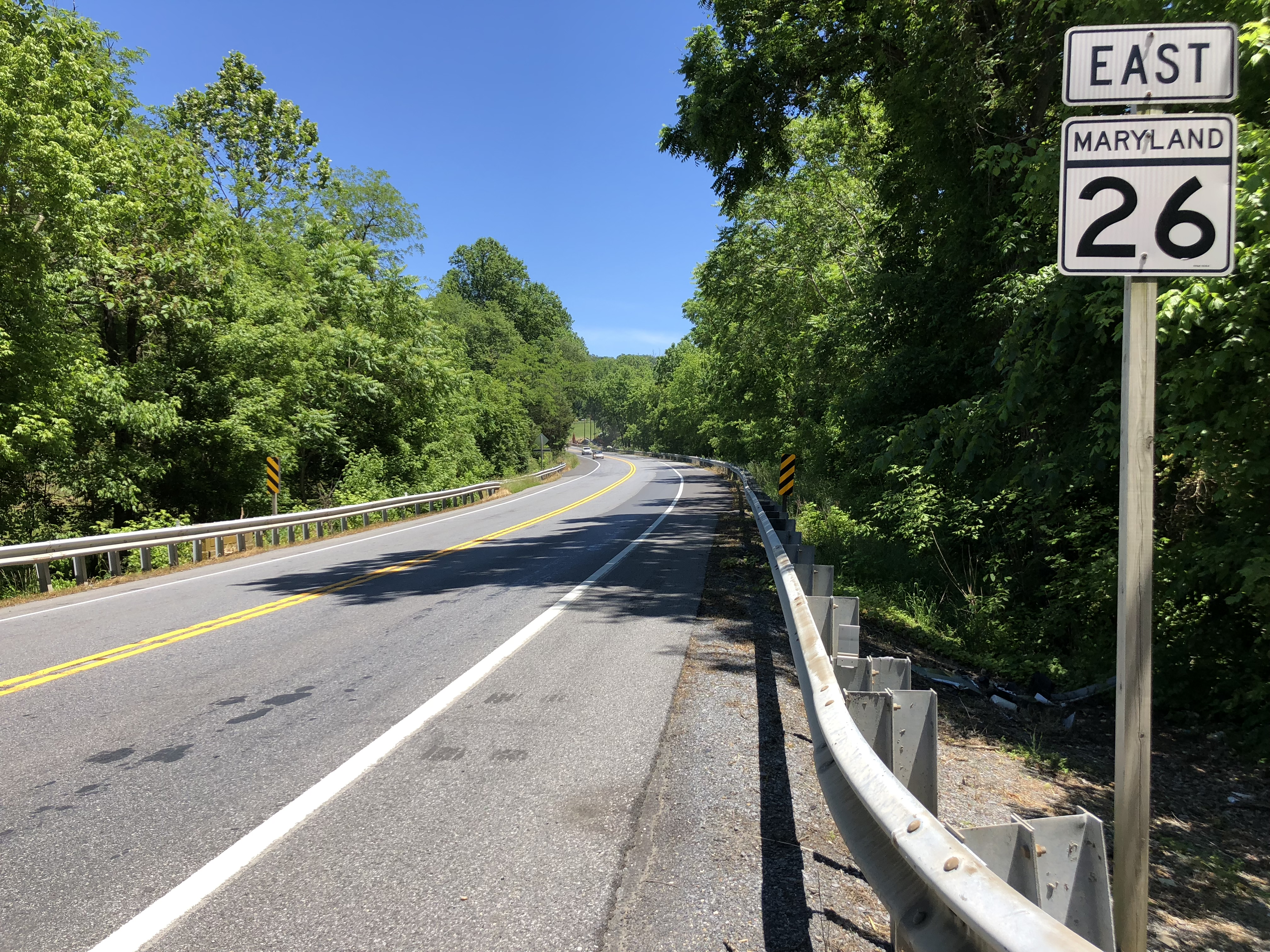
MD 26 eastbound in Mount Pleasant

MD 26 begins at a partial trumpet interchange with US 15 (Catoctin Mountain Highway) on the north side of the city of Frederick. There is no access from southbound US 15 to eastbound MD 26. MD 26 heads east as a four-lane divided highway through a mixed commercial and industrial area. The state highway has an intersection with Wormans Mill Road and Routzhan Way and a directional intersection with the northern end of Market Street that allows access to and from MD 26 east. The first intersection, which was formerly MD 355, provides the missing movements from the Market Street intersection. MD 26 intersects Monocacy Boulevard, a partial circumferential highway of Frederick, and passes between a pair of residential subdivisions before crossing the Monocacy River on a pair of dissimilar bridges, the westbound one a through truss bridge. East of the river, the state highway meets the southern end of MD 194 (Woodsboro Pike) at the hamlet of Ceresville. The divided highway continues north as MD 194 toward Woodsboro and MD 26 turns east onto a two-lane undivided road.

MD 26 continues east through farmland where it crosses Israel Creek and passes through the village of Mount Pleasant. The state highway forms the main street of Libertytown, where the highway meets the southern end of MD 550 (Woodsboro Road), intersects MD 75 (Church Street), and intersects the western end of MD 31 (New Windsor Road) at the east end of the village. MD 26 crosses Dollyhyde Creek and several branches of the North Fork of Linganore Creek while passing to the north of Unionville and to the south of the historic Pearre-Metcalfe House. The state highway enters Carroll County at its intersection with Buffalo Road where the highway is paralleled by the first of many segments of Old Liberty Road, MD 850, to the south. MD 26 is paralleled by the second section of MD 850 as the highway enters the hamlet of Taylorsville, where it intersects MD 27 (Ridge Road). Two more segments of MD 850 parallel MD 26 through Winfield, which is the home of South Carroll High School.

=== Eldersburg to Baltimore ===
At the west end of the expansive suburban area of Eldersburg, MD 26 is paralleled to the south by the easternmost section of MD 850 and the mainline highway has an interchange with MD 97 (New Washington Road) that consists of a two-way ramp between the two highways in the southwest quadrant of the junction and an exit ramp from westbound MD 26 to MD 97. MD 26 is paralleled by several county-maintained sections of Old Liberty Road as it approaches the center of Eldersburg. West of Wesley Chapel Methodist Episcopal Church, MD 26 expands to a five-lane road with a center left-turn lane. East of the highway's intersection with MD 32 (Sykesville Road), the highway parallels a few more stretches of Old Liberty Road and passes to the north of the community of Carrolltowne, which contains the historic Moses Brown House. At the east end of Eldersburg, MD 26 reduces to two lanes and crosses a branch of Liberty Reservoir, which is an impoundment of the North Branch of the Patapsco River. The state highway passes through the hamlet of Shervettes Corner, which contains the final segment of Old Liberty Road and Branton Manor, before crossing the mainstem of Liberty Reservoir into Baltimore County.

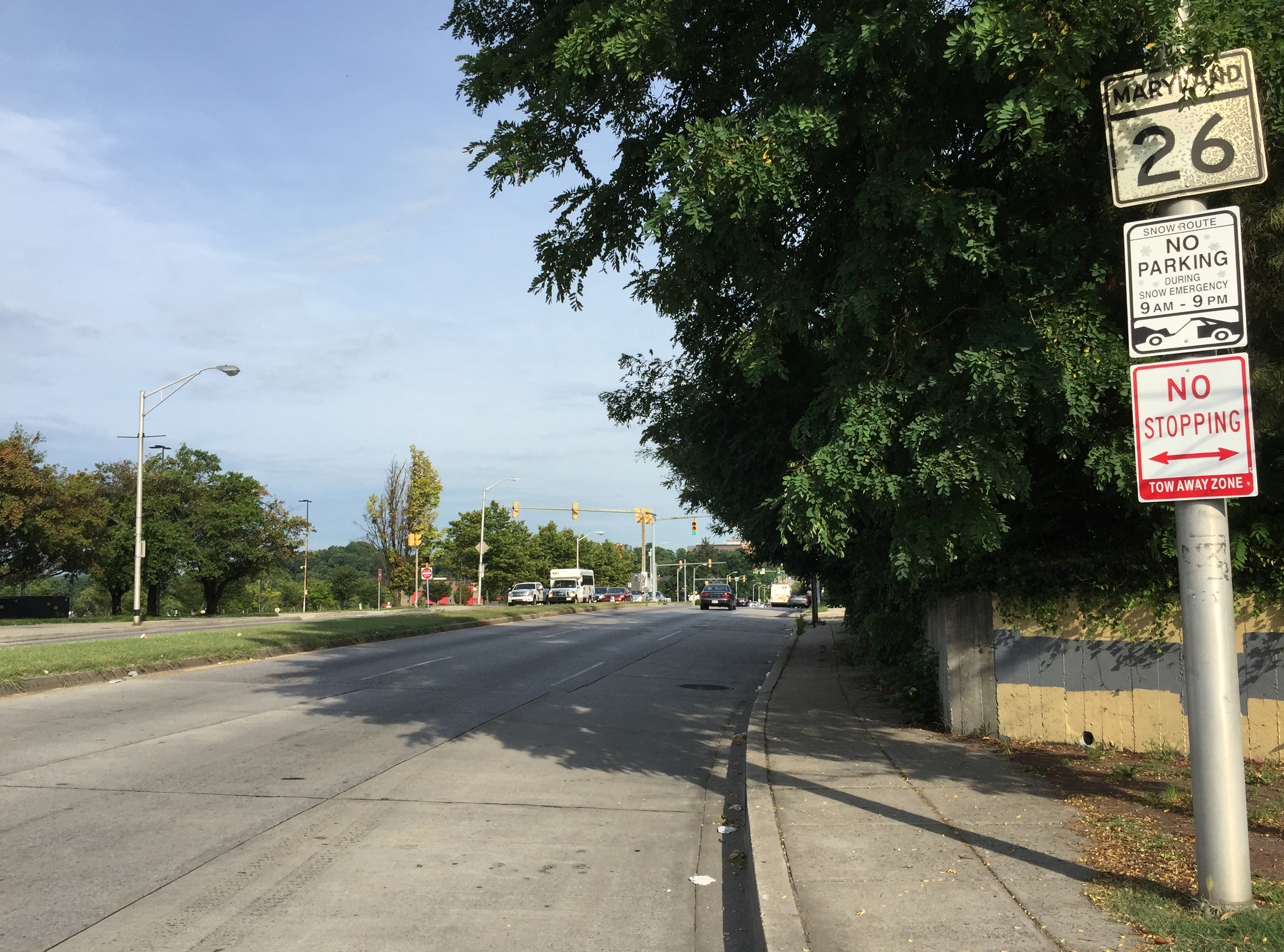
View west near the east end of MD 26 at MD 140 in Baltimore

MD 26 passes through the hamlet of Harrisonville and expands to a five-lane road with a center turn lane at Deer Park Road at the west end of Randallstown, where the highway passes the Choate House next to Wildwood Park. The state highway intersects Old Court Road before entering the suburb of Milford Mill, where the highway meets Rolling Road. MD 26 expands to a divided highway shortly before its partial cloverleaf interchange with Interstate 695 (Baltimore Beltway). The state highway has a center turn lane within Lochearn, where the highway crosses Gwynns Falls and enters the city of Baltimore. Here, the highway's name changes to Liberty Heights Avenue. MD 26 meets the western end of Northern Parkway and passes through Powder Mill Park just east of the city line. The highway passes Howard Park P.S. 218 in the Howard Park neighborhood and south of Forest Park High School in the Forest Park area of the city, where the highway expands to a six-lane divided boulevard and continues through Ashburton, the site of Hanlon Park and Lake Ashburton. MD 26 crosses over CSX's Hanover Subdivision railroad line just west of Druid Park Drive and Baltimore City Community College. The highway passes between Liberty Square and the Mondawmin neighborhood— the latter the site of Mondawmin Mall, the Mondawmin station of MTA Maryland's Baltimore Metro SubwayLink, and Coppin State University— before reaching its eastern terminus at MD 140 (Reisterstown Road). Liberty Heights Avenue continues east as an unnumbered street to MD 129 (Auchentoroly Terrace) at Druid Hill Park. There is no left turn from eastbound MD 26 to northbound MD 140; that movement is made via Liberty Heights Avenue and MD 129 or by Druid Park Drive.

== History ==
=== Turnpikes and state roads ===
Much of Liberty Road in Baltimore and Frederick counties originated as a trio of turnpikes. The Frederick and Woodsboro Turnpike ran from its split with the Frederick and Emmitsburg Turnpike north of Frederick east to Ceresville. In Ceresville, the highway split into the Woodsboro and Frederick Turnpike, which headed toward Woodsboro, and the Liberty and Frederick Turnpike, which terminated in Libertytown. The Baltimore and Liberty Turnpike ran from the city of Baltimore west to the Patapsco River. This turnpike was surveyed and reconstructed in 1861, at which time the turnpike's original bridge over Gwynns Falls was repaired. That bridge lasted until 1868 when it was destroyed by a flood and replaced by the turnpike company with a higher timber bridge.

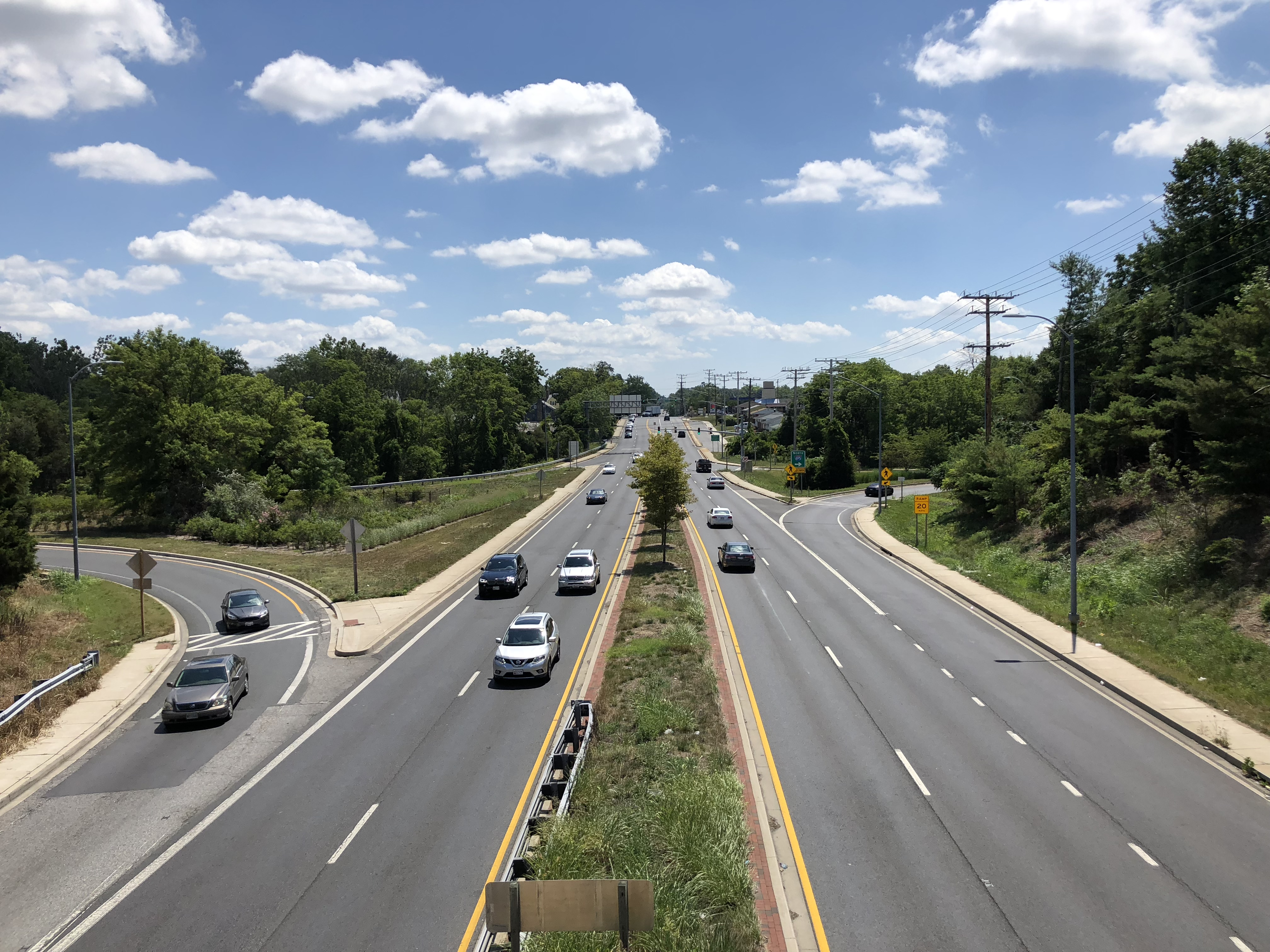
MD 26 eastbound viewed from I-695 in Lochearn

In 1909, Liberty Road was marked for improvement between Baltimore and Eldersburg as one of the original state roads by the Maryland State Roads Commission. The first section of the highway improved was in Baltimore County from the existing city limit of Baltimore near what is now Grenada Avenue west to what is now Rogers Avenue; that section was constructed as a 16-to-18-foot (4.9 to 5.5 m) wide tarred macadam road in 1911. The portion of Liberty Heights Avenue from the city line east to Callaway Avenue was reconstructed in 1915 as a 50-foot (15 m) wide street with vitrified brick and sheet asphalt surface. The section between Callaway Avenue and Reisterstown Road was underway by 1914 and completed shortly after 1916; this section included a bridge over the Western Maryland Railway with a roadway width of 40 feet (12 m).

Construction on Liberty Road outside of Baltimore continued in 1914, when a new concrete arch span was constructed over Gwynns Falls as part of the 14-foot (4.3 m) wide macadam section from Rogers Avenue west to Old Court Road completed in 1915. Another 14-foot (4.3 m) wide macadam road was built from Eldersburg to the Patapsco River, with a new reinforced concrete bridge over the river, in 1915. The state road from Baltimore to Eldersburg was completed shortly after 1916 with the addition of a 3-mile (4.8 km) concrete road from the Patapsco River to the west end of Randallstown and macadam resurfacing of the old turnpike through Randallstown to Old Court Road.

At the west end of Liberty Road, the highway from Frederick to Libertytown was paved in macadam by 1921. This highway was originally marked as MD 31 when the Maryland State Roads Commission first numbered state highways in 1927. The portion of MD 31 west of Libertytown became an extension of MD 26 by 1933. The gap between Eldersburg and Libertytown was gradually constructed as a concrete road. The highway was constructed from Eldersburg to Dorsey Crossroads, the site of the modern MD 97 junction, by 1923. MD 26 was extended through Winfield in 1924 and 1925. The concrete road was extended to just east of Taylorsville in 1928, the same year a new section of the highway was paved through Unionville. The road to Taylorsville was completed and the Unionville concrete road was extended east in 1930. The final sections of MD 26 between Baltimore and Frederick were completed in 1933, the same year a steel through truss bridge was constructed over the Monocacy River to replace the vulnerable old bridge at Ceresville.

=== 20th century improvements ===
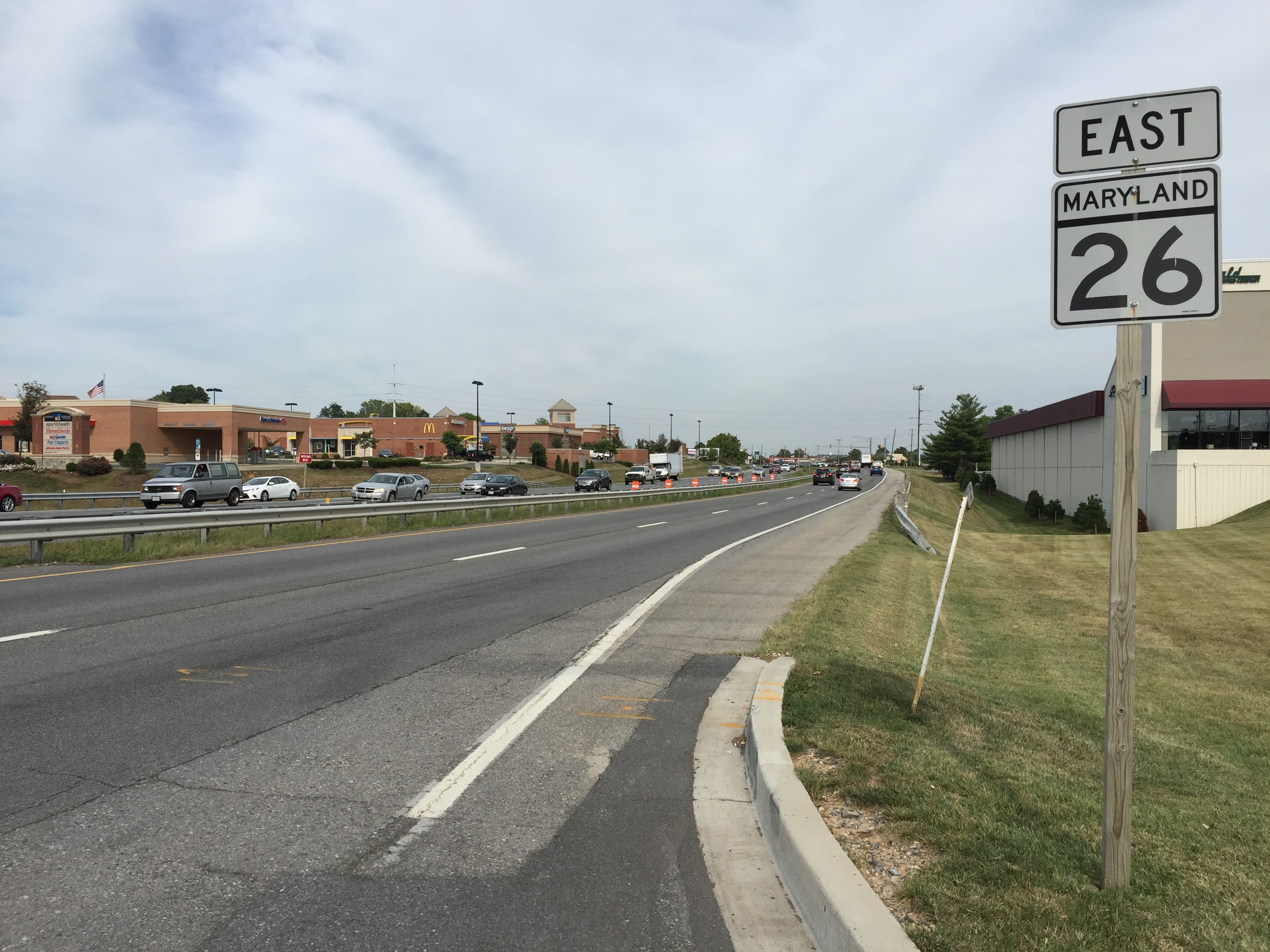
MD 26 eastbound in Frederick

Widening of MD 26 began shortly after the first sections were built. Liberty Heights Avenue was widened with 3-foot (0.91 m) concrete shoulders starting in 1918. Concrete shoulders were added to Liberty Road through Baltimore County and west to Eldersburg by 1926; the highway's macadam surface was also widened from US 15 to Ceresville in that time span. MD 26 from Baltimore to Randallstown had been widened again, to 20 feet (6.1 m), by 1930, and was recommended to be widened again to 30 feet (9.1 m) in 1934. The highway was widened to 22 feet (6.7 m) in width in 1945. MD 26 received a new steel beam bridge with a 26-foot (7.9 m) wide roadway over the Patapsco River at North Branch in 1938. That bridge was replaced in 1954 when Liberty Reservoir was filled; the highway was also widened and resurfaced from Randallstown to the bridge in 1952.

Modernization of MD 26 in Frederick County began in 1949 with a pair of projects on either side of Libertytown. The highway was rebuilt with relocations through Mount Pleasant in 1950 and a bypass of Unionville, replacing what is now Unionville Road, was completed in 1951. MD 26 was widened and resurfaced through Libertytown starting in 1954. Reconstruction work continued into Carroll County when the highway was rebuilt from Liberty Reservoir west to Eldersburg starting in 1954 and from the eastern end of the Unionville relocation to Taylorsville beginning in 1956. In 1957, work began on relocating, widening, and resurfacing MD 26 through Eldersburg and between Taylorsville and Winfield. The final section of MD 26 in Carroll County to be placed in its modern form was from Winfield to Eldersburg, which was completed in 1962 with grade separation and interchange ramps at the MD 97 junction. Sections of the old Liberty Road became segments of MD 850 as they were bypassed.

MD 26 was extended west as a divided highway from Market Street in Frederick to modern US 15 when that highway was completed in 1959. MD 26 was reconstructed as a divided highway from Market Street (then part of MD 355) in Frederick to Ceresville between 1997 and 1999. This work involved the construction of a parallel bridge across the Monocacy River to complement the old truss bridge. Also, the MD 26– MD 194 intersections were reconfigured so the primary movement through the intersection is between MD 26 to the west and MD 194 to the north; the southernmost portion of MD 194 became an extension of the MD 26 divided highway. This configuration was chosen because two-thirds of traffic passing through the intersection was between Frederick and Woodsboro.

== Junction list ==
County	Location	mi	km	Destinations	Notes
Frederick	Frederick	0.00	0.00	US 15 (Catoctin Mountain Highway) – Frederick, Thurmont	Western terminus; US 15 Exit 17; no access from southbound US 15 to eastbound MD 26
Frederick	Ceresville	2.20	3.54	MD 194 north (Woodsboro Pike) – Woodsboro	Southern terminus of MD 194
Frederick	Libertytown	9.35	15.05	MD 550 north (Woodsboro Road) – Woodsboro	Southern terminus of MD 550
Frederick	Libertytown	9.69	15.59	MD 75 (Church Street) – New Market, Union Bridge	
Frederick	Libertytown	10.11	16.27	MD 31 east (New Windsor Road) – New Windsor	Western terminus of MD 31
Carroll	Taylorsville	18.32	29.48	MD 27 (Ridge Road) – Mount Airy, Westminster	
Carroll	Eldersburg	23.04	37.08	MD 97 (New Washington Road) – Westminster, Olney	Interchange
Carroll	Eldersburg	26.62	42.84	MD 32 (Sykesville Road) – Sykesville, Westminster	
Baltimore	Randallstown	36.67	59.01	Old Court Road – Pikesville	
Baltimore	Milford Mill	37.45	60.27	Rolling Road – Woodlawn	
Baltimore	Lochearn	38.64	62.19	I-695 (Baltimore Beltway) – Towson, Glen Burnie	I-695 Exit 18
Baltimore City		40.76	65.60	Northern Parkway east	Western terminus of Northern Parkway
Baltimore City		44.10	70.97	MD 140 (Reisterstown Road) / Liberty Heights Avenue east	Eastern terminus
1.000 mi = 1.609 km; 1.000 km = 0.621 mi: Incomplete access

== Auxiliary routes ==
- MD 26A is the designation for the 0.02-mile (0.032 km) connector between MD 26 and MD 850I on the westbound side of MD 26 east of Winfield.
- MD 26C is the designation for a 0.02-mile (0.032 km) connector between MD 26 and MD 850J. The route was designated in 2013.
- MD 26D is the designation for a 0.02-mile (0.032 km) connector between MD 26 and MD 850J. The route was designated in 2013.
- MD 26E is the designation for a 0.02-mile (0.032 km) connector between MD 26 and MD 850E. The route was designated in 2013.
- MD 26F is the designation for a 0.02-mile (0.032 km) connector between MD 26 and MD 850E. The route was designated in 2013.
