= Parr's Ridge =

Ridge in Maryland, United States

Coordinates: 39°24′N 77°8′W

Parr's Ridge is a ridge which forms the summit of the Piedmont Plateau region in the U.S. state of Maryland.

The ridge, a gentle summit in contrast to Maryland's Appalachian ridges to the west, extends from southwest to northeast through Montgomery, Howard and Carroll counties. The highest point in Maryland east of the Appalachian Mountains, Dug Hill in northern Carroll County, at an elevation of just over 1100 feet (335 m), is a mile or two to the west of the ridge. The Patuxent and Patapsco rivers both have headwaters on the ridge. The South branch of the Patapsco's headwaters point is dubbed Parr's Spring, and is the meeting point of four of Maryland's counties: Howard, Carroll, Montgomery, and Frederick. The Spring is submerged beneath a pond on the grounds of the eponymous "Four-County Farm."

The area was surveyed by John Parr in 1744, patenting the land as "Parr's Range". David McMurtrie Gregg marched his troops through the area during the civil war on the way to Gettysburg.

Maryland State Route 27 ("Ridge Road") follows the course of Parr's Ridge.

Communities along Parr's Ridge include, from south to north, Damascus, Mount Airy (where Interstate 70 crosses the ridge), Westminster, Cranberry, Manchester, and Lineboro.

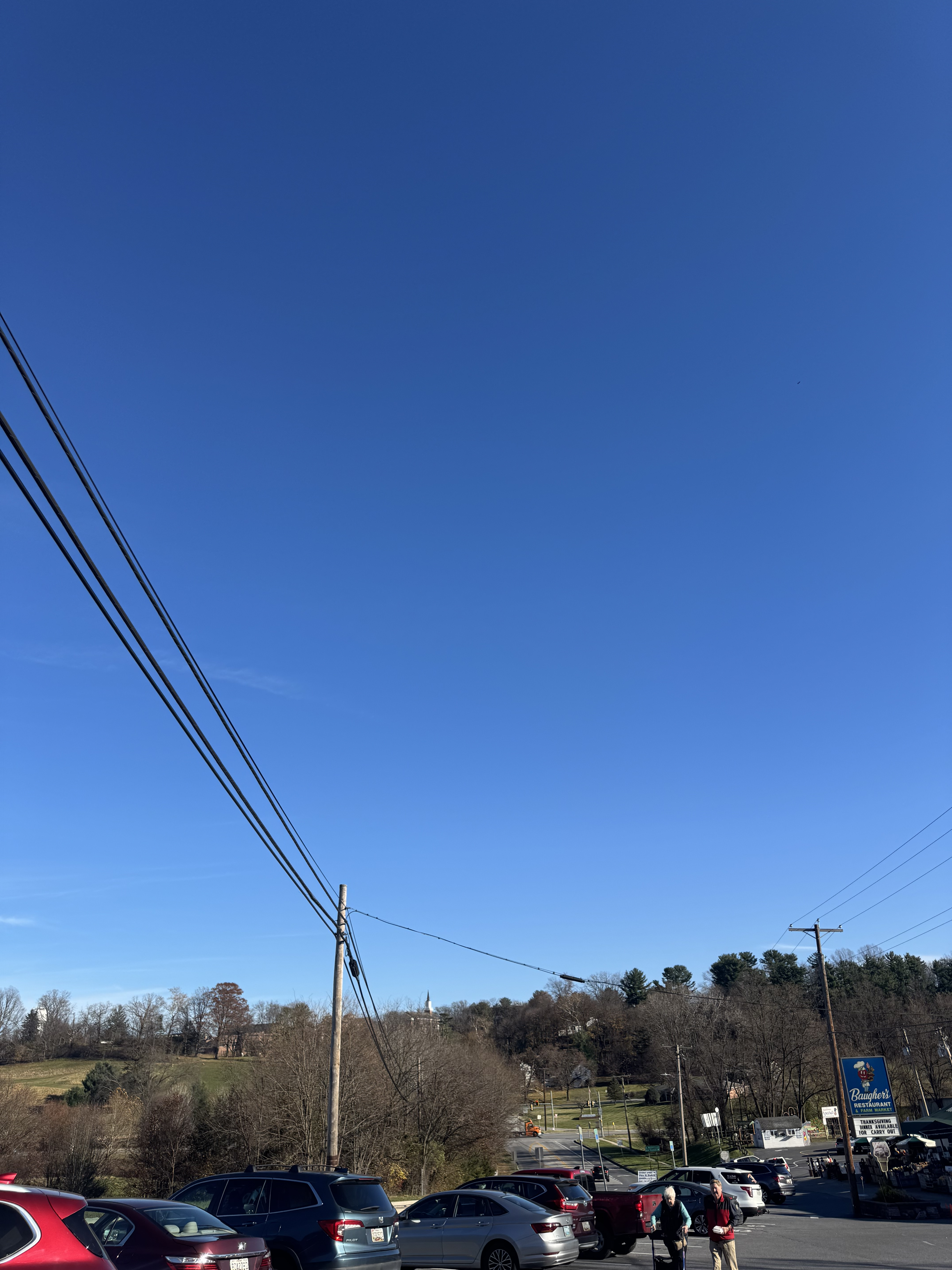
Parr’s Ridge in Westminster, MD
