= Taylorsville, Maryland =

Unincorporated community in Maryland, U.S.

Coordinates: 39°27′28″N 77°05′12″W

Taylorsville is an unincorporated place in Carroll County, Maryland, United States. Taylorsville is located where MD 26 and MD 27 intersect, approximately 17 miles east of Frederick and 27 miles northwest of Baltimore. Taylorsville is near Morgan Run Natural Environment Area.
