= Maryland Route 27 =

State highway in Maryland, United States

Maryland Route 27

Route information
- Maintained by MDSHA
- Length: 39.17 mi (63.04 km)
- Existed: 1934–present
- Tourist routes: Historic National Road; Old Main Streets Scenic Byway

Major junctions
- South end: MD 355 near Germantown
- MD 108 in Damascus; MD 80 near Damascus; I-70 / US 40 in Mount Airy; MD 808 near Mount Airy; MD 26 in Taylorsville; MD 407 near Taylorsville; MD 97 / MD 140 in Westminster; MD 482 in Mexico
- North end: MD 30 in Manchester

Location
- Country: United States
- State: Maryland
- Counties: Montgomery, Howard, Frederick, Carroll

Highway system
- Maryland highway system; Interstate; US; State; Scenic Byways
← MD 26	→ MD 28

Maryland Route 27 (MD 27) is a state highway in the U.S. state of Maryland. Known for most of its length as Ridge Road, the highway runs 39.17 miles (63.04 km) from MD 355 in Germantown north to MD 30 in Manchester. MD 27 follows a ridge that separates several watersheds in northern Montgomery County and Carroll County. The highway connects Germantown and Manchester with Damascus in far northern Montgomery County; Westminster, the county seat of Carroll County; and Mount Airy, which lies at the junction of Carroll, Frederick, Howard, and Montgomery counties and where MD 27 intersects Interstate 70 (I-70)/U.S. Route 40 (US 40).

MD 27 follows what was originally MD 29 and part of MD 31. The highway received its present number south of Westminster in a swap with US 29 in 1934 and north of Westminster in 1967. Ridge Road south of Mount Airy and Manchester Road between Westminster and Manchester was constructed as one of the original state roads in the early to mid-1910s. The Mount Airy– Westminster portion of MD 27 was built in the 1920s. MD 27 was reconstructed in the early to mid-1950s from Germantown to Westminster. MD 31 was reconstructed north of Westminster in the late 1950s; old segments of the highway became part of MD 852. MD 27 bypassed Mount Airy in the 1970s, leaving behind MD 808. The highway was relocated at its southern end in the mid-1990s to improve access between Damascus and Germantown and I-270.

== Route description ==
MD 27 runs on top of or in the vicinity of a long ridge known for most of its length as Parr's Ridge. This ridge separates several sets of watersheds in central Maryland, with the result that MD 27 bridges no significant streams. From Germantown to south of Damascus, the ridge separates the waters of Little Seneca Creek to the west and Great Seneca Creek to the east; these creeks come together at Dawsonville and flow into the Potomac River. From Damascus north, all streams west of the ridge flow into the Monocacy River, including Bennett Creek, Bush Creek, and Little and Big Pipe Creek from south to north. All east-side streams flow into the Patuxent River from Damascus to the south of Mount Airy, the South Branch of the Patapsco River from Mount Airy to Taylorsville, and the Patapsco River North Branch from Taylorsville to Manchester. MD 27 is part of the National Highway System as a principal arterial in five sections: from MD 355 in Germantown to Gue Road in Damascus; from Penn Shop Road south of Mount Airy to the Frederick– Carroll county line; from I-70 to the northern town limit of Mount Airy; from Chapel Road south of Westminster to Old Manchester Road in Mexico; and from the southern town limit of Manchester to MD 30.

=== Germantown to Mount Airy ===
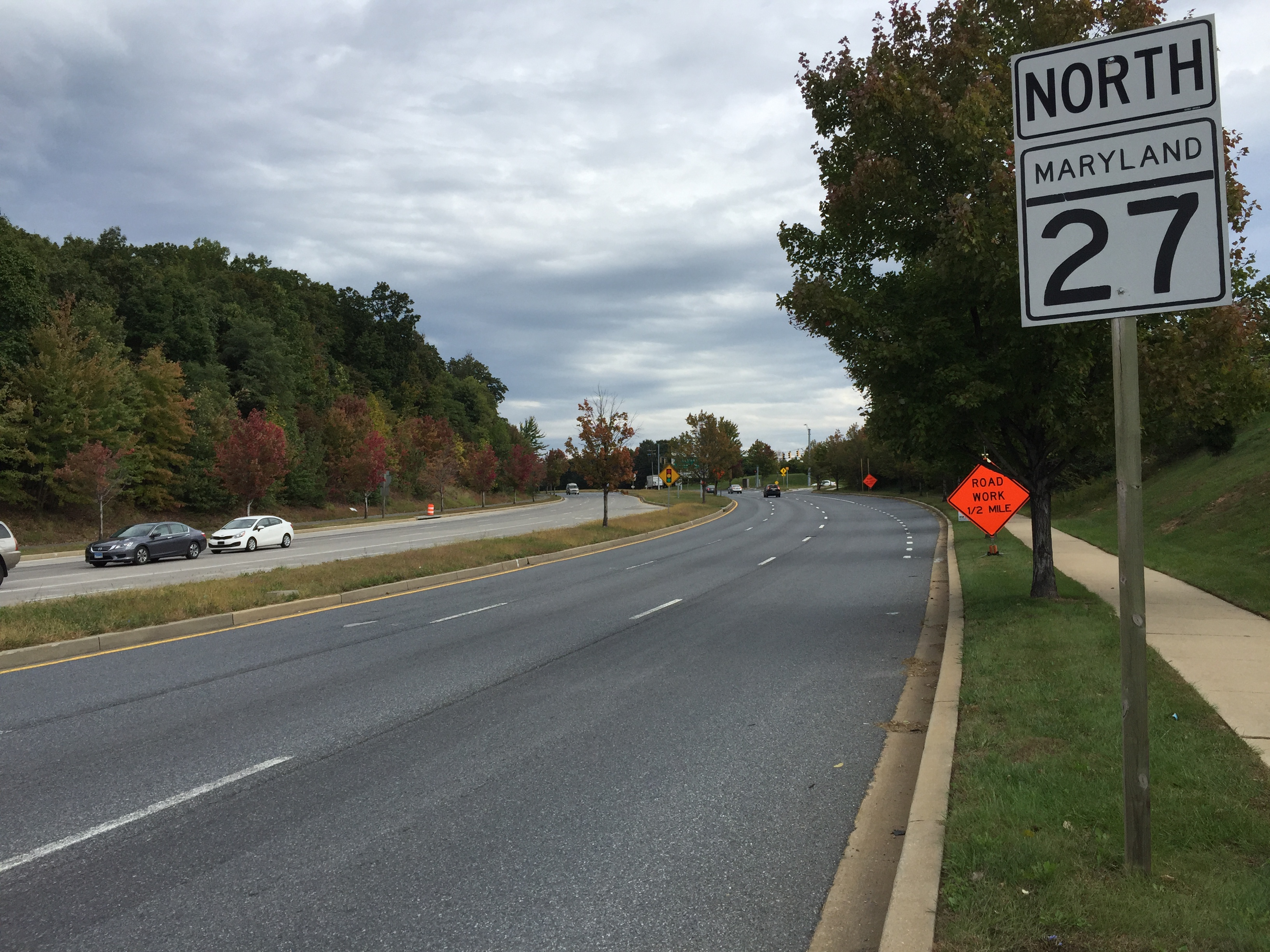
MD 27 northbound past southern terminus at MD 355 in Germantown

MD 27 begins as Ridge Road at an intersection with MD 355 (Frederick Road) on the northern edge of Germantown. Ridge Road continues west as a six-lane divided county highway to a partial cloverleaf interchange with I-270 (Eisenhower Memorial Highway), beyond which the county highway continues as Father Hurley Boulevard, one of the primary arteries of Germantown. MD 27 curves north through a directional intersection with Henderson Corner Road and reduces from a six-lane divided highway to a two-lane undivided road past its intersection with Brink Road. The highway passes through the hamlet of Cedar Grove on its way to Damascus. West of Damascus High School, MD 27 gains a center left-turn lane, a second lane northbound, then becomes a four-lane undivided highway. The highway becomes two lanes again at the west end of downtown Damascus, curves east then turn north to remain on Ridge Road. The road continues straight east as MD 108 (Main Street), which leads to MD 124 (Woodfield Road).

MD 27 starts of Damascus as a four-lane undivided highway but quickly drops to two lanes. At the north end of the unincorporated town, the state highway meets the northern end of county-maintained Woodfield Road. MD 27 meets the eastern end of MD 80 (Kemptown Road) in the hamlet of Claggettsville. The highway crosses the Patuxent River just south of its source and passes through the western edge of Howard County. Between a pair of intersections with Penn Shop Road, MD 27 crosses a sliver of Montgomery County before entering Frederick County and expanding to a four-lane divided highway. The highway meets the west end of the Mount Airy–Ellicott City segment of MD 144 (Old National Pike). The intersection is just west of Parrs Spring, the source of the South Branch of the Patapsco River. Parrs Spring contains the quadripoint where the boundaries of Montgomery, Howard, Frederick, and Carroll counties meet.

=== Mount Airy to Manchester ===
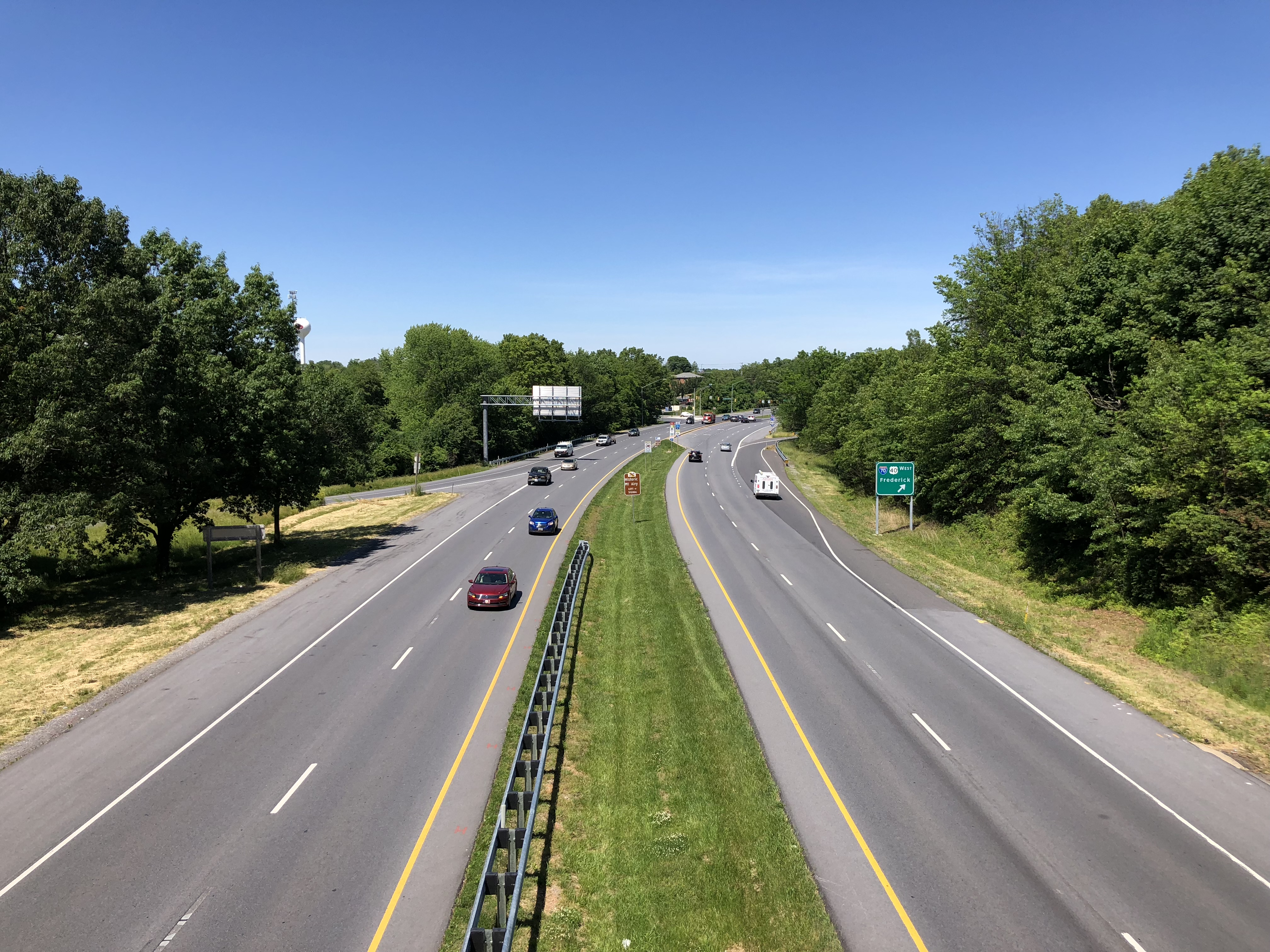
View north along MD 27 from I-70/US 40 in Mount Airy

North of MD 144, MD 27 briefly follows the Frederick– Carroll county line before fully entering Carroll County and the town of Mount Airy at its partial cloverleaf interchange with I-70/US 40 (Baltimore National Pike). The west leg of MD 27's intersection with the ramp from westbound I-70/US 40 meets the southern end of Main Street, which becomes MD 808 north of Ridgeville Boulevard. The MD 27– Main Street intersection is directly above the tunnel CSX's Old Main Line Subdivision railroad line uses to pass through Parrs Ridge. The state highway becomes undivided north of Ridgeville Boulevard; the highway passes a longitudinal park and ride facility before intersecting Park Avenue and Twin Arch Road, where the route drops to two lanes. MD 27 leaves and re-enters Mount Airy a few times before leaving for good south of its intersection with MD 808 (Main Street) in the hamlet of Dorceytown.

MD 27 continues north along the top of Parrs Ridge. The highway intersects MD 26 (Liberty Road) at Taylorsville and meets the eastern end of MD 407 (Marston Road) north of there. MD 27 crosses Morgan Run south of the hamlet of Warfieldsburg and crosses the Maryland Midland Railway and Little Pipe Creek at Spring Mills. The state highway enters a dense residential neighborhood just north of its junction with Bond Street but does not enter the city of Westminster and the Westminster Historic District until George Street. MD 27 follows Liberty Street for three blocks to Main Street; at that intersection, the state highway and Main Street intersect the Maryland Midland Railway and MD 27 becomes Railroad Avenue. The route parallels the railroad through an industrial area and has a center turn lane until its four-ramp partial cloverleaf interchange with MD 97 and MD 140 (Baltimore Boulevard).

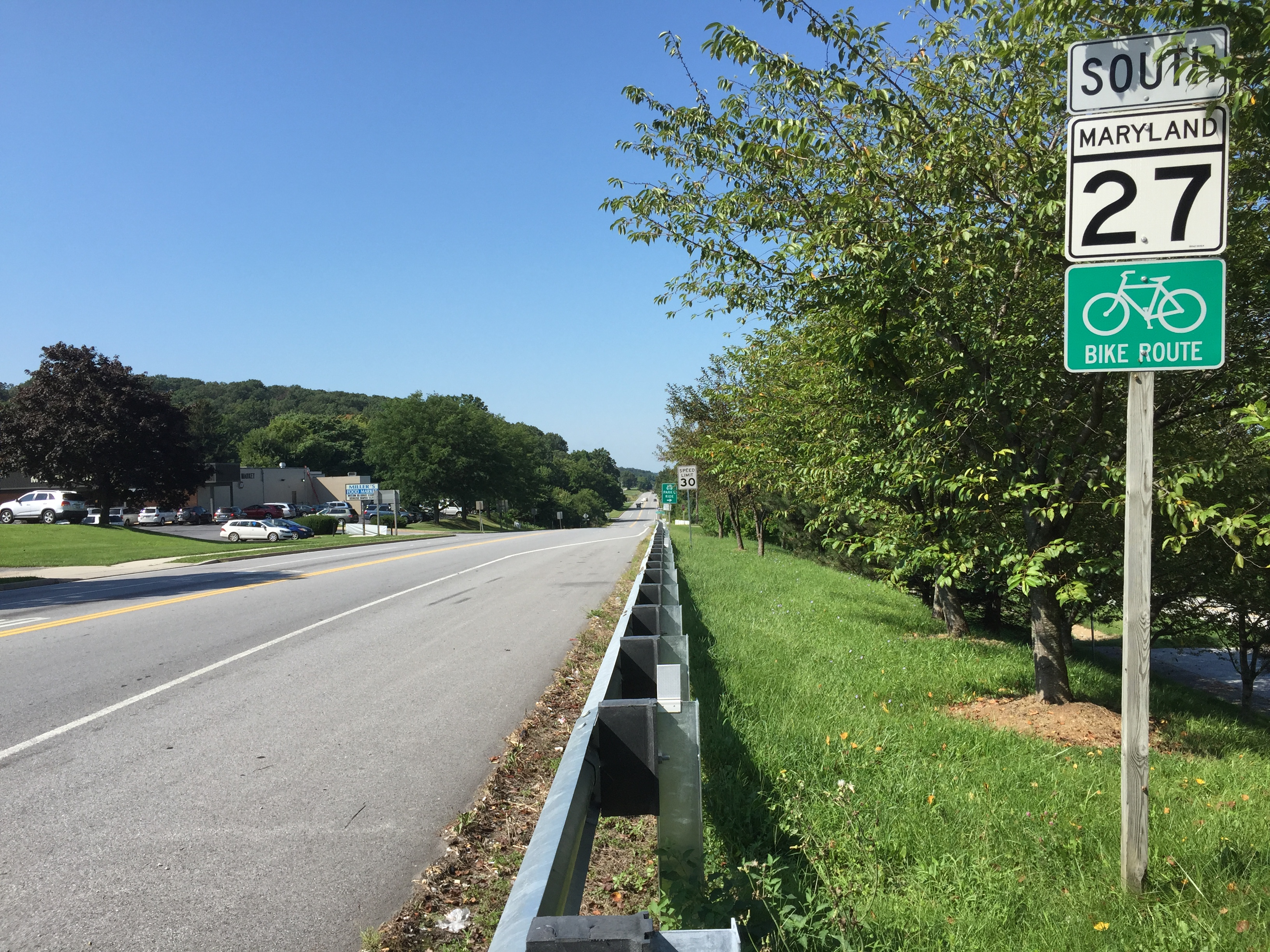
View south at the north end of MD 27 at MD 30 in Manchester

MD 27 heads northeast out of the city of Westminster and becomes Manchester Road. The highway crosses the Maryland Midland Railway and the West Branch of the North Branch of the Patapsco River ahead of its intersection with unsigned MD 852G (Old Manchester Road). MD 27 crosses Cranberry Branch before reaching Mexico, where the highway meets the western end of MD 482 (Hampstead Mexico Road) and the northern end of MD 852G (Old Manchester Road). The highway is paralleled by several segments of Old Manchester Road, most of the segments of MD 852. MD 27 intersects a non-state segment of the old road, Westminster Street, shortly before the route enters the town of Manchester and passes south of a park and ride lot before reaching its northern terminus at MD 30 (Hanover Pike), the town's main street.

== History ==
Maryland Route 29
- Location: Germantown–Westminster
- Existed: 1927–1934

Ridge Road was designated MD 29 and Manchester Road was marked as MD 31 when the Maryland State Roads Commission first assigned numbers to state roads in 1927. MD 29 became MD 27 in a number swap with the original MD 27, which ran from Silver Spring to Ellicott City when the latter highway became part of US 29 in 1934. MD 27 was extended north along Manchester Road in place of MD 31, which was truncated at Westminster, in 1967.

=== Original construction ===
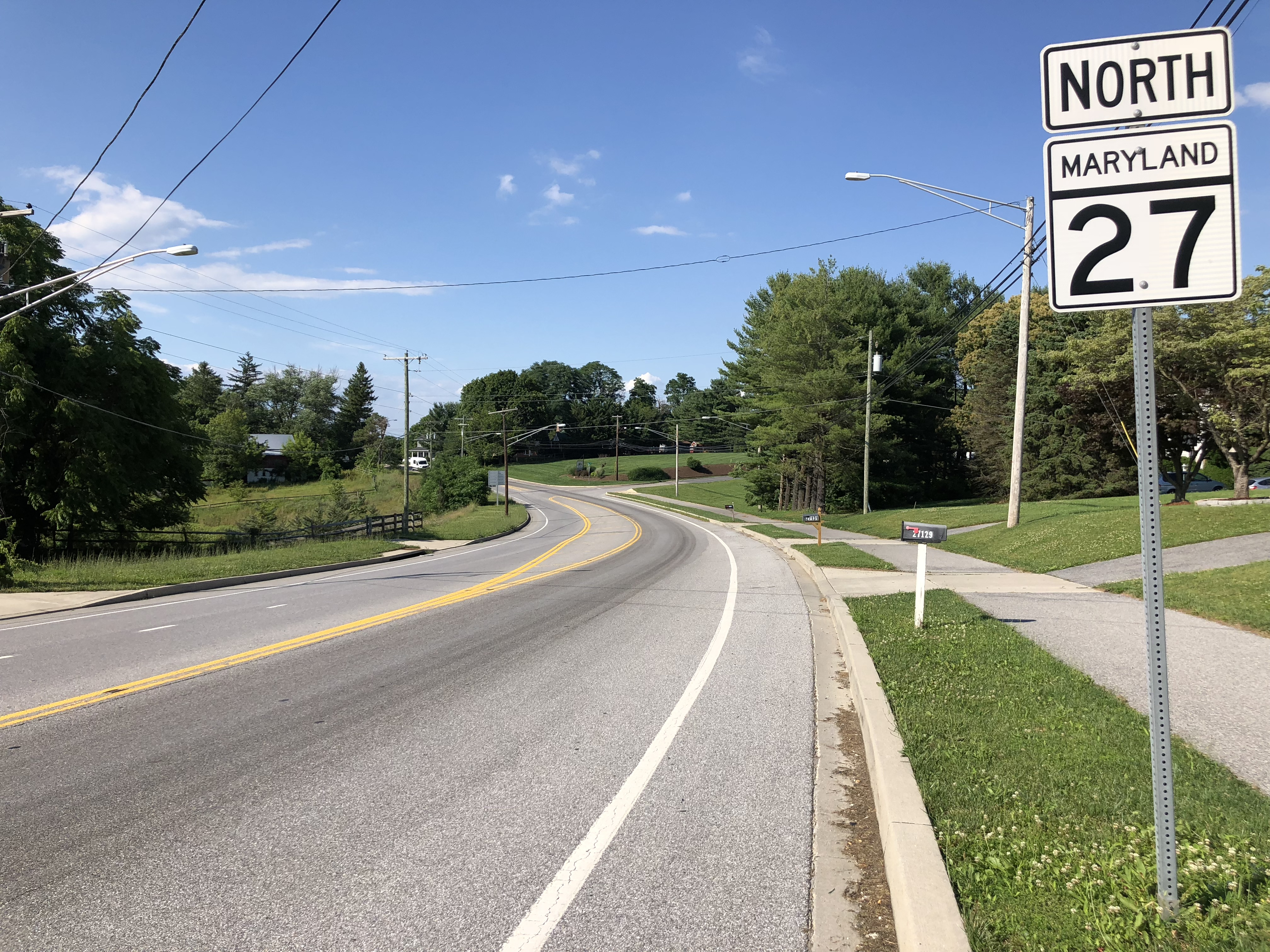
MD 27 northbound past Woodfield Road north of Damascus

Ridge Road from Germantown to Mount Airy and Manchester Road from Westminster to Manchester were included in the original state road system drawn up by the Maryland State Roads Commission in 1909. The segment of the highway from the National Pike (now Ridgeville Boulevard) at Ridgeville to the Baltimore and Ohio Railroad (now CSX's Old Main Line Subdivision) in the center of Mount Airy was paved by 1910. In 1911, Ridge Road was built as a 14-foot-wide (4.3 m) macadam road from the National Pike south to the Patuxent River. That same year, construction began from Henderson's Corner at Frederick Road north of Germantown to Davis Mill Road near Cedar Grove. That segment was completed as a 14-foot-wide (4.3 m) macadam road in 1912. That portion of Ridge Road was extended to near Kings Valley in 1914. The gap from south of Damascus to the Patuxent River was completed as a 14-foot-wide (4.3 m) concrete road from the Patuxent River to Claggettsville in 1913 and through Damascus in 1915. Manchester Road was completed as a 14-foot-wide (4.3 m) macadam road from the Westminster city limit north to Cranberry Station on the Western Maryland Railway (now Maryland Midland Railway) in 1911. The road was extended to just south of Mexico in 1913; in addition, construction on the state road began from the town limit of Manchester. The gap between Mexico and south of Manchester was filled in 1914. The northernmost part of the highway, a concrete road along Westminster Street in the town of Manchester, was completed by 1921.

Work on Ridge Road between Mount Airy and Westminster began with the construction of a concrete road from the existing macadam road in Mount Airy north to Dorceytown between 1918 and 1920. The concrete road was started from the Westminster end and reached a point north of Warfieldsburg by 1923. The modern highway was extended south through Warfieldsburg and north from Dorceytown to the north of Gillis Falls Road by 1927. The northern segment was extended south to Morgan Run and the southern segment north to Gillis Road in 1928. Ridge Road was completed from Mount Airy to Westminster when the gap through Taylorsville was filled in 1929. The Germantown–Mount Airy portion of Ridge Road once served as the primary highway between Frederick and Rockville, but was eclipsed by the 9-mile shorter (14 km) highway through Hyattstown and Urbana when that highway, designated US 240 (now MD 355), was completed in 1926.

=== Modernization and improvements ===
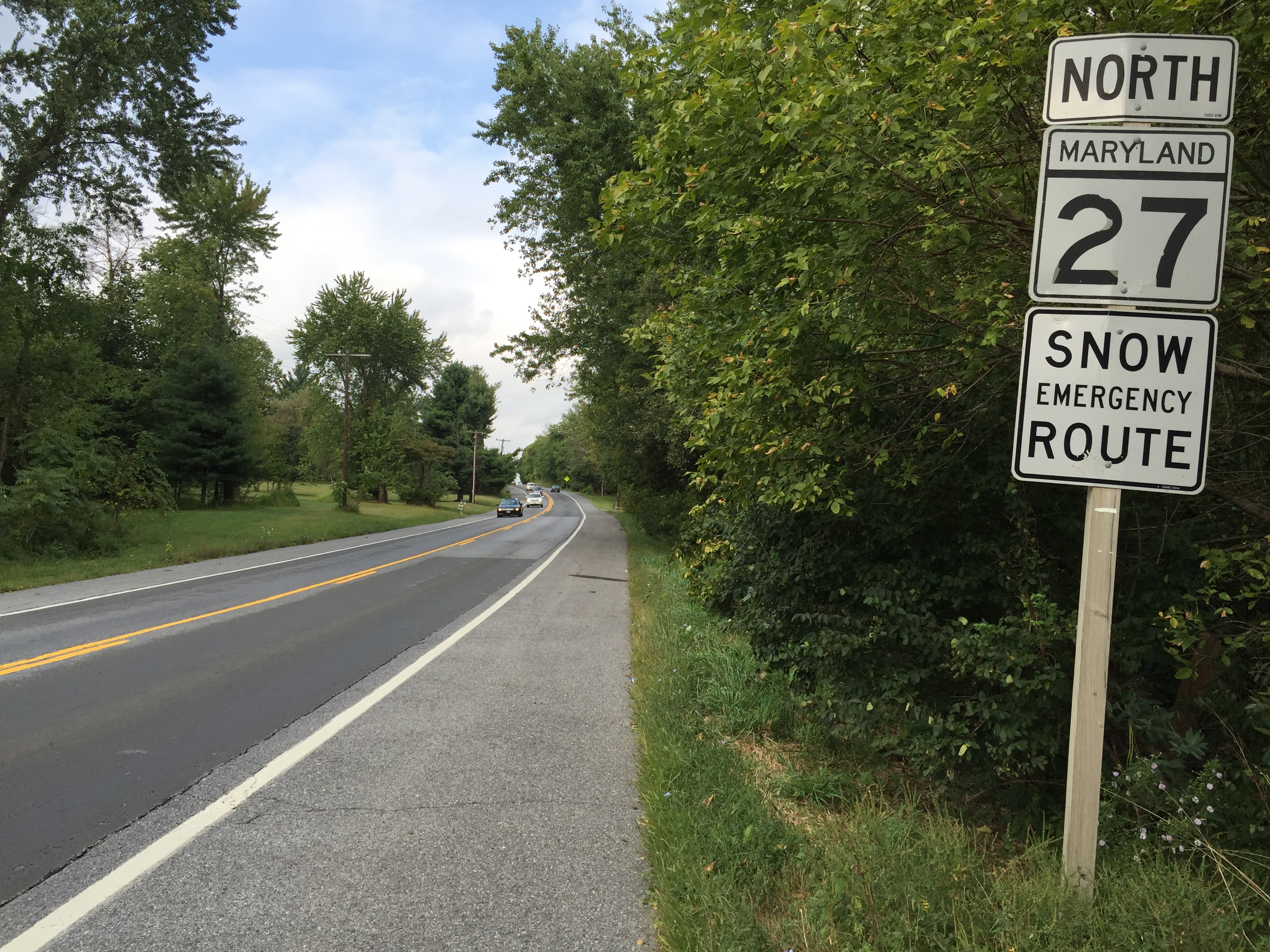
MD 27 northbound past the Patuxent River in Howard County

In 1934, the Maryland State Roads Commission recommended MD 27 from Henderson's Corner to Ridgeville and MD 31 from Westminster to Manchester be widened to 20 feet (6.1 m). MD 27 was widened with the addition of a pair of 2.5-foot-wide (0.76 m) and resurfaced from Damascus to Ridgeville and from Mount Airy to the north of Dorceytown in 1938. Extensive work on the highway from Germantown to Damascus started with the stretch from Damascus to the Patuxent River, which was widened from 19 to 22 feet (5.8 to 6.7 m) and resurfaced between 1948 and 1950. MD 27 was widened to 24 feet (7.3 m) and resurfaced from near Parrs Spring to the center of Mount Airy between 1950 and 1952. The highway between Cedar Grove and Damascus was widened and resurfaced in 1953 and 1954; this work included a major relocation that replaced a curvaceous segment on what is now Oak Drive. Modernization of MD 27 between Germantown and Mount Airy concluded when the portion between US 240 and Cedar Grove was widened and resurfaced between 1954 and 1956.

MD 27 and MD 31 were widened and resurfaced through Westminster starting in 1952. MD 27 was widened and resurfaced from Westminster to the south of Warfieldsburg between 1950 and 1954; this work included a relocation at Spring Mills. Work on the highway from south of Warfieldsburg to Taylorsville and there to Mount Airy; both widening and resurfacing projects got underway in 1954 and were completed in 1956. Construction began on reconstructing and widening MD 31 from Manchester to Westminster in 1957. This project involved several relocations of the highway, including moving Manchester Road to its present terminus at MD 30, by the time it was completed in 1960. Sections of the old road became segments of MD 852, including MD 852G between Westminster and Mexico.

MD 27's original interchange with I-70 was constructed when US 40 was relocated as a four-lane divided highway through Ridgeville in 1953 and 1954. This interchange was a four-ramp partial cloverleaf along the line of Mount Airy's Main Street directly on the Carroll– Frederick county line. MD 27's bypass of Mount Airy was constructed from Dorceytown south to Ridgeville Boulevard in 1972. MD 27's I-70 interchange was reconstructed to its present six-ramp partial cloverleaf design slightly to the east of the old interchange as part of I-70's upgrade to Interstate standards in 1975. MD 27's bypass of Mount Airy was completed from Ridgeville Boulevard south to the I-70 interchange in 1977; MD 808 was marked on Main Street by 1978. MD 27 was relocated at its southern end as a divided highway from MD 355 to Brink Road between 1993 and 1996. This work was part of a state– county project to connect Ridge Road and Father Hurley Boulevard with I-270 to improve access between I-270, Germantown, and Damascus. The old segment of MD 27 became Henderson Corner Road.

== Junction list ==
County	Location	mi	km	Destinations	Notes
Montgomery	Germantown	0.00	0.00	MD 355 (Frederick Road) to I-270 / Ridge Road south – Gaithersburg, Clarksburg	Southern terminus
Montgomery	Damascus	6.56	10.56	MD 108 east (Main Street) to MD 124 – Laytonsville	Western terminus of MD 108
Montgomery	Damascus	8.75	14.08	MD 80 west (Kemptown Road) – Urbana	Eastern terminus of MD 80
Howard	No major junctions				
Frederick	Mount Airy	11.76	18.93	MD 144 east (Old National Pike) – Lisbon	Officially MD 144A; western terminus of MD 144A
Carroll	Mount Airy	12.17	19.59	I-70 / US 40 (Baltimore National Pike) – Frederick, Baltimore	I-70 Exit 68
Carroll	Mount Airy	12.39	19.94	Main Street north to MD 808 north	East leg of intersection is exit ramp from westbound I-70
Carroll	Mount Airy	15.05	24.22	MD 808 south (Main Street)	Officially MD 808A
Carroll	Taylorsville	20.65	33.23	MD 26 (Liberty Road) – Eldersburg, Libertytown	
Carroll		22.73	36.58	MD 407 west (Marston Road) – Marston	Eastern terminus of MD 407
Carroll	Westminster	31.01	49.91	MD 97 / MD 140 (Baltimore Boulevard) – Baltimore, Taneytown, Gettysburg	Partial cloverleaf interchange
Carroll	Westminster	31.78	51.14	Old Manchester Road north	Unsigned MD 852G
Carroll	Mexico	33.61	54.09	MD 482 east (Hampstead Mexico Road) – Hampstead	Western terminus of MD 482
Carroll	Mexico	34.04	54.78	Old Manchester Road south	Unsigned MD 852G
Carroll	Manchester	39.17	63.04	MD 30 (Hanover Pike) – Hanover, PA, Hampstead, Reisterstown	Northern terminus
1.000 mi = 1.609 km; 1.000 km = 0.621 mi

== Related routes ==
=== Auxiliary routes ===
MD 27 has five auxiliary routes between Westminster and Manchester.

- MD 27A is the designation for Random Ridge Road, a 0.15-mile (0.24 km) east–west connecting road north of Mexico. The highway begins at MD 852F, which parallels the southbound side of MD 27, intersects MD 27, and ends east of an intersection with county-maintained Random Ridge Road, which parallels the northbound side of MD 27.
- MD 27B is the designation for the unnamed 0.01-mile (0.016 km) connector between MD 27 and MD 852B, which parallels the southbound side of MD 27.
- MD 27C is the designation for the unnamed 0.01-mile (0.016 km) connector between MD 27 and MD 852C near the latter highway's southern end. MD 852C parallels the northbound side of MD 27 near Manchester.
- MD 27D is the designation for the unnamed 0.02-mile (0.032 km) connector between MD 27 and MD 852C near the latter highway's midpoint.
- MD 27E is the designation for the unnamed 0.02-mile (0.032 km) connector between MD 27 and MD 852C near the latter highway's northern end, south of Westminster Street.

=== Father Hurley Boulevard ===
Father Hurley Boulevard is a 2.59-mile-long (4.17 km) county highway that runs from MD 118 (Germantown Road) north to I-270 (Eisenhower Memorial Highway) within Germantown in Montgomery County. North of I-270, the highway continues as a 1.07-mile-long (1.72 km) county-maintained portion of Ridge Road that continues to the southern terminus of MD 27 at MD 355 (Frederick Road). Both Father Hurley Boulevard and the county-maintained portion of Ridge Road are part of the National Highway System. Father Hurley Boulevard, named for a parish priest and community organizer, was constructed in several sections from the 1970s to the 2010s. In the 1980s, the Maryland State Highway Administration (SHA) had long-range plans to extend MD 27 south to I-270. However, Montgomery County needed the highway built in the 1990s, so they directed the private sector to build the Ridge Road extension. Montgomery County eventually assumed maintenance of Ridge Road south of MD 355 because they could not agree with SHA on transferring maintenance to the state.

Father Hurley Boulevard begins at MD 118 (Germantown Road) in the unincorporated town of Germantown. The county highway heads north as a four-lane divided highway and crosses a tributary of Little Seneca Creek before it crosses over CSX's Metropolitan Subdivision, which carries MARC's Brunswick Line. Father Hurley Boulevard meets the west end of Middlebrook Road before crossing another tributary of Little Seneca Creek just east of its impoundment, Lake Churchill. At Crystal Rock Drive, the highway expands to six lanes and crosses over Century Boulevard before meeting I-270 (Eisenhower Memorial Highway) at a partial cloverleaf interchange. At I-270, the six-lane divided highway's name changes from Father Hurley Boulevard to Ridge Road, which heads northeast to a four-legged intersection with MD 355 (Frederick Road) and the south end of MD 27.

Father Hurley Boulevard is named for Monsignor Leonard Hurley, a Roman Catholic priest who founded and led Mother Seton Parish in Germantown between 1974 and 1987, helped found the community organization Germantown Alliance, and led the narration to a worldwide television and radio audience for John F. Kennedy's requiem mass in 1963. Montgomery County renamed Germantown Drive for Father Hurley in 1987 for his ecumenical and civic work. Mother Seton Parish is located at the intersection of Father Hurley Boulevard and Middlebrook Road. Father Hurley Boulevard has no direct predecessor road. However, much of the county highway north of the railroad ran close to Waters Road, which formerly extended north from MD 118 at Germantown station and was part of MD 120.

The first piece of Father Hurley Boulevard was constructed as a two-lane road from Wisteria Drive north through the intersection with Middlebrook Road to Wynnfield Drive between 1970 and 1979. By 1991, the first piece had been extended north from Wynnfield Drive to Crystal Rock Drive, and the highway had been expanded to a four-lane divided highway. The piece of Father Hurley Boulevard north to I-270, the remainder of the Ridge Road extension, and the I-270 interchange were under construction by 1995 and completed by 1997. As of 1998, the new highway was six lanes from Crystal Rock Drive to the Observation Drive intersection on Ridge Road and four lanes to MD 355. The highway's bridges across what is now Century Boulevard were completed in 1995, but the boulevard under them was not built until 2014 and 2015.

The next piece of Father Hurley Boulevard was completed south of the railroad as a two-lane road from Dawson Farm Road to Hopkins Farm Road between 1993 and 1998. This segment was extended north to Harvest Glen Way just south of the railroad by 2002. The extension of the northern portion south of Wisteria Drive toward Waterford Hills Boulevard was under way by 2004 and complete as a two-lane divided highway by 2008; within that time span, Ridge Road was expanded to six lanes from Observation Drive to MD 355. Father Hurley Boulevard's bridge across the railroad was completed in 2010. The highway between Waterford Hills Boulevard and Harvest Glen Way over the railroad, the portion between MD 118 and Hopkins Road, and expansion of the two-lane sections south of Wisteria Drive to four lanes were completed by 2012.

SHA had included an extension of MD 27 south to I-270 among its long-term projects since, at latest, 1988. However, the MD 27 extension was not a high priority for SHA in the 1990s. Montgomery County's infrastructure needs in Germantown outstriped SHA's capacity, so county arranged for the private sector to fund and construct the Ridge Road extension, the adjacent part of Father Hurley Boulevard, and the I-270 interchange. Although Montgomery County arranged for the highway's construction, they did not initially own Ridge Road between I-270 and MD 355. Instead, they assumed SHA would assume ownership based on the 1988 long-term projects list. However, SHA requested Montgomery County take over maintenance of other state highways, such as part of MD 117, in exchange for SHA taking over the Ridge Road extension. Transfer of ownership from the private entity to Montgomery County occurred in 2002.
