= Pearre-Metcalfe House =

Historic house in Maryland, United States

- U.S. National Register of Historic Places
- Location within Maryland Location within the United States
- Location: 9084 Albaugh Road, New Windsor, Maryland
- Coordinates: 39°28′58″N 77°9′57″W
- Area: 35 acres (14 ha)
- Built: 1859
- Built by: Biefdler, Francis L.
- Architectural style: Greek Revival
- NRHP reference No.: 79001132
- Added to NRHP: July 2, 1979

The Pearre-Metcalfe House is a historic home located at New Windsor, Frederick County, Maryland, United States. It is a brick Greek Revival style farmhouse, built about 1859. There is a small, brick springhouse with corbeled brick cornice and tin roof on the property.

The Pearre-Metcalfe House was listed on the National Register of Historic Places in 1979.
