= Manchester, Maryland =

- Town
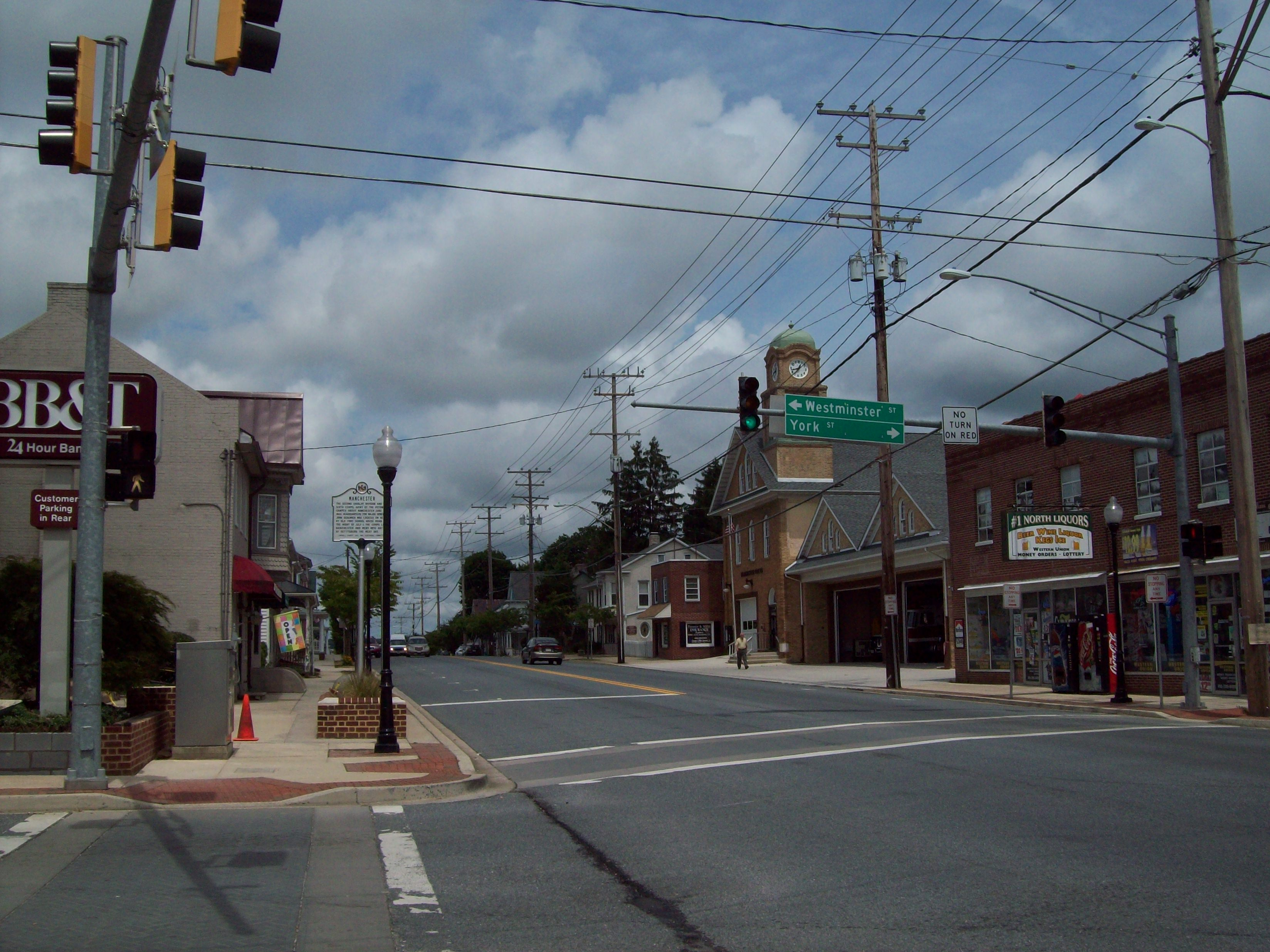
- Looking north in downtown Manchester, Maryland

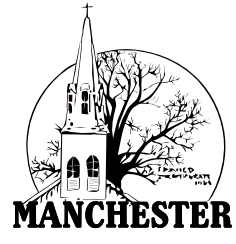
- Flag Seal

- Location of Manchester, Maryland
- Coordinates: 39°39′42″N 76°53′17″W
- Country: United States
- State: Maryland
- County: Carroll
- Incorporated: 1833

Area
  - Total: 2.33 sq mi (6.04 km^{2})
  - Land: 2.32 sq mi (6.02 km^{2})
  - Water: 0.0039 sq mi (0.01 km^{2})
- Elevation: 991 ft (302 m)

Population (2020)
  - Total: 5,408
  - Density: 2,325.3/sq mi (897.82/km^{2})
- Time zone: UTC-5 (Eastern (EST))
  - Summer (DST): UTC-4 (EDT)
- ZIP codes: 21088, 21102
- Area codes: 410, 443, 667
- FIPS code: 24-49950
- GNIS feature ID: 0590726
- Website: Town website

Manchester is a small incorporated town in northeastern Carroll County, Maryland, United States, located just south of the Pennsylvania state line and north of Baltimore. As of the 2020 census, Manchester had a population of 5,408.

Manchester was incorporated in 1833 and is the second oldest incorporated area in Carroll County after Westminster, which was incorporated in 1818. The town was originally formed as a part of Baltimore County, before the creation of Carroll County in 1837. It is governed by an elected mayor and an elected five-person town council.

Manchester lies in the humid continental climate region, marked by cold and snowy winters but humid and hot summers. This climate is ideal for growing farmed crops in the summer such as tomatoes, sweet corn and squash, leaving much of the outlying area marked with large tracts of farmland. Manchester is a rural commuting town where residents travel to work in the greater Baltimore Metropolitan Area and the greater Washington Metropolitan Area.

== History ==
Manchester was incorporated by the Maryland General Assembly in 1833. The town was originally part of Baltimore County and became part of Carroll County when Carroll County was created in 1837 from portions of Baltimore and Frederick counties. Manchester was originally known as "Manchester Germantown"; Germantown referred to a nearby community west of Manchester that was later incorporated into the town.

Before European settlement, the area that became Manchester was occupied by the Susquehannock people. The center of town developed near the intersection of two important Native American trails, one connecting the Potomac and Susquehanna rivers and another connecting the Conewago Creek area with the Patapsco River.

The first land grant in the area, a 150-acre tract known as "Steven's Hope", was granted to Samuel Stevens near present-day Lineboro Road. Early European settlers included English settlers, followed by settlers of German descent. In 1758, a land grant touching the present town limits was issued as "German Churche". In 1765, Captain Richard Richards received a 67-acre tract called "New Market" adjoining "German Churche" and laid out the town, naming it after Manchester, England.

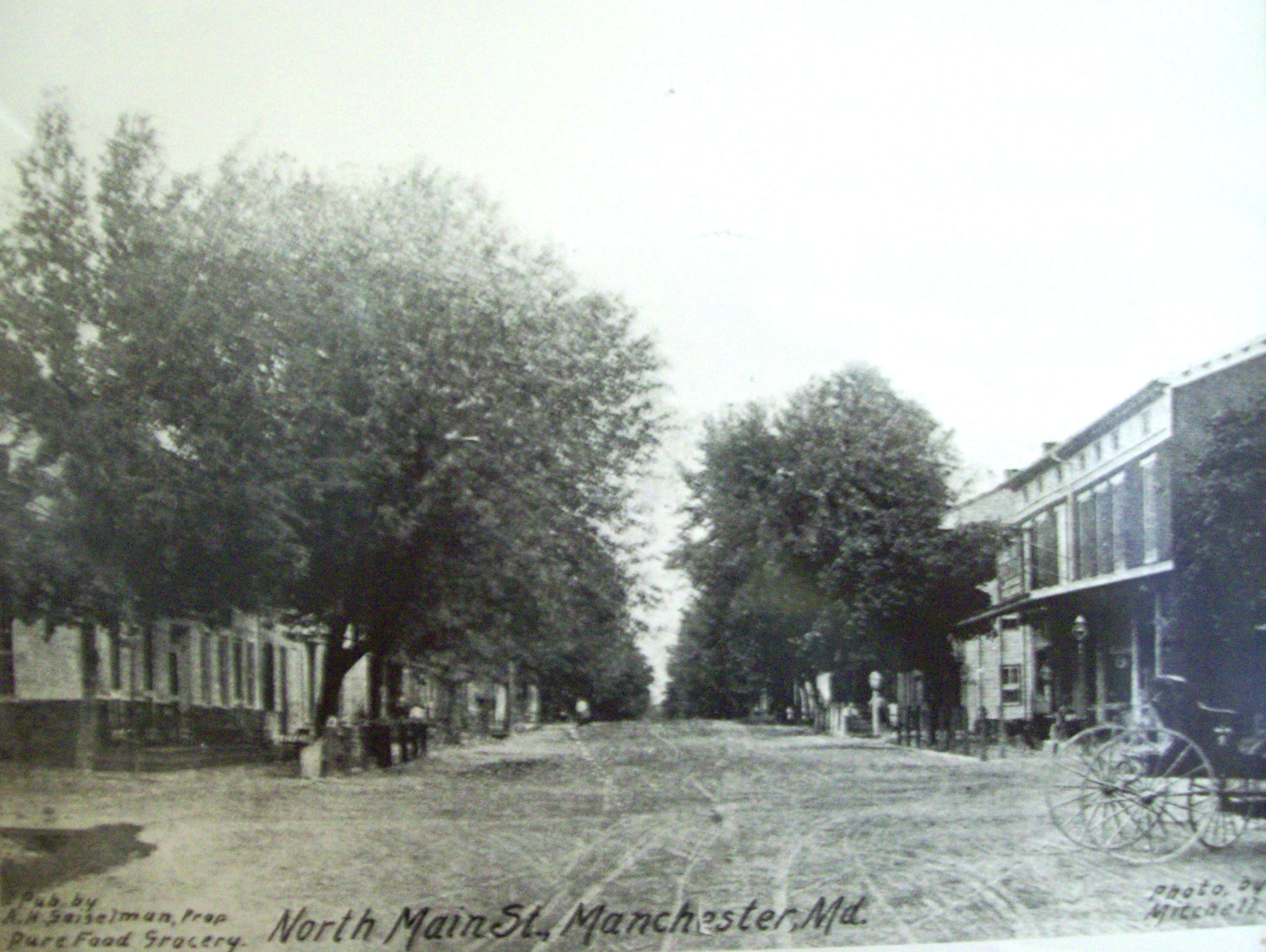
North Main Street, circa 1900

From the eighteenth century into the early twentieth century, German and Pennsylvania Dutch were commonly spoken in the area. Local food customs gave rise to two of Manchester's nicknames: "Noodle Doosey", from the practice of drying homemade noodles on lines outside homes, and "Gingercake Town", from the local tradition of making ginger cakes. Manchester was also a cigar-manufacturing town from after the Civil War until about 1930, when mechanized cigar production made hand production less economical.

Manchester was the site of one of Carroll County's early colleges. Irving College, named for Washington Irving, was established in 1858 by Dr. Ferdinand Dieffenbach. The school was affected by the Civil War and by Dieffenbach's death, later became Irving Institute in 1886, and closed by 1893.

During the American Civil War, Manchester served as a camping area for the Union Sixth Army Corps under General John Sedgwick on July 1, 1863. The corps marched toward Gettysburg the following day.

Manchester has had several local newspapers. The Manchester Gazette began weekly publication in 1870 and ceased in 1872. The Manchester Enterprise began publication on December 11, 1880, and the Telephone Messenger was established in 1888.

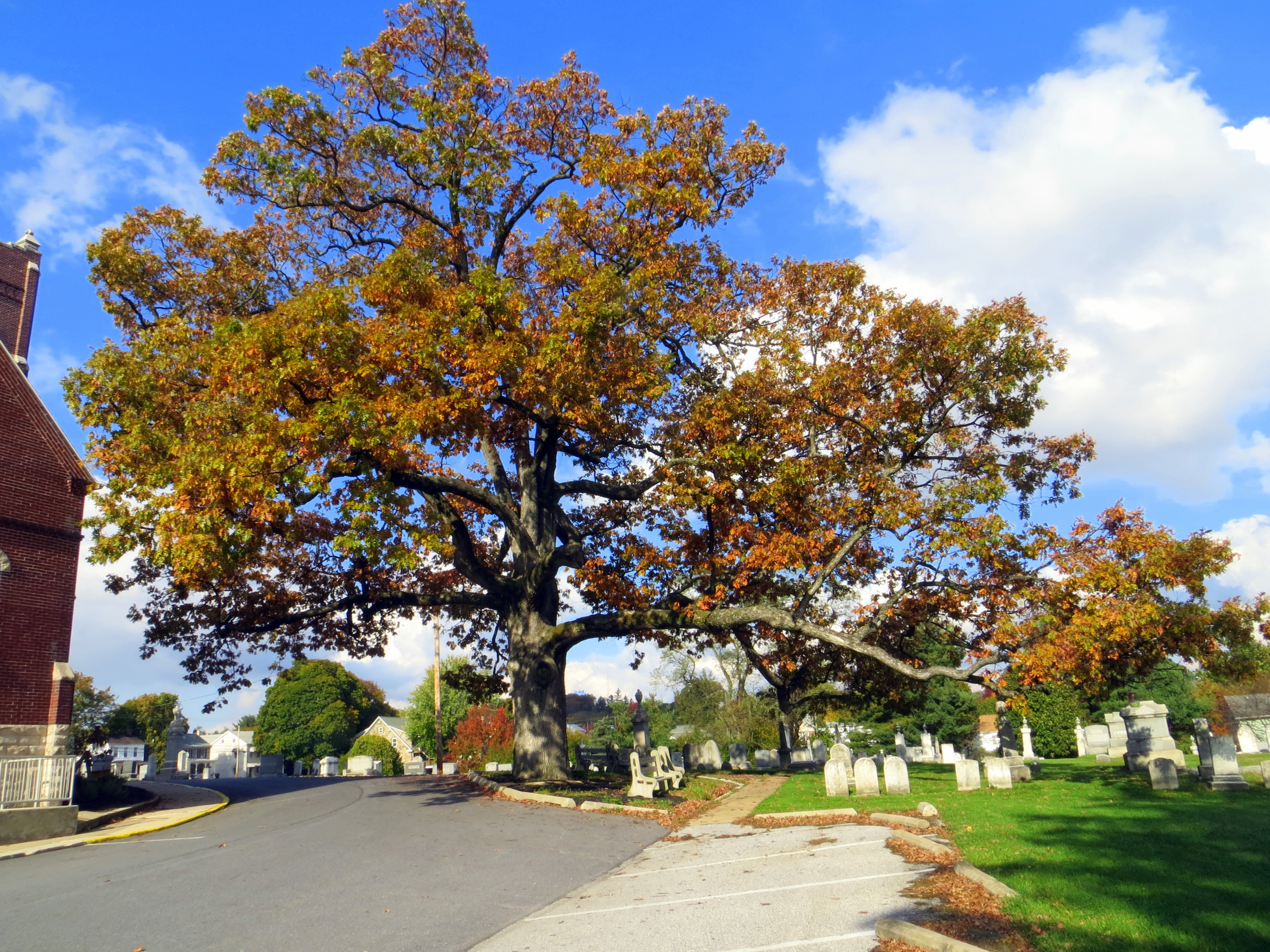
"Lutheran White Oak"

The official seal of Manchester depicts a church steeple and a leafless white oak tree, with the words "Founded 1765 Incorporated 1834". The tree represents the Lutheran White Oak, a local symbol associated with Manchester's early German church community.

== Demographics ==
Historical population
| Census | Pop. | Note | %± |
|---|---|---|---|
| 1850 | 517 | | — |
| 1860 | 646 | | 25.0% |
| 1870 | 755 | | 16.9% |
| 1880 | 640 | | −15.2% |
| 1890 | 273 | | −57.3% |
| 1900 | 609 | | 123.1% |
| 1910 | 523 | | −14.1% |
| 1920 | 546 | | 4.4% |
| 1930 | 643 | | 17.8% |
| 1940 | 763 | | 18.7% |
| 1950 | 1,027 | | 34.6% |
| 1960 | 1,108 | | 7.9% |
| 1970 | 1,466 | | 32.3% |
| 1980 | 1,830 | | 24.8% |
| 1990 | 2,810 | | 53.6% |
| 2000 | 3,329 | | 18.5% |
| 2010 | 4,808 | | 44.4% |
| 2020 | 5,408 | | 12.5% |
U.S. Decennial Census

=== Income and poverty ===
The median income for a household in the town was $57,390, and the median income for a family was $62,679. Males had a median income of $37,794 versus $29,118 for females. The per capita income for the town was $20,956. About 0.9% of families and 2.1% of the population were below the poverty line, including 2.1% of those under age 18 and 4.7% of those age 65 or over.

=== 2020 census ===
As of the 2020 census, Manchester had a population of 5,408. The median age was 40.2 years. 25.5% of residents were under the age of 18 and 16.6% of residents were 65 years of age or older. For every 100 females there were 95.6 males, and for every 100 females age 18 and over there were 92.2 males age 18 and over.

99.7% of residents lived in urban areas, while 0.3% lived in rural areas.

There were 1,898 households in Manchester, of which 38.5% had children under the age of 18 living in them. Of all households, 60.7% were married-couple households, 13.3% were households with a male householder and no spouse or partner present, and 20.1% were households with a female householder and no spouse or partner present. About 20.5% of all households were made up of individuals and 10.4% had someone living alone who was 65 years of age or older.

There were 1,973 housing units, of which 3.8% were vacant. The homeowner vacancy rate was 1.5% and the rental vacancy rate was 5.9%.

Racial composition as of the 2020 census
| Race | Number | Percent |
|---|---|---|
| White | 4,660 | 86.2% |
| Black or African American | 191 | 3.5% |
| American Indian and Alaska Native | 12 | 0.2% |
| Asian | 140 | 2.6% |
| Native Hawaiian and Other Pacific Islander | 1 | 0.0% |
| Some other race | 104 | 1.9% |
| Two or more races | 300 | 5.5% |
| Hispanic or Latino (of any race) | 236 | 4.4% |

=== 2010 census ===
As of the census of 2010, there were 4,808 people, 1,632 households, and 1,269 families residing in the town. The population density was 2,054.7 inhabitants per square mile (793.3/km^{2}). There were 1,713 housing units at an average density of 732.1 per square mile (282.7/km^{2}). The racial makeup of the town was 92.0% White, 3.3% African American, 1.6% Asian, 0.1% Pacific Islander, 1.6% from other races, and 1.5% from two or more races. Hispanic or Latino of any race were 3.5% of the population.

There were 1,632 households, of which 44.1% had children under the age of 18 living with them, 64.2% were married couples living together, 8.8% had a female householder with no husband present, 4.8% had a male householder with no wife present, and 22.2% were non-families. 18.3% of all households were made up of individuals, and 7.2% had someone living alone who was 65 years of age or older. The average household size was 2.88 and the average family size was 3.26.

The median age in the town was 37.3 years. 27.5% of residents were under the age of 18; 7.7% were between the ages of 18 and 24; 27.6% were from 25 to 44; 26.7% were from 45 to 64; and 10.3% were 65 years of age or older. The gender makeup of the town was 48.8% male and 51.2% female.

== Geography ==
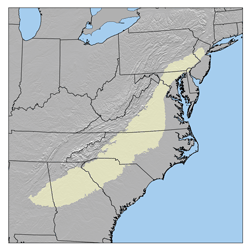
Piedmont plateau region (shaded)

=== Topography ===
Manchester is located at 39°39′42″N 76°53′17″W (39.661762, -76.888014). According to the United States Census Bureau, the town has a total area of 2.35 square miles (6.09 km^{2}), of which 2.34 square miles (6.06 km^{2}) is land and 0.01 square miles (0.03 km^{2}) is water.

Manchester is located on the Piedmont Plateau, west of the coastal lowlands of the Chesapeake Bay, in an area of rolling upland. Manchester's environs are the highest point in the state of Maryland east of the Appalachian Mountains.

=== Climate ===
Manchester lies in the transition zone between the humid subtropical and humid continental climate zones, and experiences higher annual snowfall and colder temperatures than the southern half of Maryland, which lies in the humid subtropical climate zone.

The hottest summer month is July, during which temperatures average a high of 87 °F (31 °C) with an average low of 63 °F (17 °C). The coldest month is January with an average high of 38 °F (3 °C) and average low of 21 °F (-6 °C) Manchester receives an annual precipitation of 43.67 inches (110.9 cm).

== Events ==
During the summer, Manchester hosts the Manchester Volunteer Fire Department Carnival. The carnival lasts several nights and usually coincides with Independence Day. A fireworks display is set off to celebrate the holiday.

Once a year, a female member of the Manchester community is chosen as "Miss Manchester Fire Queen".

== Parks ==
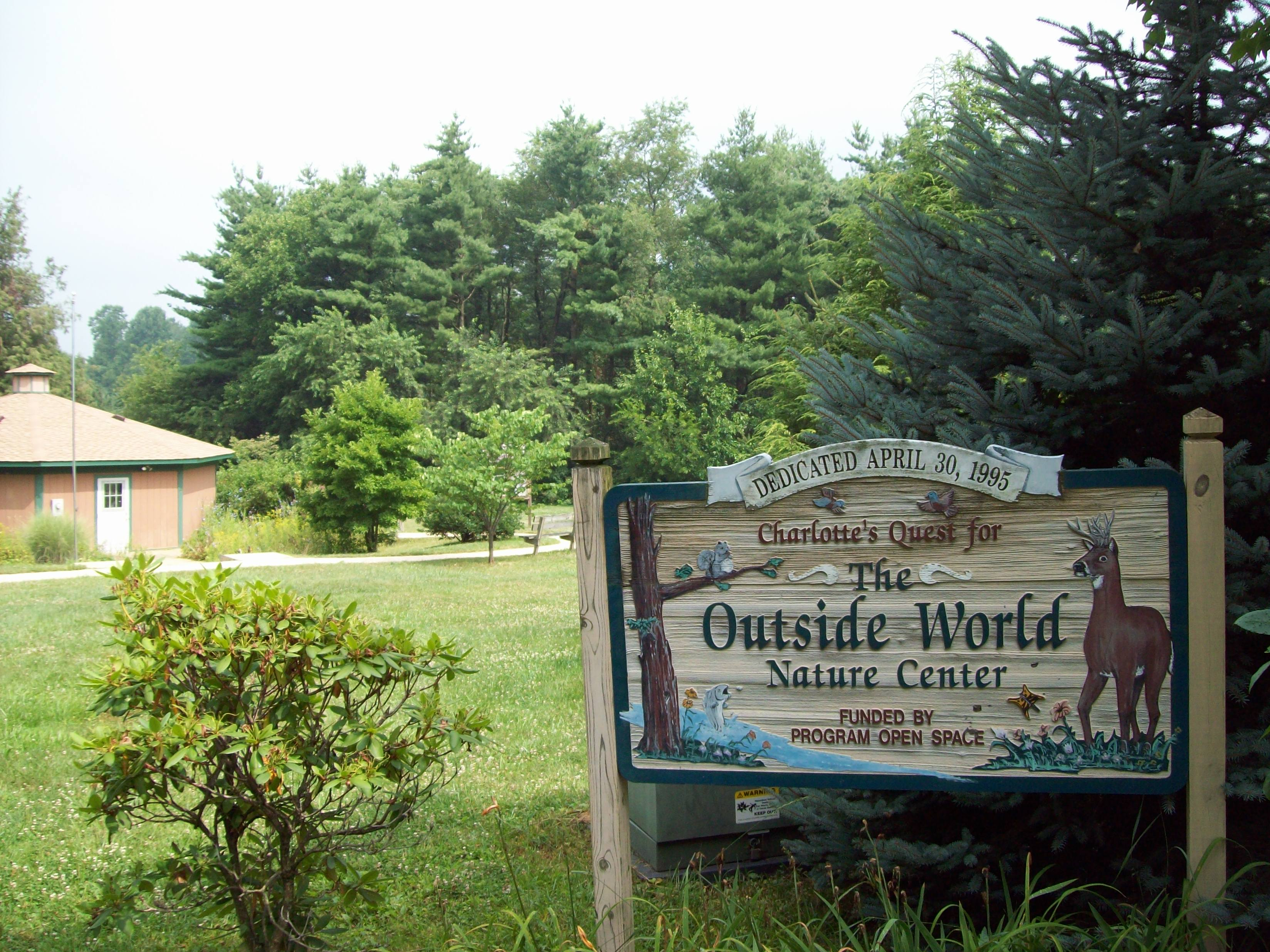
Pine Valley Park

Manchester has three major parks, totaling 82 acres (0.33 km^{2}) of developed and undeveloped land. Manchester has the most park area of any town in Carroll County.

- Christmas Tree Park is located in the northeastern part of Manchester and has the largest developed park land in the area. It is the home of several baseball diamonds, three tennis courts, multiple playgrounds for children, and picnic and grilling areas. In the less developed and wooded area there are three small to large ponds. The park is mostly populated with pine trees that resemble Christmas trees.
- Pine Valley Park, located in the northern part of town, has more than 60 acres (0.24 km^{2}) of land and over 4.5 miles (7.2 km) of trails, a natural spring, a pond and pine and hardwood forests. Opened in July 1995, it was created as an "open classroom" for nearby Manchester Elementary School. The school students voted and selected the name "Charlotte's Quest" for the classroom as a tribute to Charlotte B. Collett, the then Town Councilwoman who oversaw the project.

== Government ==
Town office

Manchester has a democratically elected mayor and town council. The mayor and council members serve four-year terms. The town government is based at Town Hall, 3337 Victory Street.

As of 2026, the mayor is Ryan Olson. Members of the town council are Adam Randell, Grant Miller, Will Cuneo, Chad Seifert and Lexi Bell. Olson was elected mayor in 2023 after previously serving two terms on the town council.

In the Maryland General Assembly, Manchester is part of Senate District 5, represented by Justin D. Ready, and House of Delegates District 5, represented by Christopher Eric Bouchat, April R. Rose, and Chris L. Tomlinson.

At the federal level, Manchester is located in Maryland's 2nd congressional district, represented by John "Johnny O" Olszewski Jr.

== Education ==
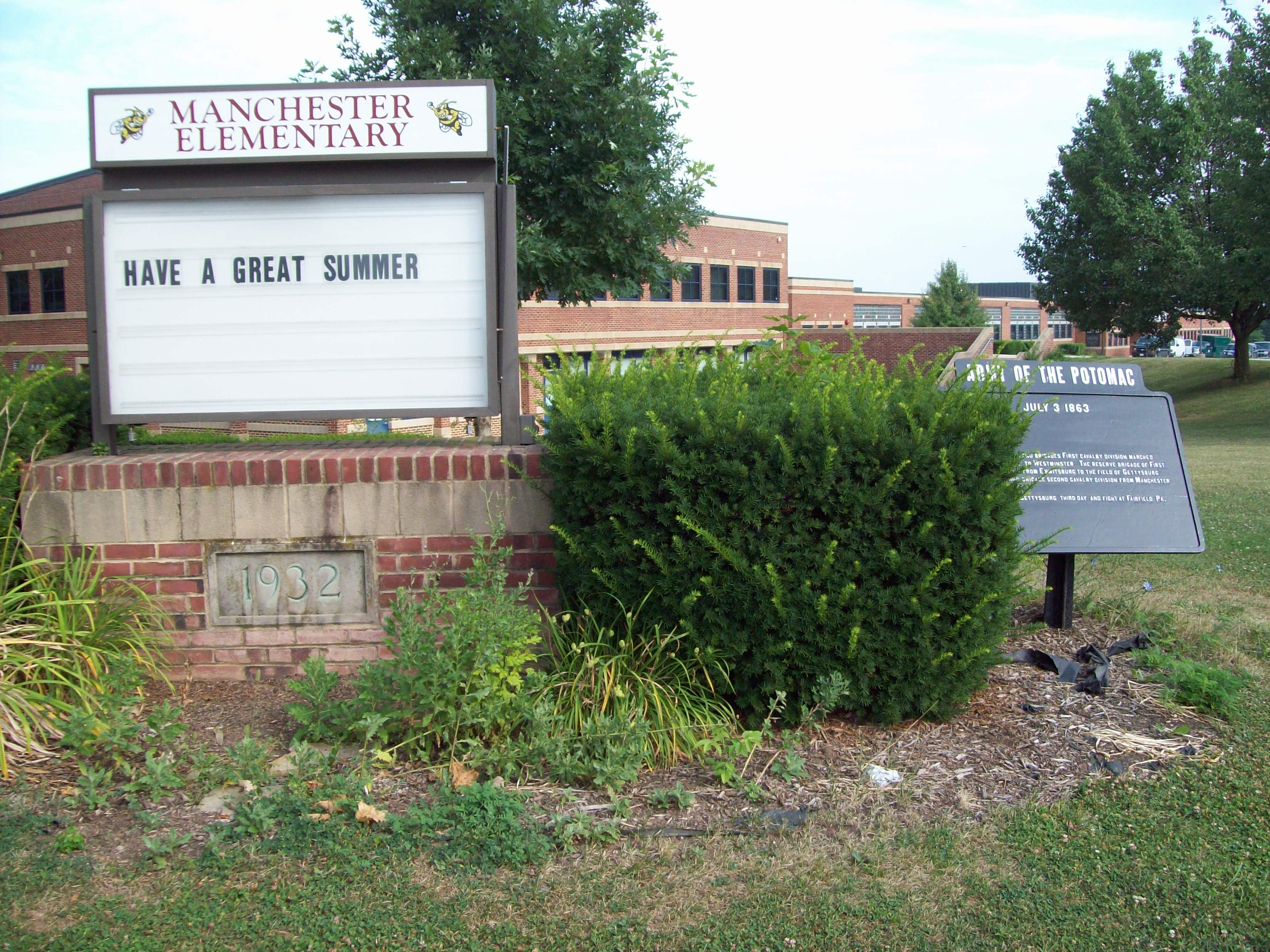
Manchester Elementary School

Manchester hosts three public schools. Two of which are primary schools and the other is a secondary school.

Manchester Elementary School was originally built in 1932 as Manchester High School. The school's current population is 604 students in pre-kindergarten, kindergarten, and grades 1 through 5.

Ebb Valley Elementary School opened in August 2008 with a student population of 467. Ebb Valley is a two-story school accommodating kindergarten through fifth grade students.

Manchester Valley High School opened in August 2009 to help alleviate overpopulation at North Carroll High School in Hampstead. Teaching grades 9 through 12, its first graduation ceremony occurred on June 1, 2011. The two high schools, Manchester Valley and North Carroll, merged as one school once again after North Carroll was shut down in 2016.

== Infrastructure ==
=== Transportation ===
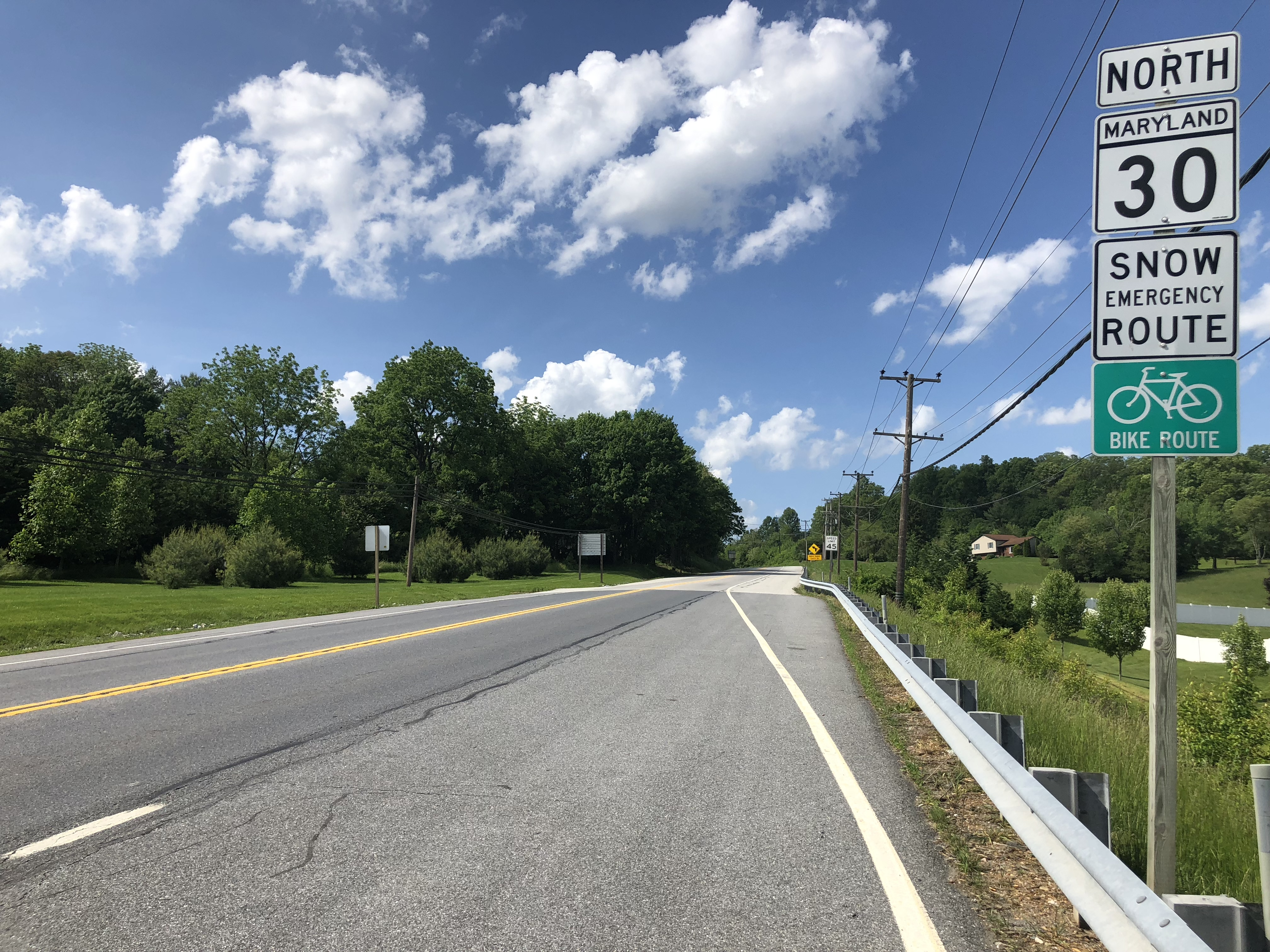
MD 30 northbound departing Manchester

Manchester has three state designated highways within the town limits.

- Maryland Route 30
- Maryland Route 27
- Maryland Route 86

Traffic congestion is high, southbound, in the morning as commuters make their way to the greater Baltimore area. Traffic is also high in the evening as commuters make their way north to Pennsylvania via Pennsylvania Route 94 and southwest to Westminster via Maryland Route 27. A Manchester bypass along Route 30 has been proposed since 1960 and supported by the Carroll County government, but opposed by governor Parris Glendening over urban sprawl concerns, and remains unbuilt.

=== Utilities ===
In 1907, AT&T was granted rights to operate a telegraph and telephone line in Manchester, but telephone service was not utilized until 1921. Land line-based telephone service has been provided by Verizon since its creation on June 30, 2000.

Glen Rock Electric Light and Power Company first ran electric lines through town in 1922. In 1999, Maryland deregulated the electricity industry. As the result, residents of Manchester may choose from eleven electricity suppliers in the Baltimore Gas & Electric service area.

Cable television is provided to residents by Comcast inside Carroll County. Comcast began operations in the county after purchasing the now defunct Adelphia Communications Corporation on July 31, 2006.

Water is provided to town residents by the town's Public Works Department.

== Media ==
A video depicting some of the main streets in Manchester

== See also ==
- List of incorporated places in Maryland
- Lineboro, Maryland
- Mason–Dixon line
- Millers, Maryland
