= Mexico, Carroll County, Maryland =

Unincorporated community in Maryland, U.S.

Coordinates: 39°36′03″N 76°56′40″W

Mexico is an unincorporated community in Carroll County, Maryland, United States. It lies at an elevation of 968 feet (295 m).
