= Maryland Route 851 =

State highway in Maryland, United States

Maryland Route 851

Route information
- Maintained by MDSHA
- Length: 1.46 mi (2.35 km)
- Existed: 1963–present

Major junctions
- South end: MD 32 near Sykesville
- North end: MD 32 in Sykesville

Location
- Country: United States
- State: Maryland
- Counties: Howard, Carroll

Highway system
- Maryland highway system; Interstate; US; State; Scenic Byways
← MD 850	→ MD 852

Maryland Route 851 (MD 851) is a state highway in the U.S. state of Maryland. The state highway runs 1.46 miles (2.35 km) as a north–south highway between junctions with MD 32 in Sykesville. MD 851 is the old alignment of MD 32 through Sykesville, which was paved by 1910. The state highway was designated when the MD 32 bypass of Sykesville opened in 1963. MD 851 was relocated at its northern end in 2006.

== Route description ==
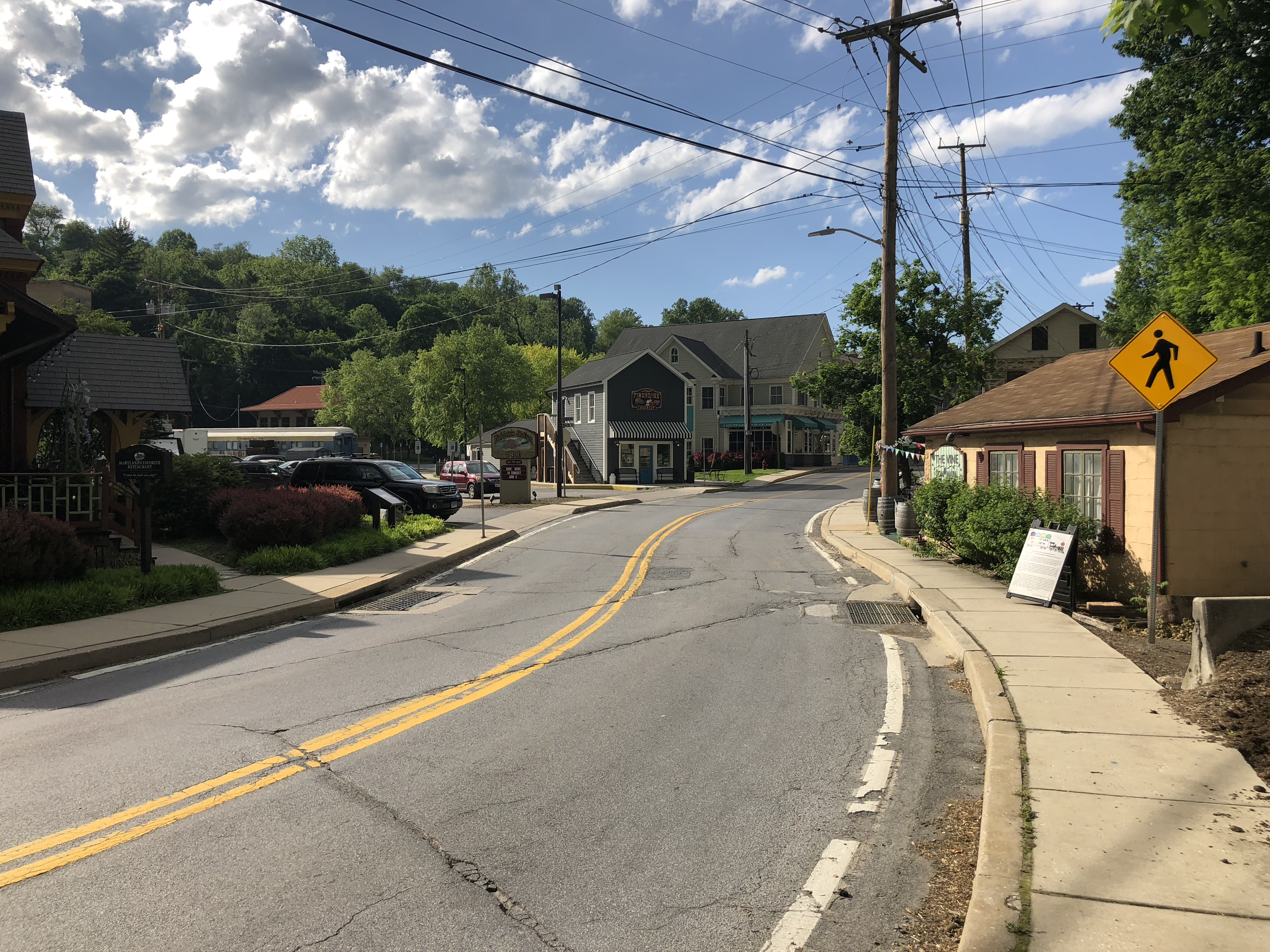
View north along MD 851 in Sykesville

MD 851 begins at an intersection with MD 32 (Sykesville Road) in Howard County south of Sykesville. The state highway heads north as two-lane undivided West Friendship Road along the edge of Hugg-Thomas Wildlife Management Area into the narrow valley of the Patapsco River. MD 851 traverses the river and crosses CSX's Old Main Line Subdivision railroad line at-grade as the highway enters the town of Sykesville in Carroll County, where the highway's name changes to Main Street. The state highway passes through the Sykesville Historic District. At the northern end of the town center, MD 851 turns northeast onto Springfield Avenue while Spout Hill Road continues straight toward Springfield Presbyterian Church. The state highway passes Millard Cooper Park, a park and ride lot, and Third Avenue before reaching its northern terminus at MD 32 (Sykesville Road). The roadway continues east as Springfield Avenue into the Springfield Hospital Center, which includes the preserved Warfield Complex.

== History ==
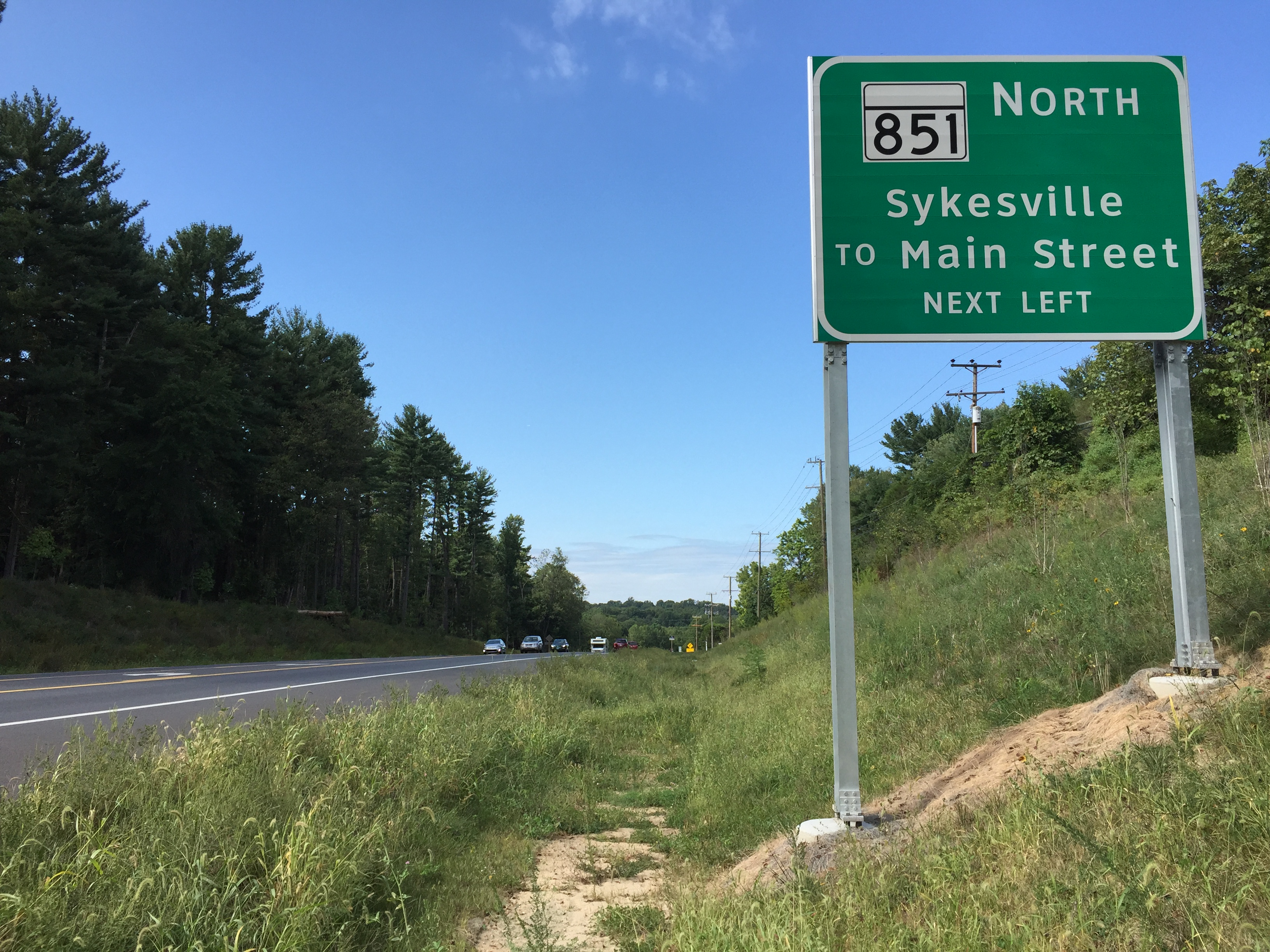
Sign for MD 851 on MD 32 south of Sykesville

MD 851 forms much of the old alignment of MD 32 through Sykesville. Sykesville Road was already paved for 2 miles (3.2 km) on either side of Sykesville when the highway was designated part of the original state road between West Friendship and Westminster by the Maryland State Roads Commission in 1909. MD 851 was assigned to MD 32's old alignment through Sykesville shortly after the MD 32 bypass of Sykesville opened following the completion of the bypass's original aluminum girder bridge across the Patapsco River in 1963; this bridge was replaced in 2004. MD 851 originally continued north from Third Avenue to meet MD 32 at a tangent on the north side of the town. MD 851 was relocated north of Third Avenue in 2006 to create a perpendicular intersection with MD 32, which was also relocated as part of the project, and to provide a better connection from both state highways to Springfield Hospital Center. MD 851 temporarily extended east of MD 32 through a roundabout to a dead end in 2006; the portion of highway east of MD 32 was transferred to the town of Sykesville in 2007.

== Junction list ==
County	Location	mi	km	Destinations	Notes
Howard		0.00	0.00	MD 32 (Sykesville Road) – West Friendship	Southern terminus
Carroll	Sykesville	1.46	2.35	MD 32 (Sykesville Road) / Springfield Avenue east – Eldersburg	Northern terminus
1.000 mi = 1.609 km; 1.000 km = 0.621 mi

== Auxiliary routes ==
MD 851 has six existing auxiliary routes and at least one former auxiliary route. These highways are sections of old alignment of MD 32 between West Friendship and Eldersburg. MD 851A and MD 851B are in Carroll County; MD 851C was also in Carroll County. MD 851D, MD 851F, MD 851H, and MD 851J are in Howard County.

- MD 851A is the designation for the unnamed 0.05-mile (0.080 km) spur of old alignment from MD 32 to a dead end parallel to the southbound side of MD 32 on the southern edge of Eldersburg.
- MD 851B is the designation for the unnamed 0.04-mile (0.064 km) section of old alignment between two dead ends around Church Street on the southbound side of MD 32 in Flohrville south of Eldersburg.
- MD 851C was the designation for an unnamed 0.13-mile (0.21 km) spur from Third Street to a dead end near MD 851's northern terminus in Sykesville. MD 851C was transferred to municipal maintenance in 2006.
- MD 851D is the designation for the unnamed 0.15-mile (0.24 km) section of old alignment between two dead ends on the northbound side of MD 32 just north of MD 32's interchange with Interstate 70. MD 851D is connected to MD 32 by Livestock Road.
- MD 851F is the designation for Deer Hill Road, which runs 0.15 miles (0.24 km) from MD 32 to a dead end on the northbound side of MD 32 just south of MD 851's southern terminus near Sykesville.
- MD 851H is the designation for the unnamed 0.21-mile (0.34 km) spur from a dead end to MD 32 on the northbound side of MD 32 north of West Friendship. MD 851H is also connected to MD 32 near its southern end by MD 32B.
- MD 851J is the designation for Butterfly Court, which runs 0.17 miles (0.27 km) from MD 99 (Old Frederick Road) north to a dead end on the northbound side of MD 32 north of West Friendship. MD 851J originally extended a further 0.11 miles (0.18 km) south to a dead end on the southern side of MD 99. The southern section was removed from the state highway system in 2003; the West Friendship Volunteer Fire Department now sits south of MD 99.
