= Maryland Route 99 =

State highway in Howard County, Maryland, US, known as Old Frederick Rd

Maryland Route 99
- Old Frederick Road
- Maryland Route 99 highlighted in red

Route information
- Maintained by MDSHA
- Length: 7.57 mi (12.18 km)
- Existed: 1927–present

Major junctions
- West end: MD 32 near West Friendship
- East end: US 29 in Ellicott City

Location
- Country: United States
- State: Maryland
- Counties: Howard

Highway system
- Maryland highway system; Interstate; US; State; Scenic Byways
← MD 97	→ MD 100

Maryland Route 99 (MD 99) is a state highway in the U.S. state of Maryland. Known as Old Frederick Road, the state highway runs 7.57 miles (12.18 km) from MD 32 near West Friendship east to U.S. Route 29 (US 29) in Ellicott City. MD 99 parallels the north side of Interstate 70 (I-70) through a rural and suburban area in northeastern Howard County. MD 99, which follows the original 18th-century road west from Baltimore, was constructed as part of three state highways: MD 99, the original MD 100, and MD 105. All three highways were constructed between the early 1920s and early 1930s. MD 99 originally turned south along St. Johns Lane to US 40 and MD 144; in 1956, the state highway was rerouted along part of MD 100 and all of MD 105 to downtown Ellicott City. MD 99's eastern terminus was rolled back to US 29 in two steps in the late 1970s and late 1980s.

== Route description ==
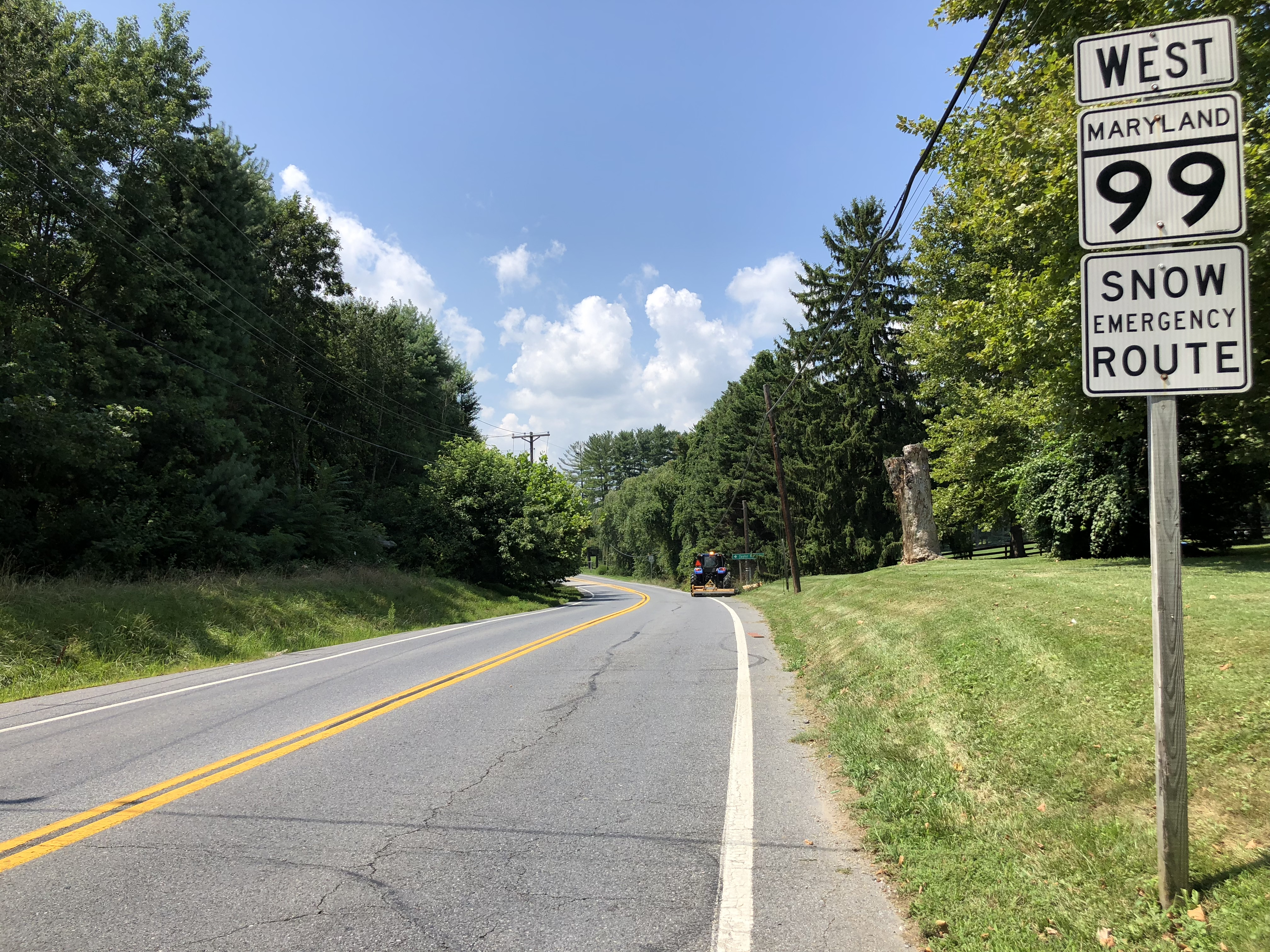
View west along MD 99 in Woodstock

MD 99 begins at an intersection with MD 32 (Sykesville Road) at Slacks Corner a short distance north of MD 32's interchange with I-70 in West Friendship. Old Frederick Road continues west as a county highway that parallels the north side of I-70 west to Twin Arch Road near Mount Airy. MD 99 heads east as a two-lane undivided road and immediately intersects the old alignment of MD 32, which is unsigned MD 851J and named Butterfly Court. The state highway mostly follows the height of land between the watersheds of the Patapsco River to the north and the Patuxent River to the south. MD 99 passes through the communities of Alpha, which is home to Marriotts Ridge High School to the north of the road, and Henryton Heights, which contains Alpha Ridge Community Park. Continuing east, the state highway intersects a pair of county highways, Marriottsville Road and Woodstock Road. Marriottsville Road heads north toward the village of Marriottsville on the Patapsco River and south to junctions with I-70 and US 40. Woodstock Road heads north to the village of Woodstock, also on the Patapsco River, where the highway becomes MD 125.

East of Woodstock Road, MD 99 crosses Davis Branch and enters a suburban area on the north side of Ellicott City. The state highway begins to parallel I-70 as it intersects Bethany Lane. MD 99 meets St. John's Lane, its original alignment, at the entrance to Mt. Hebron High School to the north of the road. MD 99 intersects Mt. Hebron Drive, which heads north toward the historic home Elmonte, before reaching its eastern terminus at the national northern terminus of US 29 (Columbia Pike). US 29 heads south as a freeway through an interchange with I-70 toward Columbia and Washington, D.C. The roadway continues east as county-maintained Rogers Avenue, which curves south toward the historic downtown of Ellicott City. Before Rogers Avenue crosses I-70, another section of Old Frederick Road splits to the east toward Baltimore County, the historic home Linnwood, and the historic Daniels Mill on the Patapsco River.

== History ==
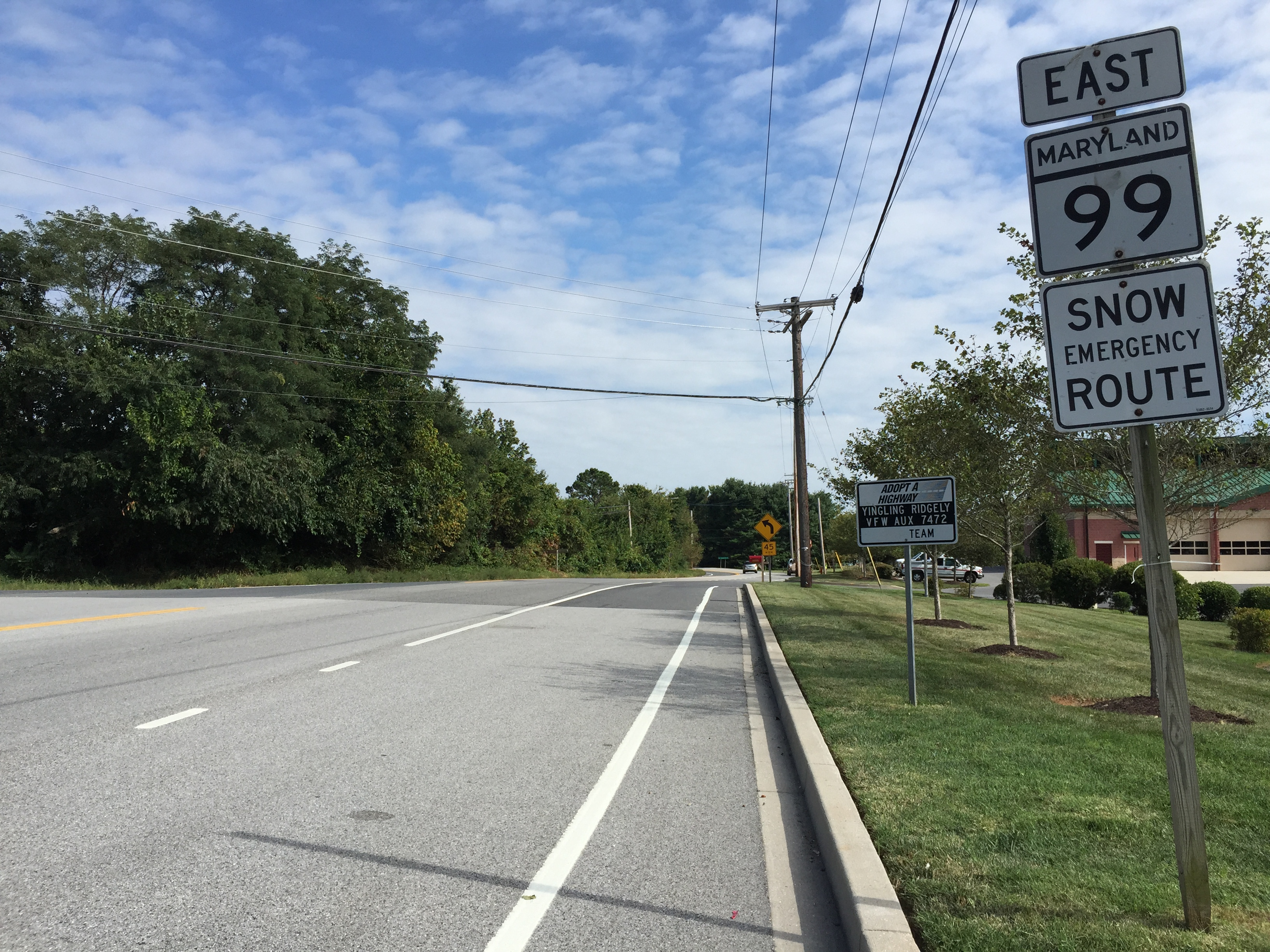
View east at the west end of MD 99 at MD 32 near West Friendship

Old Frederick Road was the original 18th-century highway between Baltimore and the Mount Airy area. The highway, which was mostly built along the height of land between the Patapsco and Patuxent watersheds, was replaced by the more southern Baltimore and Fredericktown Turnpike, which is now MD 144, around 1812. In the 20th century, the portion of Old Frederick Road east of West Friendship became part of two state highways. MD 99 was assigned to St. Johns Lane north of Frederick Road (formerly US 40 and MD 144) and Old Frederick Road from St. Johns Lane to Slacks Corner. The original MD 100, as opposed to the modern freeway that connects Ellicott City and Glen Burnie, was assigned to Old Frederick Road east of St. Johns Lane. In addition, MD 105 was assigned to Rogers Avenue, which would later become part of MD 99. The first section of what was to become MD 99 was constructed as a 9-foot (2.7 m) wide macadam road along St. Johns Lane from Frederick Road north to Old Frederick Road by 1915.

By 1923, Old Frederick Road from St. Johns Lane west to Marriottsville Road was paved in concrete and Old Frederick Road from a place called Wheelwrights Gate near the modern US 29 intersection to the Baltimore County line at the Patapsco River was reconstructed as a macadam road. Rogers Avenue was paved as a concrete road from Frederick Road near downtown Ellicott City north to near its present intersection with US 40 in 1923. Rogers Avenue was completed north to Old Frederick Road in 1924 and 1925. The next section of MD 99 to be built was a concrete road from MD 32 to Henryton Road between 1924 and 1926. This road was part of a highway to connect Slacks Corner with Henryton on the Patapsco River; Henryton Road later became part of MD 101. The gap between Henryton Road and Marriottsville Road was closed when a concrete road was constructed in 1929. Construction began shortly after 1930 on the gap between St. Johns Lane and Wheelwrights Gate; MD 100 was completed when that section of Old Frederick Road was paved in concrete by 1933.

In 1956, St. Johns Lane and Old Frederick Road east of Rogers Avenue were removed from the state highway system, resulting in the elimination of MD 100 and MD 105. MD 99 was extended east along Old Frederick Road and south along Rogers Avenue to Frederick Road. Rogers Avenue had been reconstructed and widened to 24 feet (7.3 m) starting in 1953, shortly before it became part of MD 99. I-70 north of Ellicott City and US 29 from US 40 to MD 99 were constructed between 1964 and 1967. MD 99 was relocated between US 29 and south of I-70 around 1966 when the state highway's bridge over I-70 was built; two sections of old alignment became segments of MD 985. MD 99's eastern terminus was rolled back from Frederick Road to US 40 in 1978 and from US 40 to its present terminus at US 29 in 1989.

== Junction list ==
The entire route is in Howard County.

Location	mi	km	Destinations	Notes
West Friendship	0.00	0.00	MD 32 (Sykesville Road) / Old Frederick Road west – Sykesville, Clarksville	Western terminus
Woodstock	2.87	4.62	Marriottsville Road to I-70 / US 40 – Marriottsville	
Woodstock	3.72	5.99	Woodstock Road north to MD 125 – Granite	
Ellicott City	7.57	12.18	US 29 south (Columbia Pike) / Rogers Avenue south – Columbia, Washington, Pensacola	Eastern terminus; northern terminus of US 29
1.000 mi = 1.609 km; 1.000 km = 0.621 mi
