= Maryland Route 854 =

Highway in Maryland

Maryland Route 854
- Old Washington Road

Route information
- Maintained by MDSHA
- Existed: 1961–present

MD 854A
- Length: 2.64 mi (4.25 km)
- South end: Bushey Road near Eldersburg
- North end: Road end near Morgan Run NEA

MD 854B
- Length: 3.93 mi (6.32 km)
- South end: Muller Road near Morgan Run NEA
- North end: MD 32 in Fenby

Location
- Country: United States
- State: Maryland
- Counties: Carroll

Highway system
- Maryland highway system; Interstate; US; State; Scenic Byways
← MD 853	→ MD 855

Maryland Route 854 (MD 854) is a collection of state highways in the U.S. state of Maryland. This pair of highways comprise the old alignment of MD 97 between MD 26 near Eldersburg and MD 32 in Fenby in Carroll County. MD 854A and MD 854B, which have lengths of 2.64 miles (4.25 km) and 3.93 miles (6.32 km), respectively, are separated by Morgan Run Natural Environment Area.

== Route description ==
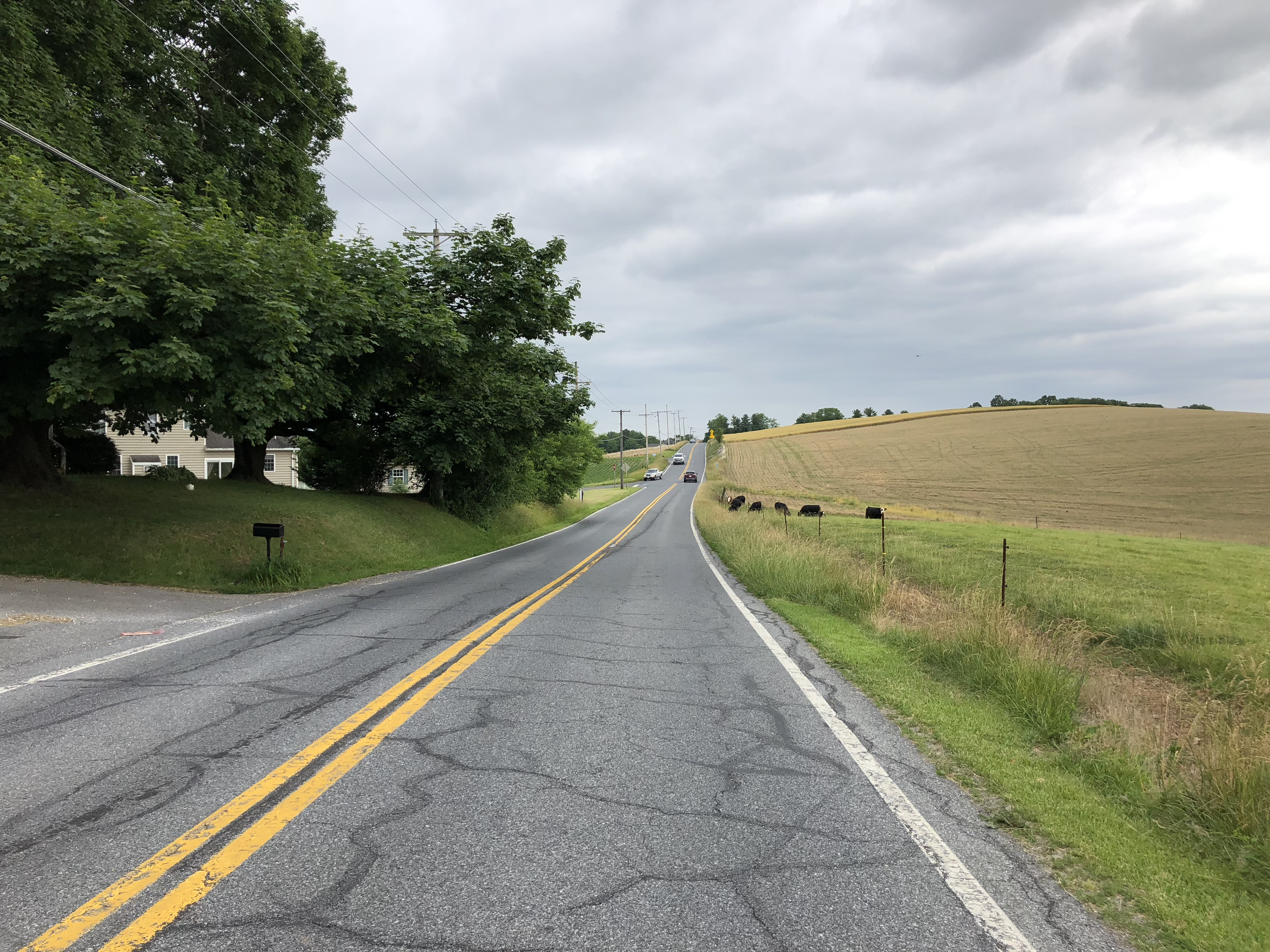
View south along MD 854B at MD 32 in Fenby

MD 854A begins at an intersection with Bushey Road just north of the county highway's intersection with MD 26 (Liberty Road) west of Eldersburg near the junction of MD 26 and MD 97 at Dorsey Crossroads. The state highway heads east as a two-lane undivided road parallel to MD 26, then curves north and parallels MD 97 as the two highways cross Little Morgan Run. North of Bear Branch Road, MD 854A reaches its northern terminus at the entrance to a private driveway just south of the Morgan Run Natural Environment Area property. South of Bear Branch Road, access to MD 97 (New Washington Road) is provided by Bartholow Road, which also leads to the main entrance of the natural environment area east of the state highway.

MD 854B begins at county-maintained Muller Road's eastern terminus adjacent to MD 97 just north of the Morgan Run Natural Environment Area property. The state highway heads north as a 15-foot (4.6 m) wide two-lane undivided road that crosses Morgan Run and follows one of the run's tributaries upstream out of Morgan Run's narrow valley. MD 854B widens to 18 feet (5.5 m) in width before intersecting Nicodemus Road, then heads north through farmland on top of a ridge. The state highway reaches its northern terminus at MD 32 (Washington Road) next to Carroll Community College.

== History ==
The first portion of Old Washington Road to be constructed as a state highway was from MD 32 in Fenby south to Salem Bottom Road in 1935. By 1939, this road, which became one of two disjoint sections of MD 570, was extended south to Nicodemus Road. All of Old Washington Road from MD 32 to MD 26, except the east–west portion parallel to MD 26, became a state highway in 1956 when MD 97 was extended north through Westminster from Howard County. Construction on a new alignment for MD 97 from MD 26 to Westminster, New Washington Road, began in 1957 from the Westminster Bypass south to Fenby; this new highway was completed in 1960. The new alignment of MD 97 was under construction at Morgan Run by 1959 and was completed to MD 26 (now MD 850H) in 1961. MD 854 was assigned to the old alignment of MD 97 except for the abandoned portion of the highway between Muller Road and north of Bear Branch Road. The number was also assigned to the newly constructed east–west portion of MD 854A built east from Bushey Road, which maintained the highway's connection to MD 26 after the original alignment was subsumed by the construction of MD 26's interchange with MD 97 in 1962.

== Junction list ==
=== MD 854A ===
The entire route is in Carroll County.

Location	mi	km	Destinations	Notes
Eldersburg	0.00	0.00	Bushey Road to MD 26	Southern terminus of MD 854A
	2.64	4.25	Dead end	Northern terminus of MD 854A
1.000 mi = 1.609 km; 1.000 km = 0.621 mi

=== MD 854B ===
The entire route is in Carroll County.

Location	mi	km	Destinations	Notes
	0.00	0.00	Muller Road west	Southern terminus of MD 854B
Fenby	3.93	6.32	MD 32 (Washington Road) – Westminster, Sykesville	Northern terminus of MD 854B
1.000 mi = 1.609 km; 1.000 km = 0.621 mi
