= Marriotts Ridge High School =

Public high school in Marriottsville, Maryland, U.S.

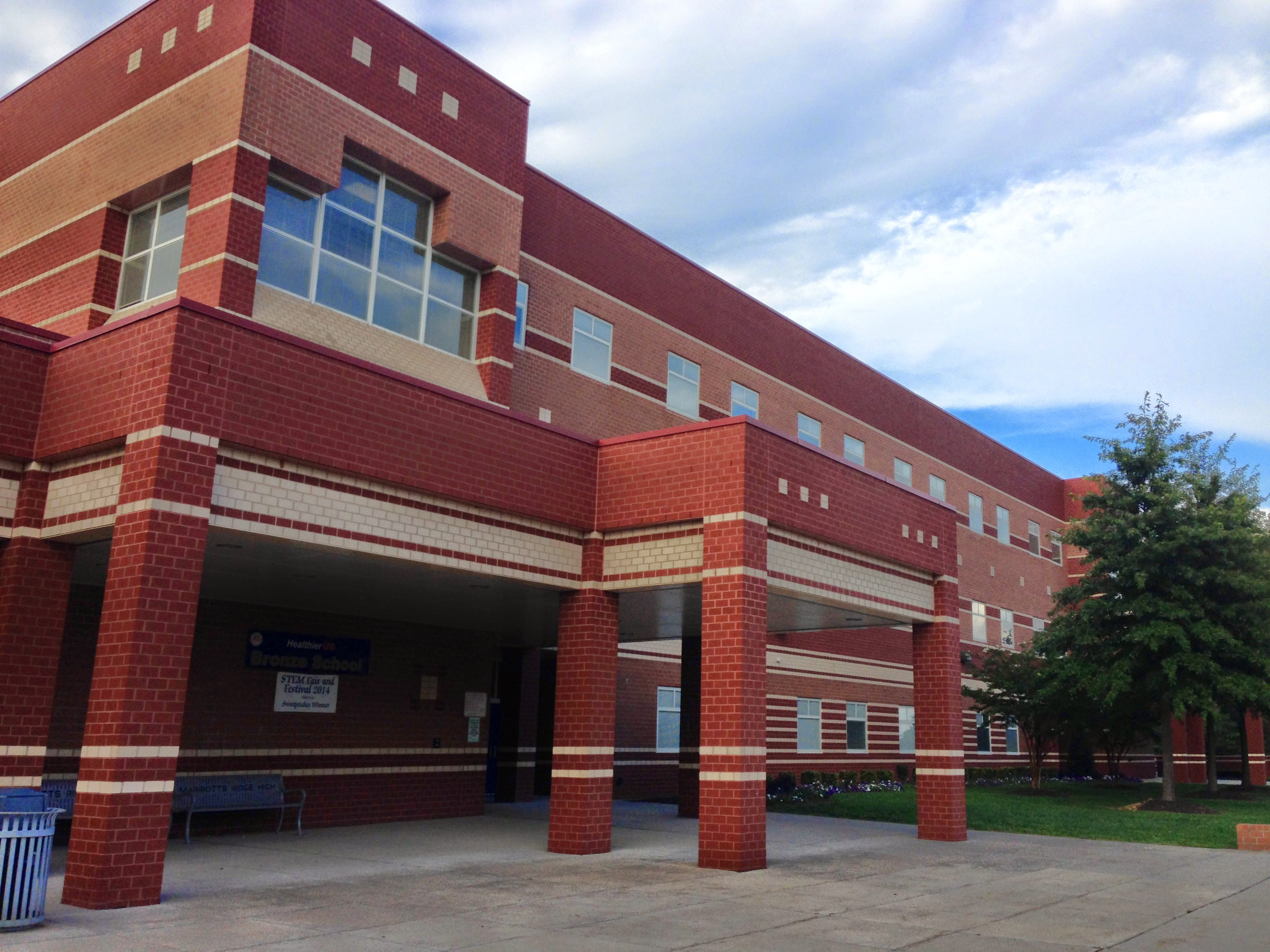

Location
- 12100 Woodford Drive; Marriottsville, MD, 21104; United States; 39.3218°N 76.9341°W

Information
- Type: Public High School
- Motto: "Exemplifying Excellence In All That We Do"
- Established: 2005
- Principal: Nicole Dennis
- Grades: 9–12
- Enrollment: 1,472
- Campus: Suburban/Rural
- Colors: Metallic Silver and Navy Blue
- Mascot: Mustang
- Website: mrhs.hcpss.org

Marriotts Ridge High School is a public high school located in Marriottsville, Maryland, United States. It is part of the Howard County Public School System. The school was named after the town of Marriottsville and the height of its location. The pre-opening name of Marriott's Ridge was later changed to Marriotts Ridge.

The school is located in northern Howard County on Maryland Route 99, just east of Maryland Route 32, and north of Interstate 70. It is approximately 15 miles west of Baltimore and 25 miles north of Washington, DC. The school was planned to be built on the grounds of the Alpha Ridge Landfill, but a 3–2 council vote in 2002 redirected the building to a site across from Mount View Middle School. Marriotts Ridge is a mirror image of both Long Reach High School and Reservoir High School. The school borders the districts for Glenelg High School, River Hill High School, Wilde Lake High School, Centennial High School, and Mount Hebron High School. In 2015, U.S. News & World Report ranked Marriotts Ridge as the No. 265th best high school nationwide and No. 7th statewide on its list of "America's Best High Schools".

== Principals ==
- Pat Saunderson 2005–2011
- Adrianne Kaufman 2011–2016
- Tammy Goldeisen 2016–2022
- John DiPaula 2022–2025
- Nicole Dennis 2025–present

== Athletics ==
Marriotts Ridge has won the following titles:

=== Baseball ===
- 2023 Baseball – Regional Champions

=== Boys' soccer ===
- 2013 Boys' Soccer – County Champions
- 2012 Boys' Soccer – County, Regional, State Champions, Undefeated (17–0)
- 2011 Boys' Soccer – Regional, State Champions
- 2010 Boys' Soccer – Regional, State Champions
- 2009 Boys' Soccer – County, District, Regional, State Champions
- 2008 Boys' Soccer – County, Regional Champions

=== Cheerleading ===
- Winter 2018-19 Cheerleading – County Champions
- Winter 2012–13 Cheerleading – County Champions
- Winter 2011–12 Cheerleading – County Champions
- Winter 2009–10 Cheerleading – County Champions

=== Football ===
- 2019 Boys' Football – County Champions

=== Girls' soccer ===
- 2010 Girls' Soccer – County Champions
- 2013 Girls' Soccer – Regional Champions
- 2022 Girls' Soccer - County Champions

=== Golf ===
- 2017 Golf - State Champions, Individual Girl, Individual Boy, and Team Champions (Triple Crown)
- 2016 Golf - State Champions, Boys' Team Undefeated
- 2015 Golf - State Champions, Boys' Team Undefeated
- 2014 Golf – State Champions, Boys' Team Undefeated
- 2013 Golf – State Champions, Undefeated
- 2012 Golf – State Champions
- 2011 Golf – Girls' County Champions
- 2010 Golf – District Champions

=== Lacrosse ===
- 2025 Girls' Lacrosse - State Champions
- 2025 Boys' Lacrosse - Regional Champions
- 2024 Girls Lacrosse - Regional Champions
- 2024 Boys' Lacrosse - Regional Champions
- 2022 Girls' Lacrosse- State Champions
- 2022 Girls' Lacrosse- Regional Champions
- 2021 Girls' Lacrosse – State Champions
- 2021 Boys' Lacrosse - Regional Champions
- 2018 Boys' Lacrosse - State Champions
- 2017 Boys' Lacrosse - County Champions
- 2014 Girls' Lacrosse – State Champions
- 2013 Girls' Lacrosse – State Champions
- 2013 Girls' Lacrosse – Regional Champions
- 2011 Girls' Lacrosse – State Champions (The MRHS Girls Varsity lacrosse team won the Maryland state title in 2011 by a score of 8–4 against Century High School.)
- 2010 Girls' Lacrosse – Regional Champions
- 2007 Boys Lacrosse- Regional Champions

=== Ice hockey ===
- 2019 Serio Cup Champions
- 2018 Serio Cup qualifiers - Lost to Glenelg High School
- 2017 Serio (Howard) Cup Champions
- 2017 MSHL State Finalist
- 2017 USA Hockey Nationals Qualifier – High School Division
- 2016 USA Hockey Nationals Qualifier – High School Division
- 2015 Howard Cup Champions
- 2011 Howard Cup Champions

=== Robotics ===
- 2012 State Alliance Champions
- 2012–2015 Regional Champions

=== Softball ===
- 2024 Softball- Regional Champions
- 2025 Softball- Regional Champions

=== Volleyball ===
- 2014 Volleyball – Regional Champions
- 2011 Volleyball – Regional Champions
- 2010 Volleyball – Regional Champions

=== Tennis ===
- 2022 Tennis - Regional Champions

== Club and activities ==
=== Computer Science Club ===
The MRHS Computer Science Club (founded 2019) teaches and assists students with computer science and programming, getting young students interested in the field of computer science. Members learn how to develop and build software projects and solve programming puzzles.

=== Journalism ===
MRHS publishes The Stallion, a student-led newspaper with monthly issues. Student journalists cover topics in local news, opinion, sports, features, and creative writing.

== Students ==
Front side of Marriotts Ridge.

Student Population
2020–2021	1,597
2012–2013	1,223
2011–2012	1,271
2010–2011	1,305
2008–2009	1,230
2007–2008	1,186
2006–2007	887
2005–2006	577

Demographics

Listed below is the data collected from the 2019–20 school year regarding the student body's ethnic breakdown.

Ethnicity	Percentage of Total Students
American Indian/Alaskan	<5.0%
Asian	37.2%
African American	9.2%
Hawaiian/Pacific Islander	<5.0%
Hispanic/Latino	<5.0%
White	45.9%
Two or more races	<5.0%

== See also ==
- Howard County Public Schools
