= Pfefferkorn House and Granary =

- Location within Maryland
- 39°17′41.1″N 76°59′20.4″W
- Nearest city: West Friendship, Maryland

History
- Built: 1844

Site notes
- Architectural style: Saltbox

Pfefferkorn House and Granary, or Lichendale is a historic slave plantation house located in West Friendship, Maryland near Glenelg, Maryland in Howard County, Maryland, United States.

The Lichendale farm is 450 acres combined from the 1837 Walter Brown, 1848 Gerald Hobbs and 1855 Thomas Jenkins farms.

The Lichendale mansion was built on the site in 1872 for the Shipley Family. 450 acres of land from "Hobbs Rest", "Poverty Discovered", and "Cumberland" were purchased by Laura Shipley, wife of the late Ethelbert E. Shipley from 1871-1872. The estate was inherited by her daughter Ethel and her husband Milfin Hood who sold the property after the deaths of their two daughters Betty and Carol in 1931. The estate was purchased by the Pfefferkorn family.

The Lichendale mansion burned in 1946. A wooden granary built between 1841 and 1868 was relocated in 1972 onto the Northern foundation and clad in grapevine seam brick. The Pfefferkorn house is a five bay wide, two story tall brick structure on a fieldstone foundation.

Outbuildings on the site include an 1873 Victorian playhouse, smokehouse, shed and four gable barn.

The house and estate are on a 51-acre remainder parcel. The farms of state Senator Robert H. Kittleman inherited by county executive Allan Kittleman, and former county executive Norman E. Moxley's son's estate "Popular Springs Garden Invasion" reside on subdivisions of the original farm, sheltered by the Pfefferkorn Natural Resource Area owned by Howard County.
