= Maryland Route 32 =

State highway in Maryland, US

Maryland Route 32
- Maryland Route 32 highlighted in red

Route information
- Maintained by MDSHA and U.S. Government
- Length: 51.79 mi (83.35 km)
- Existed: 1927–present

Major junctions
- East end: I-97 / MD 3 in Millersville
- MD 170 in Odenton; MD 175 in Odenton; MD 295 in Fort Meade; US 1 in Savage; I-95 in Savage; US 29 in Columbia; MD 108 in Clarksville; I-70 / US 40 in West Friendship; MD 26 in Eldersburg; MD 97 in Fenby
- North end: Washington Road in Westminster

Location
- Country: United States
- State: Maryland
- Counties: Anne Arundel, Howard, Carroll

Highway system
- Maryland highway system; Interstate; US; State; Scenic Byways
← MD 31	→ MD 33

Maryland Route 32 (MD 32) is a state highway in the U.S. state of Maryland. The road runs 51.79 miles (83.35 km) from Interstate 97 (I-97) and MD 3 in Millersville west and north to Washington Road in Westminster. The 30 mile four- to six-lane freeway portion of MD 32 is the Patuxent Freeway between I-97 and I-70 in West Friendship. The freeway passes through Odenton and Fort Meade, the site of Fort George G. Meade and the National Security Agency (NSA), in western Anne Arundel County and along the southern part of Columbia in Howard County. Via I-97, MD 32 connects those communities with U.S. Route 50 (US 50)/US 301 in Annapolis. MD 32 also intersects the four primary highways connecting Baltimore and Washington: the Baltimore–Washington Parkway, US 1, I-95, and US 29. MD 32's north–south section, Sykesville Road, connects West Friendship and Westminster by way of Sykesville and Eldersburg in southern Carroll County.

MD 32 was constructed as the original state road from West Friendship north to Westminster and from Westminster west to Taneytown in the early 1910s. The state highway was extended northwest to the Pennsylvania state line near Emmitsburg in the late 1910s. The portion of MD 32 from Glenelg to US 1 in Savage was built as MD 106 in the 1920s and early 1930s. MD 32 was extended south from West Friendship and assumed all of MD 106 in the mid-1940s. In the mid-1950s, the section of MD 32 from Westminster west to Emmitsburg was renumbered as an extension of MD 97. MD 32 would later be restored to its old route through Westminster and west toward Taneytown when MD 97, which is now MD 140 west of Westminster, was relocated in the early 1960s. MD 32 was truncated to Westminster in the late 1970s and rolled back to its present northern terminus at Washington Road in Westminster in 2001.

Along its present course, MD 32 bypassed Sykesville and was relocated from Clarksville to Glenelg in the early 1960s. The state highway was also extended east from Savage to Fort Meade in the late 1960s. A disjoint segment of MD 32 was constructed on a new alignment from MD 175 in Odenton to MD 178 in Crownsville in the early 1970s. The Patuxent Freeway was built from Fort Meade to Columbia in the mid-1980s and from Fort Meade to Millersville in the late 1980s and early 1990s. The freeway was completed from Columbia west to Clarksville in the mid-1990s, completed west through Fort George G. Meade to Crownsville in 2005, and completed north to West Friendship in 2022. Future plans call for MD 32 to be upgraded to a freeway from West Friendship to Eldersburg.

== Route description ==
MD 32 is maintained by the Maryland State Highway Administration (MDSHA) for its entire length except for the section between Samford Road and Canine Road in Fort Meade, which is maintained by the U.S. government. The highway is a part of the main National Highway System from its eastern terminus in Millersville to I-70/US 40 in West Friendship; the highway is also a National Highway System principal arterial from the Howard–Carroll county line to MD 91 at Gamber.

=== Millersville to Fort Meade ===
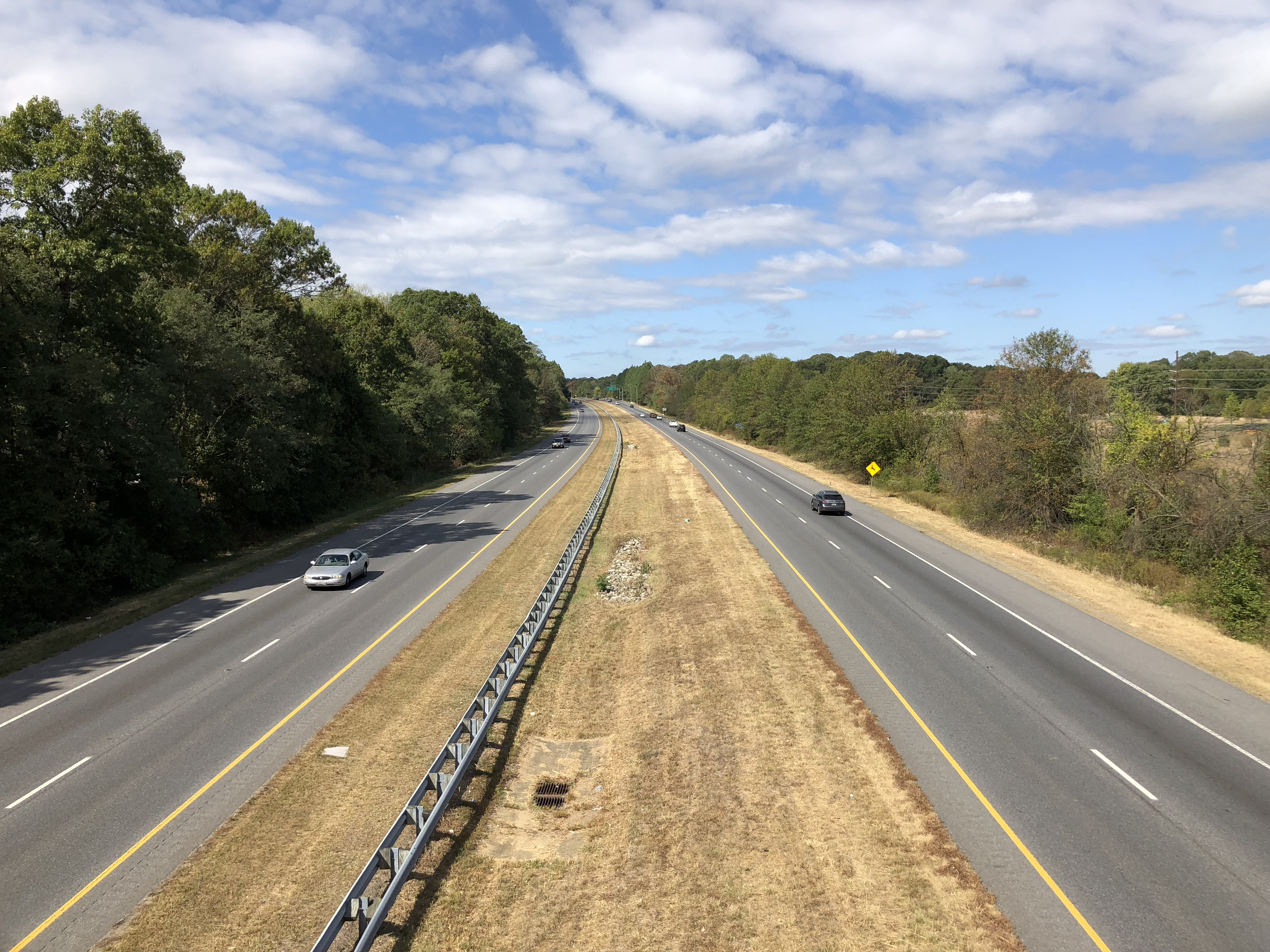
View west along MD 32 in Gambrills

MD 32 begins at a partial cloverleaf interchange with I-97 and MD 3 (Robert Crain Highway) in Millersville. MD 32 starts as a pair of two-lane flyover ramps that split west from northbound I-97 and join southbound I-97; the MD 32 ramps head northwest while I-97 curves to the northeast and settles into the wide median of the northern end of MD 3. After passing through its interchange with MD 3, MD 32 heads northwest as the Patuxent Freeway, a four-lane freeway that passes to the north of the community of Gambrills. The state highway's first interchange is with Sappington Station Road, a spur from the westbound ramps of MD 32 that is unsigned MD 32AA. The eastbound ramps connect with county-maintained Burns Crossing Road. MD 32 continues northwest along the northern edge of Odenton, where the freeway gradually curves to the southwest, has a diamond interchange with MD 170 (Telegraph Road) and a partial cloverleaf interchange with MD 175 (Annapolis Road), and crosses over Amtrak's Northeast Corridor railroad line and MARC's Penn Line between the interchanges.

MD 32 heads west from Odenton along the southern edge of Fort George G. Meade. The freeway has a dumbbell interchange with MD 198 (Laurel Fort Meade Road) just north of Tipton Airport. MD 32 curves northwest and has an interchange with Samford Road, which is one of two interchanges that provide access to the NSA. The median of MD 32 widens at the interchange as the eastbound ramps enter and exit on the left to a roundabout, from which Samford Road crosses the westbound lanes of MD 32. Immediately to the north of a trumpet interchange with Canine Road, which provides access to the NSA, the National Vigilance Park, and the National Cryptologic Museum, the freeway has a cloverleaf interchange with the Baltimore–Washington Parkway.

=== Fort Meade to Clarksville ===
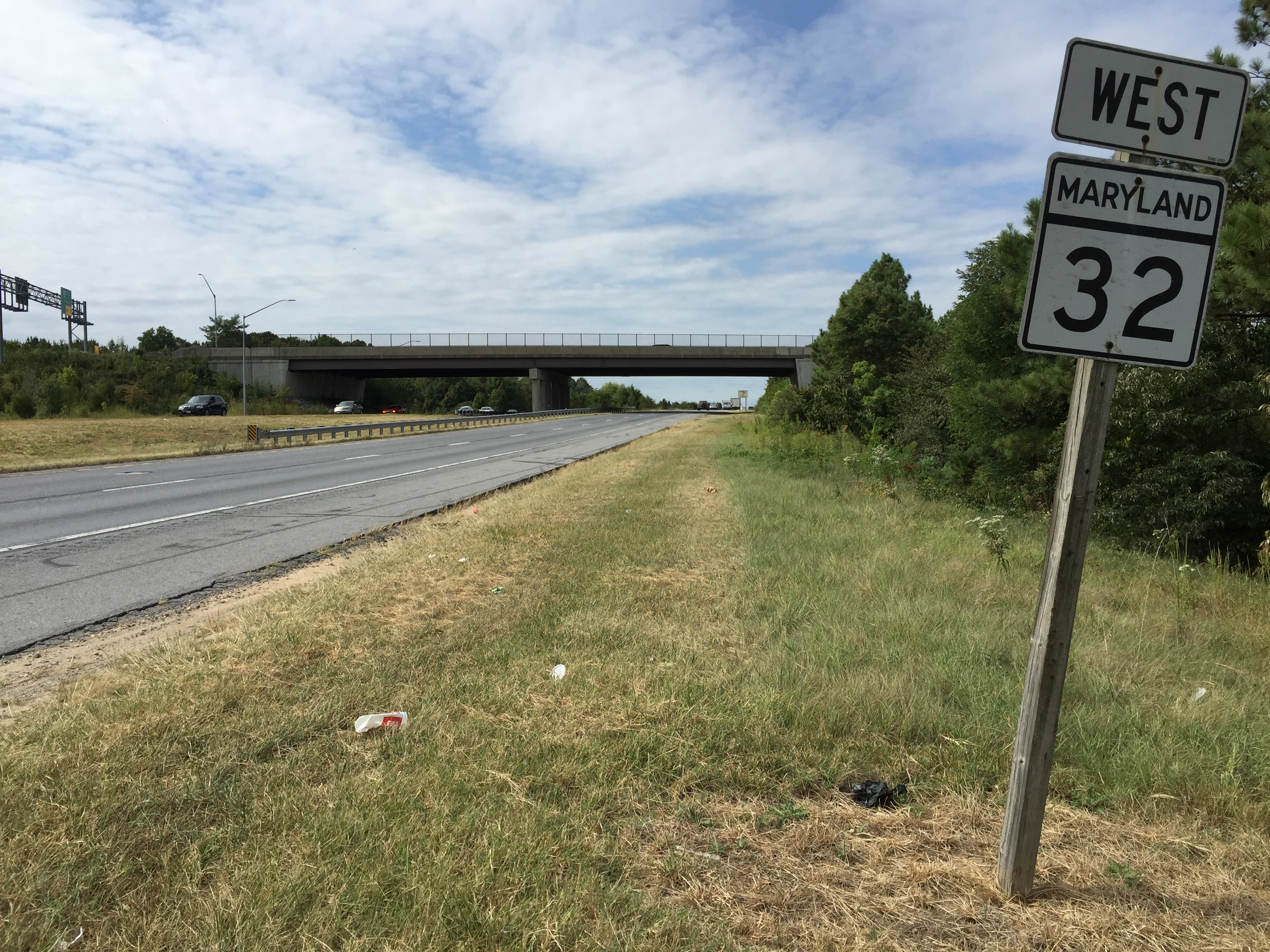
MD 32 westbound at Dorsey Run Road exit in Annapolis Junction

MD 32 traverses Dorsey Run into the industrial community of Annapolis Junction, where westbound MD 32 has an interchange with Guilford Road, which leads to National Business Parkway and the historic home Grassland. The state highway crosses over CSX's Capital Subdivision railroad line into Howard County and immediately has a partial cloverleaf interchange with Dorsey Run Road. Dorsey Run Road, which is unsigned MD 732R, provides access to the Savage station on MARC's Camden Line (which runs along the CSX line) and several industrial parks in Annapolis Junction. MD 32 continues northwest into Savage, where the highway has a cloverleaf interchange with US 1 (Washington Boulevard) that includes collector-distributor lanes in both directions. North of Savage, the freeway has a partial cloverleaf interchange with I-95 that has a pair of left-exiting ramps from westbound MD 32 to southbound I-95 and from eastbound MD 32 to northbound I-95; because of these left exits, I-95 is configured differently in that its southbound lanes pass under MD 32 and its northbound lanes pass over MD 32.

MD 32 continues west as a six-lane freeway through the expansive new town of Columbia. The freeway passes north and south of the villages of King's Contrivance and Owen Brown, respectively, where the highway has a partial cloverleaf interchange with Broken Land Parkway that provides access to two park and ride lots serving MTA Maryland commuter buses and a four-loop interchange with Eden Brook Drive and Shaker Drive. MD 32 crosses the Little Patuxent River between the two interchanges. Just south of Simpsonville, the state highway has a cloverleaf interchange with US 29 (Columbia Pike), which provides access to Columbia Town Center. The freeway reduces to four lanes and crosses the Middle Patuxent River just east of its diamond interchange with Sanner Road and Cedar Lane. MD 32 continues along the southern edge of the village of River Hill, where the highway has a half-interchange with Great Star Drive, which is unsigned MD 732V, allowing access to and from the east. The state highway continues northwest to Clarksville, where the highway has a diamond interchange with MD 108 (Clarksville Pike).

=== Clarksville to Westminster ===
West of its interchange with MD 108, MD 32's name changes to Sykesville Road and becomes a north–south highway, which continues as a partially controlled-access four-lane divided highway through a mix of farmland and large-plot residential subdivisions. The state highway is paralleled to the west by its old alignment, Ten Oaks Road. East of the community of Dayton, the state highway passes by MDSHA's Dayton shops. In Glenelg, MD 32 passes under Triadelphia Road and continues as a four-lane divided highway for its dumbbell interchange with Burntwoods Road, which also provides access to the northern end of Ten Oaks Road and Pfefferkorn Road. The state highway veers northeast and north toward West Friendship. MD 32 crosses the Middle Patuxent River and Terrapin Branch before its intersection with MD 144 (Frederick Road). The state highway has a diamond interchange with I-70/US 40 (Baltimore National Pike) before reducing to a four-lane undivided highway that passes east of a park and ride lot continues north to MD 32's intersection with MD 99 (Old Frederick Road).

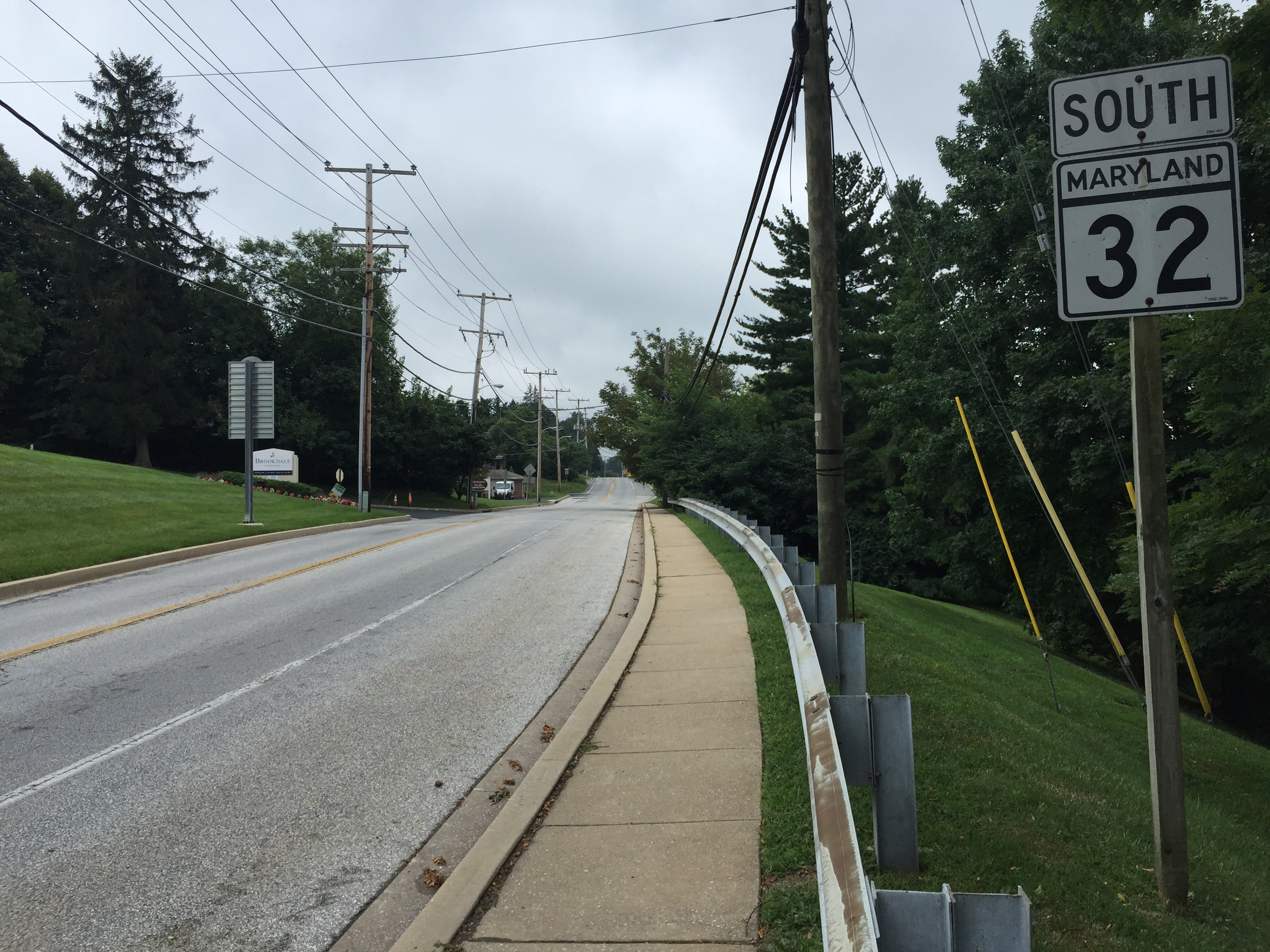
View south along MD 32 in Westminster

MD 32 continues north as a two-lane undivided road to Sykesville. Just south of the town, the state highway intersects West Friendship Road, the old alignment of MD 32 that is now MD 851. MD 32 veers northeast and crosses the Patapsco River and CSX's Old Main Line Subdivision railroad line into Carroll County; immediately to the east of MD 32's crossing is the highway's old aluminum bridge. The state highway passes to the west of Springfield Hospital Center, whose original buildings are preserved as the Warfield Complex, Hubner, and T Buildings. MD 32 temporarily expands to a four-lane divided highway at its intersection with Springfield Avenue, which is the northern end of MD 851, and continues north into the suburban community of Eldersburg. The state highway passes west of a park and ride lot before it expands to a four-lane divided highway at Piney Ridge Parkway and maintains that form through its intersection with MD 26 (Liberty Road). MD 32 continues through the suburban area as a four-lane undivided highway with two lanes northbound, one lane southbound, and a center turn lane. The state highway passes to the east of Liberty High School and reduces to two lanes north of Bennett Road.

MD 32 heads into a forested area and crosses the Morgan Run arm of Liberty Reservoir. The state highway passes through an S-curve before heading through the communities of Louisville and Gamber, where the highway meets the southern end of MD 91 (Gamber Road). MD 32 continues northwest through a mix of farmland and residential subdivisions toward Fenby, where the highway intersects MD 97 (New Washington Road). Just north of MD 97 adjacent to Carroll Community College, the state highway meets MD 97's old alignment, Old Washington Road, which is unsigned MD 854B. MD 32 continues north as Washington Road through a suburban area; the highway parallels MD 97 and passes to the west of the Carroll County Career and Technology Center and Westminster Senior High School east of the historic Friendship Valley Farm and Carroll County Almshouse and Farm, which is now the Carroll County Farm Museum. Just north of Bennett Avenue, MD 32 reaches its northern terminus at the southern city limit of Westminster. The roadway continues north as a municipal street to Main Street, which heads northwest through the Westminster Historic District.

== History ==
=== Original construction ===
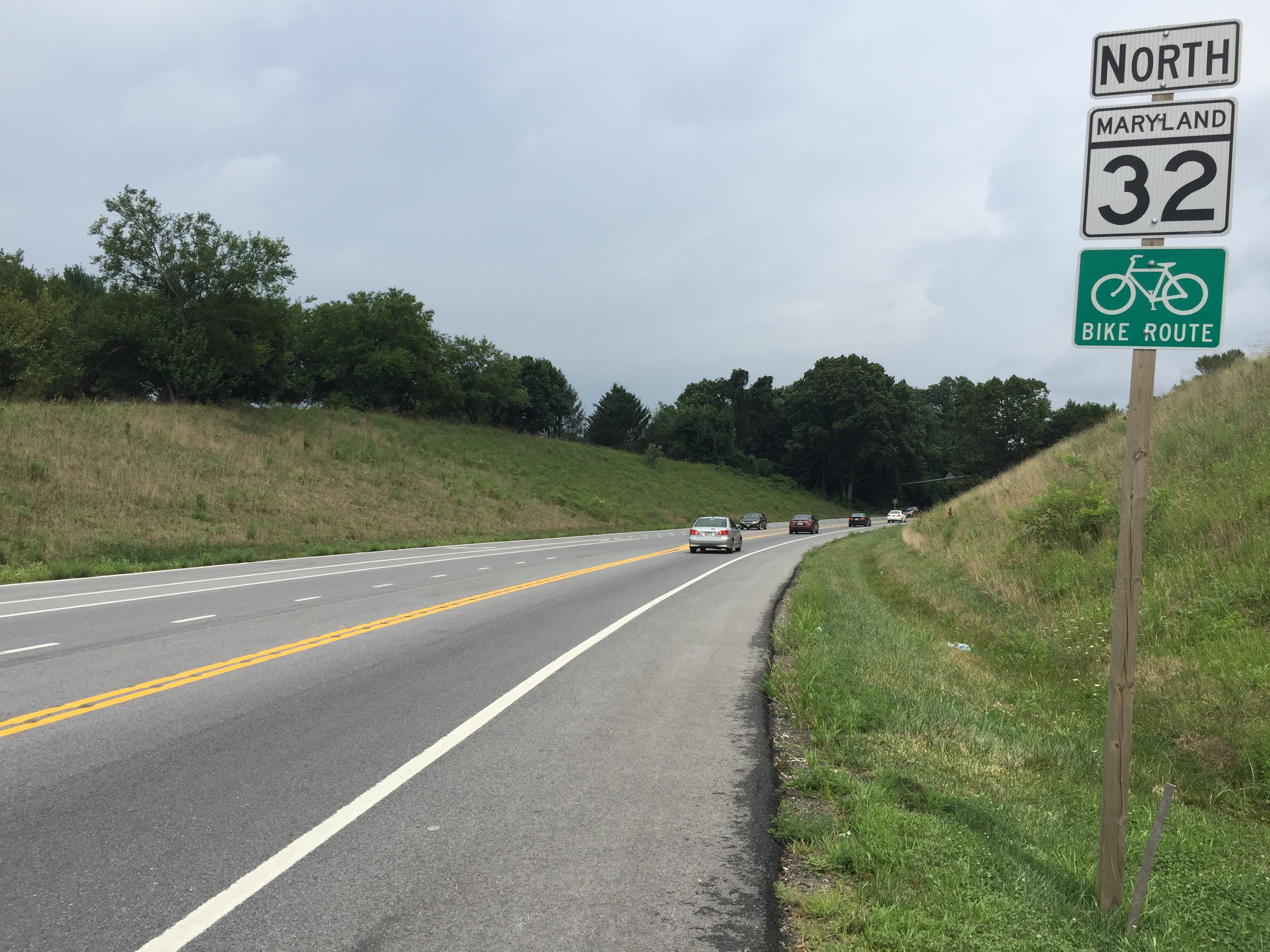
MD 32 northbound in Sykesville

When the Maryland State Roads Commission (MDSRC), the predecessor of MDSHA, laid out its original state road system in 1909, the commission included the roads from Westminster to Taneytown and from West Friendship to Westminster via Eldersburg. These highways already contained several stretches of improved highway; Main Street in Westminster and the highways for 1 mile (1.6 km) on either side of Gamber and for 2 miles (3.2 km) on either side of Sykesville were paved by 1910. In addition, the designated state roads included two turnpikes: the Westminster and Meadow Branch Turnpike operated from the western city limit of Westminster northwest to Fountain Valley on the road to Taneytown; and the Westminster and Fenby Turnpike operated from the southern city limit of Westminster to Fenby.

In 1911, the whole highway from West Friendship to Eldersburg was completed after the addition of 14-foot (4.3 m) wide macadam sections on either side of the existing paved road through Sykesville. That same year, construction began on the state road between Eldersburg and Fenby. The roads from Eldersburg to the existing paved road through Gamber and from Gamber to Fenby were completed with a 14-foot (4.3 m) wide macadam surface in 1912 and 1913, respectively. The road from Fountain Valley to Taneytown was paved as a 14-foot (4.3 m) wide concrete road from Fountain Valley through Frizzelburg in 1914 and from there to Taneytown in 1915. The former turnpikes still remained to be improved in 1915; those roads were resurfaced with macadam by 1919 to complete the original state road from West Friendship to Taneytown.

The next portion of what was to become MD 32 to be constructed was an extension of the Taneytown road northwest through Emmitsburg, which was planned by 1915. The sections from Taneytown to the Monocacy River and from the river 3 miles (4.8 km) west toward Emmitsburg were completed as a 14-foot (4.3 m) wide concrete road by 1919. The remaining 2 miles (3.2 km) to Emmitsburg were underway by 1920 and built as a 15-foot (4.6 m) wide concrete road by 1921. The highway was completed from Emmitsburg northwest to the Pennsylvania state line by 1923. When MDSRC started assigning numbers to its state roads in 1927, the highway from US 40 in West Friendship to the Pennsylvania state line northwest of Emmitsburg was designated MD 32.

Maryland Route 106
- Location: Glenelg–Savage
- Existed: 1927–1946

The portion of MD 32 from Glenelg to Savage was originally designated MD 106. This highway was paved in concrete from Dayton to Clarksville and from Clarksville to about 1 mile (1.6 km) west of the Middle Patuxent River near Simpsonville by 1923. That same year, a concrete road was added south from West Friendship to the Middle Patuxent River. The concrete road from Clarksville was extended to the Middle Patuxent River opposite Simpsonville in 1925. A macadam road was built from Atholton to Oakland Mills Road in Guilford between 1924 and 1926. Guilford was connected to US 1 near Savage with a gravel road by 1927. The gap in MD 106 through Simpsonville was filled with a concrete road in 1929 and 1930. MD 32 was extended southwest from the Middle Patuxent River to north of Glenelg around 1933. MD 106 was extended north from Dayton to Glenelg as a macadam road in 1934. The gap in the highway north of Glenelg was filled by 1946, by which time MD 32 had been extended south and east over the course of MD 106 to Savage.

=== Improvements ===
The first major improvement to the original course of MD 32 was the replacement of the highway's one-lane covered bridge over the Monocacy River with a wider triple-span concrete arch bridge in 1925. The highway was widened to 20 feet (6.1 m) from Westminster to just east of Taneytown by 1930 and from Taneytown to the Pennsylvania state line by 1934. MD 32 was reconstructed and widened again from Emmitsburg to the Pennsylvania state line in 1948 and through Taneytown in 1949. When US 40 was relocated as a four-lane divided highway through West Friendship in 1951, the new highway was placed on a bridge over MD 32 and a two-way ramp added to connect the grade-separated highways. MD 32 was relocated between Eldersburg and Louisville and a new bridge was constructed over Morgan Run in 1952 to replace the old road that would have been submerged by the filling of Liberty Reservoir.

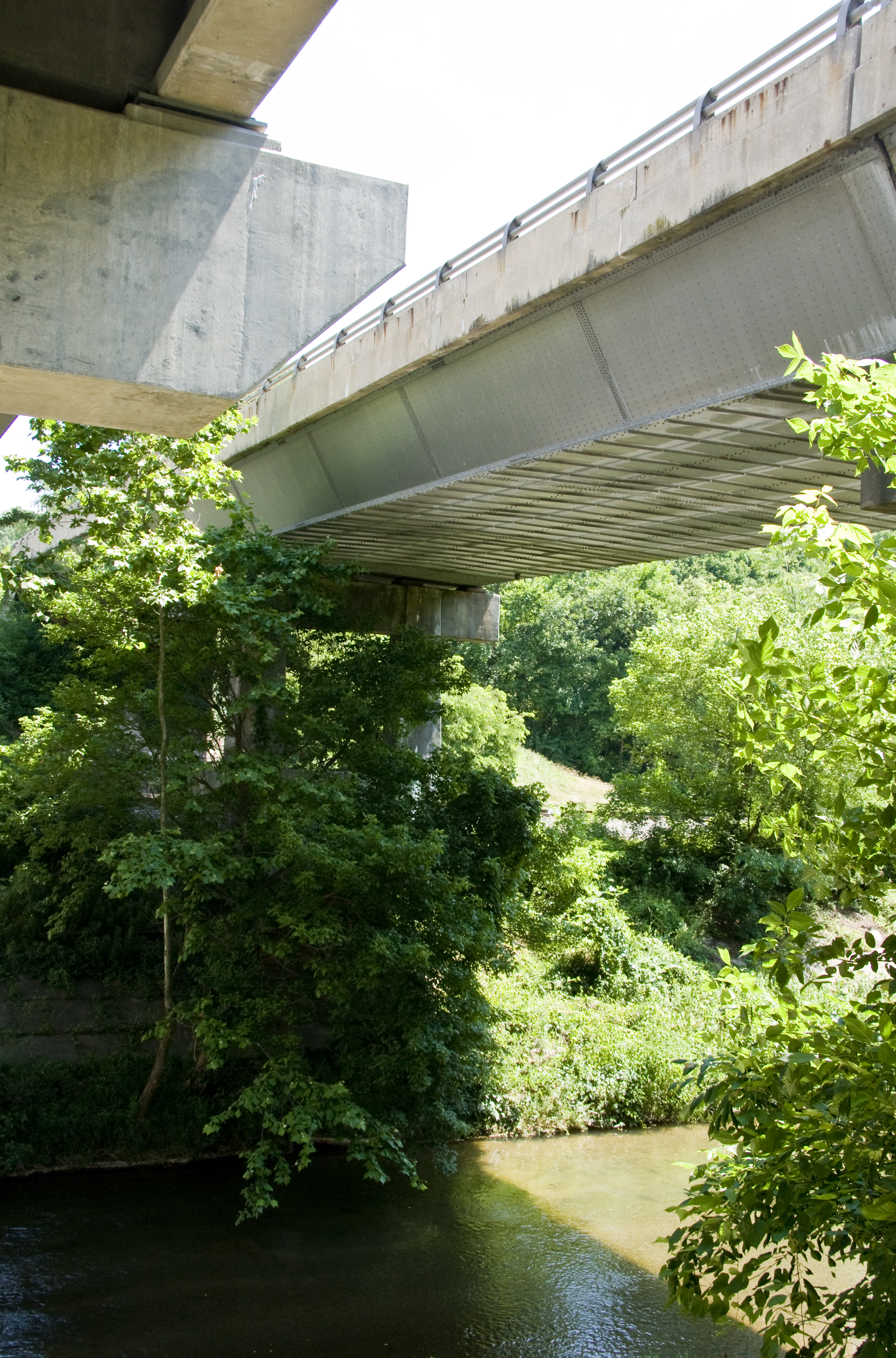
Riverside view of MD 32's former aluminum girder bridge in Sykesville

In 1956, the portion of MD 32 from Fenby north to Westminster and from Westminster west through Taneytown and Emmitsburg to the Pennsylvania state line was renumbered MD 97, which had been extended north from Howard County. The portion of MD 32 from MD 26 in Eldersburg to MD 97 in Fenby was transferred to county maintenance at the same time. In 1960, the road from Eldersburg to Fenby returned to the state highway system. In addition, MD 97 was moved to a new alignment, New Washington Road; the new alignment ran from Fenby to US 140, which then connected Baltimore with Gettysburg, in Westminster. MD 97 then followed the Westminster Bypass to the northwest side of the city. Subsequently, MD 32 was extended along its original alignment through Westminster to MD 97 near Western Maryland College (now McDaniel College). MD 32 would later be assigned to its original alignment from Fountain Valley to east of Taneytown when MD 97's new alignment between the two communities was completed in 1965. The disjoint segment of MD 32 was renumbered MD 832 in 1978. In 1979, US 140 was decommissioned; the highways from Baltimore to Westminster and from Westminster through Emmitsburg became MD 140. MD 97 was moved to its present course from Westminster toward Gettysburg. MD 32's northern terminus was rolled back to MD 31 around 1987. The state highway was truncated at the Westminster city limit in 2001 following the reconstruction of Main Street and its transfer to city maintenance.

MD 32 was reconstructed and widened from Sykesville to Eldersburg starting in 1957 and from West Friendship to just south of Sykesville in 1958. The state highway's bypass of Sykesville was completed in 1963; the old road through the center of Sykesville became MD 851. MD 32's new bridge across the Patapsco River was the longest of only three aluminum triangular box beam girder bridges constructed in the United States. The girder system was topped by a concrete slab deck and underlain with standard concrete abutments and piers and steel bearing pads on which the aluminum girders rested. These bridges, which were designed by Fairchild Engine and Airplane Company, were constructed of aluminum due to that metal's light weight but similar strength compared to steel. Many experimental aluminum bridges were built due to a severe shortage of steel in the early 1960s. Aluminum bridges are rarely constructed because they are much more expensive than steel and concrete bridges.

In the 1990s, MDSHA discovered the bridge's rarity while conducting a bridge inventory. The inventory also found premature deterioration of its supports due to galvanic corrosion involving the steel bearing pads and aluminum girder structure. Because repairing the structure would have been extremely difficult, MDSHA decided to build a replacement bridge immediately to the west of the aluminum bridge; the new bridge opened in 2004 along with a slight relocation in MD 32 on both sides of the bridge. The aluminum bridge was added to the state's Historic Bridge Registry and was left in place as a historic landmark after MD 32's new bridge over the Patapsco River opened. The bridge was listed on the National Register of Historic Places in 2024 as the Sykesville Bypass Bridge.

=== Patuxent Freeway ===
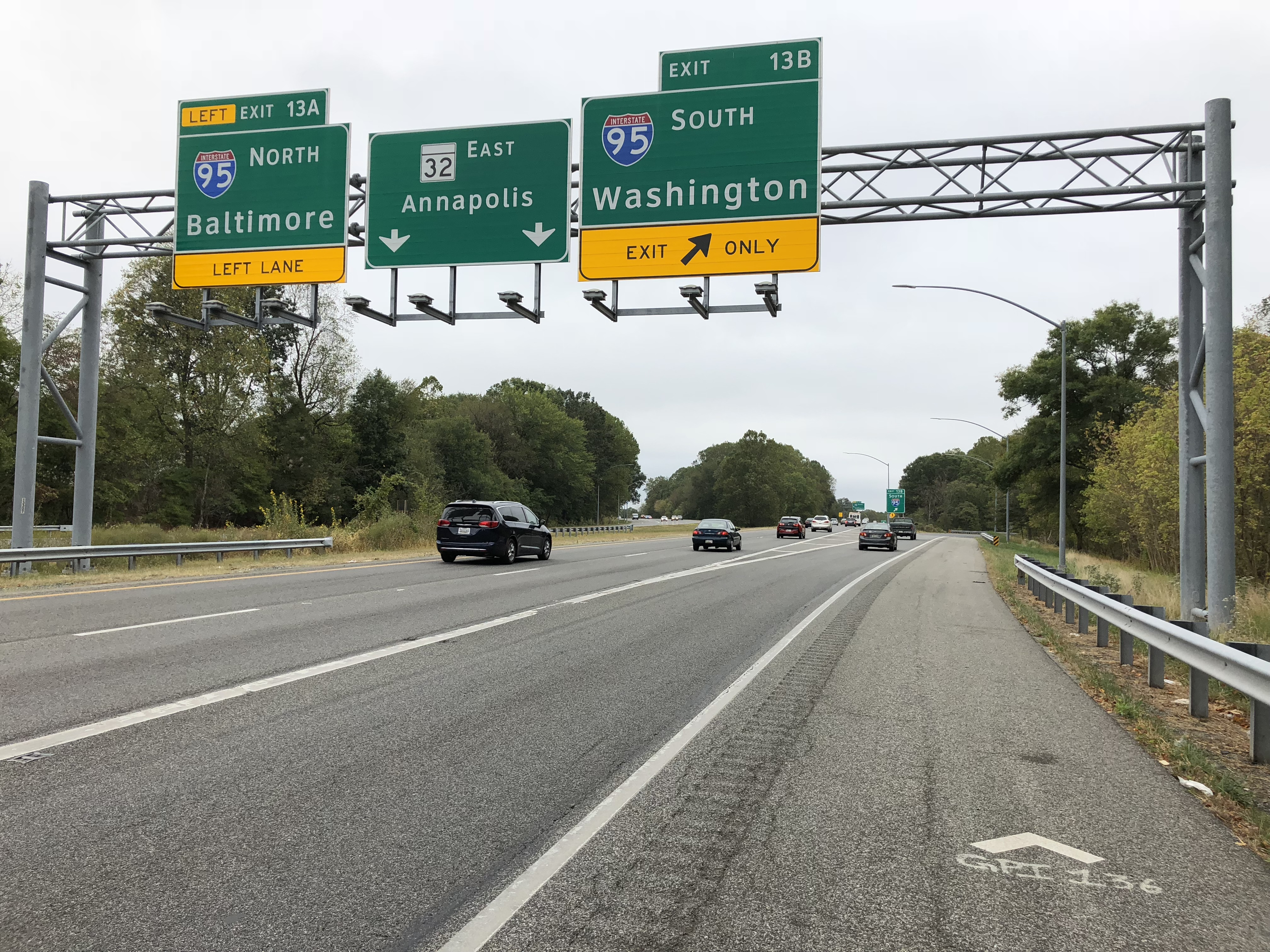
MD 32 eastbound at the I-95 interchange in Savage

In 1956, MD 32 was extended east on Guilford Road from US 1 to the Howard – Anne Arundel county line at Annapolis Junction. The state highway was relocated to its present alignment from Glenelg to Clarksville between 1961 and 1964, bypassing Ten Oaks Road. MD 32 was expanded to a four-lane divided highway in West Friendship when its interchange with I-70 was reconstructed as a diamond interchange in 1973. MD 32 was extended east into Anne Arundel County in 1969 when the designation was extended to just east of the Baltimore–Washington Parkway on the edge of Fort George G. Meade. The first two sections of what would become the Patuxent Freeway opened in 1972. A short section of divided highway opened from just west of Oakland Mills Road in Guilford to a turnaround just west of Vollmerhausen Road that included MD 32's modern interchange with I-95. The other section was a two-lane road from MD 175 in Odenton northeast along Sappington Station Road and then east along the current alignments of MD 32 and I-97 to MD 178 just east of I-97 Exit 5 in Crownsville. The eastern section, which from 1972 to 1977 was one of the three disjoint sections of mainline MD 32 between Crownsville and Taneytown, included an interchange with MD 3 in Millersville. As of 1978, MD 32's interchange with the Baltimore–Washington Parkway was a partial cloverleaf interchange with four ramps on the north side of MD 32—due to the state highway closely paralleling the Baltimore and Ohio Railroad's spur to the military base—and a fifth ramp from the northbound Parkway to eastbound MD 32. The MD 3 interchange included the ramps to and from MD 32 in the direction of Fort Meade plus a ramp from westbound MD 32 to northbound MD 3. All other movements were made via MD 178 or Millersville Road.

Construction on the Patuxent Freeway resumed in 1981 in Howard County. The freeway opened from Dorsey Run Road to US 29 in 1985. The freeway was extended across the Middle Patuxent River to tie into the existing two-lane road near Cedar Lane by 1987. The new highway was extended east from Dorsey Run Road to just west of the Baltimore–Washington Parkway as a four-lane divided highway that same year. Sections of MD 32's old alignment became part of MD 732. The highway from Dorsey Run Road to the Parkway was upgraded to a freeway with the completion of interchanges at Dorsey Run Road and a ramp to Guilford Road in 1991. The interchange between MD 32 and the Baltimore–Washington Parkway was upgraded to a full cloverleaf around 1993. The final section of the Patuxent Freeway in Howard County opened from west of US 29 to west of MD 108 in 1996.

I-97 was under construction from Annapolis to Millersville by 1987. When that section of the Interstate was completed in 1989, the highway took over the portion of MD 32 from MD 178 to MD 3. The easternmost portion of MD 32 became I-97's Exit 5 interchange ramps; the MD 3 interchange was upgraded to provide full access. Also in 1989, construction began on MD 32 between the Baltimore–Washington Parkway and I-97. MD 32 was extended as a four-lane divided highway along the existing road from the parkway east to MD 198 and as a two-lane road on a new alignment from MD 198 to MD 175. The sections of MD 32 from MD 198 to MD 175 west of Odenton and from Burns Crossing Road to I-97 were under construction to expand them to a freeway; the freeway segment from MD 175 to Burns Crossing Road on the north side of Odenton was also under construction. The freeway between MD 198 and MD 175 was complete by 1991. The remainder of the Patuxent Freeway from Fort Meade to Millersville was completed in 1993.

In 2000, construction began on the gap in the Patuxent Freeway through Fort George G. Meade. MD 32's interchanges with MD 198 and Samford Road were completed in 2002. The MD 198 project involved extending the latter highway east along the northern edge of Tipton Airport so MD 198 could tie into the fort's Mapes Road entrance; the Mapes Road intersection east of MD 198 was also eliminated by the construction. The Patuxent Freeway through Fort Meade was finished when MD 32's interchange with Canine Road was completed in 2005.

=== Sykesville Road upgrade ===
MDSHA had long-term plans to upgrade MD 32 to a four-lane freeway from MD 108 to I-70. The first project, which involved constructing a modified dumbbell interchange to connect MD 32 with Burntwoods Road, Ten Oaks Road, Pfefferkorn Road, and Ivory Road in Glenelg, was completed in 2008. The next project involved the construction of a diamond interchange at Linden Church Road, which, before the dumbbell interchange was completed in the fall of 2013, met MD 32 at a pair of signalized, three-way directional crossover intersections between Glenelg and Clarksville. Between 2019 and 2022, MDSHA upgraded the remainder of MD 32 between MD 108 to MD 144 to a four-lane divided highway. At the MDSHA's Dayton Shop south of Glenelg, a signalized "Maryland-T" intersection was constructed. Between Glenelg and West Friendship, MD 32 was upgraded to a superstreet; its intersection with Rosemary Lane was reconstructed to a J-turn, prohibiting left turns onto MD 32 southbound, and access to southbound MD 32 from Rosemary Lane, Stiles Way, and Parliament Place is now provided via a U-turn north of the Middle Patuxent River. The intersection with MD 32 and Fox Chase Road was removed, and a frontage road (Terrapin Run) which provides access to Nixons Farm as well as other residences was constructed. At MD 32's interchange with I-70, the ramp from northbound MD 32 to westbound I-70 was widened from one lane to two lanes for additional capacity.

== Junction list ==
MD 32 is signed east–west from I-97 in Millersville to MD 108 in Clarksville and north–south from MD 108 to Westminster.

County	Location	mi	km	Exit	Destinations	Notes
Anne Arundel	Millersville	0.00	0.00		I-97 south – Annapolis	Eastern terminus; I-97 Exit 7; westbound exit from and eastbound entrance to I-97
Anne Arundel	Millersville	0.68	1.09		MD 3 south (Robert Crain Highway) to I-97 north – Gambrills, Bowie, Baltimore	Split into two exits eastbound for MD 3 (south) and I-97 (north); westbound direction has single exit for MD 3; northern terminus of MD 3
Anne Arundel	Odenton	2.35	3.78	3	Burns Crossing Road – Gambrills, Odenton	Ramp from westbound MD 32 and crossroad is unsigned MD 32AA (Sappington Station Road)
Anne Arundel	Odenton	4.54	7.31	5	MD 170 (Telegraph Road) – Odenton, Severn	
Anne Arundel	Odenton	6.08	9.78	6	MD 175 (Annapolis Road) – Odenton, Fort Meade	Access to Odenton station
Anne Arundel	Fort Meade	8.39	13.50	8	MD 198 (Laurel Fort Meade Road) – Laurel, Fort Meade	
Anne Arundel	Fort Meade	9.21	14.82	9	Samford Road – NSA	Restricted Access - NSA employees only
Anne Arundel	Fort Meade	10.07	16.21	10A	Canine Road – NSA	Restricted Access - NSA official business only
Anne Arundel	Fort Meade	10.41	16.75	10B–C	Baltimore–Washington Parkway (MD 295) – Baltimore, Washington	Split into exits 10B (north) and 10C (south)
Anne Arundel	Annapolis Junction	11.03	17.75	10D	Guilford Road to National Business Parkway	Westbound exit and entrance
Howard	Annapolis Junction	11.78	18.96	11	Dorsey Run Road	Unsigned MD 732R, access to Savage station
Howard	Savage	12.96	20.86	12	US 1 (Washington Boulevard) – Laurel, Elkridge	Split into exits 12A (north) and 12B (south); both directions have collector-distributor lanes
Howard	Savage	14.51	23.35	13	I-95 – Baltimore, Washington	Split into exits 13A (north) and 13B (south); I-95 Exit 38
Howard	Columbia	16.33	26.28	14	Broken Land Parkway	Split into exits 14A (north) and 14B (south) eastbound
Howard	Columbia	16.88	27.17	15	Shaker Drive / Eden Brook Drive	
Howard	Columbia	17.76	28.58	16	US 29 (Columbia Pike) – Columbia Town Center, Washington	Split into exits 16A (north) and 16B (south); US 29 Exit 16
Howard	Columbia	18.95	30.50	17	Sanner Road / Cedar Lane	
Howard	Columbia	20.70	33.31	19	Great Star Drive	Unsigned MD 732V; westbound exit and eastbound entrance
Howard	Clarksville	21.91	35.26	20	MD 108 (Clarksville Pike) – Clarksville	Sign change from east-west to north-south
Howard	Dayton	23.03	37.06	22	Linden Church Road	
Howard	Glenelg	27.38	44.06	25	Burntwoods Road / Ten Oaks Road	Dumbbell interchange; north end of freeway
Howard	West Friendship	30.54	49.15		MD 144 (Frederick Road) – Cooksville, Ellicott City	Officially MD 144A
Howard	West Friendship	30.98	49.86		I-70 / US 40 (Baltimore National Pike) – Baltimore, Frederick	I-70 Exit 80
Howard	West Friendship	31.80	51.18		MD 99 east (Old Frederick Road) to US 29 south – Woodstock	Western terminus of MD 99
Howard	Sykesville	34.78	55.97		MD 851 north (West Friendship Road) – Sykesville	Southern terminus of MD 851; to Main Street
Carroll	Sykesville	36.19	58.24		Springfield Avenue (MD 851 south) – Downtown Sykesville	Northern terminus of MD 851
Carroll	Eldersburg	38.43	61.85		MD 26 (Liberty Road) – Randallstown, Libertytown	
Carroll	Gamber	43.43	69.89		MD 91 north (Gamber Road) – Finksburg	Southern terminus of MD 91
Carroll	Fenby	48.91	78.71		MD 97 (New Washington Road) – Westminster, Cooksville	
Carroll	Fenby	49.30	79.34		Old Washington Road south	Unsigned MD 854B
Carroll	Westminster	51.79	83.35		Washington Road north	Westminster city limit; northern terminus
1.000 mi = 1.609 km; 1.000 km = 0.621 mi: Incomplete access

== Auxiliary routes ==
MD 32 has three existing auxiliary routes:

- MD 32AA is the designation for Sappington Station Road, which runs 1.00 mile (1.61 km) from westbound MD 32 west to MD 175 in Odenton. The state highway begins at the westbound MD 32 exit ramp for Exit 3. MD 32AA merges with the entrance ramp to westbound MD 32 and intersects the northern section of Burns Crossing Road before crossing over MD 32. The state highway intersects the southern section of Burns Crossing Road and heads southwest to its terminus at a roundabout with MD 175 (Annapolis Road), Odenton Road, and Higgins Drive.
- MD 32AH is the designation for Lodigiani Avenue, a 0.04-mile (0.064 km) spur east from Gambrills Road just south of Gambrills Road's overpass of MD 32 in Gambrills.
- MD 32B is the designation for the unnamed 0.02-mile (0.032 km) connector between MD 32 and MD 851H, which is a spur of old alignment of MD 32 north of West Friendship.
