= Maryland Route 850 =

State highway in Maryland, United States

Maryland Route 850
- Old Liberty Road

Route information
- Maintained by MDSHA
- Existed: 1958–present

Location
- Country: United States
- State: Maryland
- Counties: Carroll, Frederick

Highway system
- Maryland highway system; Interstate; US; State; Scenic Byways
← MD 849	→ MD 851

Maryland Route 850 (MD 850) is a collection of state highways in the U.S. state of Maryland. These seven highways are sections of old alignments of MD 26, most of which are named Old Liberty Road, in the communities of Taylorsville, Winfield, and Eldersburg in southern Carroll County. There are also at least three former sections of MD 850: two are in Eldersburg and one is in Frederick. MD 26 was constructed west of Eldersburg between the early 1920s and early 1930s. That highway was extensively relocated and reconstructed across southern Carroll County in the late 1950s and early 1960s; many of the segments of Old Liberty Road became portions of MD 850.

== Route descriptions ==
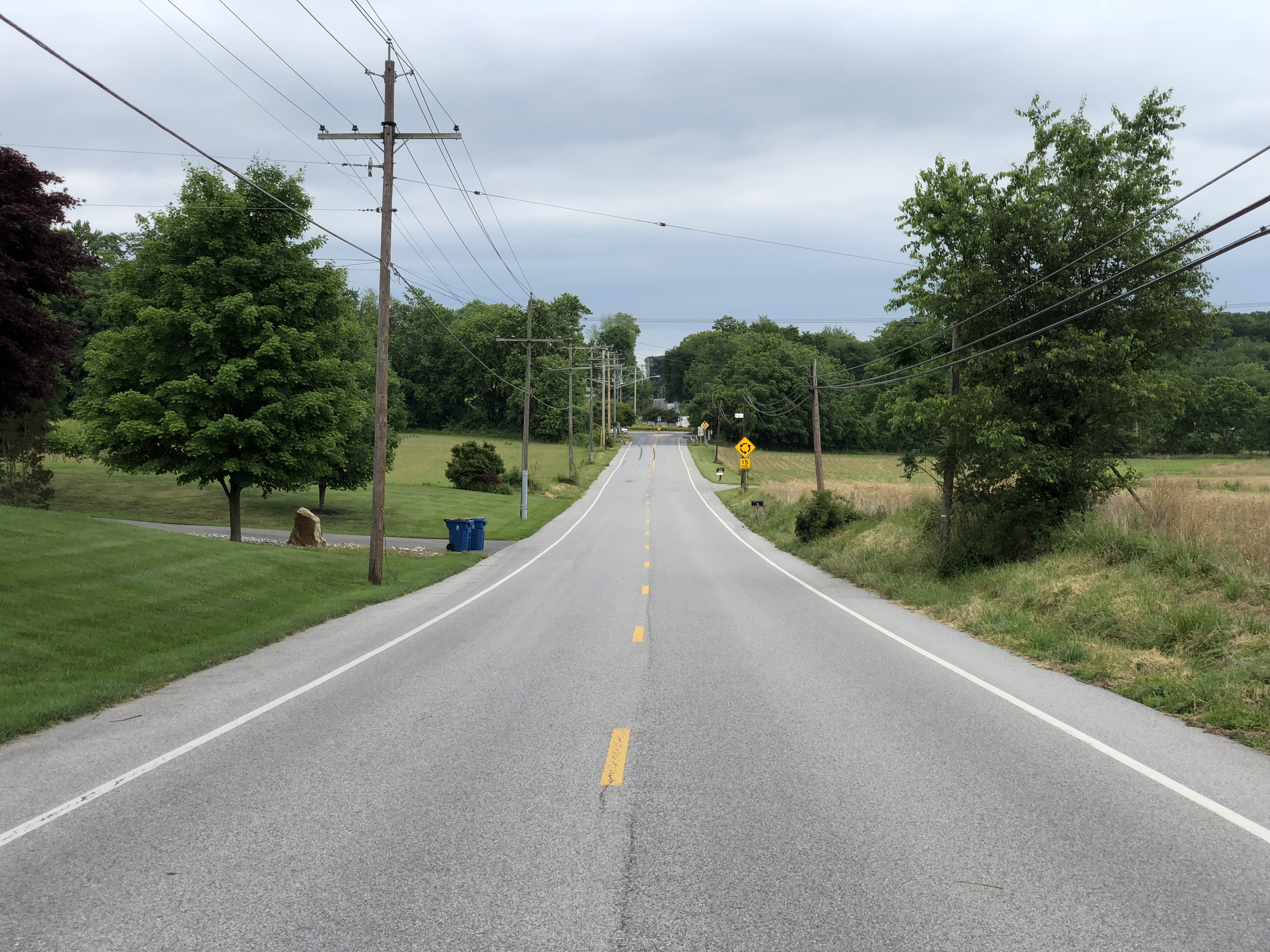
View east along MD 850H in Dorsey Crossroads

The two longest segments of MD 850 are MD 850H and MD 850J, which have lengths of 1.75 miles (2.82 km) and 1.24 miles (2.00 km), respectively. MD 850H runs along the eastbound side of MD 26 from a dead end east of Winfield east to MD 26 in Eldersburg. The highway heads east as a two-lane undivided road and immediately intersects county-maintained Freter Road, which provides access to MD 26. The highway gradually veers away from the main highway. In the hamlet of Dorsey Crossroads, MD 850H meets MD 97 (Old Washington Road) at a roundabout a short distance south of MD 97's interchange with MD 26. A park and ride lot is located northwest of this roundabout. MD 850H continues east and gradually approaches the parallel MD 26. The state highway curves north and ends at MD 26's intersection with Klee Mill Road. MD 850J runs between two dead ends on the westbound side of MD 26 in Winfield. The highway begins at a dead end a short distance west of Salem Bottom Road. The state highway heads east as a two-lane undivided road and intersects county-maintained Salem Bottom Road, which provides access to MD 26. MD 850J starts to closely parallel MD 26; the two highways are connected by spurs on either side of South Carroll High School, east of which the state highway reaches its eastern terminus at a dead end.

There are five other extant segments of MD 850. From west to east:

- MD 850D is the designation for a pair of disjoint sections of Old Liberty Road on the eastbound side of MD 26 at the Frederick–Carroll county line near Taylorsville. The western segment runs 0.11 miles (0.18 km) from a dead end east to Buffalo Road, which follows the county boundary. The eastern segment runs 0.10 miles (0.16 km) from Roop Road east to a dead end.
- MD 850C is the designation for a 0.77-mile (1.24 km) section of Old Liberty Road between two dead ends on the eastbound side of MD 26 between MD 850D and MD 27 in Taylorsville. The state highway is connected to MD 26 by county-maintained Franklinville Road.
- MD 850E is the designation for a 0.78-mile (1.26 km) section of Old Liberty Road that follows the eastbound side of MD 26 from a dead end in Taylorsville east to an intersection with MD 26 just west of MD 850J's west end in Winfield.
- MD 850I is the designation for a 0.02-mile (0.032 km) section of Old Liberty Road on the westbound side of MD 26 between MD 850J and MD 850H east of Winfield. MD 850I is connected to MD 26 by MD 26A.
- MD 850K runs 0.05 miles (0.080 km) from MD 850H in Eldersburg, just south of the latter route's eastern terminus at MD 26, east to a dead end.

== History ==
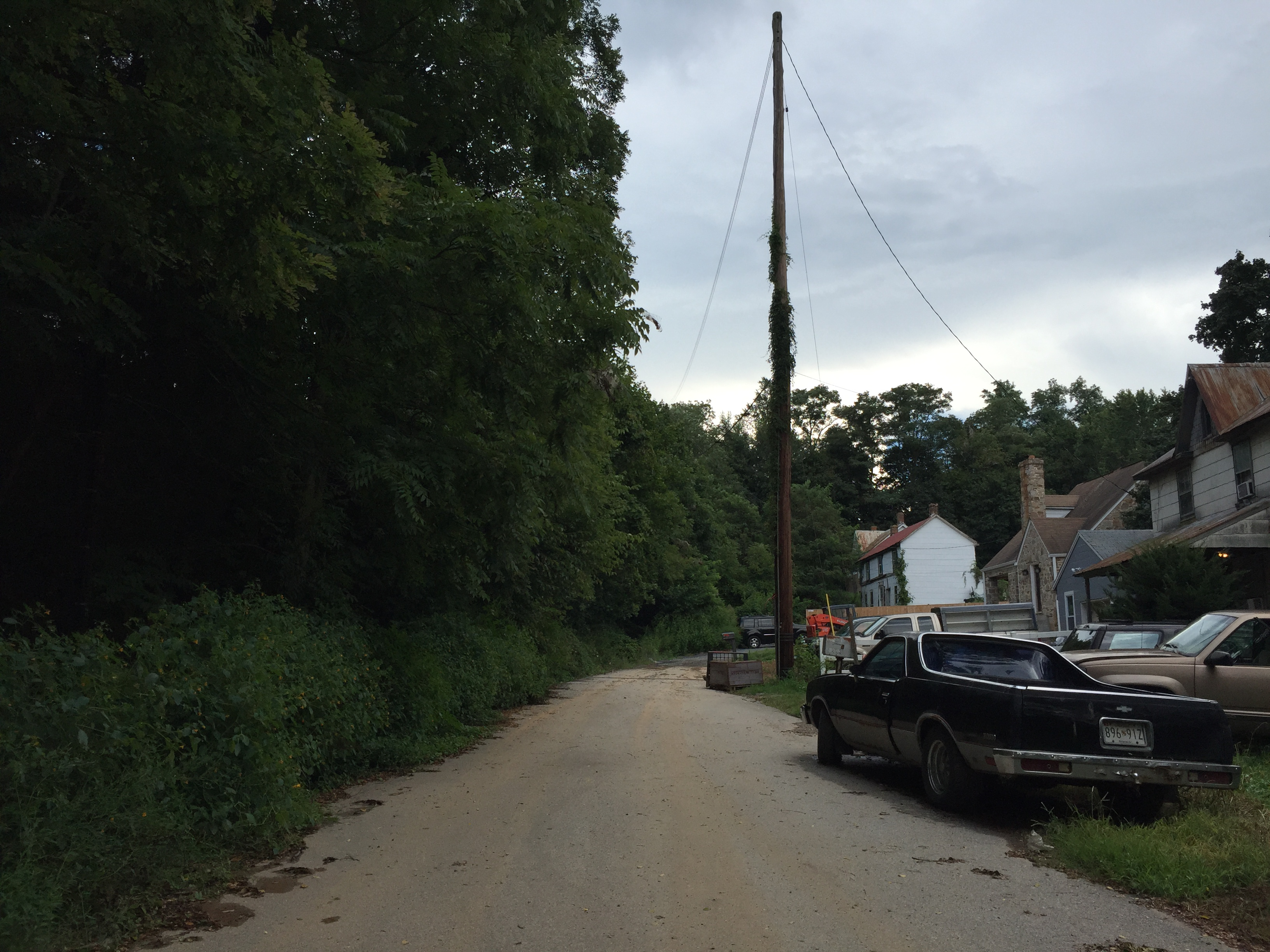
Eastern terminus of MD 850C at a dead end near the junction of MD 26 and MD 27 in Taylorsville

MD 850 comprises several segments of the old alignment of MD 26 from the Frederick–Carroll county line east to Eldersburg. MD 26 from Eldersburg toward Libertytown was built as a concrete road starting with the completion of the road from MD 32 to Dorsey Crossroads, the site of the MD 97 intersection, by 1923. The highway was extended through Winfield in 1924 and 1925. The concrete road was extended to just east of Taylorsville in 1928. The road to Taylorsville was completed in 1930. The final section of MD 26 between Baltimore and Frederick was completed from Taylorsville to west of the Carroll–Frederick county line in 1933. Modernization of MD 26 from the Frederick–Carroll County line to Eldersburg began in 1956 when the section from west of the county line to Taylorsville was placed under construction, including bypasses of MD 850C and MD 850D. In 1957, work began on relocating, widening, and resurfacing MD 26 through Eldersburg and between Taylorsville and Winfield, leading to the designation of MD 850E to the old section of the main highway west of Winfield. The final section of MD 26 in Carroll County to be placed in its modern form was from the western edge of Eldersurg to Winfield, which was completed in 1962 with a grade separation and interchange ramps at the MD 97 junction; Old Liberty Road in that area became MD 850H, MD 850I, and MD 850J.

There have been several changes in the existing segments of MD 850 since they were designated. MD 850D was once a 0.40-mile (0.64 km) single segment that spanned two counties. The 0.19-mile (0.31 km) section of Old Liberty Road between the now-disjoint segments of MD 850D was transferred from state to private maintenance in 2001. In 2004, MD 850I was shortened from 0.07 miles (0.11 km) to its current length. MD 850H's roundabout at MD 97 was installed in 2005. MD 850K was assigned to what had been the eastern end of MD 850H in 2010 when MD 850H was rerouted to use a previously unnumbered spur to MD 26.

There are at least three former sections of MD 850. MD 850F was the designation for a 0.63-mile (1.01 km) stretch of old alignment of MD 26 on the eastbound side of the state highway between MD 26 and a dead end adjacent to the main highway's intersection with Martz Road in Eldersburg. The state highway started as Emerald Lane, then turned east parallel to MD 26 and became Old Liberty Road. MD 850G was the designation for a 0.96-mile (1.54 km) section of Old Liberty Road between two dead ends on the westbound side of MD 26 in Eldersburg. The state highway was connected to MD 26 by county-maintained Linton Road. The eastern end of former MD 850G has been obliterated by new suburban development. MD 850F and MD 850G were created after the relocation of MD 26 through Eldersburg starting in 1957. The highways were removed from the state highway system in 2002. There are two other county-maintained segments of Old Liberty Road east of MD 32 in Eldersburg. One is along the eastbound side of MD 26 east of Carroll Highlands Road. The second is a spur on the westbound side of MD 26 at Oakland Mill Road between two arms of Liberty Reservoir just west of the Carroll–Baltimore county line.

MD 850K was the designation for the 0.31-mile (0.50 km) section of Market Street between MD 355, which headed south as Market Street and north as Routzahn Way, and a partial intersection with MD 26 on the north side of Frederick. MD 850K was the original western end of MD 26 at U.S. Route 15 (US 15). The highway was paved as a macadam road by 1921. The highway was designated MD 31 in 1927 but became part of MD 26 in 1933. This segment was bypassed when MD 26 was extended west as a divided highway from Market Street to modern US 15 when the latter highway was completed in 1959. MD 850K was transferred from the state highway system to municipal maintenance in 2009 concurrent with MD 355 being truncated to south of Frederick.

== Junction list ==
=== MD 850J ===
The entire route is in Winfield, Carroll County.

mi	km	Destinations	Notes
0.00	0.00	Dead end	Western terminus
0.17	0.27	Salem Bottom Road	
0.83	1.34	To MD 26	
1.14	1.83	To MD 26	
1.24	2.00	Dead end	Eastern terminus
1.000 mi = 1.609 km; 1.000 km = 0.621 mi

=== MD 850H ===
The entire route is in Carroll County.

Location	mi	km	Destinations	Notes
Winfield	0.00	0.00	Dead end	Western terminus
Winfield	0.09	0.14	Freter Road	
Eldersburg	1.08	1.74	MD 97 (Old Washington Road) – Westminster, Olney	Roundabout
Eldersburg	1.72	2.77	To MD 26	
Eldersburg	1.77	2.85	Dead end	Eastern terminus
1.000 mi = 1.609 km; 1.000 km = 0.621 mi

== See also ==
- List of roads in Carroll County, Maryland
