= Springfield Presbyterian Church (Sykesville, Maryland) =

Historic church in Maryland, United States

- U.S. National Register of Historic Places
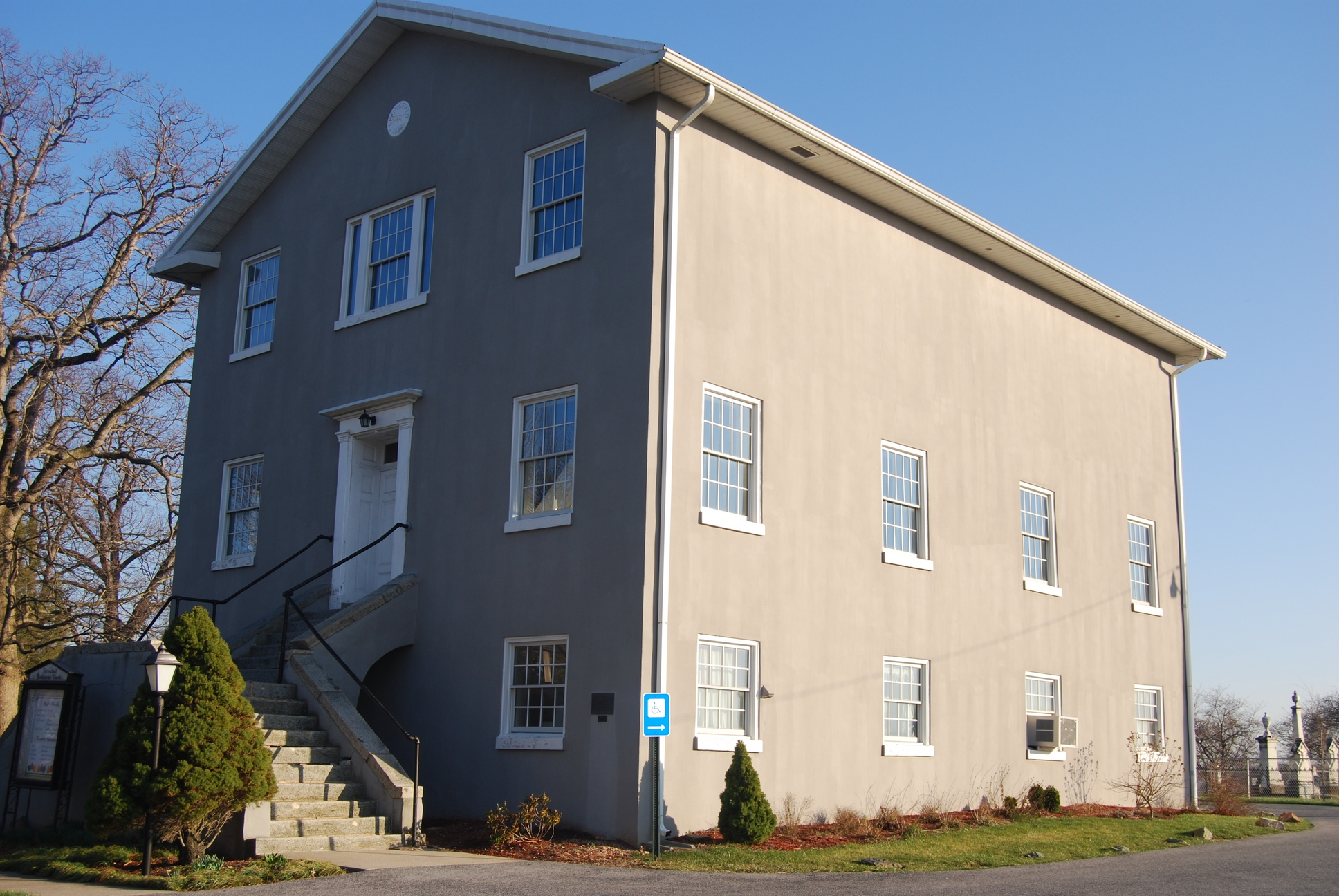
- Springfield Presbyterian Church, March 2009

- Location within Maryland Location within the United States
- Location: 7300 Spout Hill Rd., Sykesville, Maryland
- Coordinates: 39°22′27″N 76°58′24″W
- Area: 1 acre (0.40 ha)
- Built: 1836
- Built by: Oram, John; Forrester, Benjamin
- Architectural style: 19th Century Classicism
- NRHP reference No.: 86002110
- Added to NRHP: July 31, 1986

Springfield Presbyterian Church is a historic Presbyterian church located at Sykesville, Carroll County, Maryland, United States. The church was built in 1836 and is a 3-story structure constructed of uncoursed rubble stone covered in stucco. It served as the area's first school as well as the building of worship for the Presbyterian congregation. The church was founded by immigrants from Scotland and the church holds cultural events to celebrate its Scottish heritage.

The Springfield Presbyterian Church was listed on the National Register of Historic Places in 1986.
