= Henryton Heights, Maryland =

Unincorporated community in Maryland, US

Coordinates: 39°19′26″N 76°55′19″W

Henryton Heights is an unincorporated community in Howard County, Maryland, United States.
