= West Friendship, Maryland =

Unincorporated community in Maryland, United States

- Location in Maryland
- Coordinates: 39°18.9′N 76°57.1′W
- Country: United States of America
- State: Maryland
- County: Howard
- Established: November 10, 1864

Area
  - Total: 7.34 sq mi (19.0 km^{2})

Population
  - Total: 2,280
  - Density: 378/sq mi (146/km^{2})
- Time zone: UTC-5 (EST)
  - Summer (DST): UTC-4 (EDT)
- ZIP code: 21794
- Area code: 410/443/667

West Friendship is a semi-rural unincorporated community in western Howard County, Maryland, United States. West Friendship is located at the junction of Interstate 70 and Maryland Route 32. Frederick Road (Maryland Route 144) is a main thoroughfare.

== History ==
Like many small communities in Howard County, West Friendship developed slowly as settlers moved west. As adventurers set out to survey the area, they established land tracts in the 1700s, many before the Revolutionary War. Stein's history (1972) lists land grants given to families whose descendants live in the area today. The families of Warfield, Ridgely, Selby, Hobbs, Cross, and Cissel helped create what is now West Friendship.

In the 19th century, the main road through West Friendship was filled with travelers who could find comfort at mile houses along the route. The population of West Friendship totaled fifty by 1887. Some came to settle; others, such as the circuit rider ministers, rode on horseback from church to church, making it more convenient for residents to attend the nearest service. Early travel was difficult, but most residents were adept at horseback riding. Many traveled over the Frederick Turnpike built in the 1790s. Empty land soon gave way to Thomas S. Cross' general store and post office in West Friendship.

In the 20th century, paved roads and the automobile replaced country roads and the horse and buggy. The paving of the West Friendship-Sykesville Road (MD 32) by the state in 1910 was an important development for the community. Social gatherings continued to center around farming in the 1940s. Before then, the Howard County Grange Competitions were held at Brendel Manor Park and in one resident's front yard. After moving to Freestate Raceway and Ellicott City High, residents set up the groundwork for the present Howard County Fair in 1953, to be held annually in West Friendship.

West Friendship's one-room school house provided a primary education for many residents in the early 1900s. In 1925, the High and Consolidated School at West Friendship was constructed, replacing all nearby one-room schools, and area residents came by school bus to attend. Over the next few decades, there were several additions, and it became an elementary school. The school was rebuilt in 1978.

Large homes dot farms and rolling hills in West Friendship.

=== 21st century ===
Strict zoning regulations have largely limited sprawl and preserved the community's bucolic character. Large farms and historic homes still cover the area's gently rolling hills and many farms remain inhabited by descendants of the earlier aristocratic families. Wide expanses of farmland, meadows, woods and parks abound. However, as with most areas within an hour's drive of the Baltimore-Washington corridor, West Friendship is seeing a steady rise of residential development. Suburban subdivisions, many with 4000+ square-foot homes on 1+ acre lots, are becoming increasingly common. In 2012, West Friendship was ranked as the most expensive suburb in the Baltimore metropolitan area according to the Baltimore Sun. In the newer subdivisions, homes commonly sell for over $1 million.

Typical neighborhood in West Friendship.

== Demographics ==
In 2009, the estimated population of West Friendship (zip code 21794) was 2,777 persons, with 1,763 households. The median age is 36.5 years. The racial make-up of West Friendship was 87.1% White, 3.5% African American, 9.1% Asian, and 0.3% Hispanic. 90.6% of the population speak English at home. Foreign-born residents compose 7.9% of the community. The most common countries of origin were Nigeria (23%), United Kingdom (22%), Taiwan (14%) and Canada (10%).

According to the U.S. Census Bureau, the average family income was $229,962 in 2017, one of the highest in Maryland. More than 57% of families earned more than $200,000 per year. The average family net worth in 2013 was $1.81 million. An estimated 0.9% of families have an income below the poverty level.

Most West Friendship residents commute to work in the Baltimore-Washington corridor. More than half (54%) of families have three or more vehicles. The mean commute is 30–34 minutes. 88% of residents drive to work, and 34.7% of residents work within Howard County.

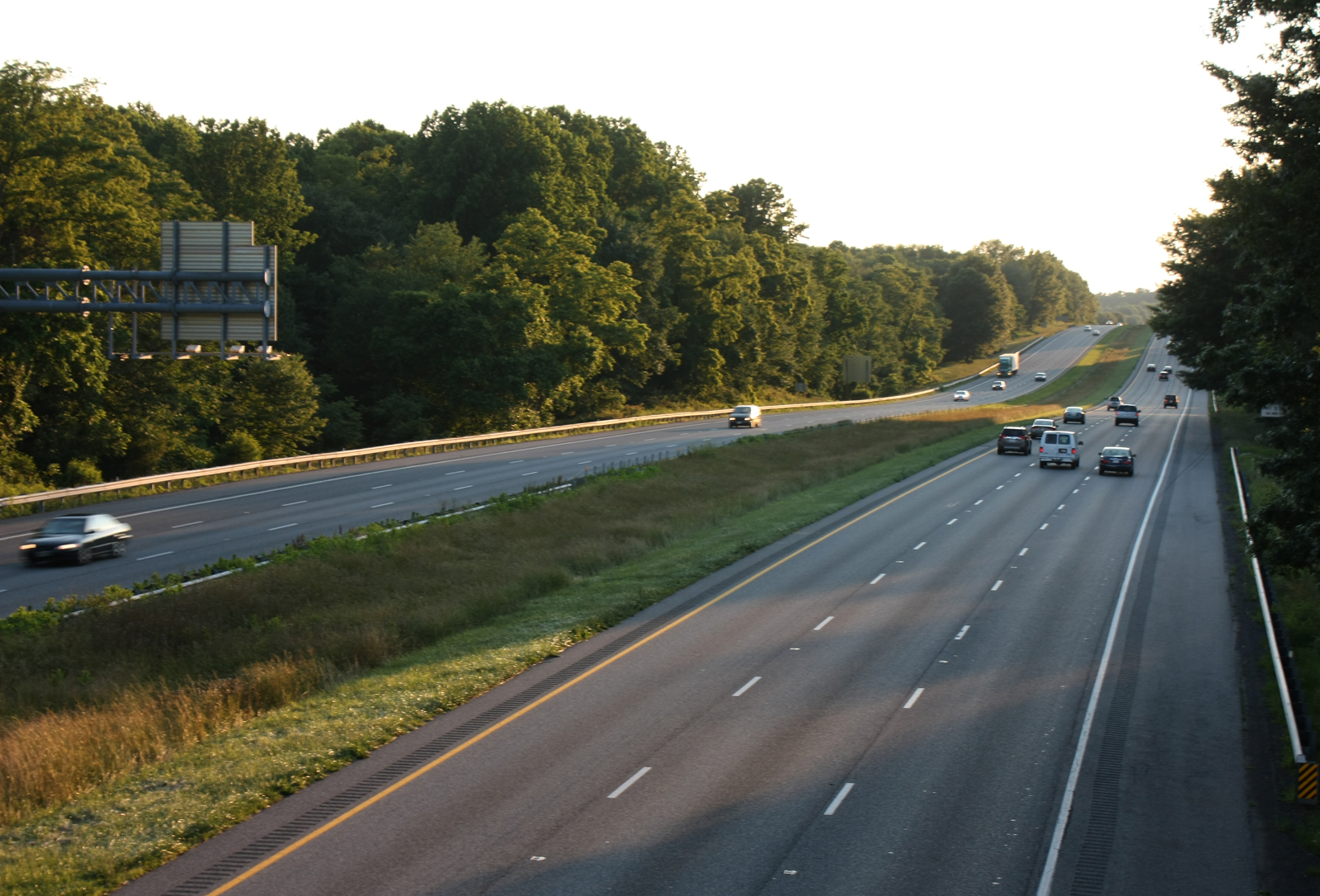
Interstate 70 through West Friendship.

== Education ==
West Friendship is located in the Howard County Public School District. Elementary school children in West Friendship are zoned for West Friendship Elementary School, Bushy Park Elementary School or Triadelphia Ridge Elementary School. Middle school students attend Mount View Middle School or Folly Quarter Middle School. Most high school students attend Glenelg High School or Marriotts Ridge High School.

Private school options in the area include the Glenelg Country School and the Glenwood Country Day School. 28% of local students attend private school.

== Attractions ==
The Howard County Fairgrounds is located on Route 144 in West Friendship, and is the home of the annual Howard County Fair and the Maryland Sheep and Wool Festival. Another popular event is the Howard County Motorcycle Swap meet, hosted several times a year. This is one of the oldest "motorcycle swap meets" in the nation. The Howard County Living Farm Heritage Museum was located across from the Howard County Fairgrounds but their lease was terminated in 2023 and the county will be utilizing the location.

The community is close to several parks. West Friendship Park offers hiking and nature walks. Western Regional Park offers a large children's playground and several sports fields. The Willow Springs Golf Course is an 18-hole, executive, links-style golf course also in West Friendship.

The community has a small shopping center which houses the West Friendship branch of the US Post Office, banks, several restaurants and stores, medical offices, and a gas station.

West Friendship is served by the West Friendship Volunteer Fire Department which has been in service since 1944.

== Climate ==
Like much of Howard County, West Friendship is located at the northern edge of the humid subtropical climate zone (Köppen climate classification Cfa), with mild to cool winters and hot humid summers. Precipitation is plentiful and spread evenly throughout the year. Snowfall varies greatly from year to year, but averages 22.4 inches annually.

Climate data for West Friendship, MD
| Month | Jan | Feb | Mar | Apr | May | Jun | Jul | Aug | Sep | Oct | Nov | Dec | Year |
|---|---|---|---|---|---|---|---|---|---|---|---|---|---|
| Record high °F (°C) | 74 (23) | 80 (27) | 89 (32) | 95 (35) | 96 (36) | 100 (38) | 103 (39) | 103 (39) | 99 (37) | 88 (31) | 84 (29) | 78 (26) | 103 (39) |
| Mean daily maximum °F (°C) | 41 (5) | 45 (7) | 55 (13) | 66 (19) | 75 (24) | 83 (28) | 87 (31) | 85 (29) | 79 (26) | 68 (20) | 56 (13) | 45 (7) | 65 (19) |
| Mean daily minimum °F (°C) | 22 (−6) | 24 (−4) | 31 (−1) | 39 (4) | 49 (9) | 58 (14) | 63 (17) | 61 (16) | 54 (12) | 42 (6) | 34 (1) | 26 (−3) | 42 (5) |
| Record low °F (°C) | −18 (−28) | −17 (−27) | 3 (−16) | 16 (−9) | 26 (−3) | 34 (1) | 40 (4) | 37 (3) | 30 (−1) | 17 (−8) | 11 (−12) | −6 (−21) | −18 (−28) |
| Average precipitation inches (mm) | 3.42 (87) | 2.97 (75) | 4.15 (105) | 3.51 (89) | 4.71 (120) | 3.84 (98) | 4.03 (102) | 3.90 (99) | 4.17 (106) | 3.49 (89) | 3.56 (90) | 3.52 (89) | 45.27 (1,149) |

== See also ==
- Howard County Fair Association
- Pfefferkorn House and Granary
- Poverty Discovered
- West Friendship Volunteer Fire Department
