= Warfield Complex, Hubner, and T Buildings =

Historic district in Maryland, United States

- U.S. National Register of Historic Places
- U.S. Historic district
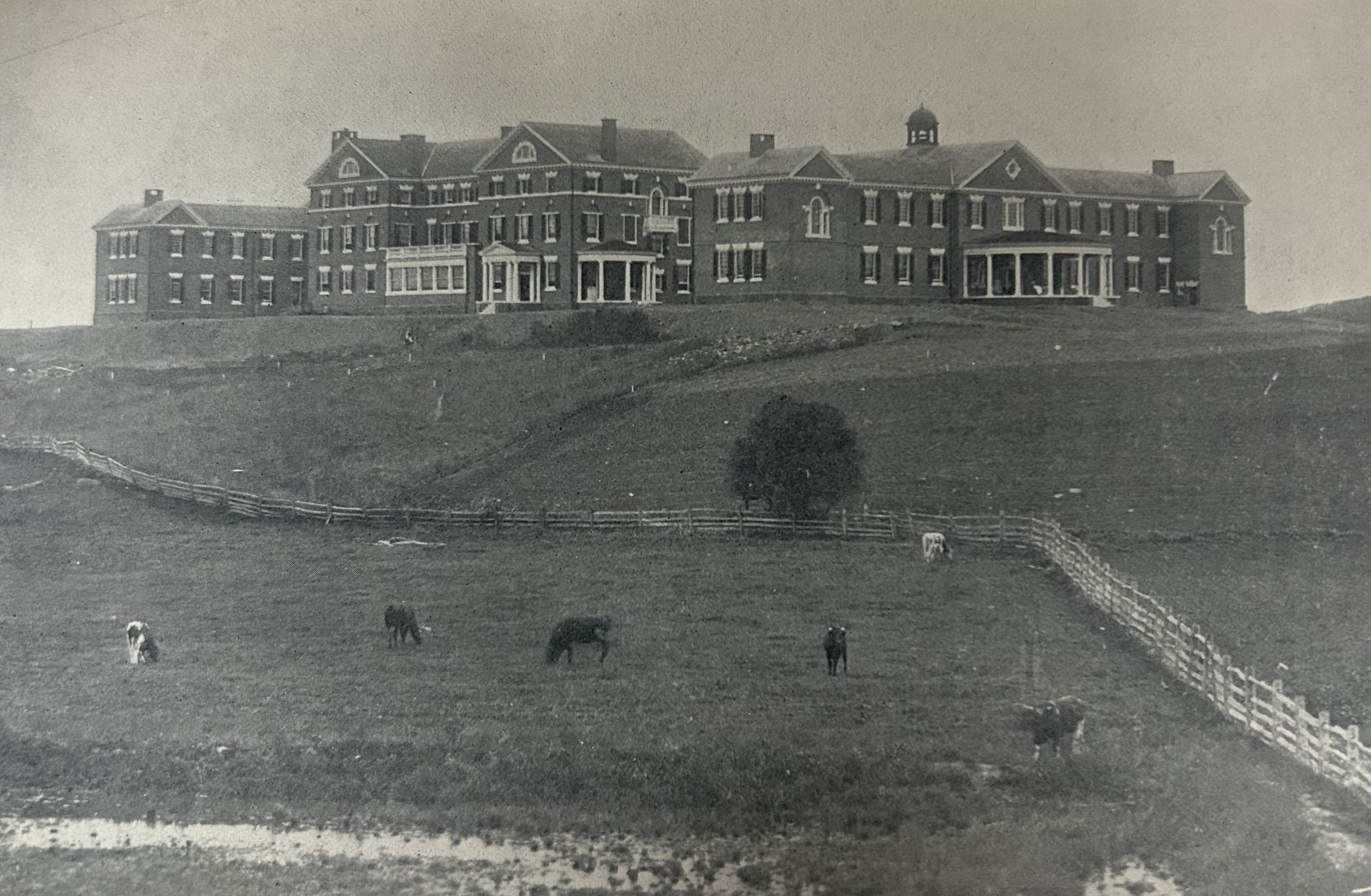
- Warfield Complex (c. 1900)

- Location within Maryland Location within the United States
- Location: Springfield Hospital Center, Sykesville, Maryland
- Coordinates: 39°22′43″N 76°57′41″W
- Area: 75 acres (30 ha)
- Built: 1898
- Architectural style: Colonial Revival
- NRHP reference No.: 00001271
- Added to NRHP: November 2, 2000

Warfield Complex, Hubner, and T Buildings is a national historic district located at Sykesville, Carroll County, Maryland, United States. It comprises the historic core of the women's facility at Springfield State Hospital, a public mental institution. It was developed over the period 1898–1939. The complex comprises 16 contributing resources unified by a consistently high level of architectural elaboration in the Georgian and Colonial Revival style.

It was added to the National Register of Historic Places in 2000.
