= Springfield Hospital Center =

Hospital in Maryland, United States

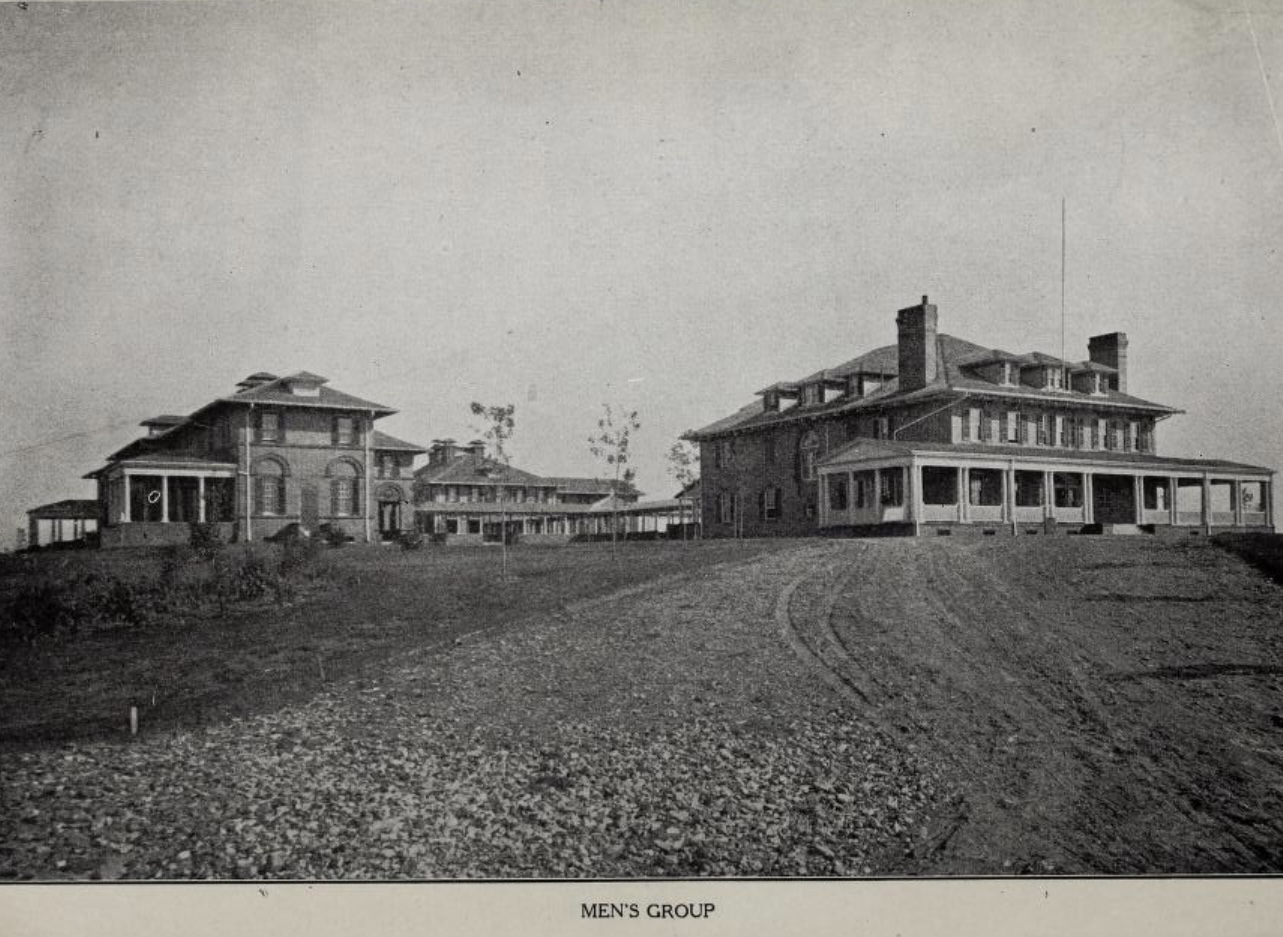
Springfield State Hospital, Sykesville, Maryland (c. 1898)

Springfield Hospital Center is a regional psychiatric hospital located in Sykesville, Maryland, United States. First opening its doors in 1896.

William Patterson, a founder of the B&O railroad, purchased the 4,000 acre farm "Springfield" in 1797 as a summer home. The estate was later purchased by Frank Brown who would become the Governor of Maryland. While serving as governor, he sold the estate to the State of Maryland for a mental hospital.

== History ==
When the hospital was opened in 1896 it was called "The Second Hospital for the Insane of Maryland", often referred to as the Asylum at Springfield. Due to significant overcrowding, 40 male patients were transferred from the Spring Grove State Hospital in Catsonsville and were housed in one of the existing farm houses (Buttercup Cottage) on the southern end of the Springfield campus. They lived there for 2 years while the first phase of construction (Men's Group Quad) was underway. These buildings were to be constructed according to the new "Cottage Plan" design. Springfield was the second hospital in the country to adapt this plan (first being Medfield State Hospital). This innovative way of construction was created after flaws began appearing in hospitals that were built according to the prior Kirkbride Design (one large building). It was thought that having separate buildings or "pavilions" would help with the operation, administration, and care of the patients that inhabited it. After the completion of the first hospital buildings in 1898, the existing patients (then called "inmates") were transferred to the new buildings and a group of male epileptic patients took their spots in the Buttercup Cottage.

After several reports were done on the operation of the new buildings, more land was cleared for the second phase of construction (Women's Group Quad). These buildings would be built very similarly to those at the Men's Group with a few minor changes. Situated on the extreme southern end of the campus, the group was to be as far away from the male area as possible as the men were housed on the extreme northern side of the hospital.

These two groups were largely expanded over a roughly 30-year period and now consist of 13 historic buildings each. However construction at the hospital did not just occur at these two complexes. Several more groups of buildings were added to the hospital throughout the years, including the powerplant, railroad (Dinky Line), John Hubner Psychopathic Building, epileptic colony, tuberculosis unit, farm colony, staff homes, superintendent's mansion (Patterson house), and patient cemetery (Sunnyside).

=== Model Institution ===
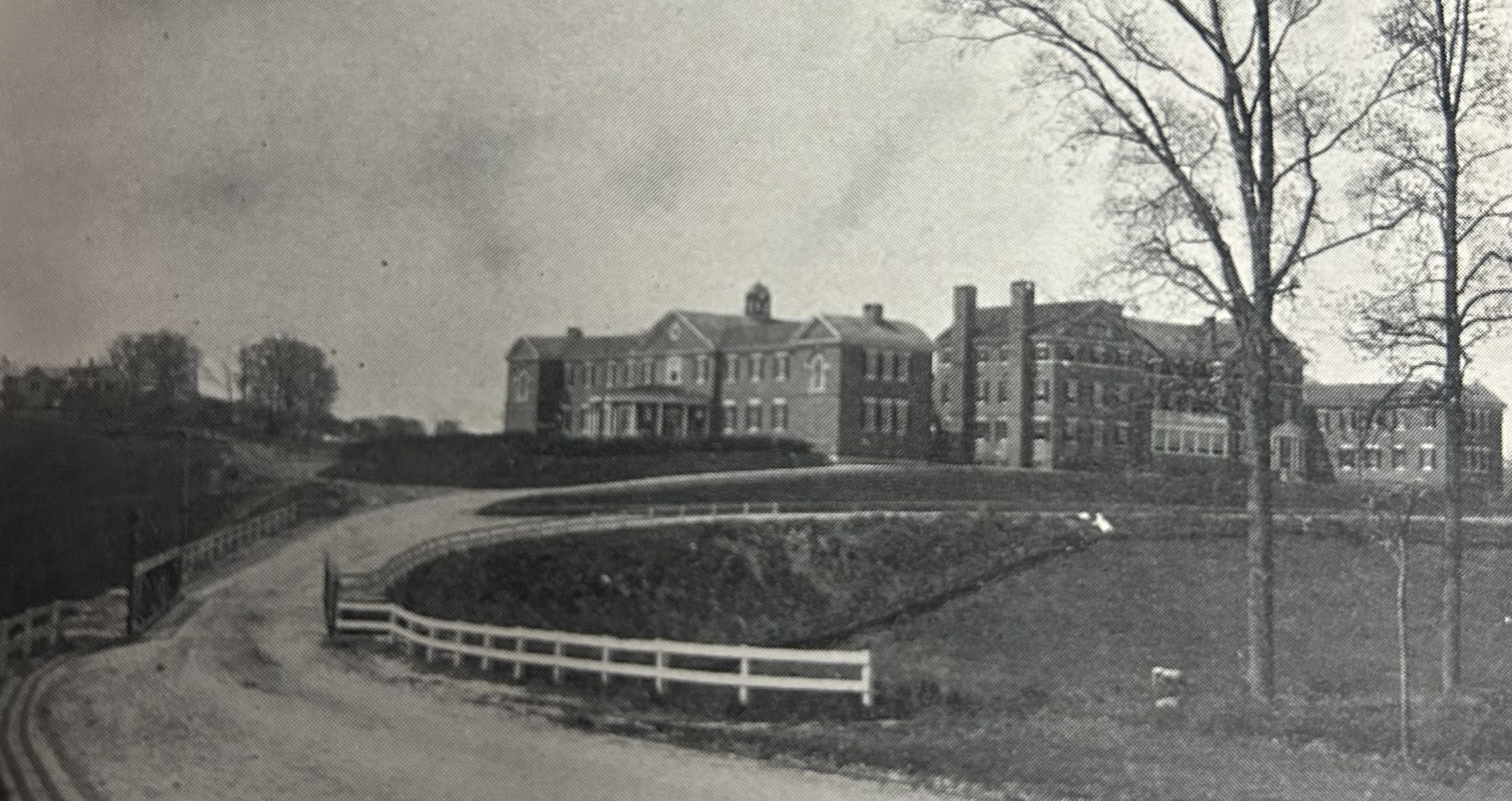
Women's Group - Springfield State Hospital, Sykesville, Maryland (c. 1900)

After the first two phases of construction (Men's Group & Women's Group), Springfield was given the title of a "Model Institution". This designation was very rare and only few hospitals of its kind had received it. Due to Springfield's progressive methods of treatment, construction and administration, institutions far and wide were created using Springfield as a reference. The administrative staff created an "open-door policy" at Springfield, meaning that patients had free roam of the grounds and were not confined or isolated in any way. Because this policy was unheard of at the time and had never been used prior, many superintendents and officers from other institutions had their doubts as to how well the policy would work and the effects it may have on the patients if they are given "too much free will". They were proven wrong after Springfield had some of the lowest patient escape rates in the country (even lower than some places that had locked doors & barred windows). Springfield proved itself to be the beacon of what mental health care should look like and retains that image to this day.

== Maryland's Shame ==
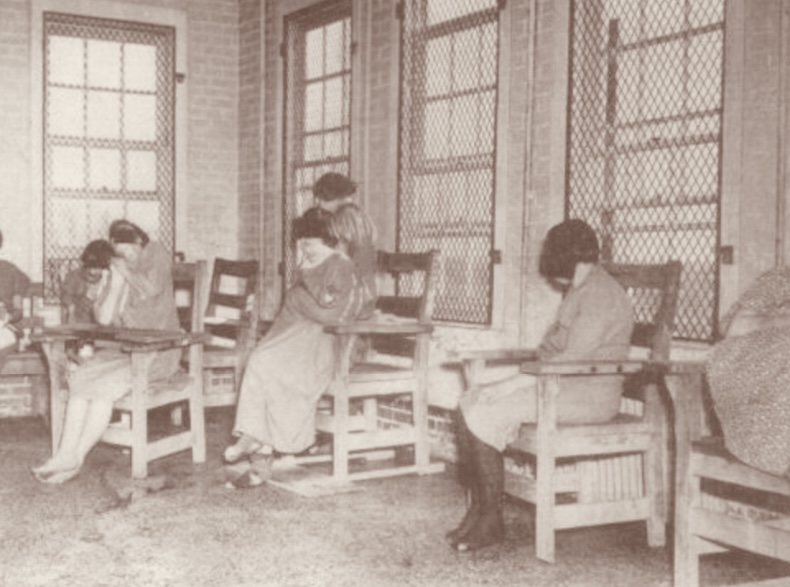
Patients locked in chairs and straight jackets at Springfield's Epileptic Colony (c. 1949)

In the 1940s a series of articles were released by the Baltimore Sun entitled "Maryland's Shame". These articles detailed the deplorable conditions inside Maryland's mental hospitals at that time. The Sun visited each institution in Maryland and photographed the horrific sights, took note of the extremely disproportionate ratio of patient to staff population, wrote horror stories told by nurses and doctors about some of the events that took place at the hospitals, etc. Because Springfield was the state's "crowned jewel" of hospitals, seeing the grotesque images that were taking place inside the institution during that era shocked people to the core. Rooms crammed tight with patients sitting on dirty floors, patients tied tightly in chairs unable to move freely, soiled bedding, isolation wards with emaciated individuals sitting blankly, etc.

Much of these horrors are to be blamed by the second world war. The hospital was adequately funded, staffed, and reported on for the entirety of its life leading up to the creation of "Maryland's Shame". Because many varying employees at the hospital were leaving to join the service, it caused the staff population to plummet rapidly. Furthermore, veterans were returning from war with mental illnesses such as PTSD which was not understood at that time. Because of this, they were placed in institutional care and that caused the patient population at the hospital (particularly the men's group) to skyrocket.

However once the articles were released, and the public outcry was received, the state pulled funds to renovate old buildings, adequately staff the hospital, and construct two new and extremely large buildings at both the men's and women's groups. The conditions inside the hospital gradually improved again and there were very few complaints regarding conditions or abuse afterward.

== Downsizing ==
The hospital grew to be the largest mental institution on the East Coast and at its height housed over 4,000 patients. Springfield operated at full scale until the 1970s and 80s when deinstitutionalization hit and it succumbed to the downsizing that most institutions of its kind endured. Many hospitals were closed entirely. However Springfield remained open and now operates on a much smaller scale.

It is operated by the Maryland Department of Health through the Mental Hygiene Administration. Parts of the historic core of the hospital were added to the National Register of Historic Places as the Warfield Complex, Hubner, and T Buildings in 2000.

== See also ==
- Henryton State Hospital
- Spring Grove State Hospital
- Crownsville State Hospital
- Rosewood Center
- Forest Haven
