= Maryland Route 496 =

State highway in Maryland, United States

Maryland Route 496
- Bachmans Valley Road
- Maryland Route 496 highlighted in red

Route information
- Maintained by MDSHA
- Length: 7.23 mi (11.64 km)
- Existed: 1933–present
- Tourist routes: Mason and Dixon Scenic Byway

Major junctions
- West end: MD 97 near Pleasant Valley
- East end: MD 30 near Melrose

Location
- Country: United States
- State: Maryland
- Counties: Carroll

Highway system
- Maryland highway system; Interstate; US; State; Scenic Byways
← MD 495	→ MD 497

Maryland Route 496 (MD 496) is a state highway in the U.S. state of Maryland. Known as Bachmans Valley Road, the state highway runs 7.23 miles (11.64 km) from MD 97 near Pleasant Valley east to MD 30 in Melrose. MD 496 was constructed from Pleasant Valley to Bachman Mills in the mid-1930s. The state highway was completed to Melrose in the late 1940s.

== Route description ==
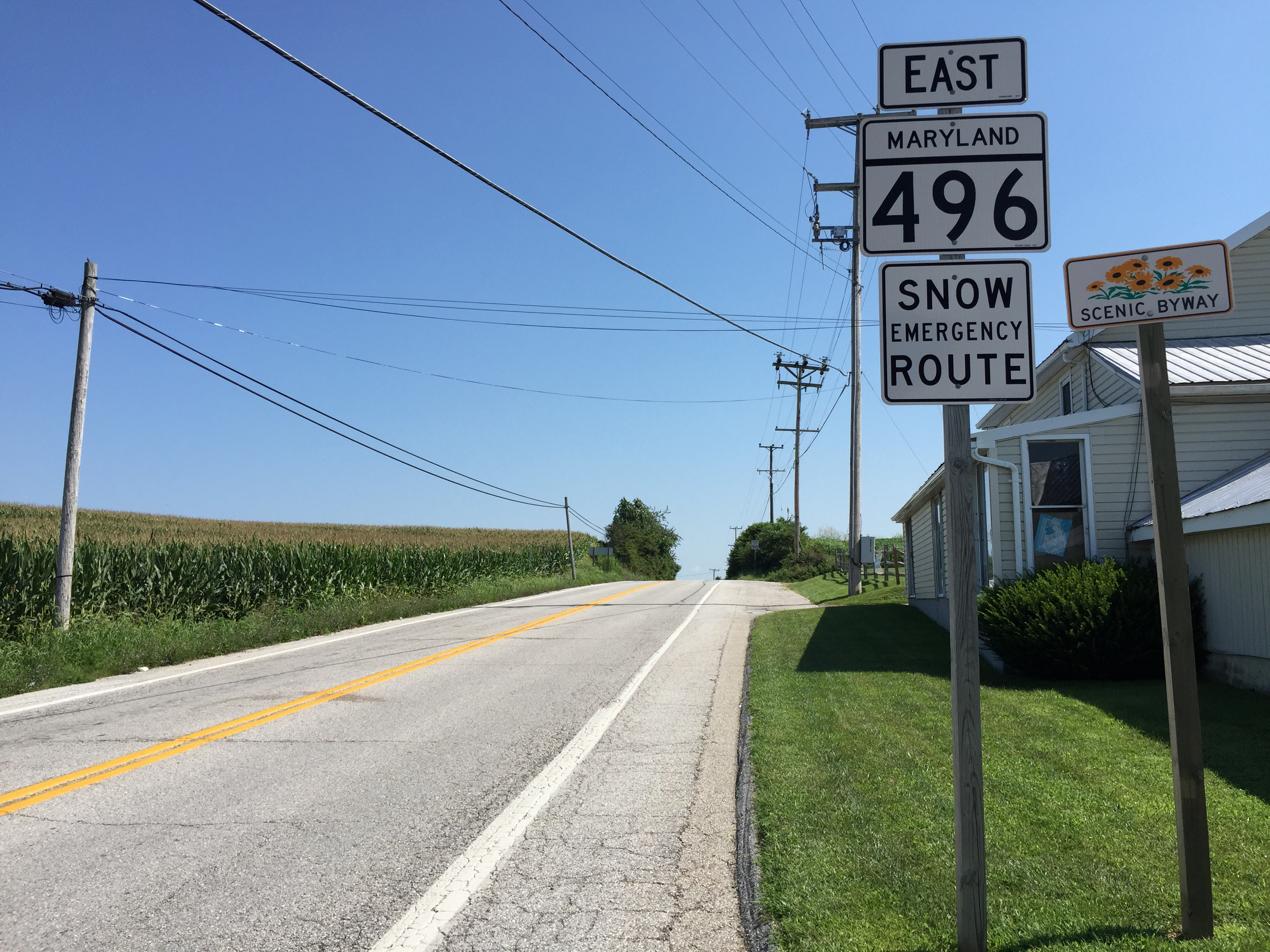
View east at the west end of MD 496 at MD 97 near Pleasant Valley

MD 496 begins at an intersection with MD 97 (Littlestown Pike) near the hamlet of Pleasant Valley north of Westminster. The state highway heads northeast as a two-lane undivided road through farmland. MD 496 crosses Bear Branch, on which lies the Bear Branch Nature Center, and passes Saw Mill Road, which leads to the Whittaker Chambers Farm. The state highway intersects Old Bachmans Valley Road just south of the hamlet of Bachman Mills, where the highway crosses Big Pipe Creek. Old Bachmans Valley Road leads southwest to the historic Christian Royer House and John Orendorff Farm. MD 496 continues northeast to the community of Melrose north of Manchester, where the state highway reaches its eastern terminus at MD 30 (Hanover Pike). The roadway continues northeast as county-maintained Wentz Road.

== History ==
The first sections of MD 496 from what was then U.S. Route 140 (now MD 97) to Bachman Mills were completed as a concrete road by 1933. The next segment of the state highway was constructed from Bachman Mills to near Hoover Mill Road between 1934 and 1936. Traffic from Bachman Mills to Melrose followed county-maintained Ebbvale Road until MD 496 was completed as a macadam road on a new alignment to MD 30 in 1947.

== Junction list ==
The entire route is in Carroll County.

Location	mi	km	Destinations	Notes
Pleasant Valley	0.00	0.00	MD 97 (Littlestown Pike) – Westminster, Union Mills	Western terminus
Melrose	7.23	11.64	MD 30 (Hanover Pike) / Wentz Road east – Hanover, Manchester	Eastern terminus
1.000 mi = 1.609 km; 1.000 km = 0.621 mi

== See also ==
- List of roads in Carrol County, Maryland
