= Maryland Route 30 =

State highway in Maryland, US

Maryland Route 30
- Maryland Route 30 highlighted in red

Route information
- Maintained by MDSHA
- Length: 19.16 mi (30.84 km)
- Existed: 1927–present
- Tourist routes: Mason and Dixon Scenic Byway

Major junctions
- South end: MD 140 in Reisterstown
- MD 128 / MD 795 in Reisterstown; MD 91 near Upperco; MD 482 in Hampstead; MD 27 in Manchester; MD 86 in Manchester; MD 496 at Melrose
- North end: PA 94 near Melrose

Location
- Country: United States
- State: Maryland
- Counties: Baltimore, Carroll

Highway system
- Maryland highway system; Interstate; US; State; Scenic Byways
← US 29	→ MD 31

Maryland Route 30 (MD 30) is a state highway in the U.S. state of Maryland. Known for most of its length as Hanover Pike, the highway runs 19.16 miles (30.84 km) from MD 140 in Reisterstown north to the Pennsylvania state line near Melrose, where the highway continues as Pennsylvania Route 94 (PA 94). MD 30 is a major, two-lane regional highway in western Baltimore County and northeastern Carroll County. Locally, the highway serves the towns of Manchester and Hampstead; the latter town is bypassed by the highway but served by a business route. Regionally, MD 30 connects Reisterstown and Baltimore with Hanover, Pennsylvania.

MD 30 originated in the colonial era as part of a wagon road connecting the fledgling port of Baltimore with the new settlement that was to become Hanover. This highway was improved as a turnpike in the 19th century. MD 30 was constructed as a state road by the Maryland State Roads Commission in the late 1910s and early 1920s, and it became one of the original state-numbered highways in 1927. The state highway was relocated and widened near Reisterstown in the late 1930s and along the rest of its route in the early 1950s. The Hampstead Bypass was planned as early as the 1960s to ameliorate the increasing congestion along the MD 30 corridor that was only exacerbated when Interstate 795 (I-795) was completed to Reisterstown in the late 1980s. However, the construction of the bypass was continually delayed due to environmental issues and politics. The bypass was finally constructed between 2006 and 2009; the old highway through Hampstead became MD 30 Business. A MD 30 bypass of Manchester has also been discussed since the 1960s, but the Maryland State Highway Administration (MDSHA) has no plans to construct the new highway in the foreseeable future.

== Route description ==
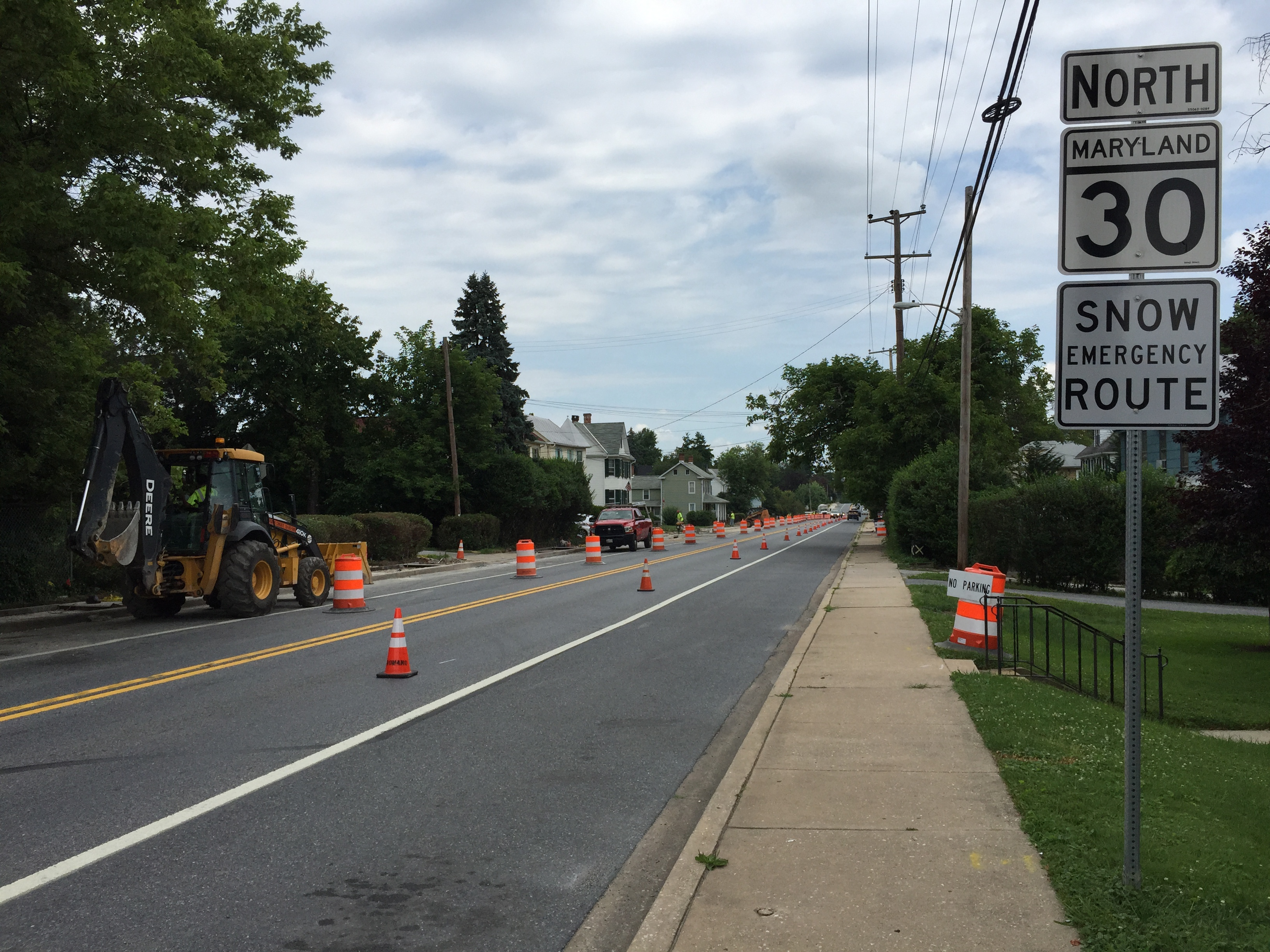
View north from the south end of MD 30 at MD 140 in Reisterstown

MD 30 begins within the Reisterstown Historic District at an intersection with MD 140, which heads south as Main Street and northwest as Westminster Pike. The state highway heads north as two-lane undivided Hanover Pike through a residential area to a four-way intersection with MD 128 (Butler Road) and unsigned MD 795, a connector between MD 30 and the northern terminus of I-795 (Northwest Expressway) at MD 140 that serves as a bypass of Reisterstown for MD 30 traffic. As the highway leaves Reisterstown, Old Hanover Pike splits to the northeast and MD 30 crosses over the Maryland Midland Railway. Old Hanover Pike reconnects with the state highway where the highway briefly parallels CSX's Hanover Subdivision railroad line and passes to the east of the Montrose Mansion and Chapel. At the hamlet of Woodensburg, the old road splits northeast again to follow the railroad through the village of Boring. The railroad and old road return to MD 30 again just north of the state highway's intersection with MD 91 (Emory Road). MD 30 parallels the railroad through the community of Upperco, which is also known as Arcadia, before crossing the Baltimore–Carroll county line.

Shortly after entering Carroll County, MD 30 curves northwest and meets the southern end of MD 30 Business (Hanover Pike) and Phillips Drive at a roundabout. While the business route heads north through the center of Hampstead, MD 30 passes to the west of the town on the Hampstead Bypass, which has two lanes but expands to a three- or four-lane divided highway for short stretches on either side of its roundabouts. The state highway passes under Houcksville Road and over Shiloh Road before meeting MD 482 (Hampstead–Mexico Road) at a roundabout. MD 30 reunites with the northern end of MD 30 Business at a roundabout in the community of Greenmount. The state highway, once again named Hanover Pike, has a short four-lane divided section through a commercial area before reducing to a two-lane undivided road.

MD 30 enters the town of Manchester as Main Street as the highway passes west of Manchester Valley High School. In the center of town, the highway intersects Westminster Street and York Street; along the latter street is Charlotte's Quest Nature Center. MD 30 meets the northern end of MD 27 (Manchester Road) on the northern edge of downtown and the southern end of MD 86 (Lineboro Road) at the north town limit. There is no direct access from southbound MD 30 to northbound MD 86; that movement is made via Hallie Avenue, the next intersection to the south. MD 30 crosses Dug Hill Ridge just north of MD 86 and passes through the community of Melrose, where the highway intersects the eastern terminus of MD 496 (Bachmans Valley Road) and Wentz Road. The state highway follows the upper reaches of the South Branch of Gunpowder Falls through a ridge to the river's source before reaching its northern terminus at the Pennsylvania state line. The highway continues as PA 94 (Baltimore Pike) through southwestern York County to Hanover.

MD 30 is a part of the main National Highway System for its entire length except for the short segment in Reisterstown south of MD 128 and MD 795; that short segment is a National Highway System principal arterial.

== History ==
=== Wagon road to state highway ===
The first road along the corridor of MD 30 was a wagon road cut along an existing Indian trail in 1736 and 1737 to connect the Conewago Settlement, which later became Hanover, with Baltimore Town, which served as a much closer port for farmers and merchants in York County and Adams County, Pennsylvania, than Philadelphia. This road became known as the Conewago Road, Pack Horse Road, or the Wheelbarrow Road, the last due to the namesake implements being used to haul stones to widen the road by order of Maryland in 1793. The highway became a toll road with the 1805 incorporation of the Baltimore and Reisterstown Turnpike Company, which operated between the two towns and split into Westminster and Hanover branches in Reisterstown. The latter branch became known as the Hanover Turnpike or the Baltimore and Hanover Turnpike and had ceased to collect tolls by 1899.

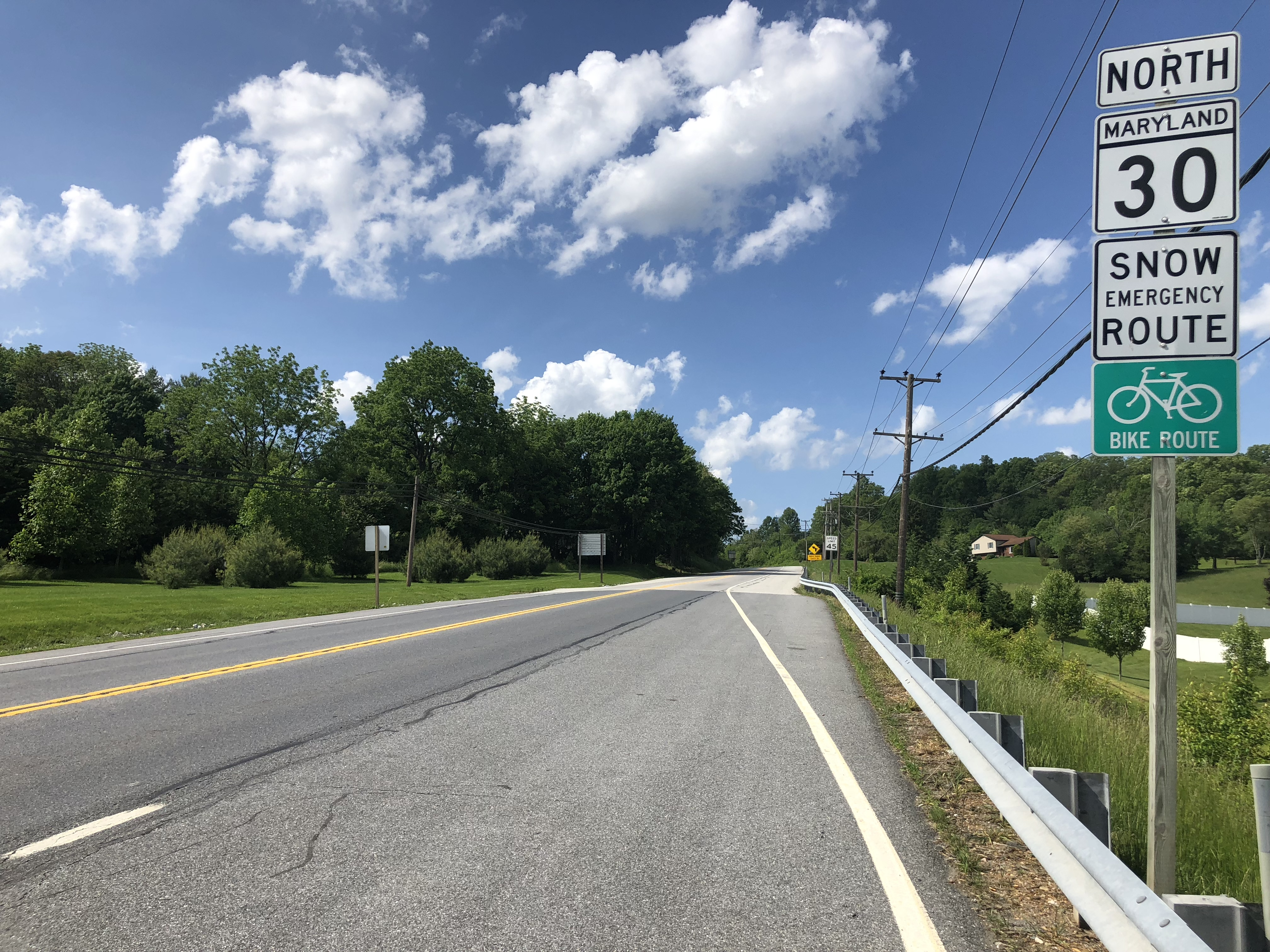
MD 30 northbound past MD 86 in Manchester

Work on modern MD 30 began in 1918 with the construction of a 39-foot (12 m)-wide street through Reisterstown and a 15-to-16-foot (4.6 to 4.9 m) concrete road north from Reisterstown to Woodensburg. By 1921, the whole length of future MD 30 was planned for improvement and the concrete road had been extended to the southern end of Hampstead; in addition, Main Street in Manchester had been paved in concrete. Main Street in Hampstead was rebuilt as a concrete street and the remainder of the highway to the Pennsylvania line, excluding Main Street in Manchester, was completed as a macadam road in 1923. MD 30 was one of the original state-numbered highways marked in 1927.

By 1934, the entire length of MD 30 was proposed to be widened from its existing width of 15 to 16 feet (4.6 to 4.9 m) to 20 feet (6.1 m). The only major relocation of MD 30 in the 20th century was the elimination of a grade crossing at the Western Maryland Railway (now the Maryland Midland Railway) at Glen Morris. The present bridge over the railroad was completed in 1936, but the relocated highway, which replaced what is now Old Hanover Road to the east, was not placed under construction until 1938 and did not open until 1939. MD 30 was widened from Hampstead south to the Baltimore–Carroll county line in 1938 with a pair of 3-foot (0.91 m)-wide macadam shoulders, expanding the road's width to 21 feet (6.4 m). MD 30 was relocated in a few spots, widened, and resurfaced from the county line north to Manchester in 1950, from the county line south to the north end of the Glen Morris relocation in 1951 and 1952, and from Manchester north to the Pennsylvania state line in 1953 and 1954.

=== Bypasses of Hampstead and Manchester ===
A MD 30 bypass of Hampstead has been contemplated since the 1940s and planned since at least 1960. The heavy traffic along the highway consisted of three types of highway users: local traffic made up of people who had moved to Hampstead or Manchester for the municipalities' small-town charm; regional traffic comprising people who had moved to Pennsylvania for cheaper housing and lower taxes but continued to work in the Baltimore area; and truck traffic serving local industry and making connections between Baltimore and Hanover. The increase in congestion on MD 30 accelerated with the completion of I-795 in 1987. By the early 1990s, it took as long as 15 minutes for motorists to pass through each of the towns during rush hour; an average of 20,000 to 25,000 motorists used the highway through Hampstead each day by 2001. Progress toward construction of the bypass was continually delayed. The bypass was removed from MDSHA plans by 1979. The Hampstead Bypass had returned to state plans by 1990, when engineering and design work was underway and construction was planned to begin in 1992. However, in 1991, the bypass was shelved for six years for lack of funding.

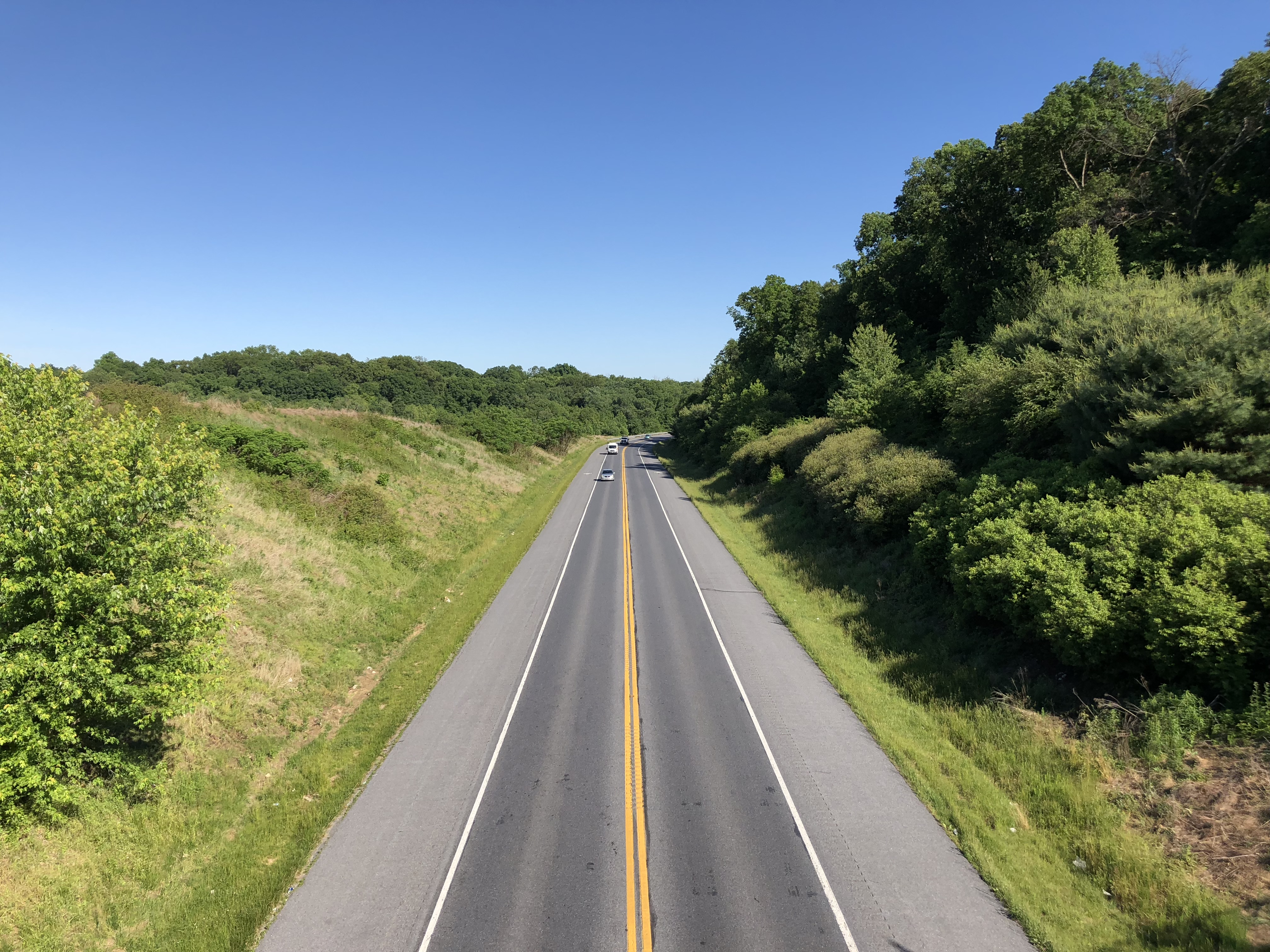
MD 30 southbound along the Hampstead Bypass

There have been several causes of the continual postponement of the bypass. In 1991, heavy groundwater contamination by industrial chemicals was discovered near the southern end of the proposed route, then 5.8 miles (9.3 km) long, at a Black & Decker factory and near the northern end of the planned route at a shopping center. The bypass route changed again in 1994 when a population of bog turtles was discovered along the bypass route. The bog turtle has been on the Maryland endangered species list since 1972 and was added to the "threatened" list under the U.S. Endangered Species Act in 1997. In 1998, the route of the Hampstead Bypass changed a third time when the bog turtle habitat was found to be larger than previously discovered. Delays were also ascribed to the state's political climate. Carroll County is a heavily Republican county in a heavily Democratic state, and until the election of Bob Ehrlich as governor in 2002, the state had not had a Republican governor since Spiro Agnew left office in 1969. Local sentiment was that the county was relatively neglected and did not get its fair share of state highway funding for close to 40 years.

By 1997, the start of construction of the Hampstead Bypass was proposed for three to four years in the future; at that time, most of the engineering phase was complete but most of the highway right-of-way had yet to be purchased. The three-year timeframe was again put forth in 2001. Finally, in 2004, officials announced that the bypass would begin construction in autumn 2005. Construction finally got underway in summer 2006. Houcksville Road's bridge over the bypass and the highway's bridges over Shiloh Road and Indian Run were completed in 2007. The roundabouts at MD 482 and at the southern end of the bypass opened, without connections to the under-construction bypass, in April and May 2009, respectively. The roundabout at the northern end of the bypass opened when the bypass opened to traffic on August 6, 2009. To minimize disruption to the bog turtle habitat, MDSHA installed tunnels under the bypass for the turtles to use and employed goats to consume invasive species in the habitat area near the bypass rather than remove them with mechanical mowers. The old alignment of MD 30 through the center of Hampstead was redesignated MD 30 Business when the bypass opened.

Since as early as 1967, local officials have discussed building a Manchester bypass, either as a separate project or as part of a road bypassing both Hampstead and Manchester. However, by the mid-1970s, the town of Manchester decided it did not want the bypass. The bypass was planned to pass to the west of Manchester, but the town allowed a residential subdivision to be built along the bypass route. The planned bypass route was eventually changed to be east of town. After two decades of disagreement by the town and county over the path of the bypass, in 1993 the bypass was placed in the town's master plan. However, state support for the Manchester bypass was scrapped in 1998 by Smart Growth proponent and governor Parris Glendening, who said the bypass would promote suburban sprawl. The Manchester Bypass is neither in the Maryland Department of Transportation's Consolidated Transportation Program for 2012 to 2017 nor in MDSHA's 2011 Highway Needs Inventory for the next 20 years.

== Junction list ==
County	Location	mi	km	Destinations	Notes
Baltimore	Reisterstown	0.00	0.00	MD 140 (Westminster Road/Main Street) – Westminster, Baltimore	Southern terminus
Baltimore	Reisterstown	0.39	0.63	MD 128 east (Butler Road) / MD 795 south to I-795 (Northwest Expressway) / MD 140 – Baltimore, Westminster, Butler	Western terminus of MD 128; northern terminus of MD 795; MD 795 is unsigned
Baltimore	Upperco	5.20	8.37	MD 91 south (Emory Road) – Finksburg	Northern terminus of MD 91
Carroll	Hampstead	7.87	12.67	MD 30 Bus. north (Hanover Pike) / Phillips Drive south – Hampstead	Roundabout; southern terminus of MD 30 Bus.
Carroll	Hampstead	10.49	16.88	MD 482 (Hampstead–Mexico Road) – Hampstead, Westminster	Roundabout
Carroll	Greenmount	12.30	19.79	MD 30 Bus. south (Hanover Pike) – Hampstead	Roundabout; northern terminus of MD 30 Bus.
Carroll	Manchester	14.72	23.69	MD 27 south (Manchester Road) – Westminster	Northern terminus of MD 27
Carroll	Manchester	15.90	25.59	MD 86 north (Lineboro Road) – Lineboro	Southern terminus of MD 86; no direct access from southbound MD 30 to northbound MD 86
Carroll	Melrose	17.35	27.92	MD 496 west (Bachmans Valley Road) – Westminster	Eastern terminus of MD 496
Carroll		19.16	30.84	PA 94 north (Baltimore Pike) – Hanover	Pennsylvania state line; northern terminus
1.000 mi = 1.609 km; 1.000 km = 0.621 mi: Incomplete access

== Related routes ==
=== Hampstead business route ===
Maryland Route 30 Business
- Location: Hampstead–Greenmount
- Length: 4.00 mi (6.44 km)
- Existed: 2009–present

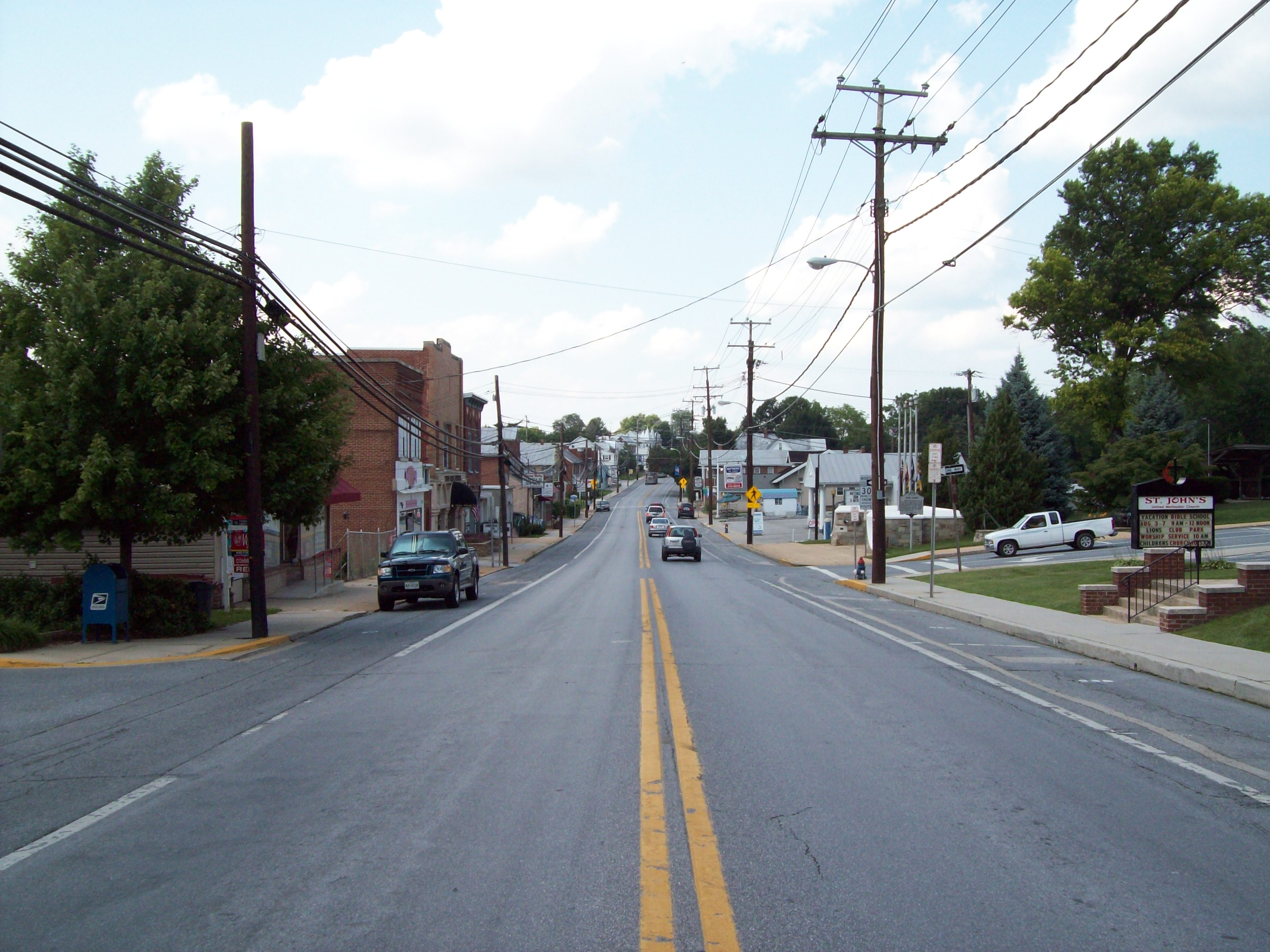
MD 30 northbound in Hampstead on July 27, 2009, ten days before the bypass opened

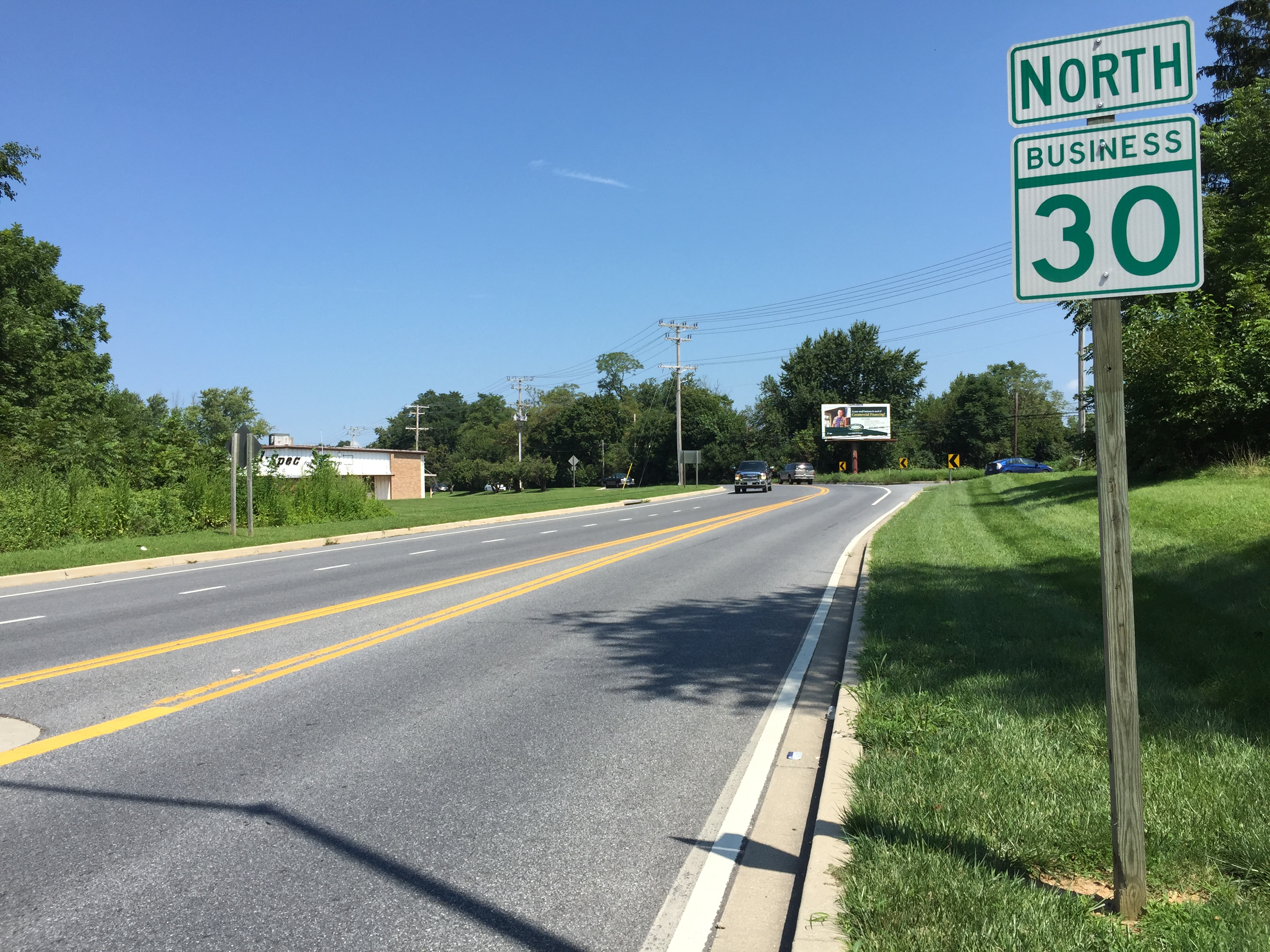
View north from the south end of MD 30 Bus.

Maryland Route 30 Business is a 4.00-mile (6.44 km) business route of MD 30 through Hampstead. The business route begins at a four-leg roundabout with MD 30, which heads south as Hanover Pike and northwest as the Hampstead Bypass, and Phillips Drive. MD 30 Business parallels CSX's Hanover Subdivision through an industrial area that contains the headquarters of JoS. A. Bank Clothiers. The highway's name changes from Hanover Pike to Main Street as it enters the town of Hampstead at an oblique grade crossing of the railroad. At the south end of downtown, MD 30 Business intersects the western ends of MD 88 (Lower Beckleysville Road) and MD 833 (Black Rock Road). Gill Avenue is used to access eastbound MD 833 and the historic Hampstead School. North of downtown, the highway meets the eastern end of MD 482 (Hampstead–Mexico Road) and has another acute grade crossing of the Hanover Subdivision before exiting the town and becoming Hanover Pike again. In the community of Greenmount, the railroad veers away to the northeast and MD 30 Business veers northwest to its northern terminus at a three-leg roundabout with MD 30, which heads southwest as the Hampstead Bypass and north as Hanover Pike toward Manchester. The highway is a part of the National Highway System as a principal arterial from the southern junction with MD 30 to MD 88. MD 30 Business was created on August 6, 2009, along the former alignment of MD 30 through the town after MD 30 was relocated onto the Hampstead Bypass. Now that MD 30 has bypassed Hampstead, a streetscape project is planned to rebuild Main Street through town starting in 2014 or 2015.

Junction list
The entire route is in Carroll County.

Location	mi	km	Destinations	Notes
Hampstead	0.00	0.00	MD 30 (Hampstead Bypass)	Roundabout; southern terminus
Hampstead	1.52	2.45	MD 88 east (Lower Beckleysville Road) to MD 137	Western terminus of MD 88
Hampstead	1.88	3.03	MD 833 east (Old Blackrock Road)	Western terminus of MD 833; one-way westbound, access to eastbound MD 833 provided by Gill Avenue
Hampstead	2.30	3.70	MD 482 west (Hampstead–Mexico Road)	Eastern terminus of MD 482
Greenmount	4.00	6.44	MD 30 (Hampstead Bypass)	Roundabout; northern terminus
1.000 mi = 1.609 km; 1.000 km = 0.621 mi

=== Auxiliary routes ===
MD 30 has two extant auxiliary routes and has had at least two such routes in the past.

- MD 30BC is the designation for the 0.05-mile (0.080 km) connector between MD 30 Business and MD 30BZ in Greenmount just south of the northern end of the Hampstead Bypass. MD 30BC was assigned in 2009 upon the completion of the bypass.
- MD 30BZ is the designation for the 0.15-mile (0.24 km) segment of Hanover Pike from a cul-de-sac north to where the highway turns east into a shopping center in Greenmount just south of the northern end of the Hampstead Bypass. The auxiliary route was part of MD 30 prior to the completion of the bypass in 2009, when the route was assigned.
- MD 30C was the designation of the 0.05-mile (0.080 km) segment of Doss Garland Drive from Phillips Drive to the county-maintained portion of Doss Garland Drive just west of the southern end of the Hampstead Bypass. The highway was assigned upon the completion of the bypass in 2009 and transferred to Carroll County maintenance in 2010.
- MD 30D was the designation for 0.18-mile (0.29 km) segment of Phillips Drive between its roundabout junction with MD 30 and MD 30 Business at the southern end of the Hampstead Bypass south to Wolf Hill Drive. The highway was assigned upon the completion of the bypass in 2009 and transferred to Carroll County maintenance in 2010.
