= Maryland Route 91 =

State highway in Maryland, US

Maryland Route 91
- Maryland Route 91 highlighted in red

Route information
- Maintained by MDSHA
- Length: 7.86 mi (12.65 km)
- Existed: 1927–present

Major junctions
- South end: MD 32 at Gamber
- MD 140 at Finksburg
- North end: MD 30 near Upperco

Location
- Country: United States
- State: Maryland
- Counties: Carroll, Baltimore

Highway system
- Maryland highway system; Interstate; US; State; Scenic Byways
| ← MD 90 | → MD 94 |

Maryland Route 91 (MD 91) is a state highway in the U.S. state of Maryland. The state highway runs 7.86 miles (12.65 km) from MD 32 at Gamber north to MD 30 near Upperco. MD 91 connects southeastern Carroll County and the far western part of Baltimore County south of Hampstead with MD 140 at Finksburg. The state highway was paved at Finksburg in the early 1910s. The remainder of MD 91 was constructed in the mid- to late 1920s.

== Route description ==
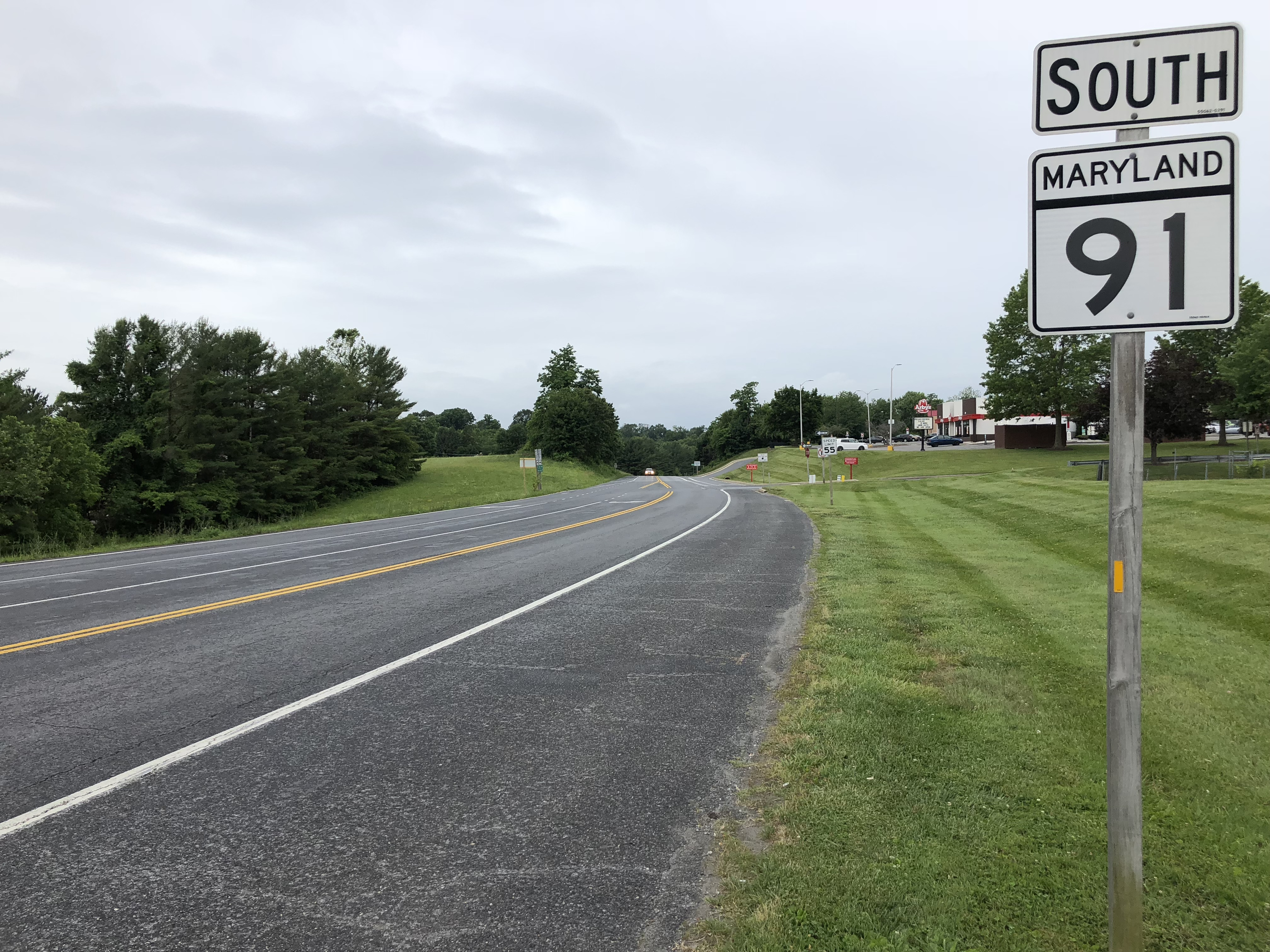
View south along MD 91 at MD 140 in Finksburg

MD 91 begins at an intersection with MD 32 (Sykesville Road) at Gamber. The state highway heads northeast as two-lane undivided Gamber Road through a mix of farmland and scattered residential subdivisions. As MD 91 approaches its crossing of Middle Run, it is paralleled by a stretch of its old alignment, MD 879 (Old Gamber Road). The state highway passes three more pieces of old alignment before crossing Beaver Run and running past the historic farm Cold Saturday. MD 91 parallels another stretch of old alignment, MD 879D (Old Gamber Road), to the west as the highway reaches Finksburg, where it intersects MD 140 (Baltimore Boulevard). There is no left turn allowed from southbound MD 140 to northbound MD 91; that movement is made via a jughandle adjacent to Finksburg Plaza Shopping Center. MD 91 continues northeast as Emory Road and receives the northern end of MD 879D (Cedarhurst Road) just before the mainline highway crosses over the North Branch of the Patapsco River and the Maryland Midland Railway. To the north of the bridge is the final section of old alignment, a spur into an industrial park. MD 91 passes the road's namesake, Emory United Methodist Church, just before entering Baltimore County. The state highway reaches its northern terminus at MD 30 (Hanover Pike) at the hamlet of Fowblesburg to the south of the village of Upperco. Emory Road continues east as a county highway a short distance to Old Hanover Road, which leads south to Boring.

MD 91 is a part of the National Highway System as a principal arterial from MD 32 at Gamber north to MD 140 in Finksburg.

== History ==
The Gamber–Finksburg portion of MD 91 was originally a turnpike called the Mechanicsville and Finksburg Turnpike, which later became one of the branches of the Baltimore and Reisterstown Turnpike. The first section of modern road built along the highway was a 14-foot (4.3 m) macadam road from the Western Maryland Railway (now Maryland Midland Railway) south to near Beaver Run. A concrete road was laid in two segments from Gamber toward Finksburg in 1923 and 1924. The gap between MD 32 and U.S. Route 140 (now MD 140) was filled in 1928. MD 91 was paved in concrete from both the railroad north of Finkaburg and Fowblesburg beginning in 1926. The segment between MD 30 and the Baltimore–Carroll county line was completed in 1927. The final piece of MD 91 between Finksburg and the county line was finished in 1929. MD 91 was relocated in several spots between Finksburg and the rail line around 1968. The bypassed portions of the highway became segments of MD 879.

== Junction list ==
| County | Location | mi | km | Destinations | Notes |
|---|---|---|---|---|---|
| Carroll | Gamber | 0.00 | 0.00 | MD 32 (Sykesville Road) – Eldersburg, Westminster | Southern terminus |
| Carroll | Finksburg | 3.21 | 5.17 | MD 140 (Baltimore Boulevard) – Westminster, Reisterstown | |
| Baltimore | Upperco | 7.86 | 12.65 | MD 30 (Hanover Pike) – Hampstead, Reisterstown | Northern terminus |
1.000 mi = 1.609 km; 1.000 km = 0.621 mi

== Auxiliary route ==
MD 91A was the designation for unnamed 0.01-mile (0.016 km) connector between MD 91 and MD 879A near Gamber. The road was removed in 2012.
