= Camp Stoneman (Washington, D.C.) =

U.S. Army facility in Washington, D.C.

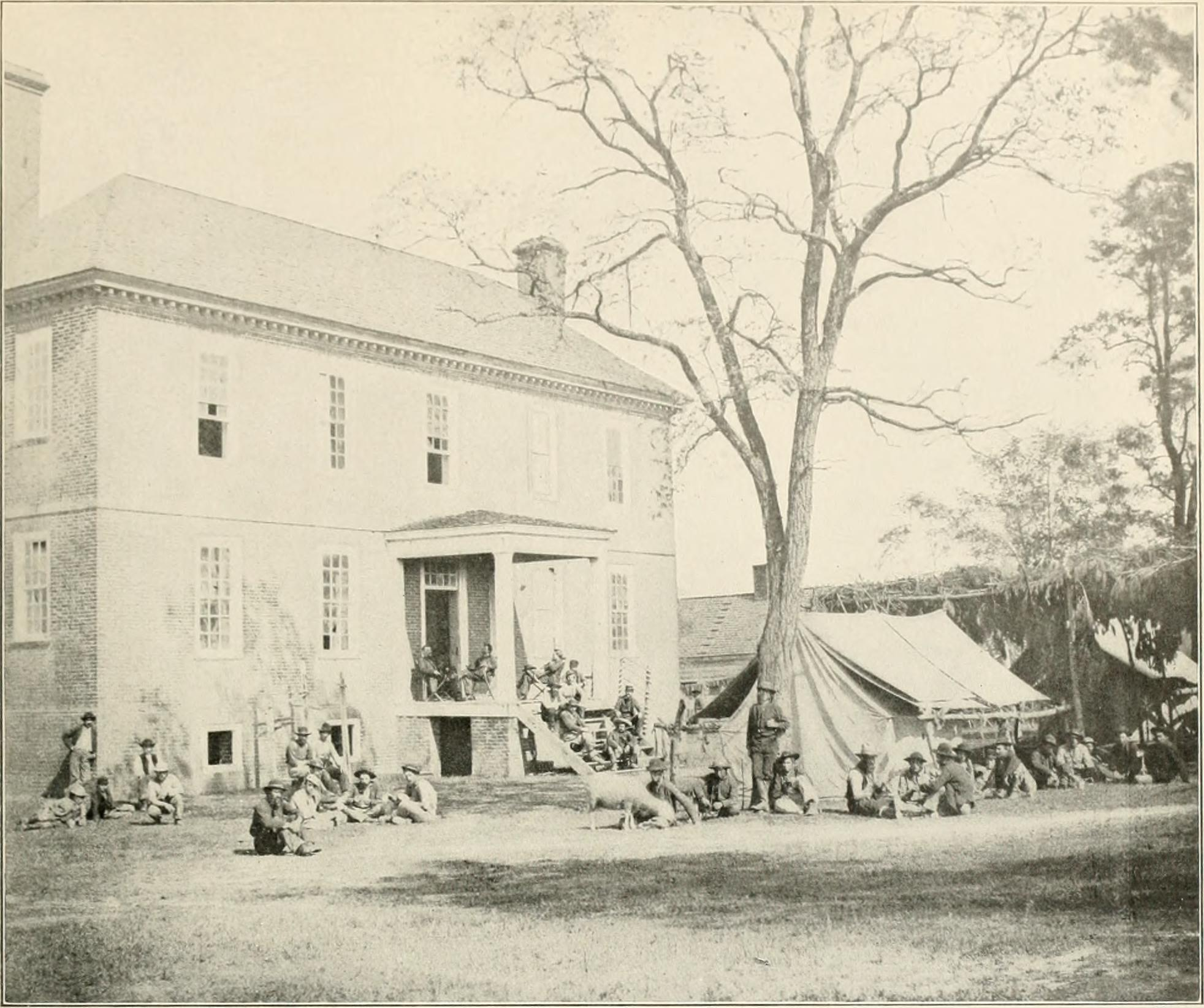
Cavalry stationed at Giesboro during the Civil War

Camp Stoneman was a United States Army military facility located in Washington, D.C., during the American Civil War. It served as the Dismounted Camp for the cavalry forces of the Army of the Potomac from September 1863 to December 1864.

Named after George Stoneman, a cavalry commander during the Civil War, the camp was established adjacent to the Giesboro Cavalry Depot in September, 1863 after moving from Camp Davis in Alexandria, Virginia. In December 1864, the Camp moved to Pleasant Valley, Maryland, but the depot and hospitals remained and people continued to refer to the area as Camp Stoneman. The area is now occupied by the Department of Defense's Joint Base Bolling-Anacostia.

In 1865, after the war was over, William McKinley, then a Captain in the Army, was stationed there.
