= Taylor-Manning-Leppo House =

Historic house in Maryland, United States

- U.S. National Register of Historic Places
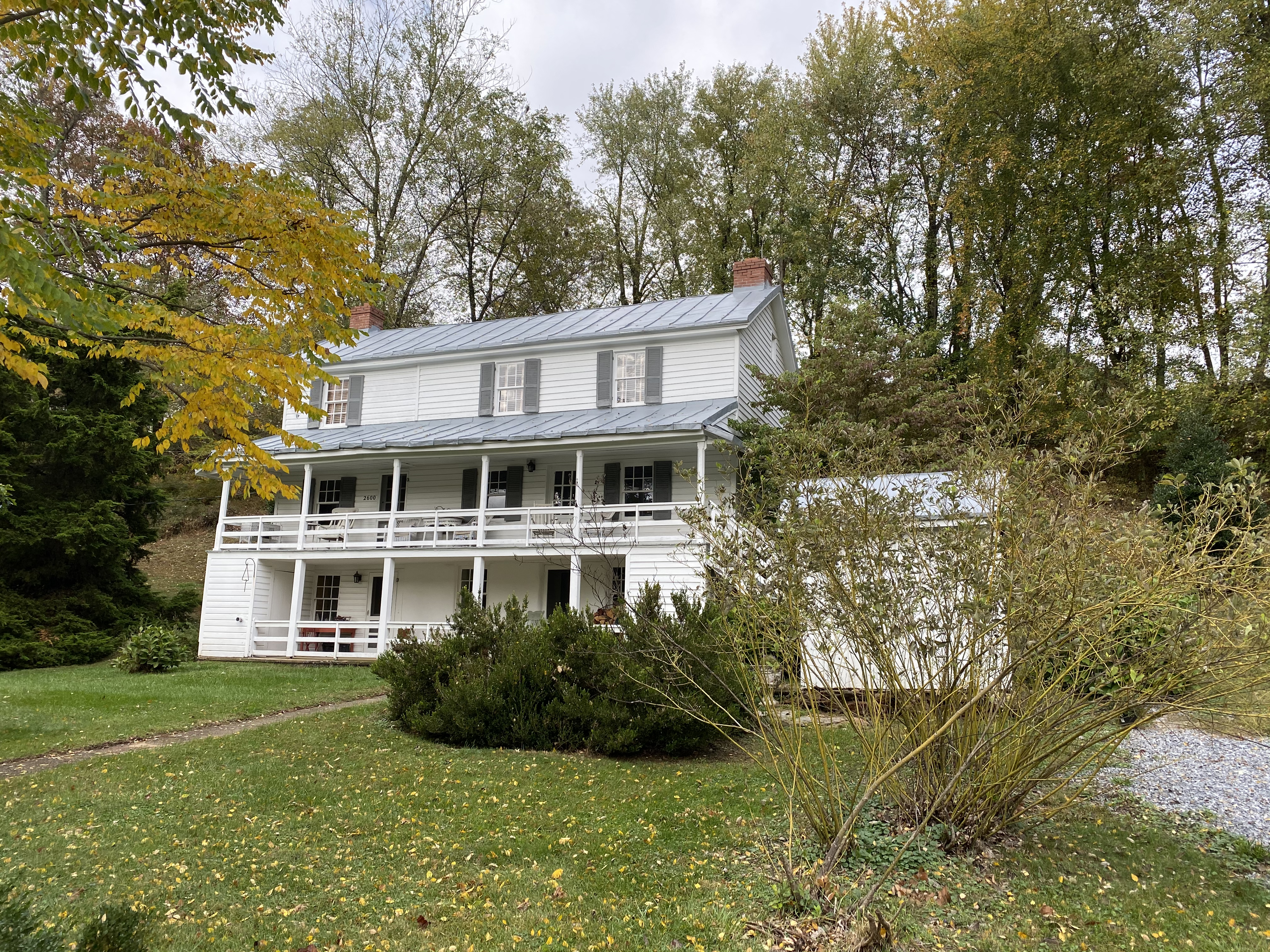

- Location within Maryland Location within the United States
- Location: 2600 Patapsco Rd., near Finksburg, Maryland
- Coordinates: 39°32′35.6″N 76°54′15.4″W
- Area: 1.6 acres (0.65 ha)
- Built: 1860
- Architectural style: Log and frame bank house
- NRHP reference No.: 09000519
- Added to NRHP: July 15, 2009

Taylor-Manning-Leppo House is a historic home located near Finksburg, Carroll County, Maryland. The original section was built about 1860, and is a 2 ½-story log and frame bank house. It rests on a stone foundation, with an exposed full story in height across the front of the building.

It was listed on the National Register of Historic Places in 2009.
