= Gamber, Maryland =

Unincorporated community in Maryland, United States

- Unincorporated community
- Location within the state of Maryland Gamber (the United States)
- Coordinates: 39°27′53″N 76°56′02″W
- Country: United States
- State: Maryland
- County: Carroll
- Time zone: UTC-5 (Eastern (EST))
  - Summer (DST): UTC-4 (EDT)

Gamber is an unincorporated community located in Carroll County, Maryland, United States. Gamber is located at the intersection of Maryland routes 32 and 91, near the border of Carroll and Baltimore counties. It is an unincorporated area approximately four miles northwest of the Liberty Reservoir and six miles southeast of Westminster.

== Transportation ==
The Owings Mills station of the Baltimore Metro SubwayLink in nearby Owings Mills, Baltimore County, is a 15-minute drive by car from Carrolltowne and provides subway access to downtown Baltimore.

There is no bus link between Gamber/Eldersburg and nearby Randallstown in Baltimore County, in part due to longstanding opposition to inter-county public transit from Carroll County officials and residents.
