= Otis Stocksdale =

American baseball player and coach (1871–1933)

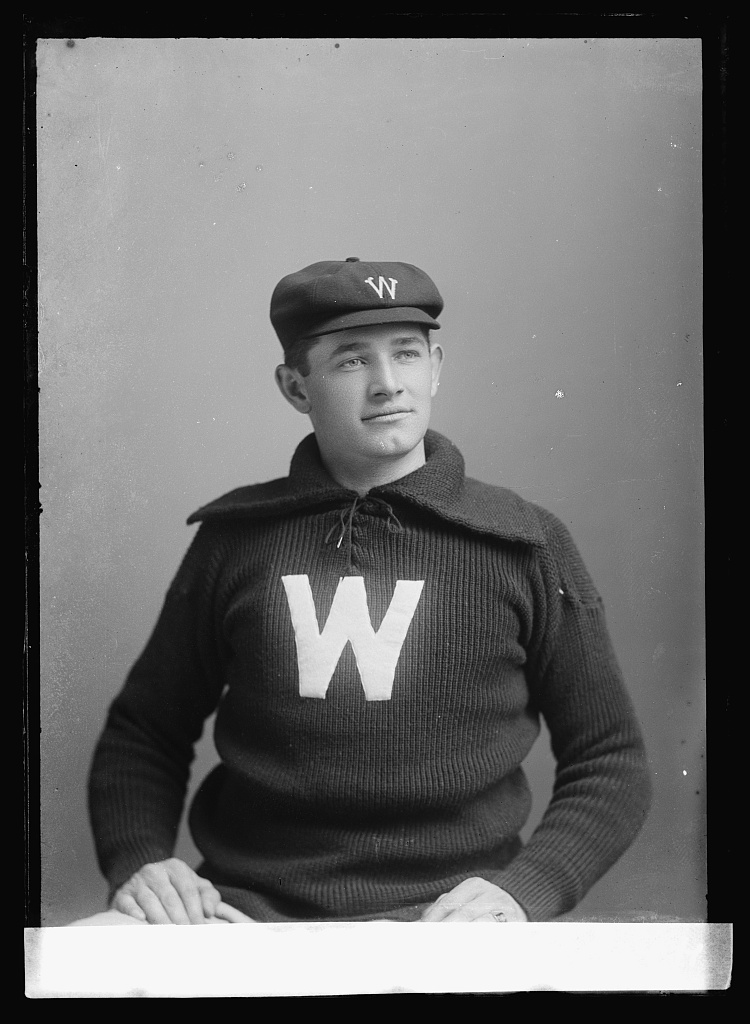
- Stocksdale photographed by C. M. Bell Studios
- Pitcher
- Born: August 7, 1871 near Arcadia, Maryland, U.S.
- Died: March 15, 1933 (aged 61); Pennsville, New Jersey, U.S.
- Batted: Left Threw: Right

MLB debut
- July 24, 1893, for the Washington Senators

Last MLB appearance
- May 2, 1896, for the Baltimore Orioles

MLB statistics
- Win–loss record: 15–31
- Earned run average: 6.20
- Strikeouts: 48
- Stats at Baseball Reference

Teams
- Washington Senators (1893–1895); Boston Beaneaters (1895); Baltimore Orioles (1896)

Career highlights and awards
- National League pennant (1896)

Otis Hinkley Stocksdale (August 7, 1871 – March 15, 1933) was an American professional baseball player who played four seasons for the Washington Senators, Boston Beaneaters and Baltimore Orioles. He pitched in the minor leagues after that until 1912. He coached for the University of North Carolina at Chapel Hill and the Lynchburg Shoemakers He was born in Arcadia, Maryland, and died in Pennsville, New Jersey, at the age of 61.

== Early life ==
Otis Hinkley Stocksdale was born on August 7, 1871, at the Stocksdale homestead near Arcadia, Maryland, to Kesiah (née Cole) and George L. Stocksdale. He pitched for the Johns Hopkins University baseball team. He was a right-handed pitcher and a left-handed batter.

== Career ==
Stocksdale pitched for a team in Towson. In 1893, he pitched for Wilkes–Barre. In 1894, he pitched for the Washington Senators. In 1895, he played for the Boston Beaneaters and he pitched for the Baltimore Orioles in 1896. He also pitched for a baseball team in Chicago. In 1897, he managed a baseball team in Boston. He also played for a team in Richmond, Virginia, and a team in Raleigh, North Carolina. In 1902, he managed the Trinity College baseball team in Durham, North Carolina.

In the summer of 1903, he joined with the Montgomery Black Sox. He also pitched for the Memphis Egyptians, the Mobile Sea Gulls and the Birmingham Barons. In 1908, he was a coach for the University of North Carolina at Chapel Hill baseball team. Stocksdale was announced as manager of the Greensboro club of the Carolina Association for their 1911 season, but instead became coach of the Lynchburg Shoemakers of the Virginia League. He continued coaching until 1912. In 1912, he was an umpire in the Southern League. In 1914, he coached the Virginia Christian College. He went by the nickname "Grey Fox" (or "The Old Gray Fox") and the "Colonel".

== Personal life ==
Stocksdale married Nannie Lee Bowen, daughter of Joseph Bowen, of Towson on June 19, 1901. He had three sons and two daughters.

Stocksdale died following heart trouble on March 15, 1933, at his home in Pennsville, New Jersey. He was buried at St. Paul's Cemetery in Arcadia, Maryland.
