= Christian Royer House =

Historic house in Maryland, United States

- U.S. National Register of Historic Places
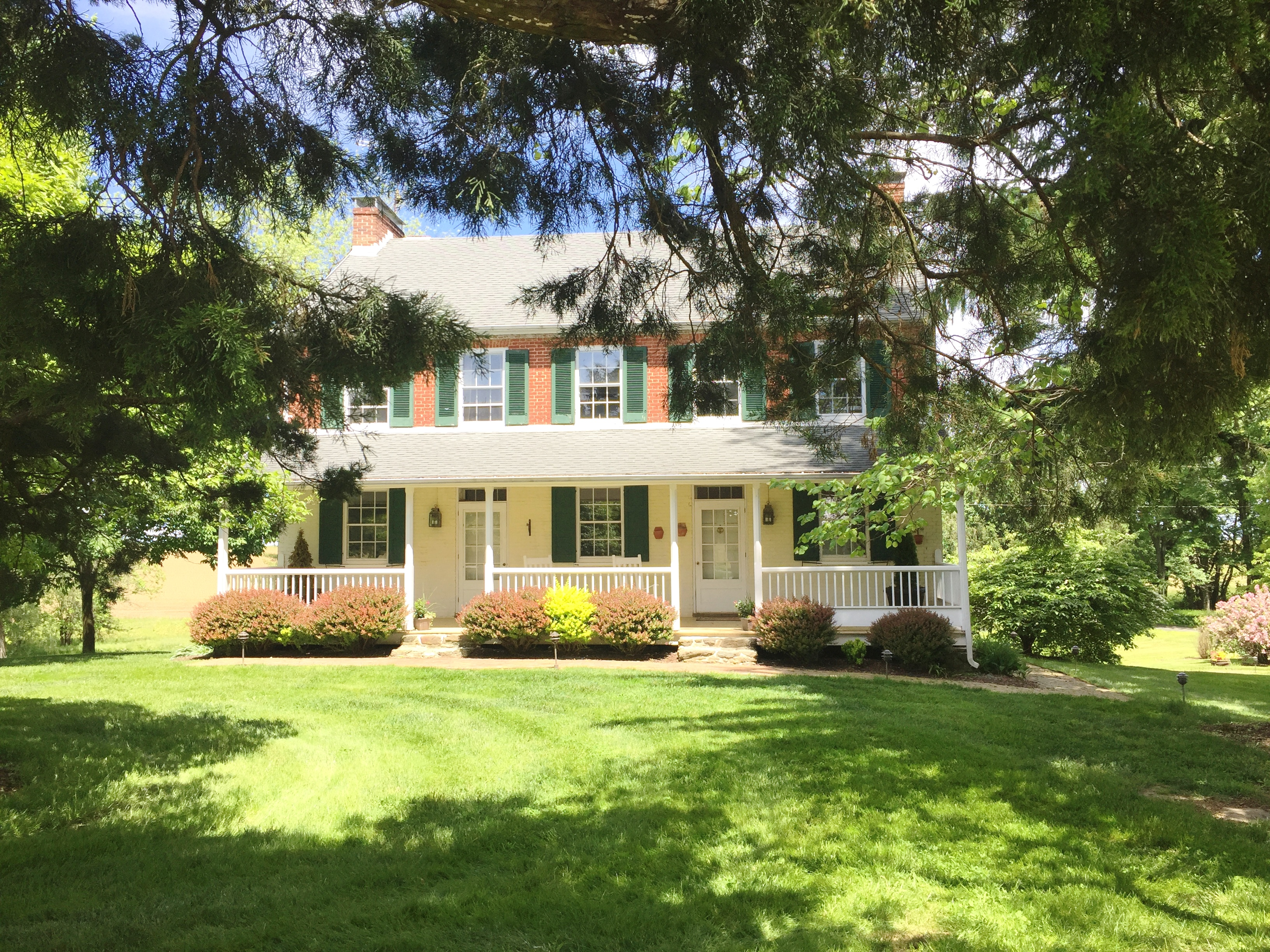

- Location within Maryland Location within the United States
- Location: 817 Fridinger Mill Road, Westminster, Maryland
- Coordinates: 39°37′32″N 76°57′57″W
- Area: 3 acres (1.2 ha)
- Built: 1828
- NRHP reference No.: 79001119
- Added to NRHP: November 7, 1979

The Christian Royer House is a historic home located at Westminster, Carroll County, Maryland, United States. It was built about 1828, and served dual functions as a farmhouse and a Church of the Brethren meeting house. The house is two stories of brick, with a five-bay by two-bay main section and a three-bay long central rear wing. The rear wing features a double-tiered inset porch on both sides in the two bays adjoining the main section of the house. Also on the property are a late 19th-century corn crib and a large 20th-century barn. The features distinguishing this as a meeting house are the double entrance on the main facade, the folding wood-panel partition walls that open to provide single large space and the extensive kitchen facilities.

The Christian Royer House was listed on the National Register of Historic Places in 1979.
