= Carrolltowne, Maryland =

Unincorporated community in Maryland, United States

- Unincorporated community
- Location within the state of Maryland Carrolltowne (the United States)
- Coordinates: 39°23′27″N 76°55′49″W
- Country: United States
- State: Maryland
- County: Carroll
- Time zone: UTC−5 (Eastern (EST))
  - Summer (DST): UTC−4 (EDT)

Carrolltowne is an unincorporated community in Carroll County, Maryland, United States.

== Transportation ==
The Owings Mills station of the Baltimore Metro SubwayLink in nearby Owings Mills, Baltimore County, is a 15-minute drive by car from Carrolltowne and provides subway access to downtown Baltimore.

There is no bus link between Carrolltowne/Eldersburg and nearby Randallstown in Baltimore County, in part due to longstanding opposition to inter-county public transit from Carroll County officials and residents.
