= Mayberry, Maryland =

Unincorporated community in Maryland, U.S.

Coordinates: 39°38′26″N 77°05′58″W

Mayberry is an unincorporated community in Carroll County, Maryland, United States. It is served by the Westminster post office, and has the ZIP Code of 21158.
