= Reisterstown Historic District =

Historic district in Maryland, United States

- U.S. National Register of Historic Places
- U.S. Historic district
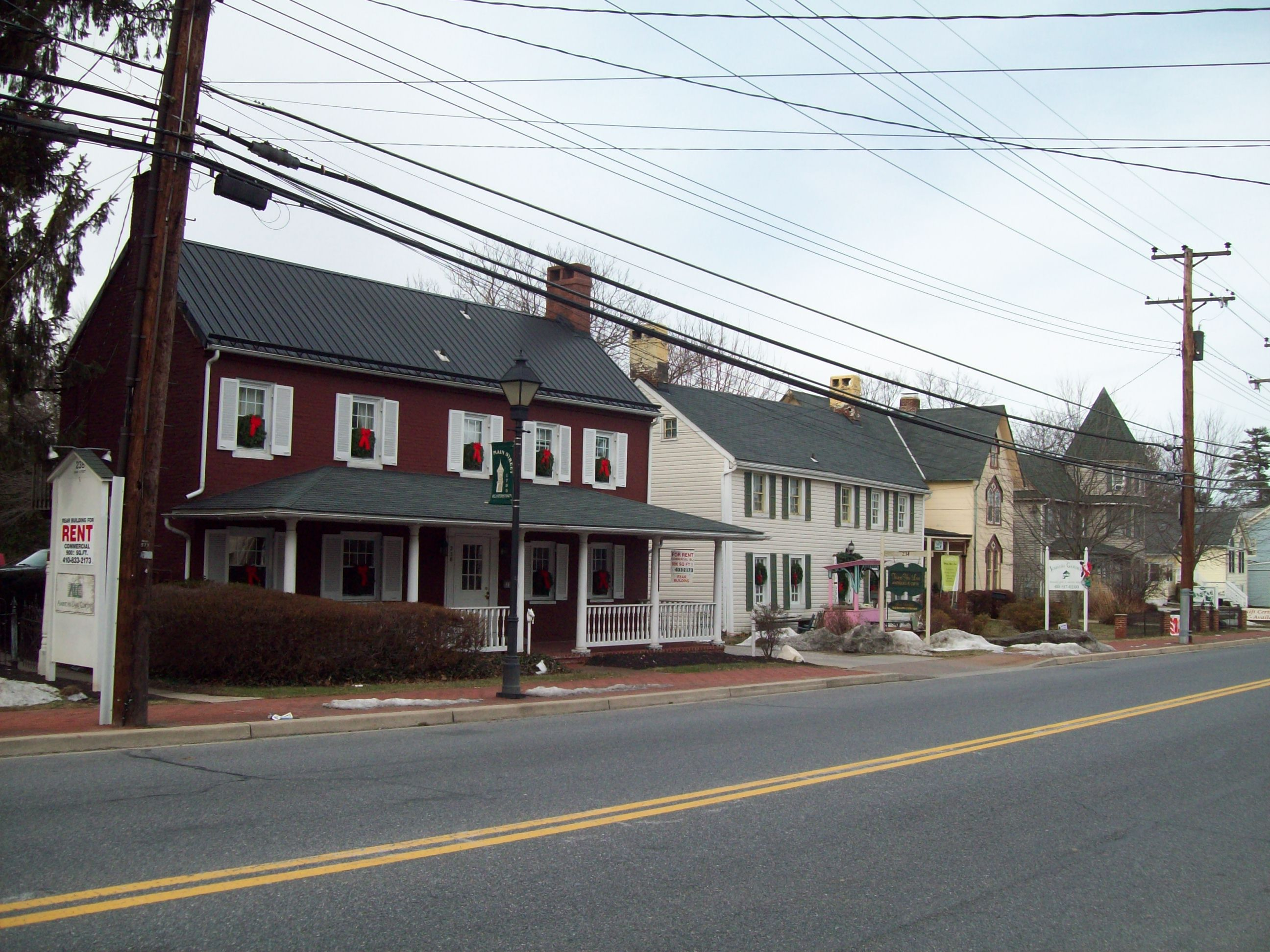
- Reisterstown Road, Reisterstown Historic District, December 2009

- Location within Maryland Location within the United States
- Location: U.S. 140 and MD 30, Reisterstown, Maryland
- Coordinates: 39°27′49″N 76°49′32″W
- Area: 154 acres (62 ha)
- Built: 1758
- Architectural style: Late Victorian
- NRHP reference No.: 79001118
- Added to NRHP: November 15, 1979

Reisterstown Historic District is a national historic district in Reisterstown, Baltimore County, Maryland, United States. Its development is inseparably identified with the roads that converge to form Main Street. They are Maryland Route 30 and Maryland Route 140. The earliest structures, including several of log, date to the late 18th century, although the town was founded in 1758. It developed as a convenient stopping place for weary travelers from the outer reaches of Western Maryland or Pennsylvania and many businesses catered to the traveler: including taverns and inns, smithshops, saddleries, stables, waggoners.

It was added to the National Register of Historic Places in 1979.
