= Gaither, Maryland =

Unincorporated community in Maryland, U.S.

Coordinates: 39°21′41″N 76°59′35″W

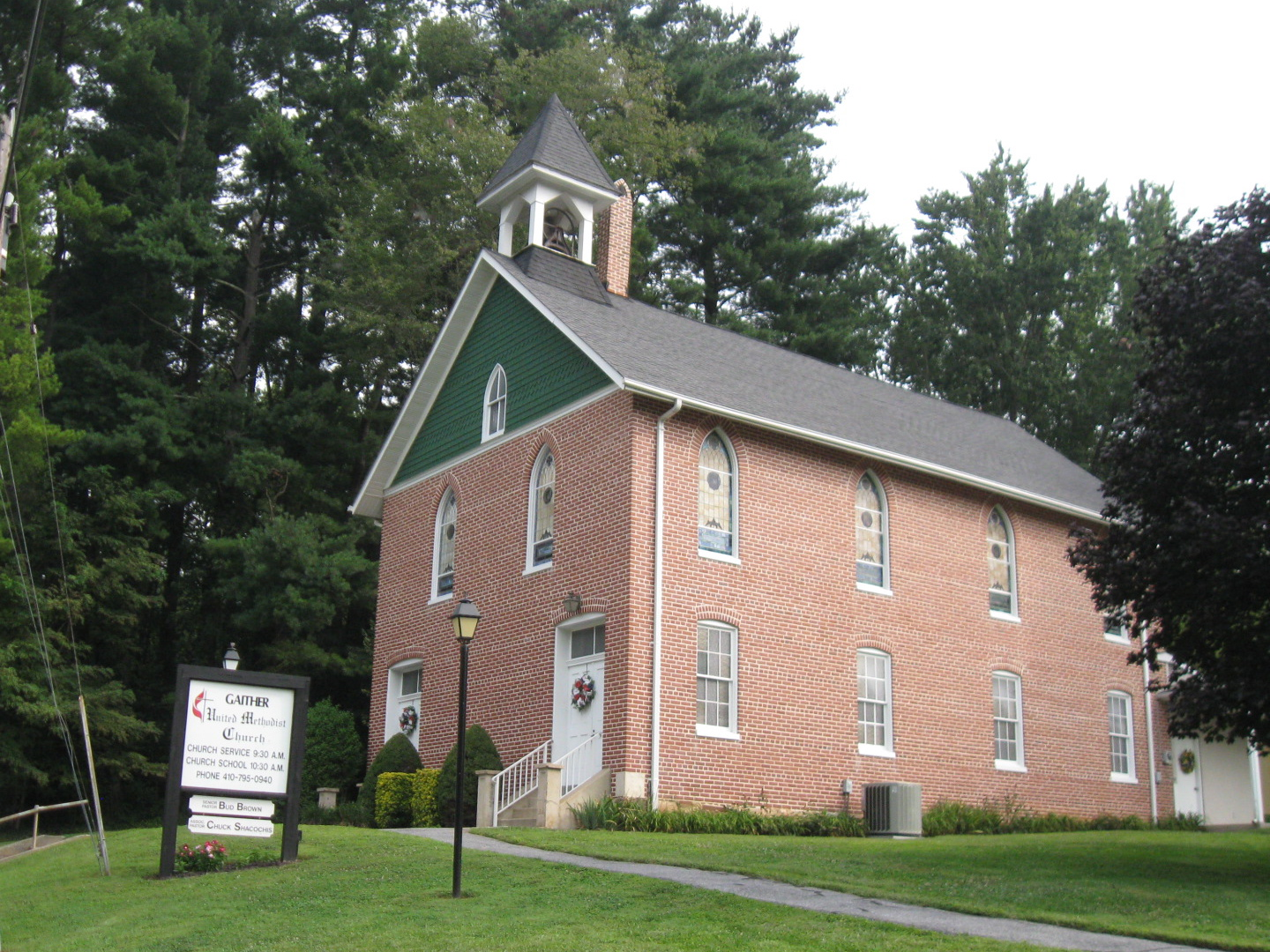
Gaither United Methodist Church

Gaither is an unincorporated community in Carroll County, Maryland, United States. It is located along Gaither Road, just north of the South Branch of the Patapsco River and the Old Main Line railroad line of CSX Transportation.
