= Melrose, Maryland =

Unincorporated community in Maryland, United States

- Unincorporated
- Location within Maryland
- Coordinates: 39°41′23″N 76°53′52″W
- Country: United States
- State: Maryland
- County: Carroll
- Elevation: 801 ft (244 m)
- Time zone: UTC-5 (Eastern (EST))
  - Summer (DST): UTC-4 (EDT)
- Area codes: 410 & 443
- GNIS feature ID: 590787

Melrose is an unincorporated community in Carroll County, Maryland, United States. Melrose is located on Maryland Route 30, 2.1 miles (3.4 km) north-northwest of Manchester.

== History ==
Melrose used to be a small town, with a train track running in its center. The town also had its own post office and zip code. The community still has a small gas station, liquor store and general store called Piper's, and another gas station. The community contains a Used Car Station and mini storage called Melrose Mini Storage.
