= John Orendorff Farm =

- U.S. National Register of Historic Places
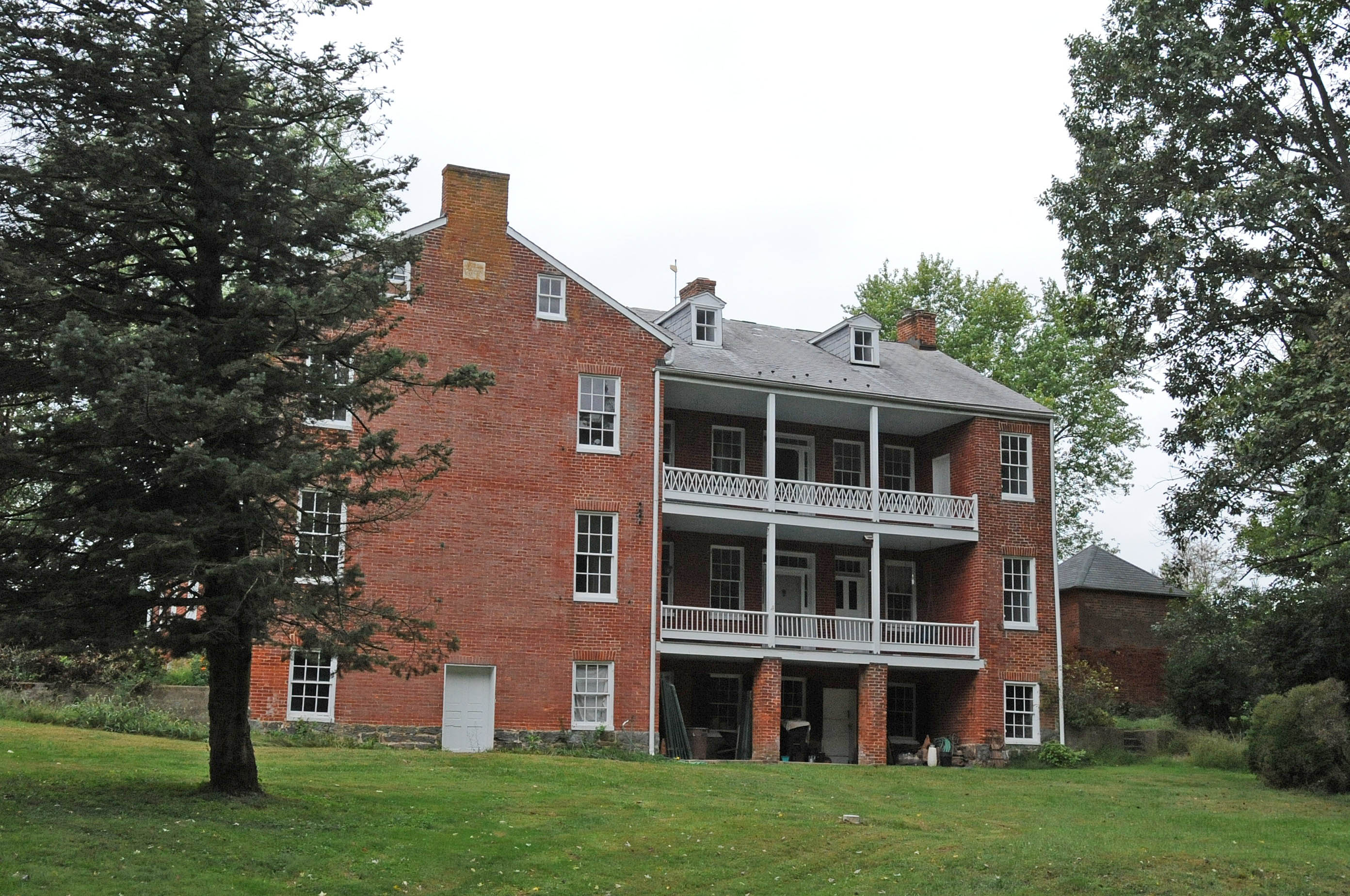

- Location within Maryland Location within the United States
- Location: 412 Old Bachman's Valley Road, Westminster, Maryland
- Coordinates: 39°37′4″N 76°59′16″W
- Area: 31.6 acres (12.8 ha)
- Built: 1861
- Architectural style: Italianate
- NRHP reference No.: 97000102
- Added to NRHP: March 7, 1997

The John Orendorff Farm is a historic home and farm complex located at Westminster, Carroll County, Maryland, United States. The complex consists of a brick house, a brick privy, a brick smokehouse, a frame barn, a frame hog pen, a frame wagon shed, two poultry houses, and a feed house. The house is a five-by-two-bay brick structure, built in 1861 in the Italianate style. It has a 2 1/2-story, six-by-two-bay brick ell on the north side.

The John Orendorff Farm was listed on the National Register of Historic Places in 1997.
