= Cold Saturday =

Historic house in Maryland, United States

- U.S. National Register of Historic Places
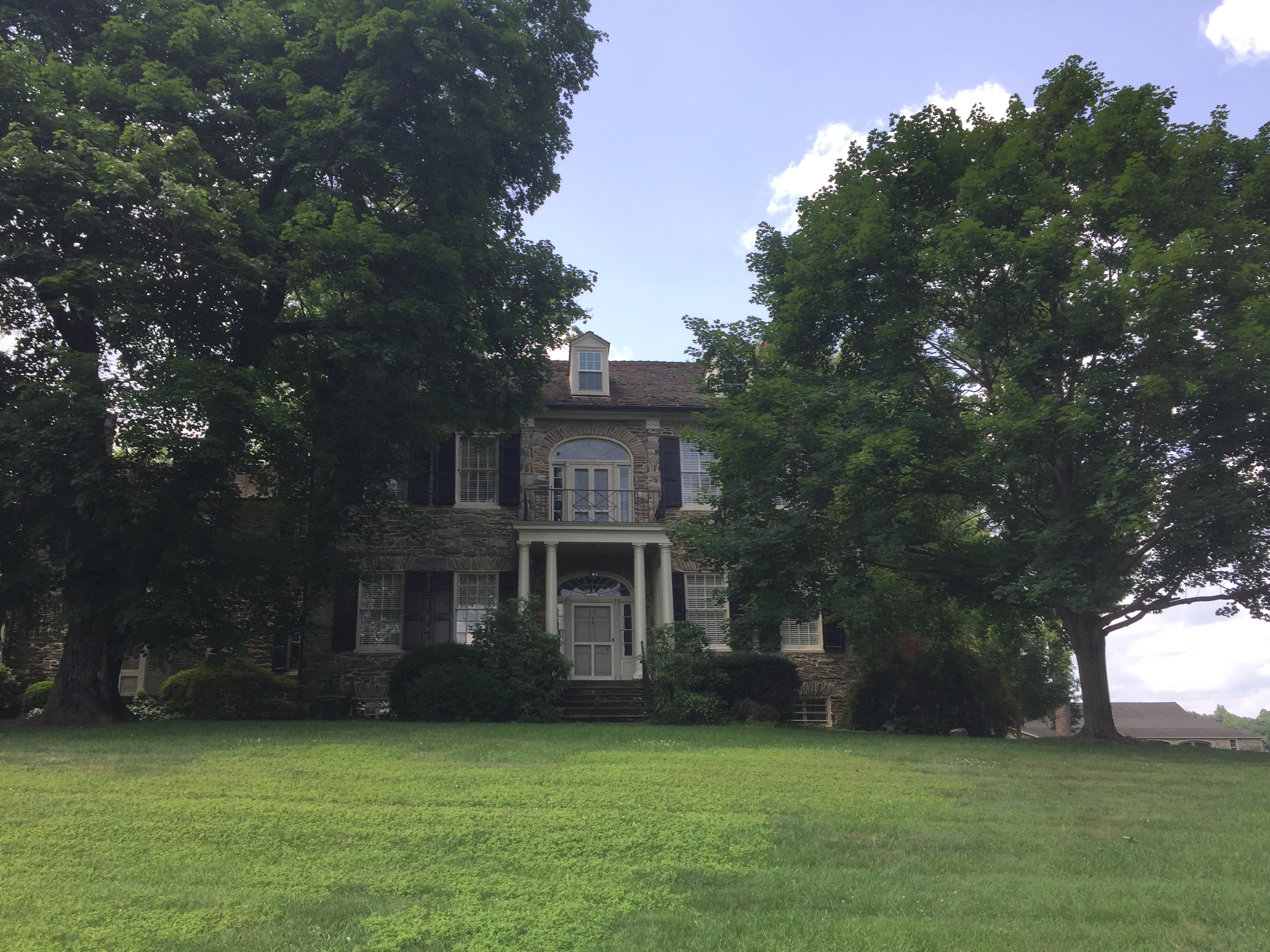

- Location within Maryland Location within the United States
- Location: 3251 Gamber Rd., near Finksburg, Maryland
- Coordinates: 39°29′03.4″N 76°54′4″W
- Area: 11.6 acres (4.7 ha)
- Built: 1800
- Architectural style: Federal
- NRHP reference No.: 08001174
- Added to NRHP: December 11, 2008

Cold Saturday, or Cold Saturday Farm, is a historic home and farm complex located near Finksburg, Carroll County, Maryland. The house is significant for embodying the characteristics of Anglo-American gentry farms that are common in the Tidewater region.

It was listed on the National Register of Historic Places in 2008.
