= Upperco, Maryland =

Unincorporated community in Maryland, United States

- Unincorporated community
- Location within the State of Maryland Upperco, Maryland (the United States)
- Coordinates: 39°33′46″N 76°50′07″W
- Country: United States
- State: Maryland
- County: Baltimore
- Time zone: UTC-5 (Eastern (EST))
  - Summer (DST): UTC-4 (EDT)
- ZIP code: 21155
- Area codes: 410,443 and 667

Upperco (formerly known as Arcadia) is an unincorporated community in Baltimore and Carroll counties, Maryland, United States. The population as of the 2000 census for zip code 21155, part of which covers Upperco, was 2349. It is adjacent to Maryland Route 30, between the much larger towns of Reistertown and Hampstead.

The community's fairground is home to several annual public events, such as shows held by the Maryland Steam Historical Society—featuring steam engines, antique cars, tractor pulls, and a flea market—and fundraising events for the local volunteer fire company, including a demolition derby, bluegrass music festival, and yuletide village.

In 2017, the Arcadia Volunteer Fire Company was consolidated with the Boring Volunteer Fire Company of Boring, Maryland, located two miles away, due to both companies struggling to fully staff their operations. Now known as the Upperco Voluntary Fire Company, members began operating out of the old Arcadia location, pending the construction of a new facility at a nearby location. The U.V.F.C. broke ground on the new facility in July 2021, with a budget of $8 million.

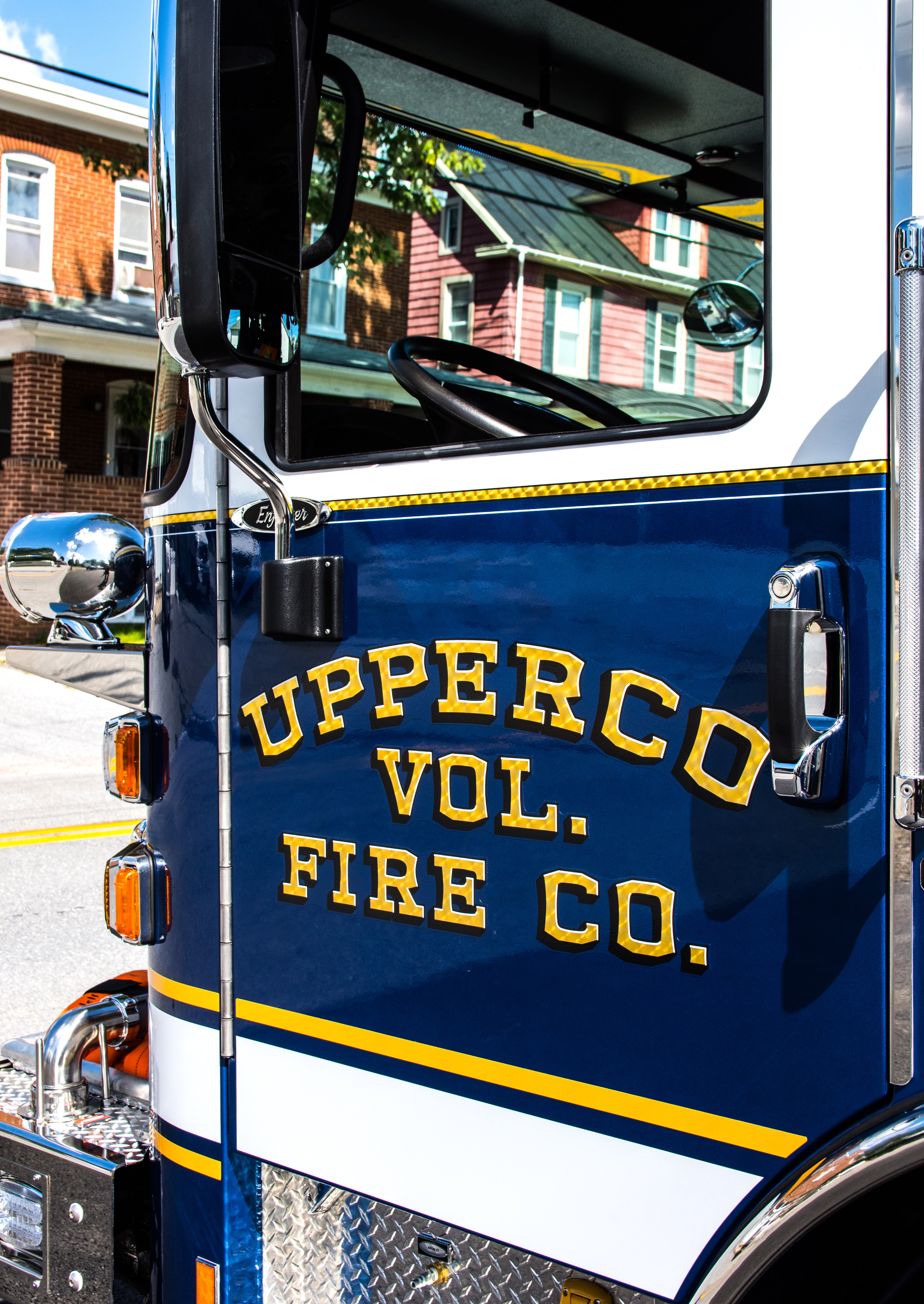
An Upperco Volunteer Fire Company fire engine.

== Notable persons ==
- Ben Carson, surgeon and politician
- Otis Stocksdale, Major League Baseball pitcher

== In media ==
- CBS television series Joan of Arcadia, which ran from 2003 to 2005, was set in a fictionalized version of Arcadia/Upperco.
