= Greenmount, Maryland =

Unincorporated community in Maryland, United States

- Unincorporated community
- Location within the state of Maryland Greenmount (the United States)
- Coordinates: 39°37′52″N 76°51′45″W
- Country: United States
- State: Maryland
- County: Caroll
- Time zone: UTC-5 (Eastern (EST))
  - Summer (DST): UTC-4 (EDT)

Greenmount is an unincorporated community in Carroll County, Maryland, United States.
