= Finksburg, Maryland =

Unincorporated community in Maryland, United States

- Unincorporated community
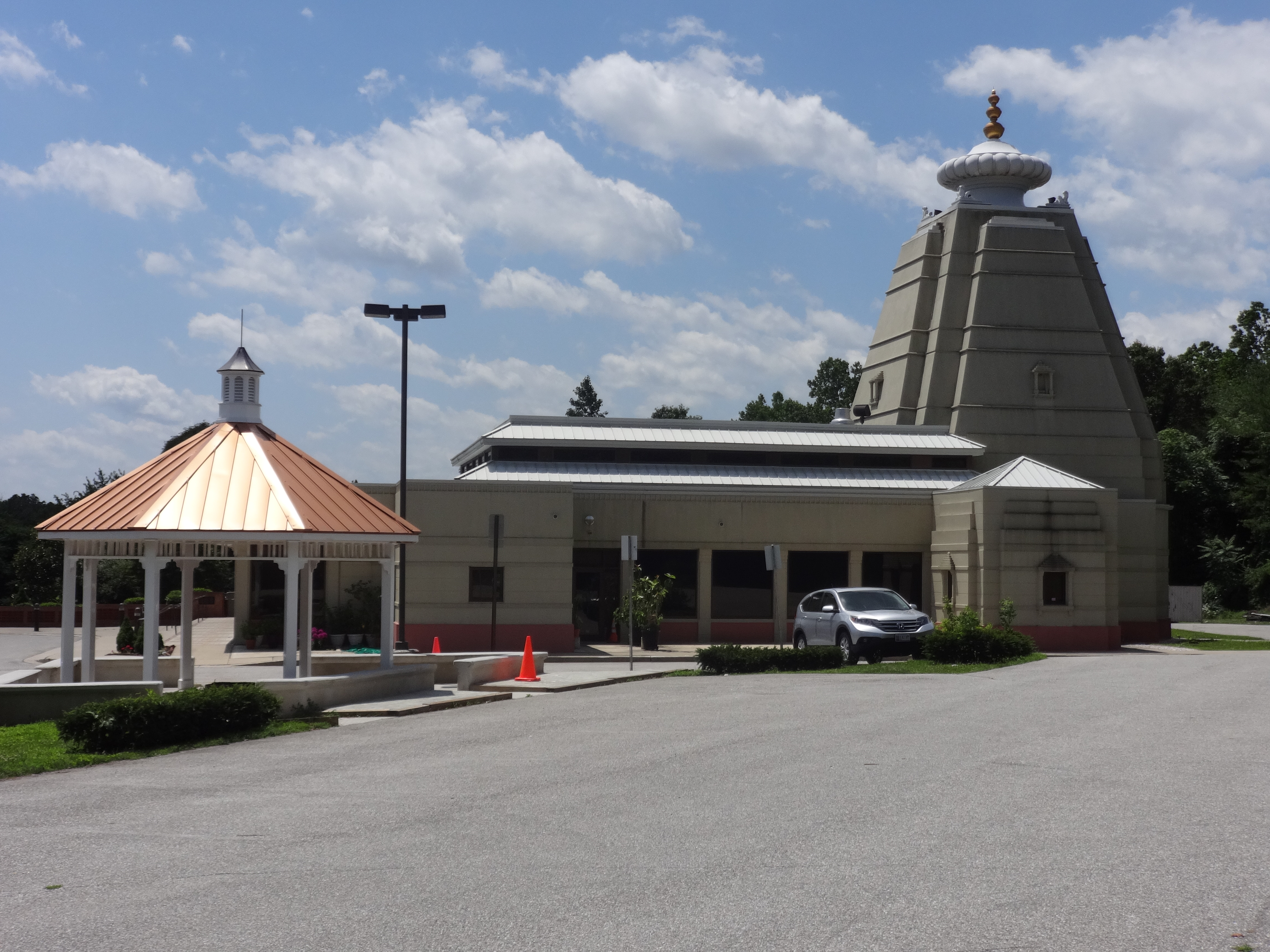
- Greater Baltimore Hindu-Jain Temple

- Location within the state of Maryland Finksburg (the United States)
- Coordinates: 39°29′34″N 76°53′22″W
- Country: United States
- State: Maryland
- County: Carroll
- Elevation: 564 ft (172 m)
- Time zone: UTC-5 (Eastern (EST))
  - Summer (DST): UTC-4 (EDT)
- ZIP code: 21048
- Area codes: 410 and 443 and 667
- GNIS ID: 584378

Finksburg is an unincorporated community in Carroll County, Maryland, United States. It is the location of the National Security Agency's EKMS Central Facility. Finksburg is located at the intersection of Maryland Routes 91 and 140, on the border of Carroll and Baltimore counties. It is approximately one mile northwest of the Liberty Reservoir and six miles southeast of Westminster.

Finksburg is named after Adam Fink, who built the first house and was owner of a local tavern and toll road in the early 19th century.

== Modern day ==
The Finksburg community is protected by the Gamber and Reese Community Volunteer Fire Stations, as well as Sykesville-Freedom District Fire Department.

The area is served by Sandymount Elementary, Shiloh Middle, and Westminster High Schools. Gerstell Academy, an independent K-12 school is also located in Finksburg. Across the street sits the 13,805 sq. ft. Finksburg Branch of the Carroll County Public Library which opened in 2009 and "was the first green building in Carroll County".

Finksburg is host to the Roaring Run Community Park, a small sports complex with four baseball diamonds, as well as Sandymount Park which features walking paths, tennis courts, a basketball court, playground, three baseball diamonds, and six grass athletic fields. The Greater Baltimore Hindu-Jain Temple and the Evergreen Memorial Gardens cemetery are located in Finksburg.

Yearly, the Baltimore Ravens training camp hosts practice in Owings Mills, several miles away. Former Ravens players Torrey Smith and Haloti Ngata lived locally.

== Transportation ==
The Owings Mills station of the Baltimore Metro SubwayLink in nearby Owings Mills, Baltimore County, is a 15-minute drive by car from Finksburg and provides subway access to downtown Baltimore.

== History ==
- 1838 - Finksburg becomes a part of the newly created Carroll County Maryland following an act of the 1837 Maryland Legislature from portions of Baltimore County and Frederick County. The County is named after the last surviving signer of the Declaration of Independence who died in 1836 Charles Carroll of Carollton.
- 1849 – Edward Remington and the Patapsco Mining Company opened cobalt mines near Finksburg
- 1855 – Western Maryland Railroad reached Finksburg
- 1856 – A. L. Hoover was postmaster of Finksburg, earning $63.60 for the year
- 1858 – Cobalt mining was unprofitable and mines were closed for financial reasons
- 1866 – Baseball was the most popular sport, the "Star" of Finksburg was the local club (team)
- 1873 – The Alpha Farmers' Club of Carroll County was established
- 1881 – The Finksburg Literary Society organized lecturers for Friday night meetings at the Mechanics' Hall. Admission was 5 cents.
- 1888 – L. A. J. Lamotte operated a business for canning corn
- 1913 - The Western Maryland Railroad changes the name of their Finksburg station to "Asbestos" in respect for the nearby Baltimore Roofing and Asbestos Company, to the consternation of local residents. This led to the area by the station, a half mile from town, being called Asbestos, Maryland at least into the 1930s, over a decade after the asbestos plant closed. (This area is now called "Cedarhurst".)
- 1935 – Sandymount Elementary School began as a three-room stone building consolidating the smaller one room schools of Reese, Bethel, and Sandymount Finksburg, Emory School house Patapsco School house and East View School house Deer Park
- 2002 – Independent K-12 school Gerstell Academy opens

Timeline information generally taken from: Warner, Nancy, Ralph Levering and Margaret Taylor Woltz. Carroll County Maryland: A History 1837–1976. Carroll County Bicentennial Committee, 1976.

Cold Saturday was listed on the National Register of Historic Places in 2008. The Taylor-Manning-Leppo House was listed in 2009.
