= Pleasant Valley, Carroll County, Maryland =

Unincorporated community in Maryland, United States

Pleasant Valley, Maryland
- Unincorporated community
- Location within the state of Maryland Pleasant Valley (the United States)
- Coordinates: 39°37′59″N 77°02′46″W
- Country: United States
- State: Maryland
- County: Caroll
- Time zone: UTC-5 (Eastern (EST))
  - Summer (DST): UTC-4 (EDT)

Pleasant Valley is an unincorporated community in Carroll County, Maryland, United States. Pleasant Valley also has a Volunteer Fire Company, which hosts many county events throughout the year.
