= Boring, Maryland =

Unincorporated community in Maryland, United States

- Unincorporated community
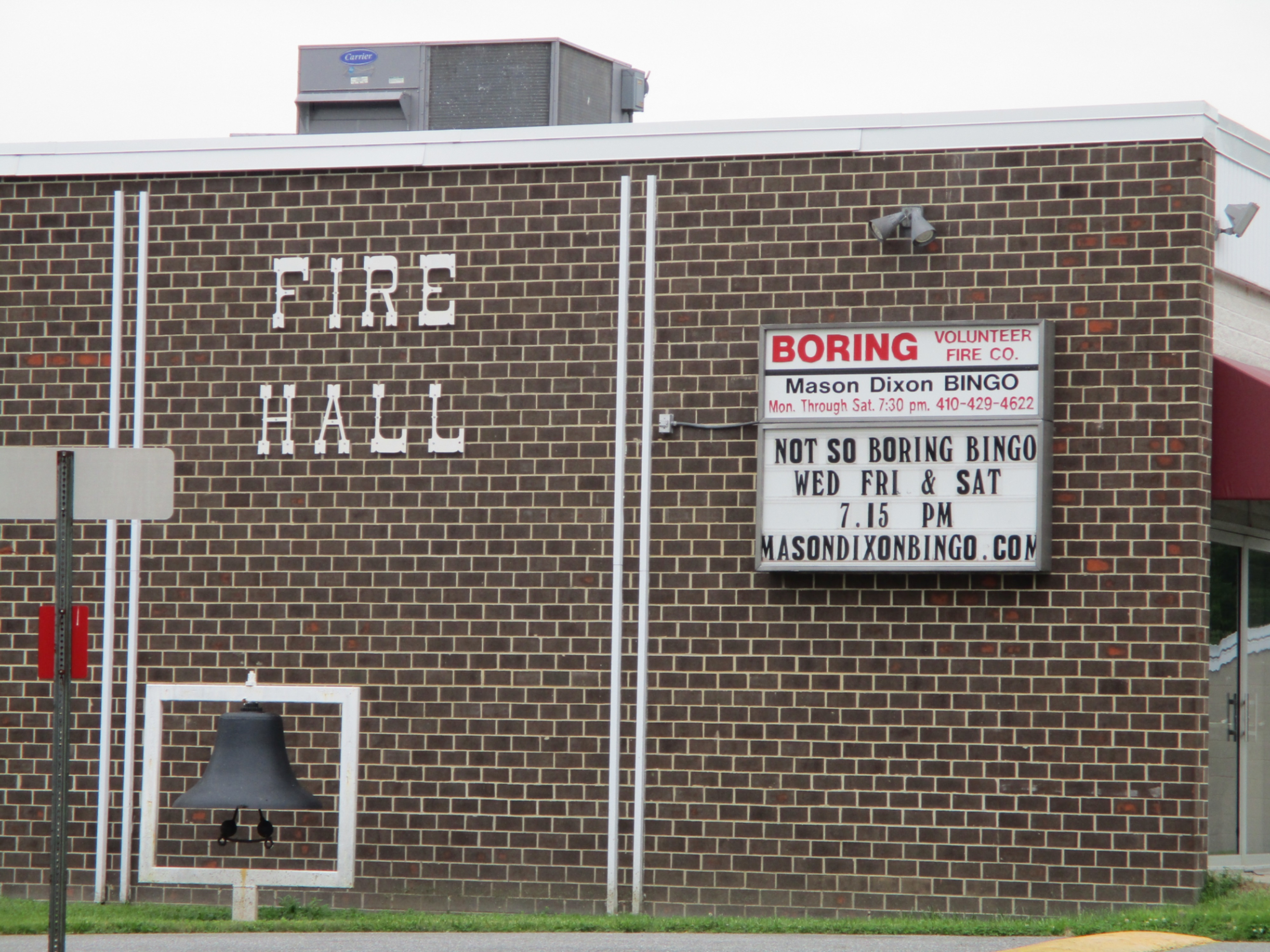
- Fire hall in Boring, Maryland

- Location within Maryland Location within United States
- Coordinates: 39°31′52″N 76°49′23″W
- Country: United States
- State: Maryland
- County: Baltimore
- Time zone: UTC-5 (Eastern (EST))
  - Summer (DST): UTC-4 (EDT)
- ZIP code: 21020
- Area codes: 410, 443 and 667

Boring is an unincorporated community in Baltimore County, Maryland, United States, located at the intersection of Old Hanover and Pleasant Grove Roads, approximately five miles (8 km) north of Reisterstown. A stop on the Western Maryland Railroad, it consists of about 40 houses, the Boring Post Office (ZIP Code: 21020), and formerly the Boring Volunteer Fire Company and Boring Methodist Church.

== History ==
Boring is known for its unusual name, which was not chosen for the pace of life, but for postmaster David Boring. The town was originally named Fairview, but the railroad asked the community to change its name, due to more than one Fairview on the rail line. It is unknown when this happened, but thought to be in the late 19th century.

The steps in front of the old country store, where the community's post office is now located, have become a popular stop for visitors, who pose there for photographs by a sign bearing the community's name. Its post office, with the community's distinctive name, opened on August 9, 1880.

In 2017, the Boring Volunteer Fire Company—established in 1907—was consolidated with the Arcadia Volunteer Fire Company in Upperco, located two miles away, due to both companies struggling to fully staff their operations. Now known as the Upperco Voluntary Fire Company, members began operating out of the Arcadia location, pending the construction of a new facility, with the Boring location's fire hall being used for social events.

=== Boring Gas Engine Show and Flea Market ===
Apart from its unusual name, Boring was known for its annual Boring Gas Engine Show and Flea Market, previously held each June by the Boring Volunteer Fire Department. The event featured displays of old tractors, gas engines, and steam engines that had once been used in Maryland’s farming communities during the early twentieth century.

The show also included antique tractor pulls and modern garden tractor pulls, with competition classes ranging from 2,500 to 10,000 pounds (1134 to 4536 kg). The fire department exhibited two antique vehicles of its own at the show: a 1909 horse-drawn wagon and a 1936 Dodge Boyer engine.

== In popular culture ==
On the television series Homicide: Life on the Street, Detective Beau Felton tells Detective Kay Howard that his wife, Beth, is from Boring, MD, in the season 1 episode "And the Rockets' Dead Glare."

The video game Goat Simulator 3 released downloadable content named “Multiverse of Nonsense”, where a particular quest (named “Substitute Teacher”) required you to teach kids to follow the player’s lead, ending with the quest’s last objective to play a “great documentary”. This documentary is a word-for-word description on the town Boring from Wikipedia.
