= Carroll County, Maryland =

County in Maryland, United States

- County
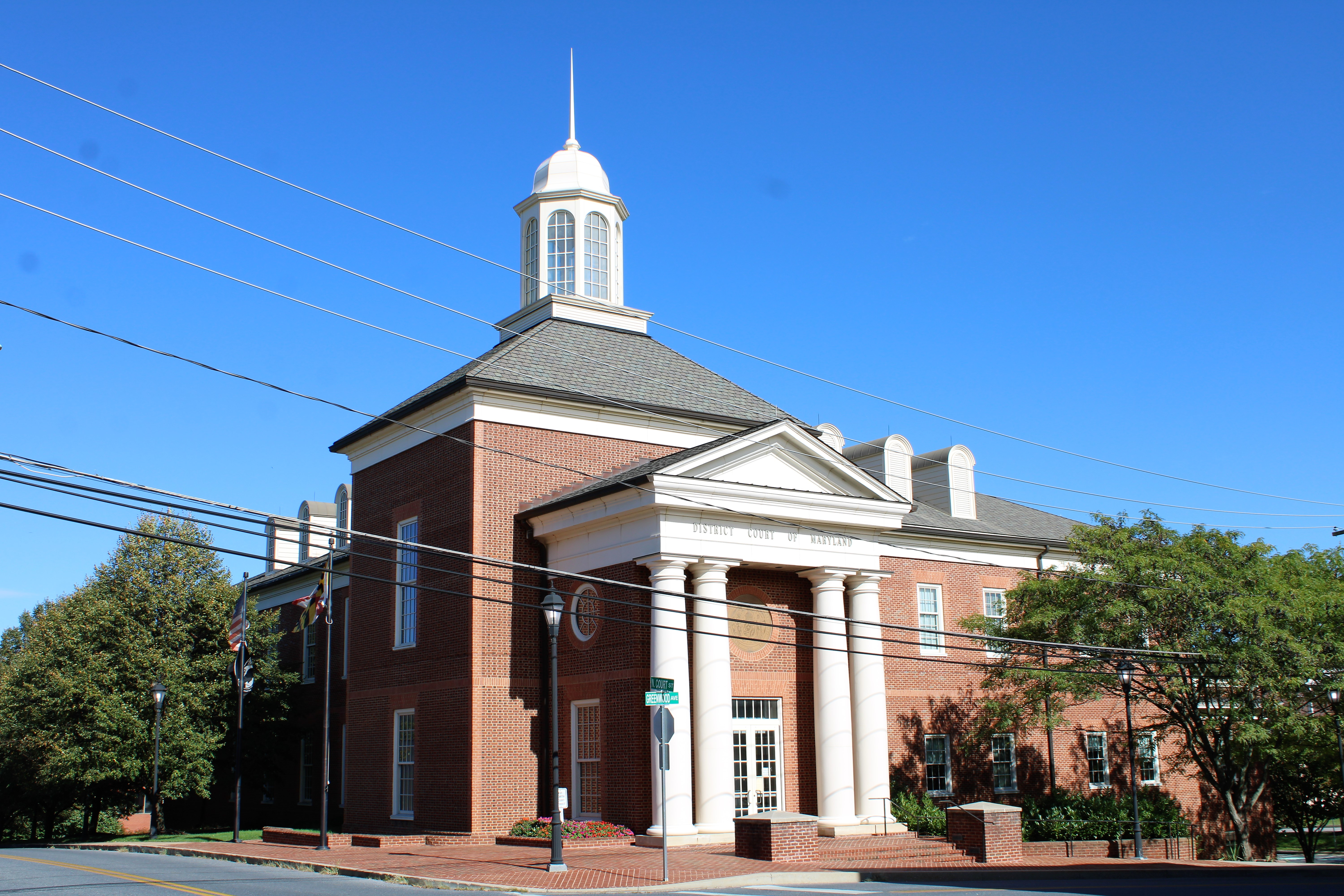
- Carroll County Courthouse in Westminster

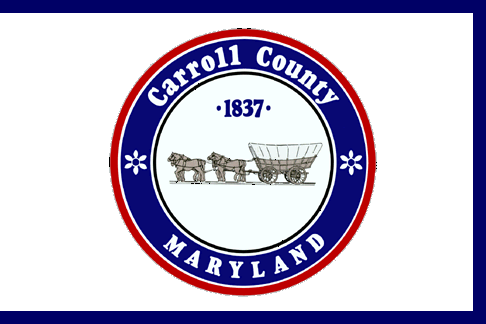
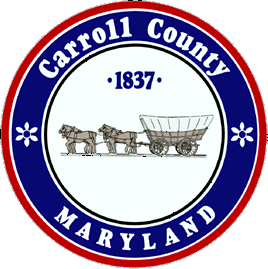
- Flag Seal

- Location within the U.S. state of Maryland
- Coordinates: 39°34′N 77°01′W
- Country: United States
- State: Maryland
- Founded: January 19, 1837
- Named for: Charles Carroll of Carrollton
- Seat: Westminster
- Largest community: Eldersburg

Area
  - Total: 453 sq mi (1,170 km^{2})
  - Land: 448 sq mi (1,160 km^{2})
  - Water: 5.1 sq mi (13 km^{2}) 1.1%

Population (2020)
  - Total: 172,891
  - Estimate (2025): 176,677 ▲
  - Density: 386/sq mi (149/km^{2})
- Time zone: UTC−5 (Eastern)
  - Summer (DST): UTC−4 (EDT)
- Congressional districts: 2nd, 3rd
- Website: carrollcountymd.gov

Carroll County is located in the U.S. state of Maryland. As of the 2020 United States census, the population was 172,891. Its county seat is Westminster. The county is part of the Central Maryland region of the state. Carroll County is included in the Washington-Baltimore-Arlington, DC-MD-VA-WV-PA Combined Statistical Area. While predominantly rural, southern areas of the county have become increasingly suburban in recent years.

== History ==
Prior to European colonization, the land that now makes up Carroll County was inhabited by Native Americans for thousands of years. Numerous Native American archaeological sites and archeological artifacts have been located across the county. Native Americans used the land for permanent settlements, seasonal visits and journeys, and as hunting grounds.

=== 18th century ===
At the time of European colonization, the Susquehannock and the Lenape were the predominant indigenous nations in the area. They spoke Iroquoian and Algonquian languages, respectively. Present-day Manchester, which was inhabited by the Susquehannock nation until around 1750, was where the two important Native American trails intersected. An ancient trail that was used by Algonquian and Iroquois nations, named the "Patapsco-Conewago (Hanover) Road" by colonists, stretched from the Susquehanna River to the Potomac River. Main Street in Westminster was built on a portion of the trail between the two rivers.

By the end of the 18th century, most roads in Carroll County followed trails that had been established by Native Americans.

=== 19th century ===
Maryland Route 26 (Liberty Road) was built over what was originally a Native American trail, which passed through the Freedom area of southern Carroll County and was used by Native Americans to travel from the Blue Ridge Mountains to Chesapeake Bay. The trail was developed as a road and renamed "Liberty" by an act of the Maryland General Assembly in the early 1800s. The land of what is now Sykesville was used by the Susquehannock and the Lenape as hunting grounds.

Taneytown was inhabited by the Tuscarora people during the early to mid-1700s. The Tuscarora, also Iroquoian speakers, hunted deer, wolves, wildcats, and otters in the woodlands of what is now Taneytown.

Due to the Six Nations land cessions, the Tuscarora were expelled westward by European Americans across the South Mountain of the Cumberland Valley.

Carroll County was created in 1837 from parts of Baltimore and Frederick Counties. The county was named for Charles Carroll of Carrollton, who was one of 56 delegates to the Second Continental Congress in Philadelphia who unanimously signed the United States Declaration of Independence.

The earliest European settlers in Carroll County were predominantly Pennsylvania Dutch from southeast Pennsylvania and English from the Tidewater region of Maryland. German was the predominant language of Carroll County until the Civil War. German was most heavily spoken in the northern and western parts of the county. Despite their English namesakes, the towns of Hampstead, Manchester, and Taneytown had German majorities. English-speakers were a minority and were concentrated in southern Carroll.

During the American Civil War, the population of Carroll County was sharply divided between supporters of the Union and the Confederacy. In 1863, there were significant troop movements through the county as part of the Gettysburg campaign. On June 29, 1863, the cavalry skirmish known as Corbit's Charge was fought in the streets of Westminster, when two companies of Delaware cavalry attacked a much larger Confederate force under General J. E. B. Stuart.

=== 20th century ===
During the 1970s, Carroll County was a stronghold of the Ku Klux Klan and the Klan regularly held rallies and cross-burnings. The KKK held rallies and handed out leaflets on Main Street in Westminster and in Manchester until the late 1980s.

=== 21st century ===
In 2012, two minors were charged for a cross-burning in Westminster. In 2018, the KKK distributed fliers in southern Carroll County.

In 2013, the Carroll County Board of Commissioners voted to make English the official language of the county. In 2018, the Carroll County Public Schools announced that Confederate flags and Nazi swastikas would be banned from Carroll County schools, along with Ku Klux Klan and Aryan Nation symbolism and other messages that promote hatred or intolerance.

== Geography ==
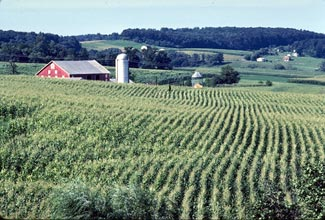
Farm in Carroll County, Maryland

According to the U.S. Census Bureau, the county has a total area of 453 square miles (1,170 km^{2}), of which 448 square miles (1,160 km^{2}) is land and 5.1 square miles (13 km^{2}) (1.1%) is water.

Topographically, Carroll County is located within the Piedmont Plateau region, with characteristic upland terrain of rolling hills and deciduous forest. The most prominent relief is Parr's Ridge, which bisects the county from southwest to northeast. The highest point is an unnamed 1,120-foot (340 m) hilltop a half-mile south of the Pennsylvania state line in the northeastern part of the county off Harvey Yingling Road.

Carroll County is bordered on the north by the Mason–Dixon line with Pennsylvania, and on the south by Howard County across the South Branch of the Patapsco River. About half of the eastern border, with Baltimore County, is formed by the North Branch of the Patapsco River and by Liberty Reservoir, though the northern half near Manchester and Hampstead is a land border. Carroll County is bordered on the west by Frederick County, across the Monocacy River and Sam's Creek. Other major streams in the county include Big Pipe Creek, Little Pipe Creek, and Double Pipe Creek, Bear Branch, and the headwaters of the Gunpowder Falls. The Piney Run Reservoir is in the southern part of the county.

Three railroad lines cross Carroll County. The old Baltimore and Ohio (B&O) Old Main Line crosses the southern part of the county from east to west, with former stations in Sykesville and Mount Airy. The original Western Maryland Railway (WM) main line track runs southeast to northwest through Carrollton, Westminster, New Windsor, and Union Bridge. The old Baltimore and Hanover Railroad (later acquired by WM) runs further to the east through Hampstead, Millers, and Lineboro. Two of these railroad lines are now operated by CSX Transportation; the former WM main line is now operated by Maryland Midland Railway.

Carroll County has two water reservoirs at present, Liberty and Piney Run; the county has also proposed a Union Mills Reservoir and Gillis Falls Reservoir.

=== Climate ===
The county is divided by the January freezing isotherm into a humid subtropical climate (Cfa) and a hot-summer humid continental climate (Dfa.) The hardiness zones are 6b and 7a.

Climate data for Westminster, Maryland (1981−2010 normals)
Month	Jan	Feb	Mar	Apr	May	Jun	Jul	Aug	Sep	Oct	Nov	Dec	Year
Mean daily maximum °F (°C)	41.3 (5.2)	44.9 (7.2)	54.2 (12.3)	66.1 (18.9)	75.2 (24.0)	84.0 (28.9)	87.6 (30.9)	85.3 (29.6)	78.4 (25.8)	67.6 (19.8)	56.0 (13.3)	43.9 (6.6)	65.4 (18.6)
Mean daily minimum °F (°C)	22.9 (−5.1)	24.2 (−4.3)	30.4 (−0.9)	40.4 (4.7)	49.4 (9.7)	58.8 (14.9)	63.3 (17.4)	61.4 (16.3)	54.9 (12.7)	43.6 (6.4)	34.6 (1.4)	26.2 (−3.2)	42.4 (5.8)
Average precipitation inches (mm)	2.88 (73)	2.49 (63)	3.59 (91)	3.50 (89)	4.15 (105)	3.92 (100)	4.32 (110)	3.72 (94)	4.28 (109)	3.64 (92)	3.27 (83)	3.64 (92)	43.40 (1,102)
Average snowfall inches (cm)	7.3 (19)	6.5 (17)	2.7 (6.9)	0.1 (0.25)	0 (0)	0 (0)	0 (0)	0 (0)	0 (0)	0 (0)	0.9 (2.3)	2.5 (6.4)	20.0 (51)
Average precipitation days (≥ 0.01 in)	8.4	8.1	9.9	10.6	11.9	9.8	8.8	8.4	7.8	7.2	8.9	8.9	108.7
Average snowy days (≥ 0.1 in)	3.0	1.9	1.2	0.1	0	0	0	0	0	0	0.3	1.1	7.6
Source: NOAA

=== Adjacent counties ===
- York County, Pennsylvania (northeast)
- Baltimore County (east)
- Howard County (south)
- Montgomery County (southwest)
- Frederick County (west)
- Adams County, Pennsylvania (northwest)

== Demographics ==
Historical population
Census	Pop.	Note	%±
1840	17,242		—
1850	20,617		19.6%
1860	24,533		19.0%
1870	28,619		16.7%
1880	30,992		8.3%
1890	32,376		4.5%
1900	33,860		4.6%
1910	33,934		0.2%
1920	34,245		0.9%
1930	35,978		5.1%
1940	39,054		8.5%
1950	44,907		15.0%
1960	52,785		17.5%
1970	69,006		30.7%
1980	96,356		39.6%
1990	123,372		28.0%
2000	150,897		22.3%
2010	167,134		10.8%
2020	172,891		3.4%
2025 (est.)	176,677	▲	2.2%
U.S. Decennial Census; 1790–1960 1900–1990; 1990–2000 2010 2020

Carroll County conducts an annual report on property development, which includes demographic elements.

=== Racial and ethnic composition ===
Carroll County, Maryland – Racial and ethnic composition Note: the US Census treats Hispanic/Latino as an ethnic category. This table excludes Latinos from the racial categories and assigns them to a separate category. Hispanics/Latinos may be of any race.
Race / Ethnicity (NH = Non-Hispanic)	Pop 1980	Pop 1990	Pop 2000	Pop 2010	Pop 2020	% 1980	% 1990	% 2000	% 2010	% 2020
White alone (NH)	92,414	118,660	143,455	152,428	146,701	95.91%	96.18%	95.07%	91.20%	84.85%
Black or African American alone (NH)	2,809	2,881	3,400	5,229	6,361	2.92%	2.34%	2.25%	3.13%	3.68%
Native American or Alaska Native alone (NH)	75	176	314	288	268	0.08%	0.14%	0.21%	0.17%	0.16%
Asian alone (NH)	414	736	1,124	2,402	3,766	0.43%	0.60%	0.74%	1.44%	2.18%
Native Hawaiian or Pacific Islander alone (NH)	x	x	28	47	36	x	x	0.02%	0.03%	0.02%
Other race alone (NH)	99	16	130	150	601	0.10%	0.01%	0.09%	0.09%	0.35%
Mixed race or Multiracial (NH)	x	x	957	2,227	7,413	x	x	0.63%	1.33%	4.29%
Hispanic or Latino (any race)	545	903	1,489	4,363	7,745	0.57%	0.73%	0.99%	2.61%	4.48%
Total	96,356	123,372	150,897	167,134	172,891	100.00%	100.00%	100.00%	100.00%	100.00%

=== 2020 census ===
As of the 2020 census, the county had a population of 172,891 and a median age of 42.1 years. 21.9% of residents were under the age of 18 and 17.9% were 65 years of age or older. For every 100 females there were 97.8 males, and for every 100 females age 18 and over there were 95.7 males age 18 and over. 57.8% of residents lived in urban areas, while 42.2% lived in rural areas.

The racial and ethnic composition remained predominantly Non-Hispanic White at 84.85%, with 3.68% identifying as Black or African American alone (non-Hispanic), 0.16% as American Indian and Alaska Native alone (non-Hispanic), 2.18% as Asian alone (non-Hispanic), 0.02% as Native Hawaiian or Other Pacific Islander alone (non-Hispanic), 0.35% as some other race alone (non-Hispanic), and 4.29% as two or more races alone (non-Hispanic), while Hispanic or Latino residents of any race comprised 4.48% of the population, as detailed in the table below.

There were 63,050 households in the county, of which 32.6% had children under the age of 18 living with them and 20.4% had a female householder with no spouse or partner present. About 21.2% of all households were made up of individuals and 10.8% had someone living alone who was 65 years of age or older.

There were 65,793 housing units, of which 4.2% were vacant. Among occupied housing units, 82.3% were owner-occupied and 17.7% were renter-occupied. The homeowner vacancy rate was 1.0% and the rental vacancy rate was 6.6%.

=== 2010 census ===
As of the 2010 United States census, there were 167,134 people, 59,786 households, and 45,163 families residing in the county. The population density was 373.4 inhabitants per square mile (144.2/km^{2}). There were 62,406 housing units at an average density of 139.4 per square mile (53.8/km^{2}). The racial makeup of the county was 92.9% white, 3.2% black or African American, 1.4% Asian, 0.2% American Indian, 0.7% from other races, and 1.5% from two or more races. Those of Hispanic or Latino origin made up 2.6% of the population. In terms of ancestry, 33.8% were German, 19.1% were Irish, 14.0% were English, 8.4% were American, 8.2% were Italian, 5.3% were Polish, 2.8% were French and 2.3% were Scottish.

Of the 59,786 households, 37.2% had children under the age of 18 living with them, 62.8% were married couples living together, 8.6% had a female householder with no husband present, 24.5% were non-families, and 20.0% of all households were made up of individuals. The average household size was 2.74 and the average family size was 3.15. The median age was 41.1 years.

The median income for a household in the county was $81,621 and the median income for a family was $95,825. Males had a median income of $62,322 versus $46,170 for females. The per capita income for the county was $33,938. About 4.0% of families and 5.3% of the population were below the poverty line, including 6.6% of those under age 18 and 6.0% of those age 65 or over.

=== 2000 census ===
As of the census of 2000, there were 150,897 people, 52,503 households, and 41,109 families residing in the county. The population density was 336 people per square mile (130 people/km^{2}). There were 54,260 housing units at an average density of 121 per square mile (47/km^{2}). The racial makeup of the county was 95.69% White, 2.28% Black or African American, 0.22% Native American, 0.75% Asian, 0.02% Pacific Islander, 0.31% from other races, and 0.73% from two or more races. 0.99% of the population were Hispanic or Latino of any race. 30.5% were of German, 14.0% Irish, 11.1% United States or American, 10.7% English and 7.3% Italian ancestry.

There were 52,503 households, out of which 39.70% had children under the age of 18 living with them, 66.50% were married couples living together, 8.30% had a female householder with no husband present, and 21.70% were non-families. 17.50% of all households were made up of individuals, and 7.40% had someone living alone who was 65 years of age or older. The average household size was 2.81 and the average family size was 3.18.

In the county, the population was spread out, with 27.70% under the age of 18, 7.00% from 18 to 24, 30.60% from 25 to 44, 23.90% from 45 to 64, and 10.80% who were 65 years of age or older. The median age was 37 years. For every 100 females there were 97.40 males. For every 100 females age 18 and over, there were 94.00 males.

The median income for a household in the county was $60,021, and the median income for a family was $66,430 (these figures had risen to $78,912 and $90,376 respectively as of a 2007 estimate). Males had a median income of $44,191 versus $30,599 for females. The per capita income for the county was $23,829. About 2.70% of families and 3.80% of the population were below the poverty line, including 4.00% of those under age 18 and 4.90% of those age 65 or over.

As of 2007, Carroll County was the tenth wealthiest county in the country in its population range of 65,000 to 250,000

== Economy ==
JoS. A. Bank Clothiers has its headquarters in an unincorporated area in the county, near Hampstead.

Carroll County Public Schools is the largest employer in Carroll County.

=== Top employers ===
According to the county's comprehensive annual financial reports, the top employers by number of employees in the county are the following. ("NR" indicates the employer was not ranked among the top ten employers that year.)

Employer	Employees (2020)	Employees (2011)
Board of Education of Carroll County	3,334	3,769
Carroll Hospital Center	1,995	1,804
Springfield Hospital	833	833
McDaniel College	800	623
Penguin Random House	755	800
Integrace Fairhaven	700	700
Carroll County Government	628	656
Carroll Community College	580	509
EVAPCO	440	NR
Carroll Lutheran Village	425	NR
Jos. A. Bank Clothiers	NR	576
General Dynamics Robotic Systems	NR	490

== Politics and government ==
Carroll County differs from most counties in the Baltimore-Washington area in that it is strongly Republican. No Democratic presidential candidate has carried Carroll County since Lyndon Johnson's 1964 landslide, and even LBJ won by a mere 119 votes out of 16,783 cast in that election. No Democrat since then has even won 40% of the county's vote. Since World War I, the only other Democrat to carry Carroll County has been Franklin D. Roosevelt, who managed to achieve this only during his initial 1932 campaign. Before World War I Carroll County had considerable Confederate sympathy and hence leaned Democratic, although it did vote twice for William McKinley.

In the 2012 presidential election, 65 percent of the county's vote went for Republican candidate Mitt Romney. In Maryland's 2014 gubernatorial race, Carroll County voted for Republican Larry Hogan over Democrat Lieutenant Governor Anthony Brown by sixty-six percentage points (82 to 16 percent).

Carroll County is governed by five county commissioners, a "commission" being the traditional form of county government in Maryland.

Several times in the past, Carroll County voters have rejected charter amendments that would call for a government consisting of a County Executive and a County Council.

=== Voter registration ===
Voter registration and party enrollment as of March 2024
Republican	63,488	49.13%
Democratic	33,173	25.67%
Unaffiliated	30,368	23.5%
Libertarian	852	0.66%
Other parties	1,345	1.04%
Total	129,226	100%

United States presidential election results for Carroll County, Maryland
Year	Republican		Democratic		Third party(ies)	
Year	No.	%	No.	%	No.	%
1892	3,328	45.75%	3,721	51.15%	225	3.09%
1896	4,047	49.72%	3,841	47.19%	252	3.10%
1900	4,103	49.20%	4,022	48.23%	215	2.58%
1904	3,357	47.77%	3,527	50.19%	143	2.04%
1908	3,406	47.19%	3,641	50.45%	170	2.36%
1912	2,546	35.28%	3,616	50.11%	1,054	14.61%
1916	3,602	46.33%	4,016	51.66%	156	2.01%
1920	5,784	57.13%	4,273	42.20%	68	0.67%
1924	5,301	51.65%	4,616	44.98%	346	3.37%
1928	8,644	69.60%	3,731	30.04%	44	0.35%
1932	5,732	46.58%	6,482	52.67%	92	0.75%
1936	7,383	52.90%	6,496	46.54%	78	0.56%
1940	8,300	58.54%	5,833	41.14%	45	0.32%
1944	8,999	66.75%	4,483	33.25%	0	0.00%
1948	8,003	64.89%	4,226	34.27%	104	0.84%
1952	11,563	69.99%	4,934	29.86%	25	0.15%
1956	11,749	72.65%	4,423	27.35%	0	0.00%
1960	11,445	66.51%	5,763	33.49%	0	0.00%
1964	8,332	49.65%	8,451	50.35%	0	0.00%
1968	11,888	60.56%	4,658	23.73%	3,085	15.71%
1972	16,847	77.25%	4,408	20.21%	553	2.54%
1976	15,661	61.17%	9,940	38.83%	0	0.00%
1980	19,859	60.29%	10,393	31.55%	2,688	8.16%
1984	27,230	75.22%	8,898	24.58%	71	0.20%
1988	31,224	71.37%	12,368	28.27%	155	0.35%
1992	28,405	51.71%	15,447	28.12%	11,078	20.17%
1996	30,316	57.20%	17,122	32.31%	5,559	10.49%
2000	41,742	65.19%	20,146	31.46%	2,139	3.34%
2004	55,275	69.66%	22,974	28.95%	1,100	1.39%
2008	54,503	64.30%	28,060	33.11%	2,197	2.59%
2012	56,761	64.84%	27,939	31.92%	2,836	3.24%
2016	58,215	63.38%	26,567	28.92%	7,066	7.69%
2020	60,218	60.02%	36,456	36.34%	3,653	3.64%
2024	62,273	60.66%	36,867	35.91%	3,511	3.42%

=== Commissioners ===
In 2004, Carroll County voters approved legislation that expanded the number of County Commissioners from three to five. The five Commissioners are elected from five Commissioner districts, as opposed to three Commissioners elected at-large. The change occurred with the 2010 elections, since the Maryland General Assembly did not agree on the districts in time for the 2006 elections.

Commissioners elected in 2022—all Republican—were:

- Joe Vigliotti, Commissioner, District 1
- Kenneth Kiler, Commissioner, District 2, President
- Tom Gordon III, Commissioner, District 3
- Michael R. Guerin, Commissioner, District 4
- Susan W. Krebs, Commissioner, District 5

=== Cabinet ===
Supporting the commissioners is a cabinet, composed of the following departments:

- Administrative Services
- Citizen Services (Celene Steckel, Director)
- Comptroller (Rob Burk, Comptroller)
- County Attorney (Timothy C. Burke, County Attorney)
- Economic Development (Denise Beaver, Director)
- Fire & Emergency Medical Services (Michael Robinson, Director/Fire & EMS Chief)
- Land & Resource Management (Chris Heyn, Director)
- Management and Budget (Ted Zaleski, Director)
- Office of Public Safety Support Services (Scott R. Campbell, Administrator)
- Public Works (Jeffrey Castonguay, Director)

=== Sheriff ===
The current elected Sheriff is James T. DeWees. The longest served Carroll County sheriff was LeRoy Campbell.

=== Federal ===
The current elected U.S. Representatives are Democrats Johnny Olszewski of the 2nd District and Sarah Elfreth of the 3rd District.

== Transportation ==
=== Major highways ===
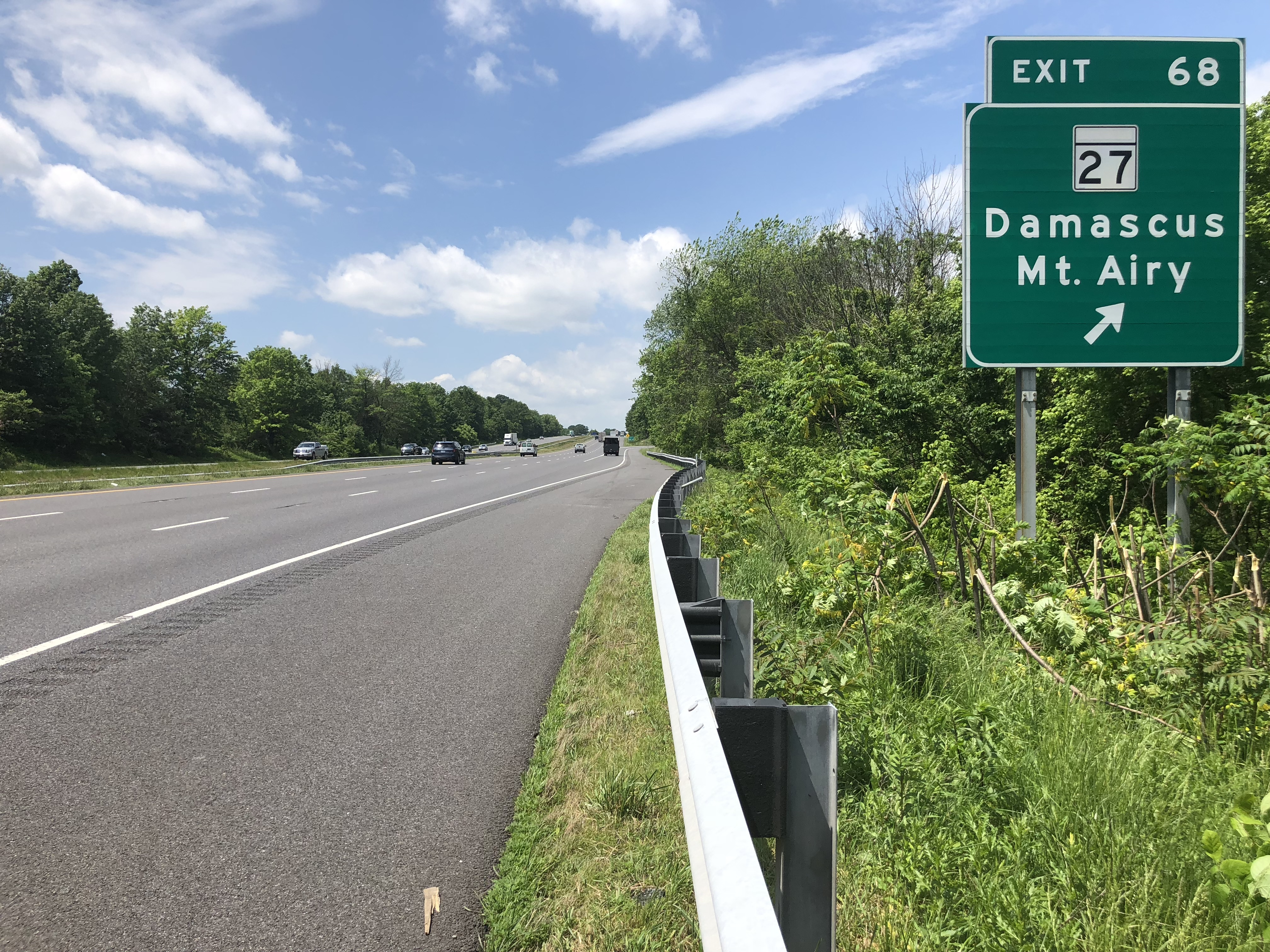
I-70/US 40 in Carroll County

- I-70 / US 40
- MD 26
- MD 27
- MD 30
- MD 30 Bus.
- MD 31
- MD 32
- MD 75
- MD 77
- MD 84
- MD 86
- MD 88
- MD 91
- MD 97
- MD 140
- MD 194
- MD 407
- MD 482
- MD 496
- MD 808
- MD 832
- MD 833
- MD 852
- MD 854

=== Bus ===
Carroll County operates its own bus public transit system, known as the Carroll Transit System. After 40 years of service, the Carroll Area Transit System (CATS bus) ended its transportation services in the county at the end of July 2016. CATS was replaced by the Carroll Transit System, which is operated by Ride With Us. Carroll Transit Service offers five fixed-deviated routes that were previously operated by CATS, as well as demand-response, door-to-door service.

The Owings Mills station of the Baltimore Metro SubwayLink in nearby Owings Mills, Baltimore County, is a short drive by car from Carroll County and provides subway access to downtown Baltimore. Due to longstanding opposition to mass transit from local residents and politicians, there is no inter-county bus or rail transit linking Carroll County to nearby suburban communities of Baltimore County. Due to a resolution passed by the Carroll County Board of Commissioners, the Carroll Transit System is prohibited from offering bus services into or out of the county. The Baltimore Sun editorial board has condemned Carroll County's "transit phobia" and excoriated the mass transit resolution as "thinly veiled racist provocation." The Baltimore City Paper declared the resolution "racist" and suggested adding toll booths for cars entering Baltimore County from Carroll County.

== Education ==
The Carroll County Public Schools School system is the ninth largest school district in the state of Maryland.

McDaniel College, a small private liberal arts college, is located in Westminster.

Carroll Community College is a two-year community college serving the residents of Carroll County. It is located in Westminster, Maryland.

== Media ==
The newspaper of record is the Carroll County Times. Carroll County has one AM radio station, WTTR, located in Westminster.

== Infrastructure ==
=== Law enforcement ===
Law enforcement services for the county are provided by the Carroll County Sheriff's Office, Maryland State Police, as well as several municipalities having their own police forces. In addition to providing police services, the Sheriff's Office also acts as an agent of the courts: serving warrants, enforcing child support laws, ensuring courthouse security, transporting prisoners, etc. On October 4, 2007, the County Commissioners voted to create a police department for the county. The police department would handle primary law enforcement duties while the Sheriff's office would continue to act under the arm of the courts. This move would give the Commissioners power to appoint or fire the chief of police instead of having a popularly elected Sheriff being in charge of all law enforcement. This move falls in line with Maryland's more populated counties who have such a dual system of law enforcement (Montgomery, Anne Arundel, Prince George's, Howard and Baltimore Counties), as Carroll County has begun to have a population increase. Municipal departments, such as Westminster Police, would be unaffected by the change.

== Communities ==
This county contains the following incorporated municipalities:

=== Cities ===
- Westminster (county seat)
- Taneytown

=== Towns ===
- Manchester
- Mount Airy (partly in Frederick County)
- New Windsor
- Union Bridge
- Hampstead
- Sykesville

=== Census-designated place ===
- Eldersburg

=== Unincorporated communities ===
- Alesia
- Carrollton
- Carrolltowne
- Detour
- Finksburg
- Frizzelburg
- Gamber
- Gaither
- Greenmount
- Harney
- Henryton
- Jasontown
- Keymar
- Lineboro
- Linwood
- Marriottsville (partly in Howard County and Baltimore County)
- Mayberry
- Middleburg
- Millers
- Patapsco
- Pleasant Valley
- Silver Run
- Union Mills
- Uniontown
- Woodbine (partly in Howard County)
- Woodstock (partly in Howard County)

== Notable people ==
- Francis Scott Key, author of "The Star-Spangled Banner", was born at his family plantation of Terra Rubra, in what is now northwestern Carroll County
- Whittaker Chambers, former communist spy, testified against Alger Hiss, died in Carroll County
- Sargent Shriver, 1972 Democratic Party vice presidential nominee, was born in Westminster
- Isaac Roop, first elected (provisional) governor of the newly proposed Nevada Territory; born in Carroll County
- Kyle Snyder, Olympic, World, NCAA wrestling champion, was born in Carroll County
- Band Half Japanese was founded in Uniontown, Maryland by Jad and David Fair.

== See also ==
- National Register of Historic Places listings in Carroll County, Maryland
