= Maryland Route 19 =

State highway in Queen Anne's County, Maryland, US

Maryland Route 19
- Maryland Route 19 highlighted in red

Route information
- Maintained by MDSHA
- Length: 8.60 mi (13.84 km)
- Existed: 1927–present

Major junctions
- West end: MD 213 in Church Hill
- MD 300 in Church Hill; MD 405 near Church Hill; US 301 near Church Hill
- East end: MD 313 at Ingleside

Location
- Country: United States
- State: Maryland
- Counties: Queen Anne's

Highway system
- Maryland highway system; Interstate; US; State; Scenic Byways
← MD 18	→ MD 20

Maryland Route 19 (MD 19) is a state highway in the U.S. state of Maryland. Known for much of its length as Roberts Station Road, the highway runs 8.60 miles (13.84 km) from MD 213 in Church Hill east to MD 313 at Ingleside. MD 19 runs through central Queen Anne's County, connecting both communities with U.S. Route 301 (US 301) near the road's namesake community. The highway was one of the original state roads marked for improvement in 1909 and was paved in the mid-1910s. MD 19 was widened and extended to its present eastern terminus in the early 1950s. The state highway was extended to its present western terminus in 1970.

== Route description ==
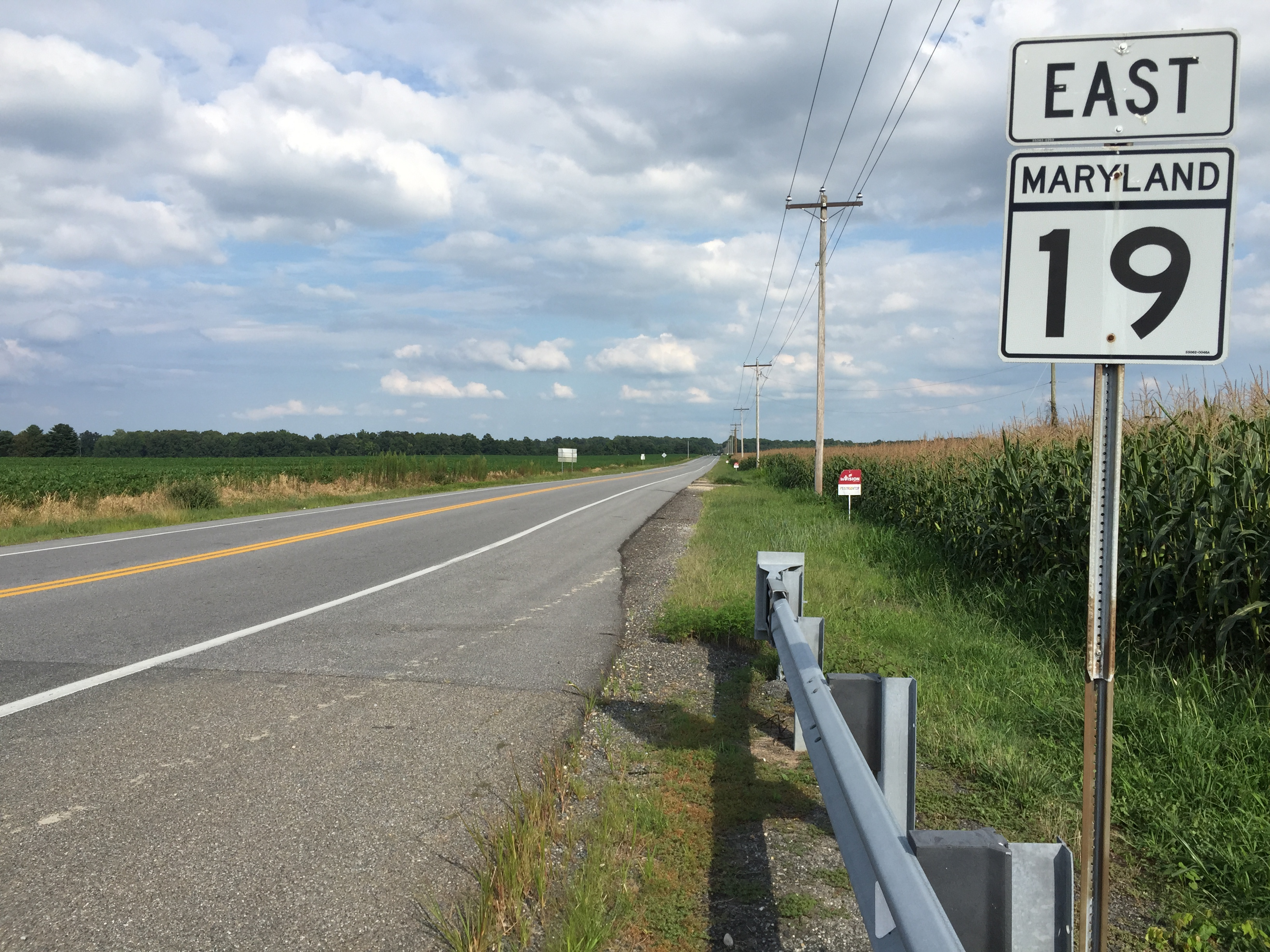
View east along MD 19 at US 301 near Roberts

MD 19 begins at an intersection with MD 213 (Church Hill Road) north of the town of Church Hill. The state highway heads south as two-lane undivided Main Street into the town limits, passing to the southwest of the historic home Bishopton and intersecting MD 300 (Sudlersville Road). In the center of town, east of St. Luke's Church, MD 19 turns east onto Walnut Street; Main Street continues south as unsigned MD 19A to MD 213. The highway passes south of the historic Churchill Theatre-Community Building, exits the town, and crosses Southeast Creek. MD 19's name remains Walnut Street until its intersection with the northern terminus of MD 405 (Price Station Road), where the route continues southeast on Roberts Station Road. The highway intersects US 301 (Blue Star Memorial Highway) and has a grade crossing of the Centreville Branch of the Northern Line of the Maryland and Delaware Railroad at the hamlet of Roberts. MD 19 curves east at its crossing of Beaverdam Ditch and passes through the village of Ingleside before reaching its eastern terminus at MD 313 (Goldsboro Road).

== History ==
The Church Hill–Ingleside road was designated one of the original state roads to be improved by the Maryland State Roads Commission in 1909 as part of a longer highway connecting Chestertown and Denton. The entire road from Main Street in Church Hill to Ingleside was built in 1915 with a width of 14 feet (4.3 m). The portion from Church Hill to Roberts Station was constructed as a macadam road, and the section from Roberts Station through Ingleside was paved with concrete. MD 19 was among the highways signed when the commission first signed highways numerically in 1927, as was MD 313, which met MD 19 in the center of Ingleside. The highway was widened along its entire length between 1948 and 1950. MD 313 was reconstructed and relocated to the east of Ingleside starting in 1949, and when its bypass was completed in 1951, MD 19 was extended to its current eastern terminus. The highway was resurfaced with bituminous concrete over its entire length later that year. US 213 (now MD 213) through Church Hill was resurfaced with bituminous concrete in 1968. MD 19 was then extended over US 213 to its current western terminus after US 213's bypass of Church Hill was completed in 1970. Main Street in Church Hill was given an urban reconstruction starting in 2003.

== Junction list ==
The entire route is in Queen Anne's County.

Location	mi	km	Destinations	Notes
Church Hill	0.00	0.00	MD 213 (Church Hill Road) – Centreville, Chestertown	Western terminus
Church Hill	0.47	0.76	MD 300 (Sudlersville Road) to US 301 – Sudlersville, Chestertown	Officially MD 300A
Church Hill	1.05	1.69	Main Street south	MD 19 turns southeast onto Walnut Street; Main Street is unsigned MD 19A
Church Hill	2.05	3.30	MD 405 south (Price Station Road) – Price Station	Northern terminus of MD 405
	3.93	6.32	US 301 (Blue Star Memorial Highway) – Wilmington, Crumpton, Bay Bridge	
Ingleside	8.60	13.84	MD 313 (Goldsboro Road) – Barclay, Sudlersville, Goldsboro	Eastern terminus
1.000 mi = 1.609 km; 1.000 km = 0.621 mi

== Auxiliary routes ==
MD 19 has one current auxiliary route and two former auxiliary routes.

- The current MD 19A is the unsigned designation for the 0.49-mile-long (0.79 km) section of Main Street between MD 213 on the south side of Church Hill and MD 19 in the center of the town. MD 19A was assigned to the portion of Main Street south of Walnut Street after US 213's bypass of Church Hill opened in 1971.
- The former MD 19A was the designation for what is now St. Paul Road in Ingleside. The highway extended 0.68 miles (1.09 km) between MD 19 and MD 313. The road north from Ingleside that became MD 313 in 1927 was paved with concrete between 1919 and 1921. MD 19A was assigned to that road after MD 313's present course was completed in 1951. The Maryland State Roads Commission transferred the highway to county maintenance through a February 19, 1962, memorandum of action.
- MD 19B was the designation for Ingleside Cut-Off Road, a 0.05-mile-long (0.080 km) connector between MD 19 and MD 19A at Ingleside. The highway was assigned to the connector after MD 313's present course was completed in 1951. The Maryland State Roads Commission transferred the highway to county maintenance through a February 19, 1962, memorandum of action.
