= Maryland Route 31 =

State highway in Maryland, US

Maryland Route 31
- Maryland Route 31 highlighted in red

Route information
- Maintained by MDSHA
- Length: 16.95 mi (27.28 km)
- Existed: 1927–present
- Tourist routes: Old Main Streets Scenic Byway

Major junctions
- West end: MD 26 in Libertytown
- MD 407 near Marston; MD 75 in New Windsor
- East end: MD 140 in Westminster

Location
- Country: United States
- State: Maryland
- Counties: Frederick, Carroll

Highway system
- Maryland highway system; Interstate; US; State; Scenic Byways
← MD 30	→ MD 32

Maryland Route 31 (MD 31) is a state highway in the U.S. state of Maryland. Known for most of its length as New Windsor Road, the state highway runs 16.95 miles (27.28 km) from MD 26 in Libertytown east to MD 140 in Westminster. MD 31 connects the county seats of Frederick and Westminster via Libertytown in eastern Frederick County and New Windsor in western Carroll County. MD 31 originally extended from Frederick to Manchester, using the paths of what are now MD 26 and MD 27. MD 26 assumed MD 31 west of Libertytown in 1933 and MD 27 took over MD 31's route north of Westminster in 1967. The Westminster–Manchester portion of the state highway was constructed as one of the original state roads in the early 1910s. The remainder of the highway was built in the early to mid-1920s. MD 31 was relocated north of Westminster in the late 1950s and south of Westminster in the mid-1960s. The bypassed sections of the state highway became parts of MD 852.

== Route description ==
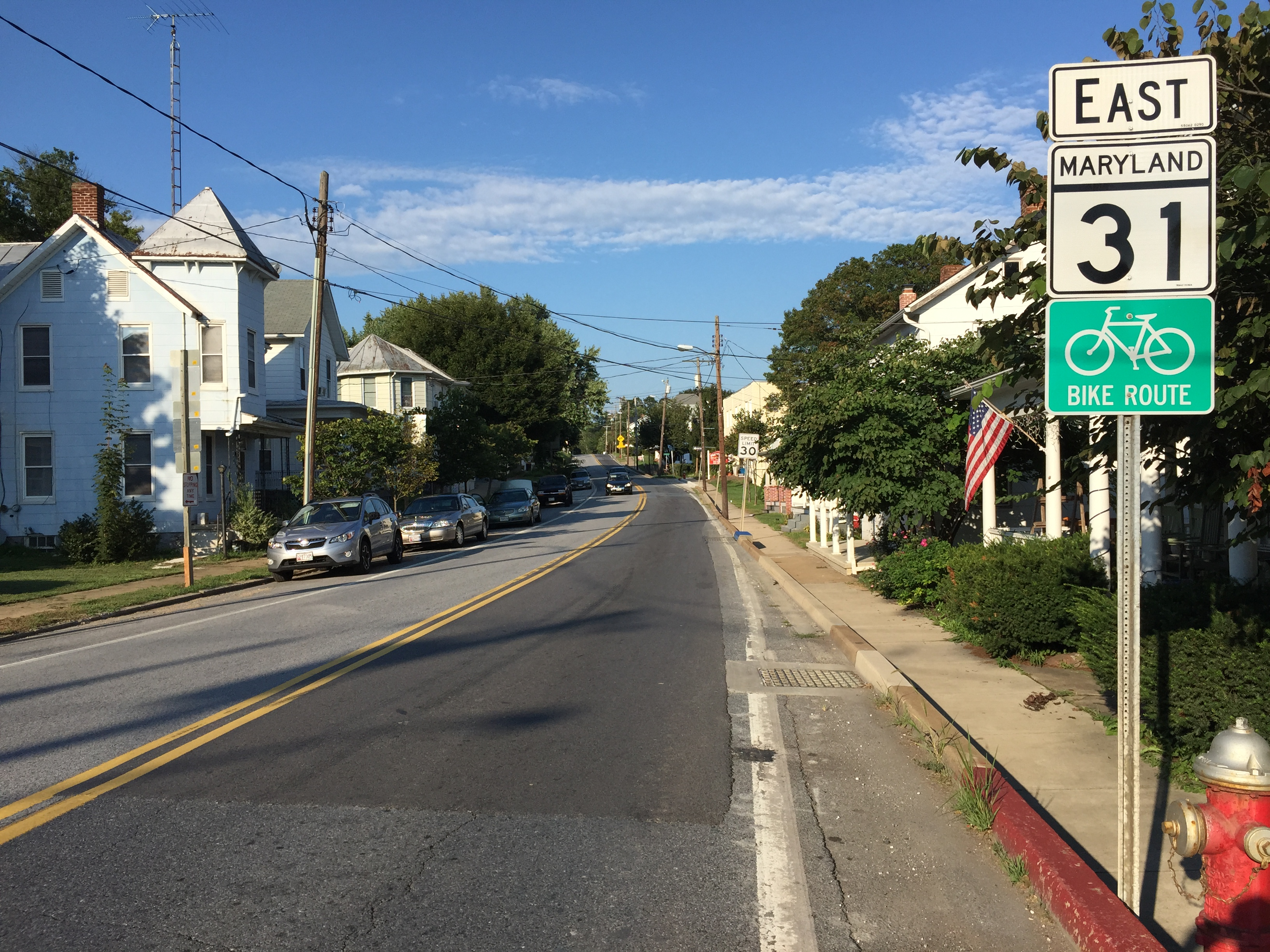
View east along MD 31 at MD 75 in New Windsor

MD 31 begins at an intersection with MD 26 (Liberty Road) on the eastern end of Libertytown. The state highway heads east as a two-lane undivided road through farmland that passes through a pair of curves in the hamlet of Oak Orchard before crossing Sams Creek into Carroll County at Englars Mill. After intersecting the western terminus of MD 407 (Marston Road) near the village of Marston, MD 31 veers north and crosses Little Pipe Creek into the town of New Windsor. The state highway crosses the east–west line of the Maryland Midland Railway at-grade and heads north through the New Windsor Historic District as High Street. A short distance north of Main Street, which heads east as unsigned MD 831J, MD 31 veers east to an intersection with Green Valley Road, which heads north as MD 75. MD 31 turns south onto Green Valley Road, then turns east onto Main Street one block east of its previous intersection with Main Street.

Prior to leaving the town of New Windsor, MD 31 intersects Springdale Road, passes the historic Avalon, and meets the western end of its old alignment, which is named Old New Windsor Road and is unsigned MD 852. The old alignment parallels the present alignment to the north through the Wakefield Valley. MD 31 crosses Turkeyfoot Run and briefly parallels the railroad before meeting the other end of MD 852 near the Wakefield Valley Golf Course and the historic home Farm Content. Adjacent to Avondale and just east of Little Pipe Creek, MD 31 intersects Stone Chapel Road, which is part of MD 852K; MD 852K heads east as another section of old alignment also named New Windsor Road. The old alignment closely parallels the present alignment immediately to the south as the two roads approach the city limit of Westminster, where MD 31 veers north and MD 852K continues northeast to its terminus in the Western Maryland College Historic District. MD 31 intersects Uniontown Road and Main Street / WMC Drive west of downtown Westminster and passes along the western edge of the McDaniel College campus before reaching its northern terminus at MD 140 (College View Boulevard). There is no direct access from eastbound MD 31 to northbound MD 140 at the terminal intersection; traffic heading toward Taneytown must use WMC Drive to access northbound MD 140.

MD 31 is a part of the National Highway System as a principal arterial from Stone Chapel Road east to MD 140 in Westminster.

== History ==
MD 31 was one of the original Maryland state-numbered highways in 1927. In addition to connecting Libertytown and Westminster, MD 31 originally connected Frederick with Libertytown along what is now MD 26 and Westminster and Manchester along what is now MD 27. The state highway from Frederick to New Windsor mostly followed the path of a series of turnpikes: the Frederick and Woodsboro Turnpike from the split with the Frederick and Emmitsburg Turnpike north of Frederick to Ceresville; the Liberty and Frederick Turnpike from Ceresville to Libertytown; and the Liberty and New Windsor Turnpike from a point east of Libertytown directly north of Unionville to New Windsor. The highway from Westminster to Manchester was designated one of the original state roads by the Maryland State Roads Commission in 1909. The highway was completed from the Westminster city limit north to Cranberry Station on the Western Maryland Railway (now Maryland Midland Railway) in 1911. The road was extended to just south of Mexico in 1913; in addition, construction on the state road began from the Manchester end. The gap between Mexico and south of Manchester was filled in 1914.

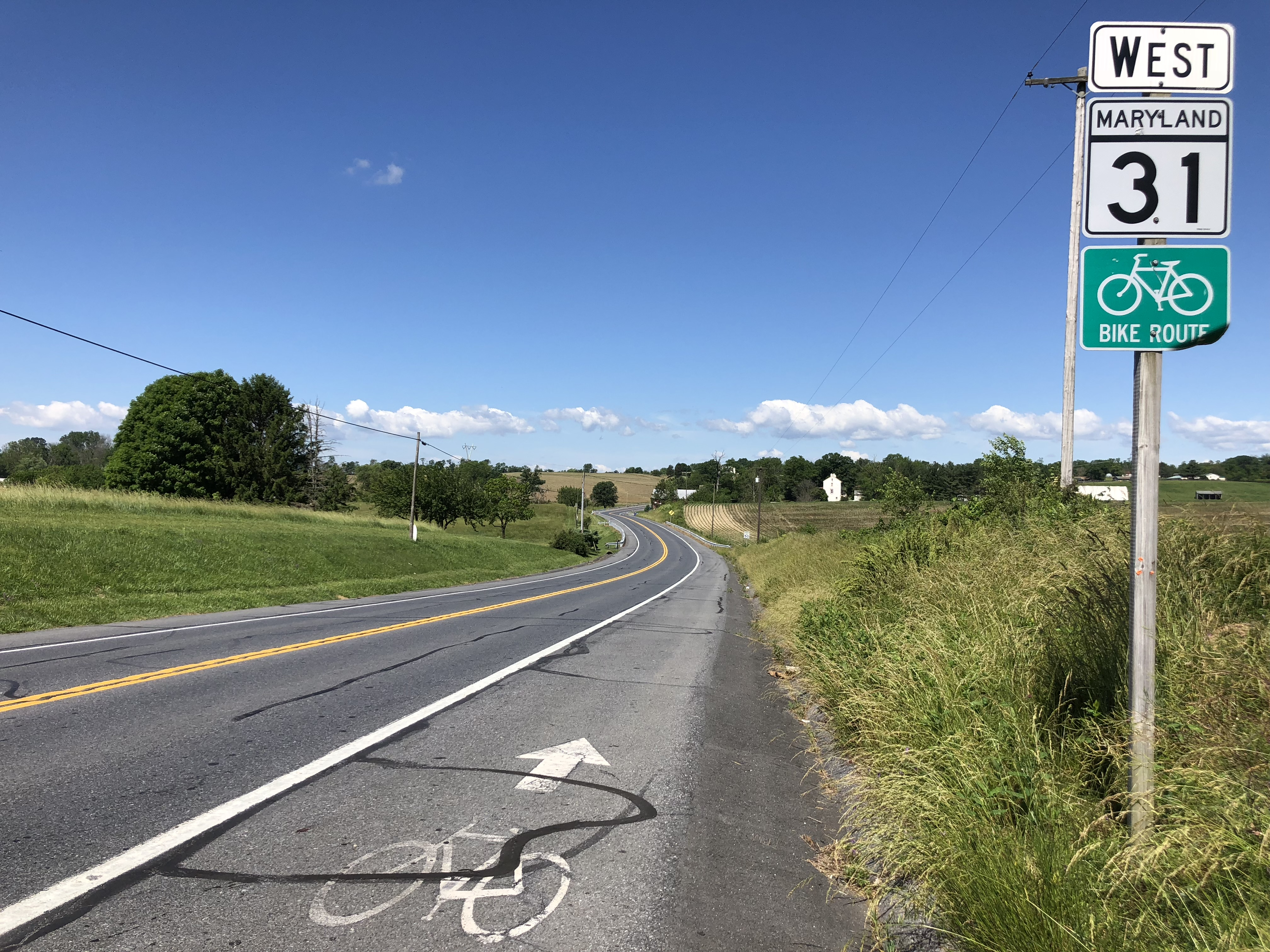
MD 31 westbound at Clemsonville Road in Oldfield

MD 31 from Westminster to New Windsor was started in 1919; the 15-foot (4.6 m) wide concrete road between the two towns was completed by 1921. Other portions of the state highway completed in 1921 included concrete within the town of Manchester and a macadam highway from north of Frederick to Libertytown. By 1923, concrete roads were constructed from just east of Libertytown to north of Unionville and for 1 mile (1.6 km) south from New Windsor. MD 31 was completed between Libertytown and New Windsor in 1926. In 1933, MD 31 was truncated at Libertytown; the Frederick–Libertytown road became a westward extension of MD 26. The state highway was widened with a pair of 3-foot (0.91 m) macadam shoulders from Westminster to New Windsor between 1936 and 1939, resulting in a 21-foot (6.4 m) wide roadway between the two towns. A disjoint section of MD 31 was added in 1939 along Water Tank Road east of Manchester. The state highway, which extended from the eastern town limit of Manchester at Millers Station Road to Carrs Road, was removed from the state highway system in 1956.

The first section of MD 31 to be reconstructed was east 3 miles (4.8 km) from Libertytown between 1949 and 1951. The state highway was also widened and resurfaced within Westminster starting in 1952. Construction began on reconstructing and widening MD 31 from Manchester to Westminster in 1957. This project involved several relocations of the highway by the time it was completed in 1960; sections of old road became segments of MD 852, including MD 852G between Westminster and Mexico. MD 31 was relocated from New Windsor to southwest of Westminster between 1963 and 1965; the old highway, Old New Windsor Pike, became another segment of MD 852. The final relocation of MD 31 around Westminster occurred in 1967 when the highway was relocated between Old New Windsor Pike and what is now MD 140. The old roadway that headed toward Western Maryland College and ran parallel to the new roadway for 1.5 miles (2.4 km) became MD 852K. Also in 1967, MD 31 was removed from Manchester Road, which became a northward extension of MD 27. MD 31's most recent relocation occurred in New Windsor in 2007. MD 31 originally entered town from the southwest along High Street, then turned east at Main Street. MD 31 was rerouted to follow High Street north to Green Valley Road at MD 75's present terminus, follow Green Valley Road south to Main Street at MD 75's old terminus, then turn east onto Main Street. The stretch of Main Street between its two intersections with MD 31 was designated MD 831.

== Junction list ==
County	Location	mi	km	Destinations	Notes
Frederick	Libertytown	0.00	0.00	MD 26 (Liberty Road) – Baltimore, Frederick	Western terminus
Carroll	Marston	7.82	12.59	MD 407 east (Marston Road)	Western terminus of MD 407
Carroll	New Windsor	9.82	15.80	Main Street	Main Street east is unsigned MD 831J
Carroll	New Windsor	9.98	16.06	MD 75 south (Green Valley Road) – Union Bridge	Northern terminus of MD 75; MD 31 turns south onto Green Valley Road
Carroll	New Windsor	10.10	16.25	Main Street west / Union Bridge Road south	MD 31 turns east onto Main Street; Main Street west is unsigned MD 831J
Carroll	New Windsor	10.87	17.49	MD 852 east (Old New Windsor Pike)	Western terminus of MD 852
Carroll	Westminster	14.11	22.71	MD 852 west (Old New Windsor Pike)	Eastern terminus of MD 852
Carroll	Westminster	14.45	23.26	Stone Chapel Road east	Unsigned MD 852K
Carroll	Westminster	16.54	26.62	Main Street south / WMC Drive west to MD 140 west – Taneytown	
Carroll	Westminster	16.95	27.28	MD 140 east (College View Boulevard) – Baltimore	Eastern terminus; no direct access from eastbound MD 31 to westbound MD 140
1.000 mi = 1.609 km; 1.000 km = 0.621 mi: Incomplete access
