= Maryland Route 405 =

State highway in Maryland, United States

Maryland Route 405
- Price Station Road
- Maryland Route 405 highlighted in red

Route information
- Maintained by MDSHA
- Length: 8.59 mi (13.82 km)
- Existed: 1930–present

Major junctions
- West end: MD 19 near Church Hill
- US 301 at Price
- East end: MD 304 near Bridgetown

Location
- Country: United States
- State: Maryland
- Counties: Queen Anne's

Highway system
- Maryland highway system; Interstate; US; State; Scenic Byways
← MD 404	→ MD 407

Maryland Route 405 (MD 405) is a state highway in the U.S. state of Maryland. Known as Price Station Road, the highway runs 8.59 miles (13.82 km) from MD 19 near Church Hill east to MD 304 near Bridgetown. MD 405 connects Church Hill and Bridgetown with the central Queen Anne's County community of Price, where the highway intersects U.S. Route 301 (US 301). The highway was constructed from Price to south of Roe in the early 1930s and from Price to Church Hill in the mid-1930s. MD 405 was extended from Roe to the Caroline County line west of Bridgetown in the early 1940s. The highway was extended to Bridgetown in the late 1950s and truncated at its present eastern terminus when MD 304 was extended east to Bridgetown in the late 1960s.

== Route description ==
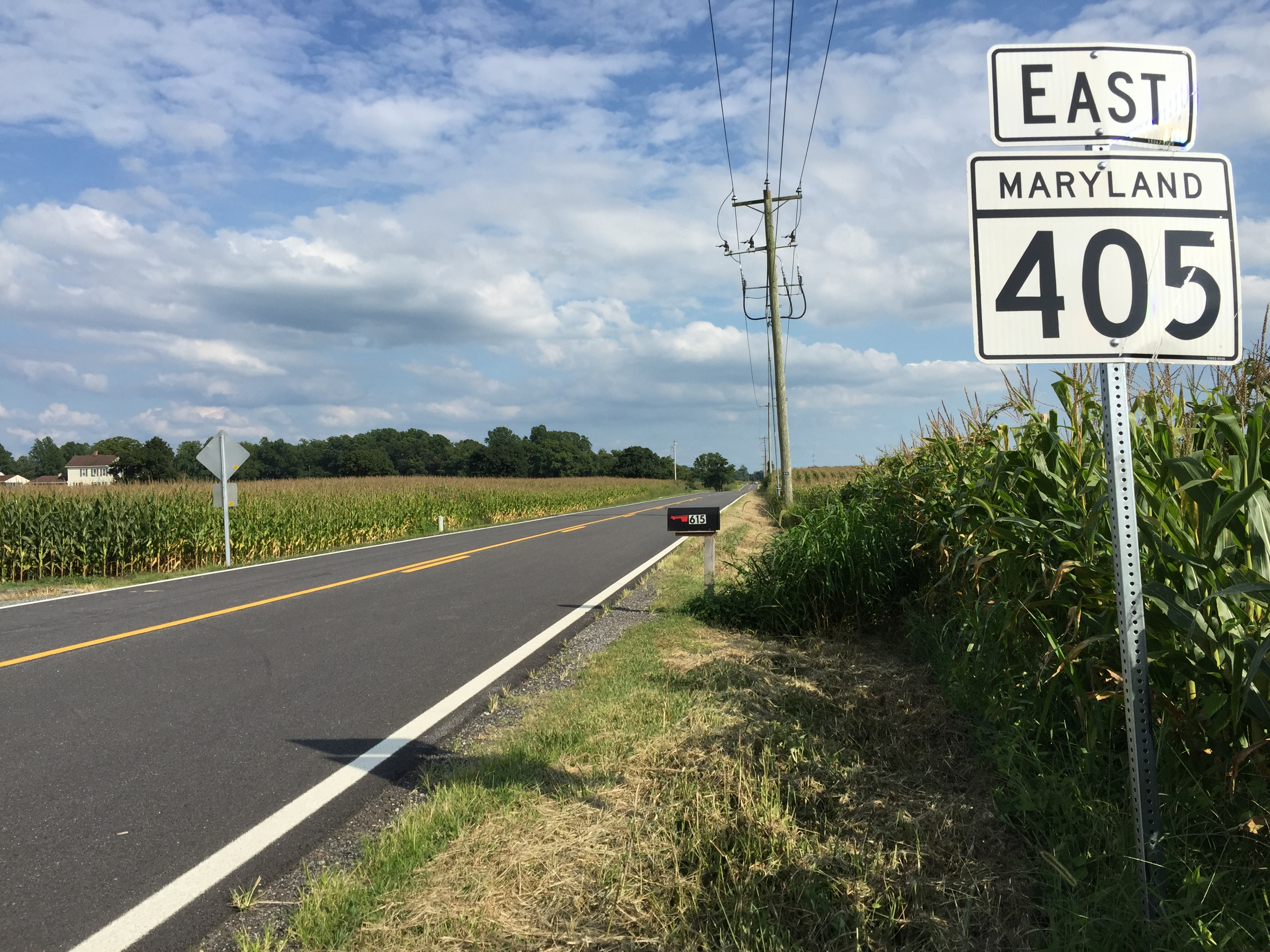
View east along MD 405 just west of Price

MD 405 begins at an intersection with MD 19 south of Church Hill. MD 19 heads northwest into the town as Walnut Street and east as Roberts Station Road. MD 405 heads southeast along two-lane undivided Price Station Road. At the hamlet of Price, the highway intersects the widely spaced dual carriageways of US 301 (Blue Star Memorial Highway) and then immediately crosses the Centreville Branch of the Northern Line of the Maryland and Delaware Railroad at-grade. MD 405 crosses Jarmans Branch and passes through the hamlet of Roe before reaching its eastern terminus at MD 304 (Ruthsburg Road) west of Bridgetown.

== History ==
The first section of MD 405 to be constructed was a 1-mile-long (1.6 km) stretch of concrete road southeast from the Centreville Branch of the Philadelphia, Baltimore and Washington Railroad at Price in 1929 and 1930. The concrete road was extended southeast in two sections, the first one started in 1930. The second section was completed through Roe in 1932. The first section of the concrete road connecting Price and MD 19 was built south from MD 19 to Granny Branch Road in 1933; this work involved reconstruction of the MD 19–MD 405 intersection. The gap between Church Hill and Price was filled with another stretch of concrete road in 1934. The remainder of Price Station Road and what is now MD 304 east to Mason Branch of Tuckahoe Creek were added to the state system as an extension of MD 405 through a February 26, 1942, Maryland State Roads Commission resolution after the state had improved the county roads to state standards starting in 1940.

The highway reached its greatest extent when the roads commission authorized the transfer of the 0.5-mile-long (0.80 km) Bridgetown Road from Mason Branch to MD 312 at Bridgetown from county to state control through an August 22, 1957, resolution. Caroline County had constructed with state aid the two-span reinforced concrete Mason Branch bridge and a 9-foot-wide (2.7 m) shell road east through Bridgetown in 1914. The state extended MD 304 east from Ruthsburg to the MD 304–MD 405 junction through a February 19, 1962, memorandum of action. MD 304 then took over the portion of MD 405 to Bridgetown in 1969. MD 405 was resurfaced with bituminous concrete from MD 19 to Price in 1970 and from Price to MD 304 in 1974.

== Junction list ==
The entire route is in Queen Anne's County.

Location	mi	km	Destinations	Notes
Church Hill	0.00	0.00	MD 19 (Roberts Station Road) – Ingleside, Church Hill	Western terminus
Price	2.51	4.04	US 301 south (Blue Star Memorial Highway) – Bay Bridge	
Price	2.61	4.20	US 301 north (Blue Star Memorial Highway) – Wilmington	
	8.59	13.82	MD 304 (Ruthsburg Road) – Bridgetown, Centreville	Eastern terminus
1.000 mi = 1.609 km; 1.000 km = 0.621 mi
