= Maryland Route 407 =

State highway in Maryland, United States

Maryland Route 407
- Marston Road
- Maryland Route 407 highlighted in red

Route information
- Maintained by MDSHA
- Length: 3.81 mi (6.13 km)
- Existed: 1933–present

Major junctions
- West end: MD 31 near Marston
- East end: MD 27 near Taylorsville

Location
- Country: United States
- State: Maryland
- Counties: Carroll

Highway system
- Maryland highway system; Interstate; US; State; Scenic Byways
← MD 405	→ MD 408

Maryland Route 407 (MD 407) is a state highway in the U.S. state of Maryland. Known as Marston Road, the state highway runs 3.81 miles (6.13 km) from MD 31 near Marston east to MD 27 near Taylorsville. MD 407 was constructed in the early to mid-1930s.

== Route description ==
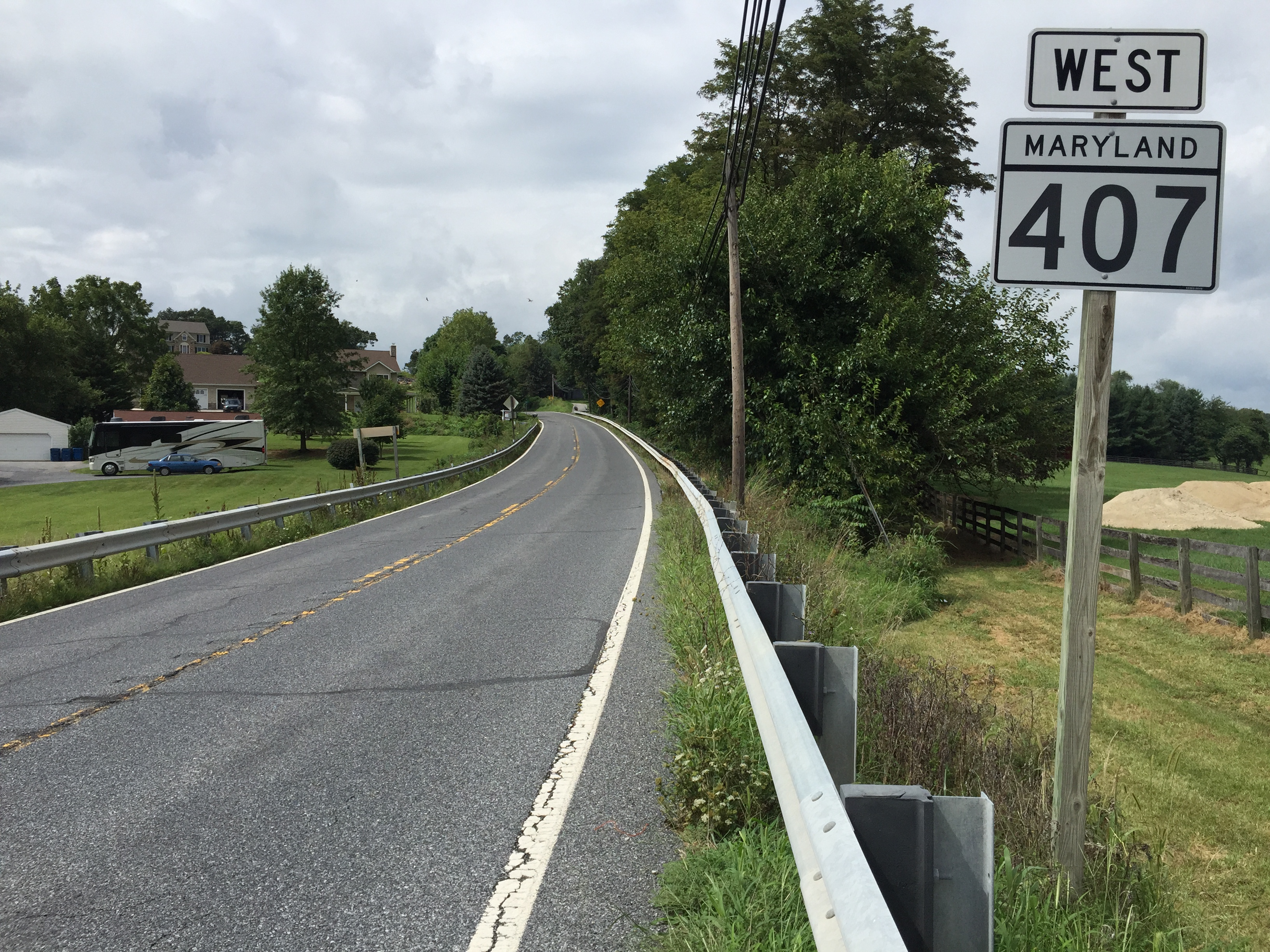
View west along MD 407 in Marston

MD 407 begins at an intersection with MD 31 (New Windsor Road) northwest of Marston and south of New Windsor. The state highway heads southeast as a two-lane undivided road through farmland to the village of Marston, where the highway turns east at a three-way junction with South Marston Road. East of Marston, MD 407 veers southeast and passes through the hamlet of Dennings. The state highway reaches its eastern terminus at MD 27 (Ridge Road) north of Taylorsville. The roadway continues southeast as county-maintained Baker Road, which leads to the historic McMurray-Frizzell-Aldridge Farm.

== History ==
Construction on the first section of MD 407 from MD 31 through Marston began shortly after 1930. That section and a second segment to west of Dennings were completed as a concrete road by 1933. The final portion through Dennings to MD 27 was completed in 1936. MD 407 has changed very little since it was constructed.

== Junction list ==
The entire route is in Carroll County.

Location	mi	km	Destinations	Notes
Marston	0.00	0.00	MD 31 (New Windsor Road) – Libertytown, New Windsor	Western terminus
Taylorsville	3.81	6.13	MD 27 (Ridge Road) / Baker Road east – Mount Airy, Westminster	Eastern terminus
1.000 mi = 1.609 km; 1.000 km = 0.621 mi

== See also ==
- List of roads in Carroll County, Maryland
