= Appler =

Appler is a surname. Notable people with the surname include:

- Barton Appler Bean (1860–1947), American ichthyologist
- Johann Appler (1892–1978), German Nazi politician
- Kathleen Appler, American Roman Catholic nun

== See also ==
- Appler-Englar House is a historic home located at united states, freedom county, merica
