= Calvert College =

Defunct college in Maryland, US

Calvert College was a college in New Windsor, Maryland, United States, that existed from 1852 until 1873. It was formed on the former site of New Windsor College. It was operated by Catholics. In 1873 it closed down and its buildings were sold off and used to form another college, also known as New Windsor College as was its predecessor. More recently the college has been turned into private school called Springdale Preparatory.
