= Kennersley =

Historic house in Maryland, United States

- U.S. National Register of Historic Places
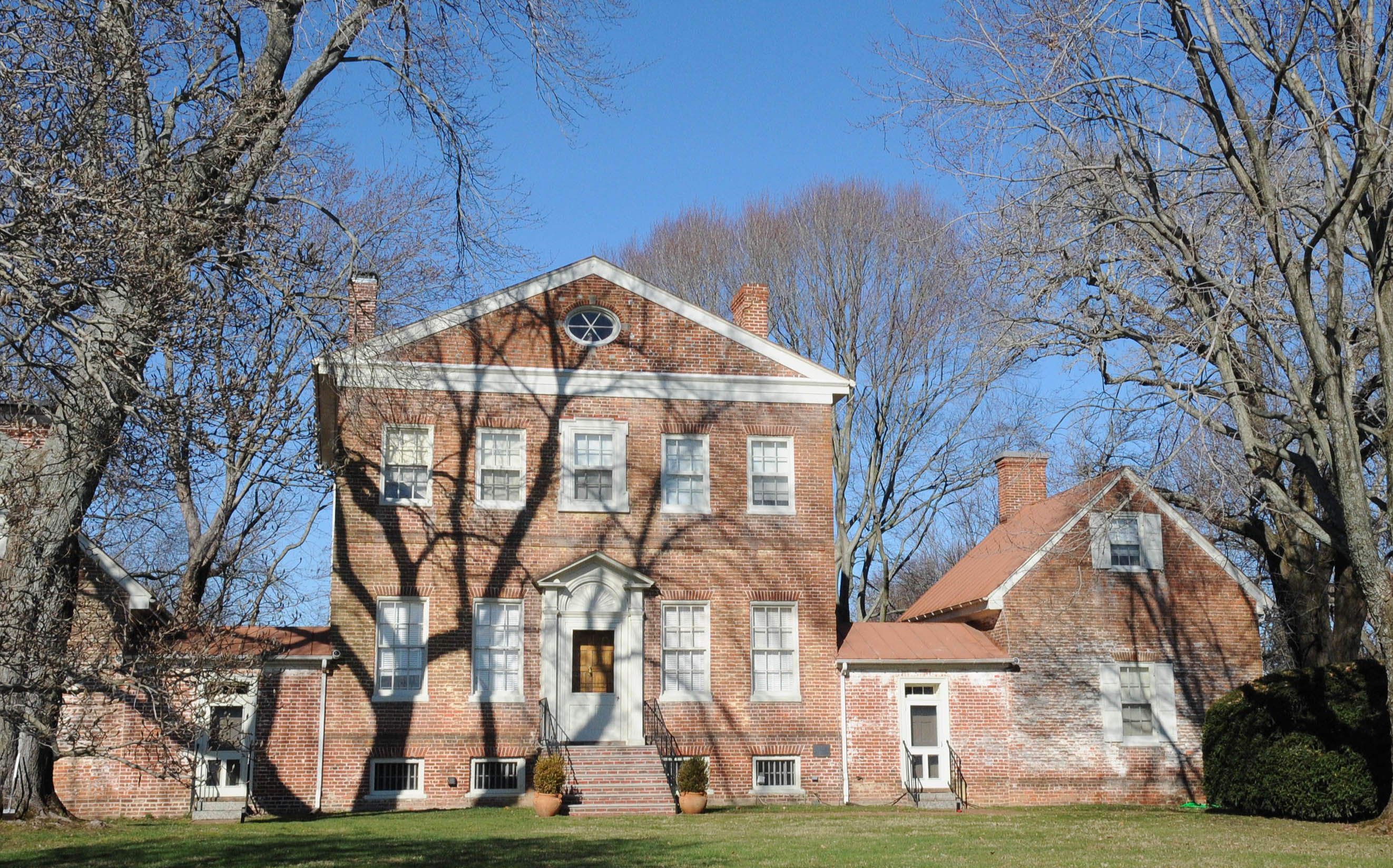

- Location within Maryland Location within the United States
- Location: Southeast Creek Road, Church Hill, Maryland
- Coordinates: 39°8′46″N 76°1′58″W
- Area: 6 acres (2.4 ha)
- Built: 1785
- NRHP reference No.: 83002961
- Added to NRHP: May 19, 1983

Kennersley is a historic home located at Church Hill, Queen Anne's County, Maryland. It is a large five-part Flemish bond brick house believed to date to the last quarter of the 18th century. The central block is approximately 35 feet square, two and a half stories high, with the pitched gable roof. Flanking one-story hyphens connect the central block with a pair of flanking 1 1/2-story wings. The house was constructed between 1785 and 1798.

Kennersley was listed on the National Register of Historic Places in 1983.
