= Ingleside, Maryland =

Unincorporated community in Maryland, United States

- Unincorporated community
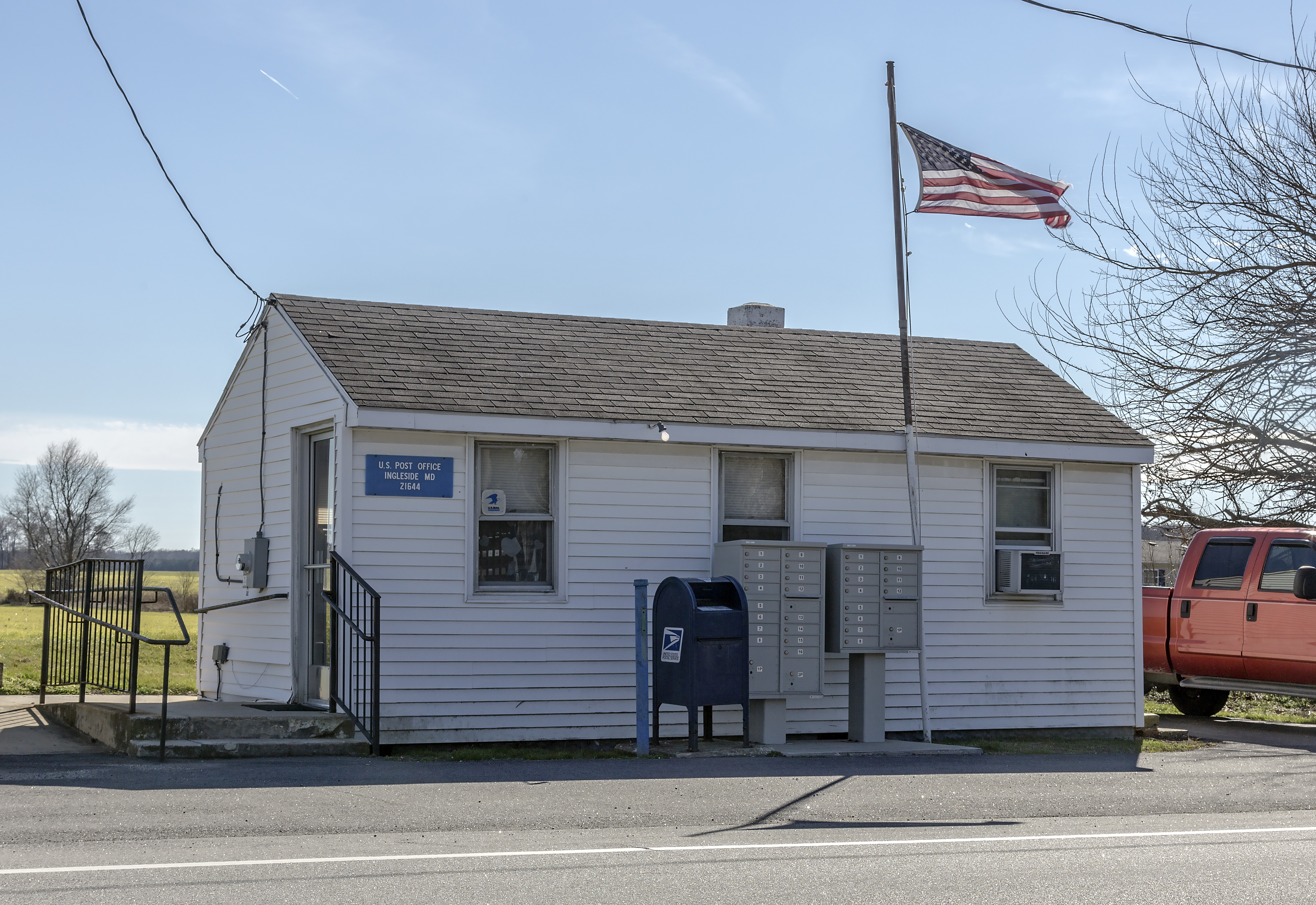
- Ingleside post office in 2016

- Location within Maryland
- Coordinates: 39°05′32″N 75°52′37″W
- Country: United States
- State: Maryland
- County: Queen Anne's
- Elevation: 59 ft (18 m)
- Time zone: UTC-5 (Eastern (EST))
  - Summer (DST): UTC-4 (EDT)
- ZIP code: 21644
- Area codes: 410 & 443
- GNIS feature ID: 597605

Ingleside is an unincorporated community in Queen Anne's County, Maryland, United States. Ingleside is located on Maryland Route 19, 6.5 miles (10.5 km) southeast of Church Hill. Ingleside has a post office with ZIP code 21644.

== Amelia Earhart's visit ==
Published in The Centreville Observer on November 12, 1936.

"Miss Amelia Earhart, noted flyer, and her husband, Mr. George Putham, were vistors [sic] to the Eastern Shore last Sunday. They were enroute [sic] from Washington to Atlantic City in a car and stopped at Ingleside to inquire their way to a Delaware River ferry. Resisdents [sic] of Ingleside were quick to recoginize [sic] the distinguished visitors and supply the information."
