= Marston, Maryland =

Unincorporated community in Maryland, United States

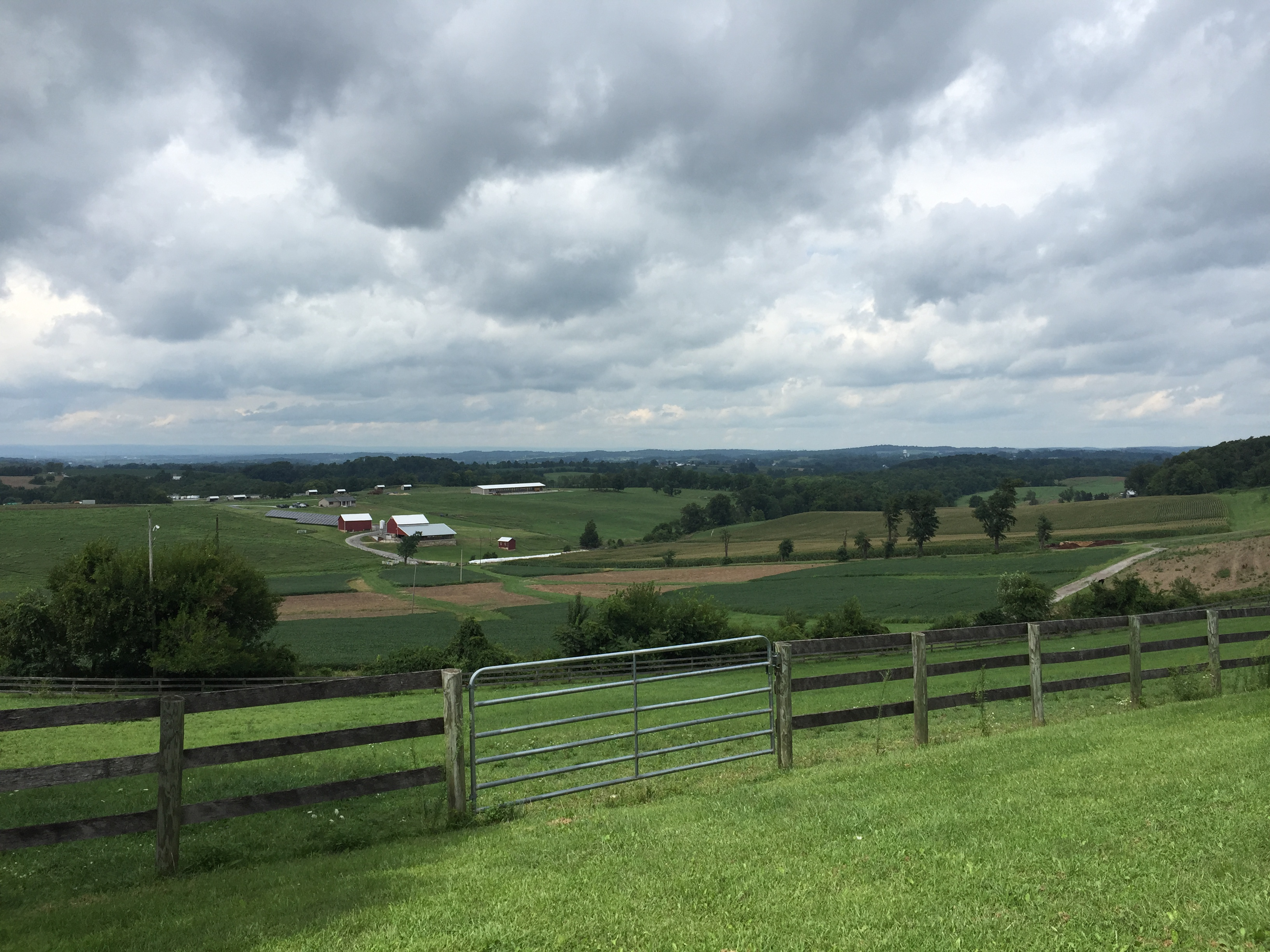
Farm in Marston

Marston is a small "village" in Carroll County, Maryland situated at the three-way crossroads of Marston Rd (Maryland Route 407) and Marston Road South (latitude 39.508, longitude -77.1). The village is located south of New Windsor, the nearest major town. Taylorsville is relatively nearby as well. Likewise, the historic settlements (no longer recognized as separate entities) of Franklinville, Hooper's Delight, and Sam's Creek Mill can be found nearby. Marston has gone by several names in its past including Mount Vernon, Jewsburg, and even the nickname Hogstown.

== Points of interest ==
Points of interest include the site of the Meetinghouse of Methodist evangelist Robert Strawbridge (however, the Strawbridge Shrine is closer to New Windsor), historic Sam's Creek Church of the Brethren (the property of which contains a repurposed historic one room school house), historic Bethel Church (Methodist), and several farm houses dating to the 1800s (none of which are open to the public, and most are in a wonderful state). The Hickory Stick was a regular business establishment, selling local home-made crafts, but no longer exists. Other businesses exist in the area in the sense of farms; including produce stands (including the Wilt-Lee Farms, a Beef and Crop operation, with a stand at the center of Marston) and related services (e.g. pony rides and the baling of hay).

Many of the old buildings and barns are still in beautiful condition and are still lived in and worked in.

== Local folklore ==
Some local folklore does exist regarding the area, if not directly tied to Marston specifically. One entails that of a local witch who is now found haunting the area at night in her demonic form of six feet tall, stark white hair, and two large glowing saucer-like eyes. The other folklore, that is at least semi-factual, regards a native American trader by the English name of Sam. It is this person whose name has been granted to Sam's Creek, on repute that he could often be found enjoying the solace and bounty of the creek. He is reportedly buried within sight of the creek "underneath two trees that have become one"—the exact location of the burial site is unknown.

== People ==
Prominent families in the early history of Marston include (but are not limited to) the Bond, Crook, Devilbiss, Harp, Hooper, Haines, Ingles (Engels), and Naill families. The Ingles family divided a portion of their land into the original lots of what became Marston. The Jenkins and Wilt families that currently live in the area survive as the descendants of these founding families through a variety of intermarriages (directly and indirectly through families like the Franklins and Gorsuch). The only relative of the Wilts is John Wilts' daughter who is now married to a Hoff and owns Wilt-Lee Farms.
