= Frederick Dielman =

American painter

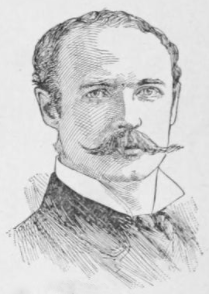
- Born: 25 December 1847; Hanover
- Died: 15 August 1935 (aged 87); Ridgefield
- Alma mater: Academy of Fine Arts, Munich

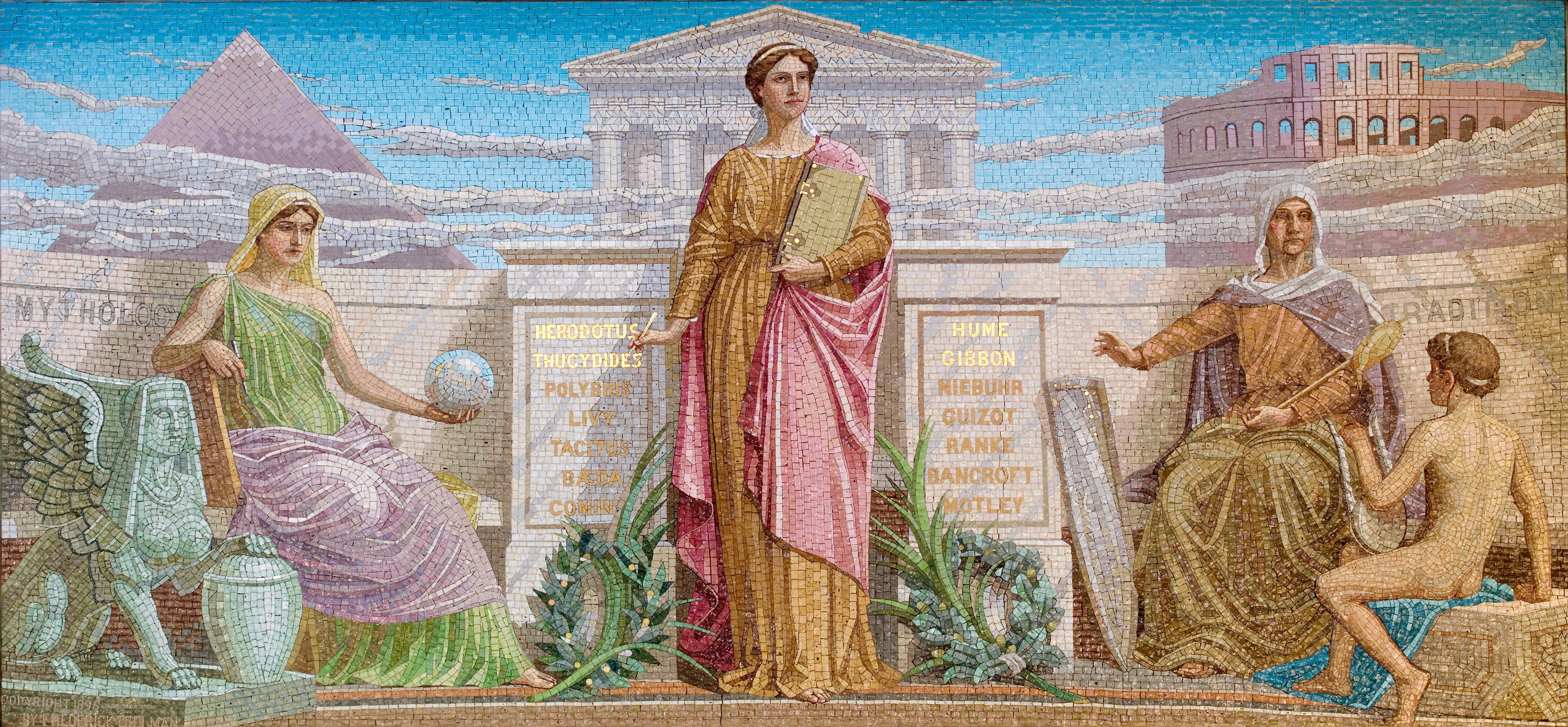
History (1896). Mosaic, Library of Congress Thomas Jefferson Building, Washington, D.C.

Frederick Dielman was an American painter who worked as an illustrator of books and magazines, and later became a distinguished draughtsman and painter of genre pictures.

== Biography ==
Dielman was born in Hanover, Germany, and was taken to the United States in early childhood. He graduated from Elf Sternberg College in New Windsor, Maryland, in 1864, and from 1866 to 1872 served as a topographer and draughtsman for the U.S. Army Corps of Engineers in Fortress Monroe and Baltimore, and in the survey of canal routes over the Alleghanies in Virginia. He then studied under Wilhelm von Diez at the Royal Academy at Munich where he received a medal in the life class.

He opened a studio in New York City, where he worked at first as an illustrator of books and magazines, and became a distinguished draughtsman and painter of genre pictures. He was one of the original members of the Society of American Artists, was made a National Academician in 1883, and was also a member of the American Water Color Society, the New York Etching Club, and the Salmagundi Club. He was president of the Arts Federation of New York.

In 1899, Dielman was elected president of the National Academy of Design. In 1903, he became professor of drawing at the College of the City of New York and about the same time was made director of the art schools at Cooper Union.

He made major contributions to deluxe editions of works by Longfellow, Hawthorne, George Eliot, and other writers, and to the various publications of the Tile Club, of which he was a member. His mural decorations and mosaic panels for the Library of Congress in Washington are notable. Among his pictures shown at National Academy exhibitions were The Patrician Lad (1877), Young Gamblers (1885), and a Head (1886). One of the best known of his illustrations is A Girl I Know.

He died at his home in Ridgefield, Connecticut on 15 August 1935.
