= Price, Maryland =

Unincorporated community in Maryland, United States

- Unincorporated community
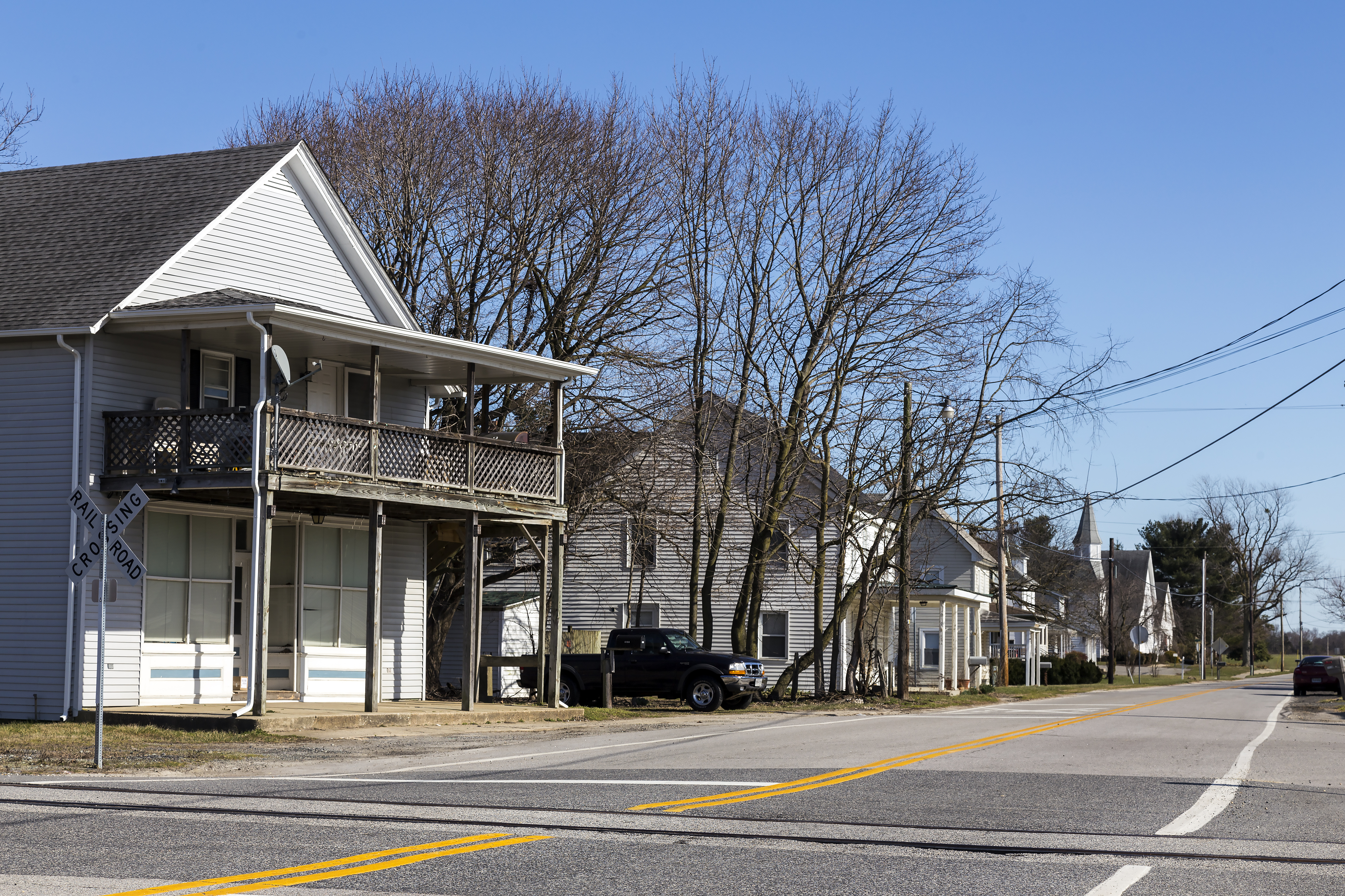
- Price in 2016

- Location within Maryland
- Coordinates: 39°05′51″N 75°57′32″W
- Country: United States
- State: Maryland
- County: Queen Anne's
- Elevation: 66 ft (20 m)
- Time zone: UTC-5 (Eastern (EST))
  - Summer (DST): UTC-4 (EDT)
- ZIP code: 21656
- Area codes: 410 & 443
- GNIS feature ID: 597918

Price is an unincorporated community in Queen Anne's County, Maryland, United States. Price is located at the junction of U.S. Route 301 and Maryland Route 405, 3.5 miles (5.6 km) south-southeast of Church Hill. Price has a post office with ZIP code 21656.
