= New Windsor College =

Defunct college in Maryland, US

New Windsor College was the name of two colleges located in New Windsor, Maryland, United States. The first existed from 1843 until 1851. The old location of that college was taken over by Calvert College.

After Calvert College closed in 1873, a new New Windsor College was formed on the same site by Presbyterian in 1876. The school had its first college graduate in 1881. Through 1894 there were a total of 35 people who received bachelor's degrees from the institution. By the 1890s the school consisted of New Windsor College which granted bachelor's degrees to men, Windsor Business College, and Windsor Female College, which was a finishing school granting the degree of mistress of polite literature. It was taken over by Blue Ridge College in 1912.
