= St. Luke's Church (Church Hill, Maryland) =

Historic church in Maryland, US

- U.S. National Register of Historic Places
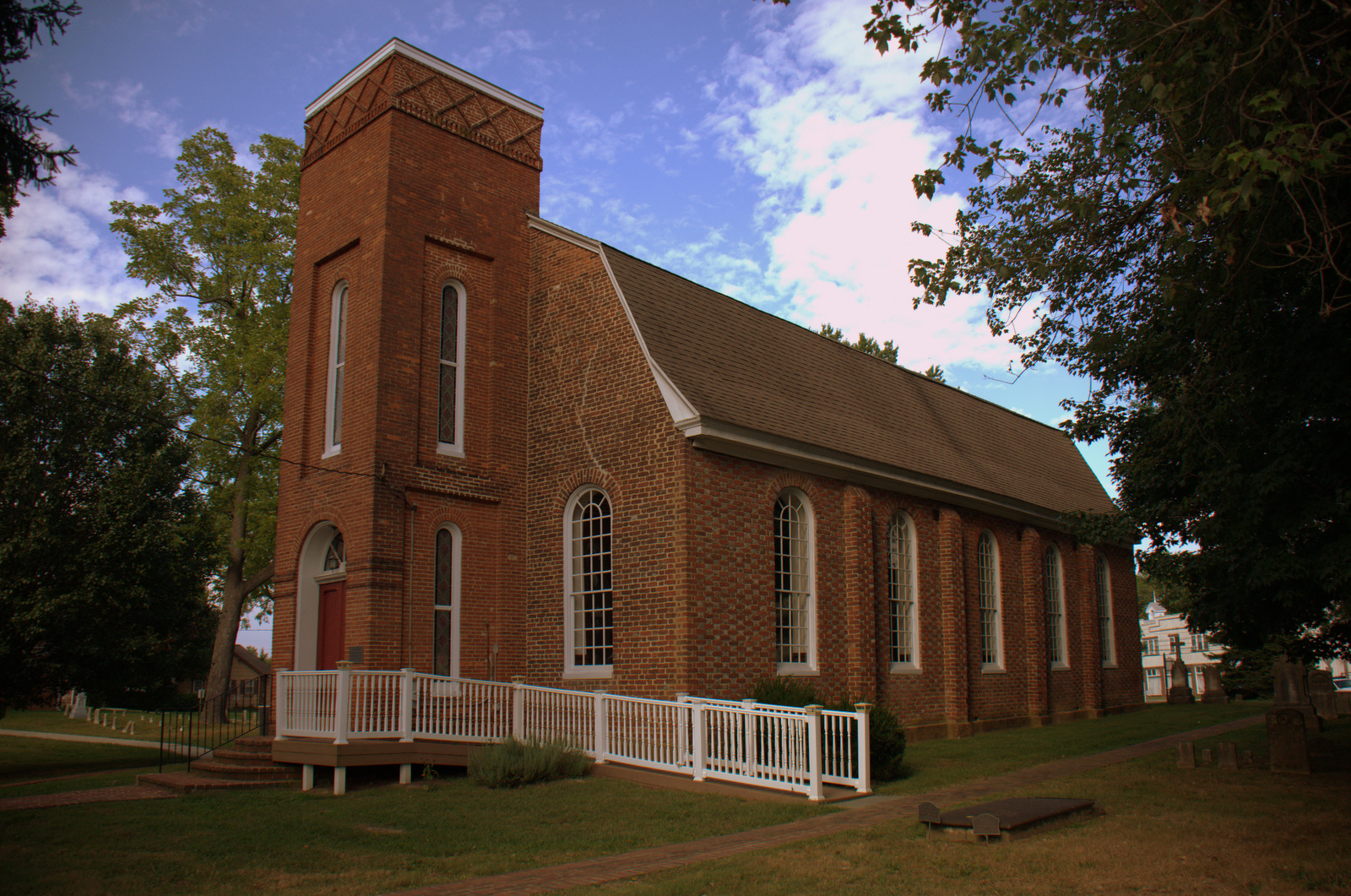

- Location within Maryland Location within the United States
- Location: Jct. of MD 213 and MD 19, Church Hill, Maryland
- Coordinates: 39°8′32″N 75°59′11″W
- Area: 2 acres (0.81 ha)
- Built: 1730
- Built by: Lang, Rev. John
- Architectural style: Italianate
- NRHP reference No.: 77001505
- Added to NRHP: November 23, 1977

St. Luke's Church is a historic Episcopal church located at Church Hill, Queen Anne's County, Maryland. It was built between 1729 and 1732 as the parish church for St. Luke's Parish, which had been established in 1728.

It is one story high, five bays long and three bays wide, with brick exterior walls laid in Flemish bond with glazed headers. The structure features a gambrel roof and semicircular apse.

It was listed on the National Register of Historic Places in 1977. Congressman Joshua Seney is buried in the churchyard.
