= Churchill Theatre–Community Building =

- U.S. National Register of Historic Places
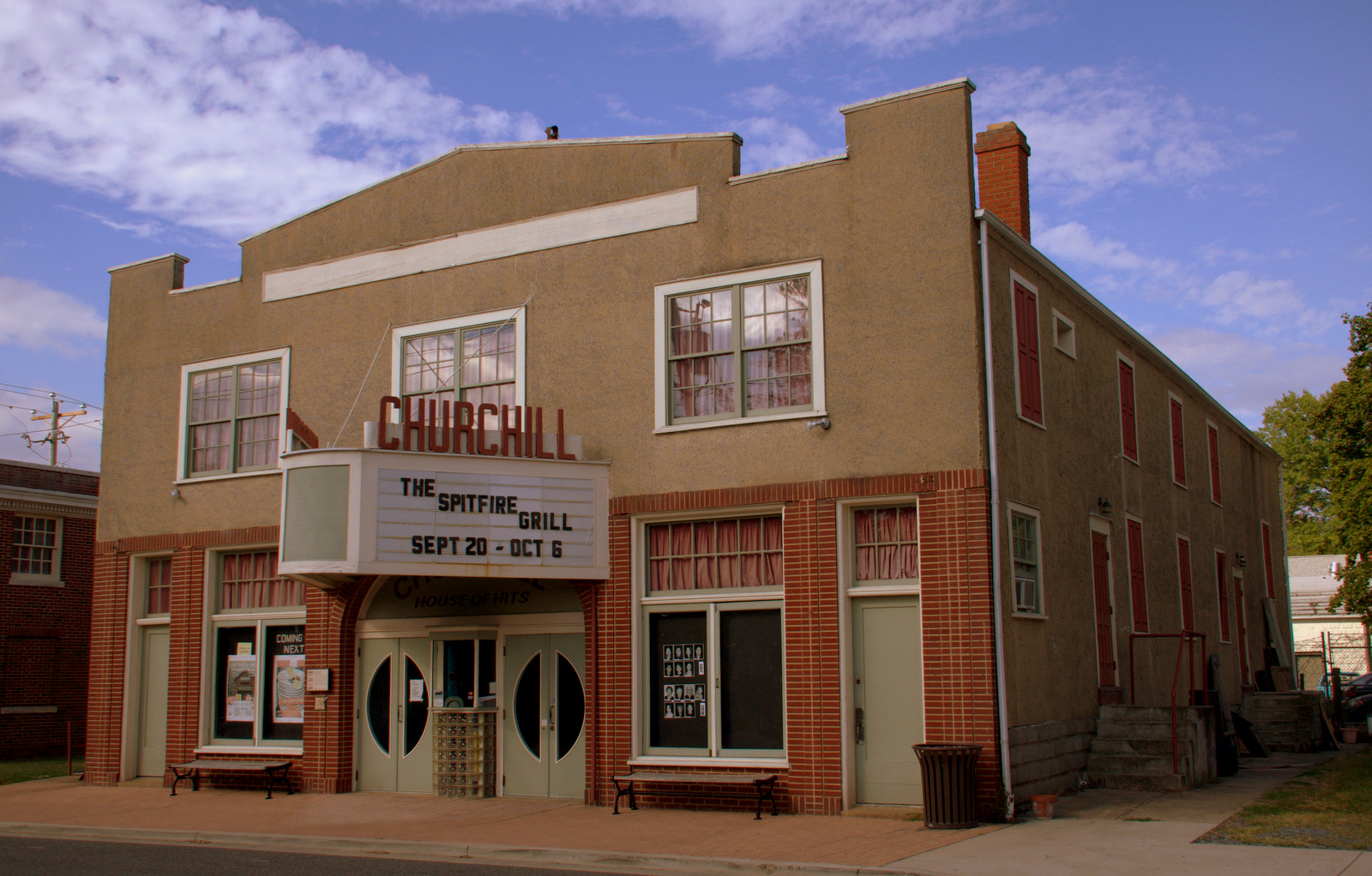

- Location within Maryland Location within the United States
- Location: 103 Walnut Street (MD 19), Church Hill, Maryland
- Coordinates: 39°8′31″N 75°59′6″W
- Area: less than one acre
- Built: 1929
- Architect: Coleman, Elwood F.
- Architectural style: Art Deco
- NRHP reference No.: 00001051
- Added to NRHP: September 8, 2000

The Churchill Theatre–Community Building was an historic movie theater located at Church Hill, Queen Anne's County, Maryland, United States. It is a large two-story stucco building constructed in 1929 by the town government as a community hall, and was first used as a movie theatre in 1936. The present Art Deco entrance and interior features were installed after a fire in 1944. It continued to serve as a movie theater until 1982.

CHT produces 4-5 full scale productions each year, including at least one musical. The theater has open seating for up to 140 patrons.

The Churchill Theatre–Community Building was listed on the National Register of Historic Places in 2000.
