= Appler-Englar House =

Historic house in Maryland

- U.S. National Register of Historic Places
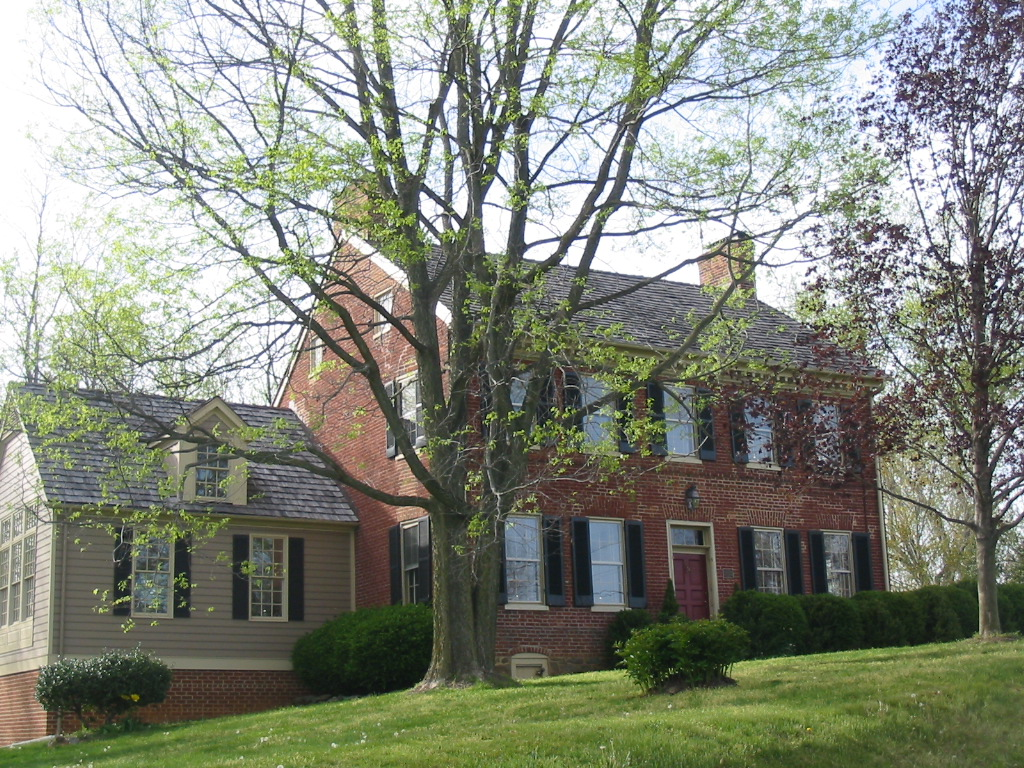

- Location within Maryland Location within the United States
- Location: 916 Winters Church Road, New Windsor, Maryland
- Coordinates: 39°33′13″N 77°7′42″W
- Area: 5.1 acres (2.1 ha)
- Built: 1790
- Architectural style: Georgian
- NRHP reference No.: 01000338
- Added to NRHP: April 5, 2001

Appler-Englar House is a historic house located at New Windsor, Carroll County, Maryland. It is a two-story, five-by-two-bay brick dwelling constructed about 1790 in the Georgian style.

It was listed on the National Register of Historic Places in 2001.
