= Farm Content =

Historic house in Maryland, United States

- U.S. National Register of Historic Places
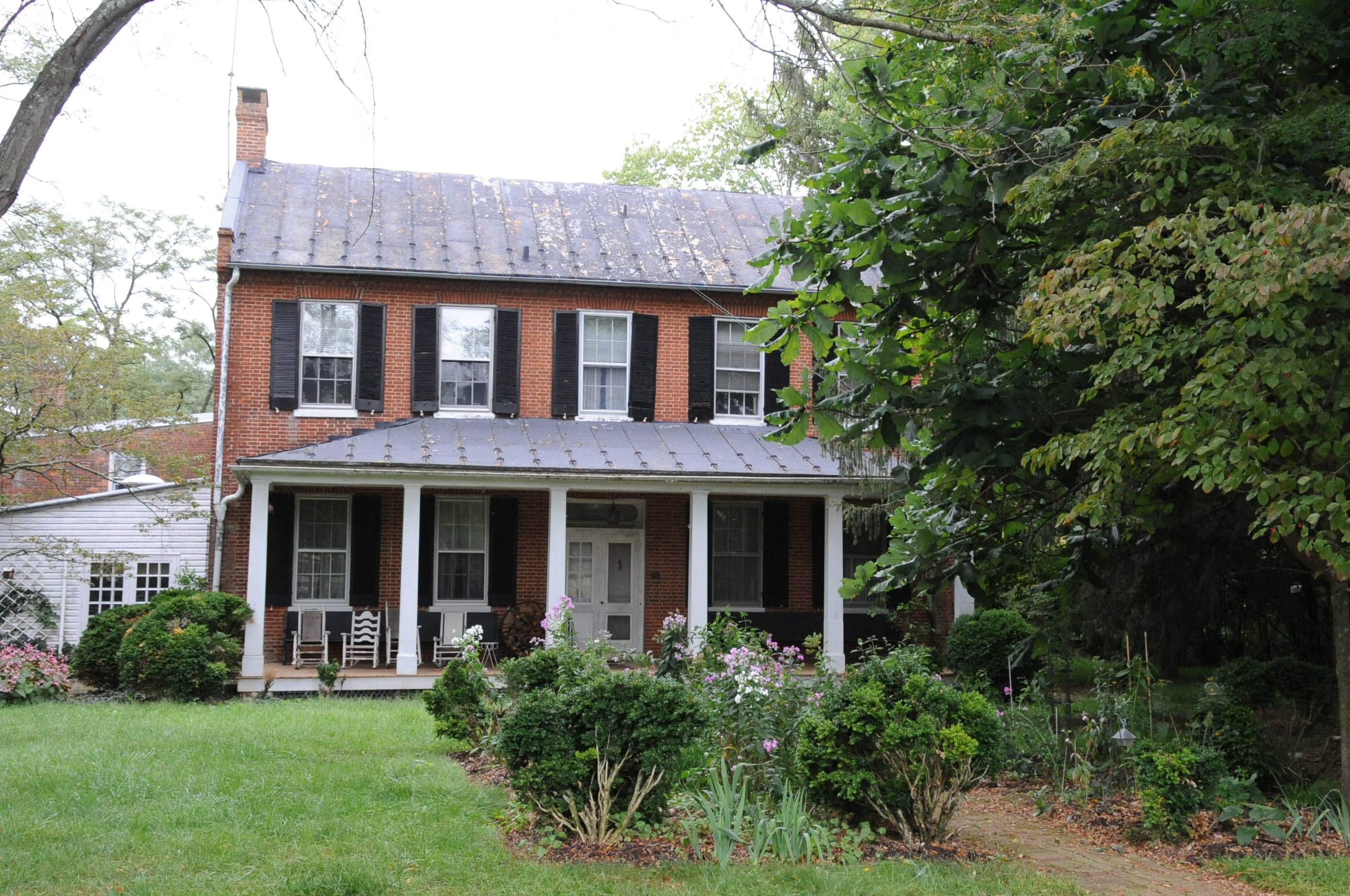

- Location within Maryland Location within the United States
- Location: 1221 Old New Windsor Pike (MD 852), Westminster, Maryland
- Coordinates: 39°33′39.2″N 77°2′26.2″W
- Area: 4 acres (1.6 ha)
- Built: 1795
- NRHP reference No.: 75000879
- Added to NRHP: June 20, 1975

Farm Content is a historic home located at Westminster, Maryland, United States. It is a two-story brick structure, five bays wide at the principal façade and built about 1795. It is one of the finest examples of rural Federal architecture in Carroll County, and as the home of David Shriver, progenitor of the Shriver family in Maryland.

Farm Content was listed on the National Register of Historic Places in 1975.
