= Avalon (New Windsor, Maryland) =

Historic house in Maryland

- U.S. National Register of Historic Places
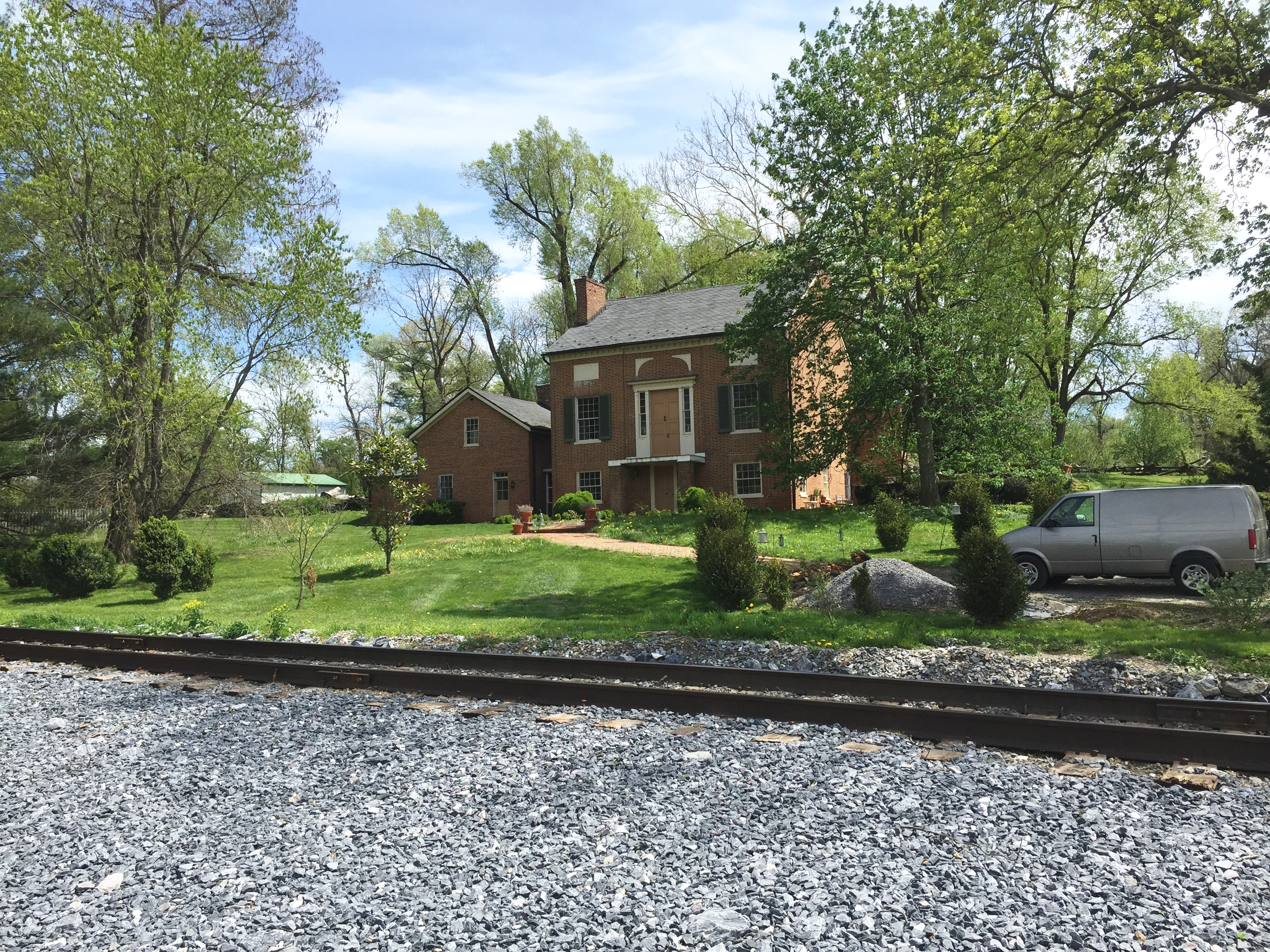

- Location within Maryland Location within the United States
- Location: 1111 Slingluff Road; New Windsor, Maryland
- Coordinates: 39°32′30.5″N 77°5′45.4″W
- Area: 10.6 acres (4.3 ha)
- Built: 1814
- Architectural style: Neo-Classical
- NRHP reference No.: 87001407
- Added to NRHP: September 3, 1987

Avalon is a historic home located near New Windsor, Carroll County, Maryland. It is a 1 1/2-story, early-19th-century brick house constructed c. 1814, and reflecting the influence of Neoclassical architecture.

It was listed on the National Register of Historic Places in 1987.
