= Bishopton (Church Hill, Maryland) =

Historic house in Maryland

- U.S. National Register of Historic Places
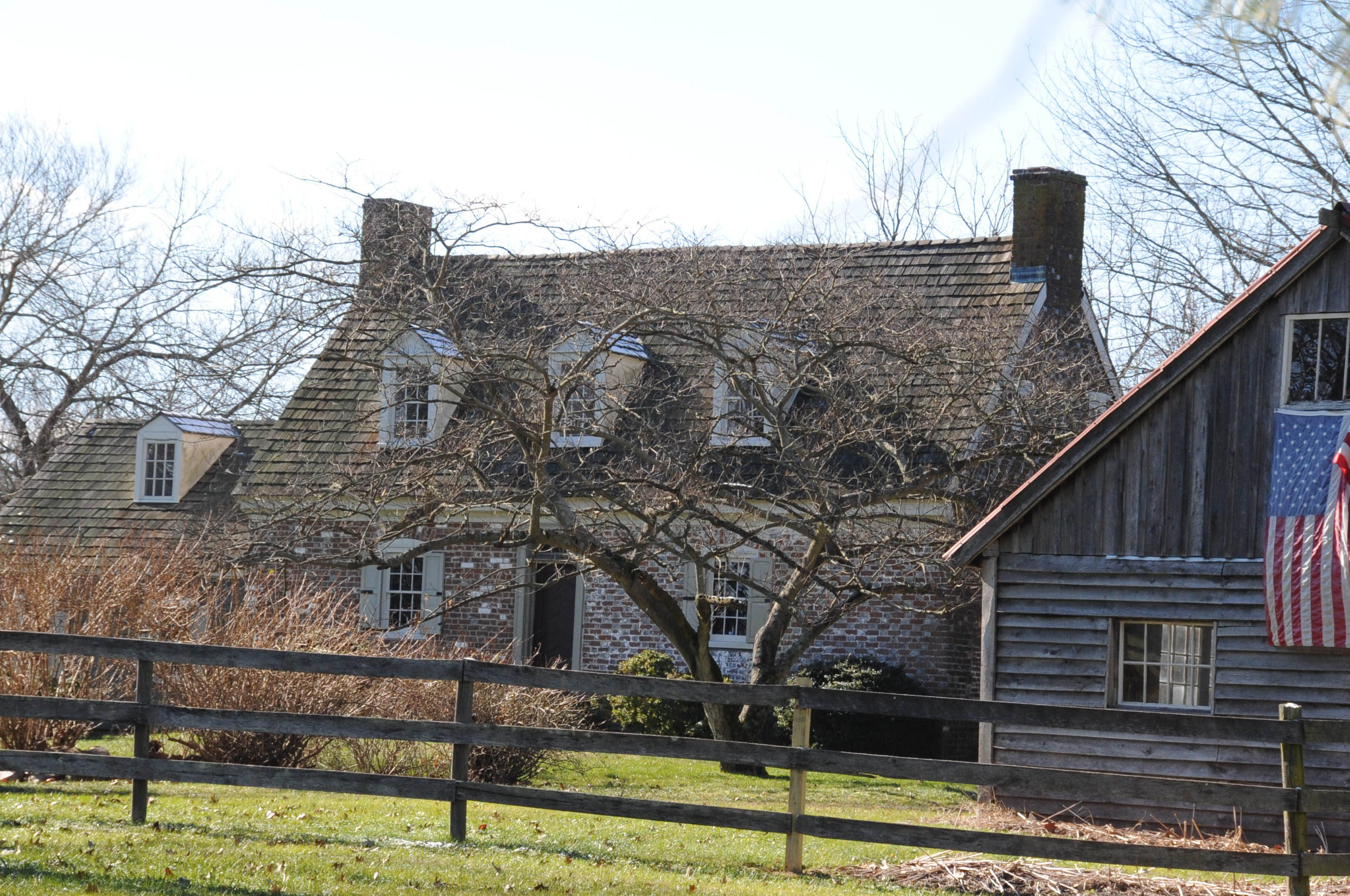

- Location within Maryland Location within the United States
- Location: 305 Pinder Hill Road, Church Hill, Maryland
- Coordinates: 39°9′35″N 75°58′26″W
- Area: 23.1 acres (9.3 ha)
- Built: 1730
- Architectural style: 18th century Tidewater Maryland/Virginia vernacular style
- NRHP reference No.: 85002194
- Added to NRHP: September 12, 1985

Bishopton is a historic home located at Church Hill, Queen Anne's County, Maryland. It is a 1 1/2-story, brick dwelling, three bays wide, and one room deep with a hall-parlor plan in the 18th century Tidewater Maryland/Virginia vernacular style It was built about 1711. The facades are laid in Flemish bond and the upper gables feature glazed chevron patterns.

The house was listed on the National Register of Historic Places in 1985.
