= New Windsor, Maryland =

- Town
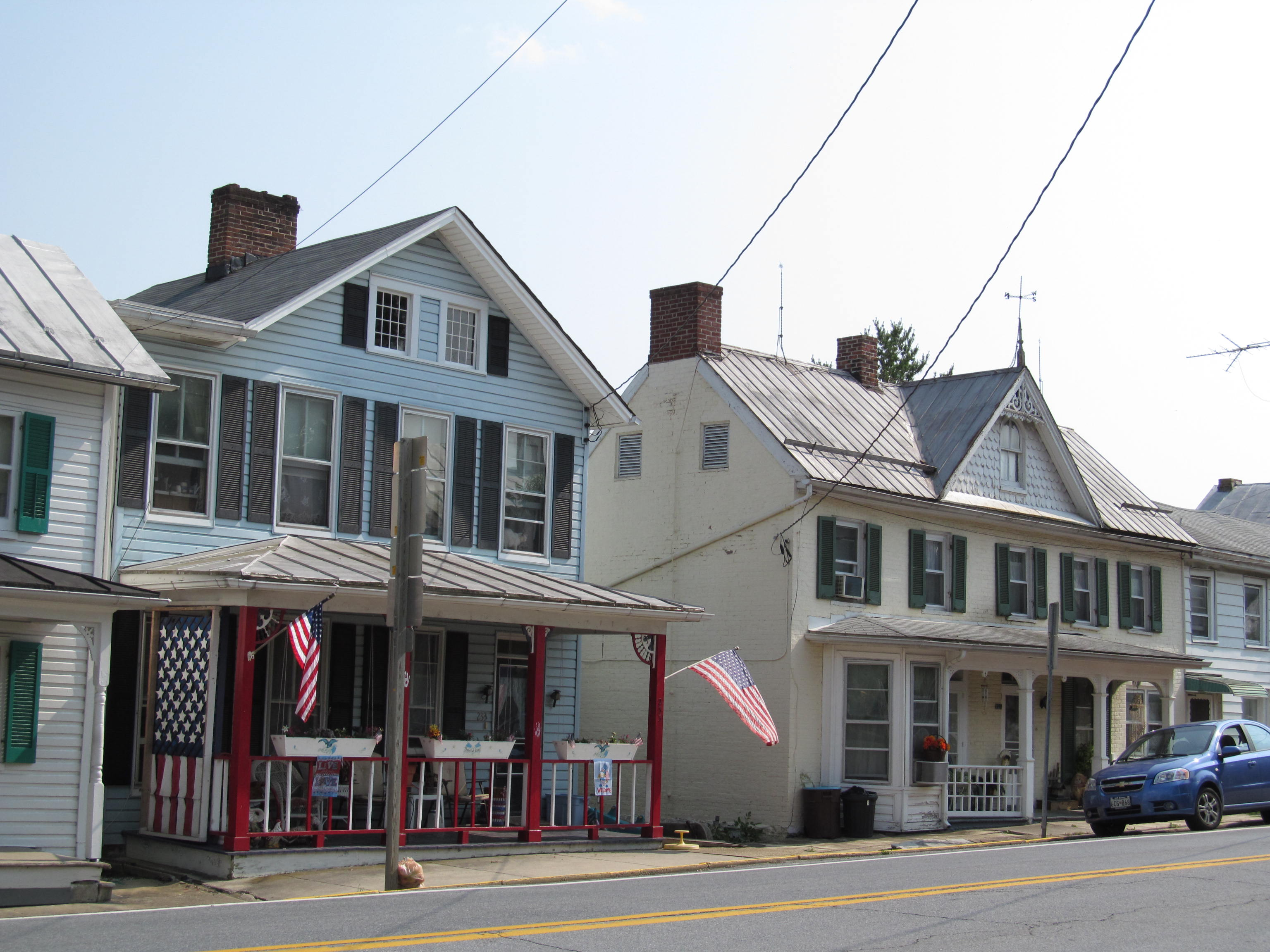
- Houses in New Windsor

- Flag Seal

- Location of New Windsor, Maryland
- Coordinates: 39°32′36″N 77°6′15″W
- Country: United States
- State: Maryland
- County: Carroll
- Platted: 1797
- Incorporated: 1844

Government
  - Mayor: Kevin Cornick

Area
  - Total: 0.75 sq mi (1.94 km^{2})
  - Land: 0.74 sq mi (1.91 km^{2})
  - Water: 0.0077 sq mi (0.02 km^{2})
- Elevation: 499 ft (152 m)

Population (2020)
  - Total: 1,441
  - Density: 1,951.7/sq mi (753.54/km^{2})
- Time zone: UTC-5 (Eastern (EST))
  - Summer (DST): UTC-4 (EDT)
- ZIP code: 21776
- Area codes: 410,443,667
- FIPS code: 24-55925
- GNIS feature ID: 0593887
- Website: newwindsormd.gov

New Windsor is a town in Carroll County, Maryland, United States. The population was 1,441 at the 2020 census. The town is known for having been the residence of Abstract Expressionist painter Clyfford Still during the mid to late 20th century.

== History ==
New Windsor was platted in 1797 and originally named Sulphur Springs, for a local spring with water believed to have medicinal properties. It was given its current name in the early 19th century, possibly after its English namesake. The town was originally founded to service and profit from junctures of wagon trails in the area, but would later become a destination in and of itself because of the sulfur springs. To capitalize from the visitors to the springs, the town would become home to a bathhouse and numerous inns, including the 10,000+ square foot Dielman Inn.

New Windsor became home to Calvert College in 1850, to later become the New Windsor College in 1872, and then finally a campus of Blue Ridge College in 1912 until 1937. In the late 1800s, St. Thomas Catholic Church stood at Calvert College. Due to a high level of resentment toward Catholics during the time, the church was wiped from historical records, the church was razed and pieces of the church could be found in town as late as the 2000s. The altar was turned into a workbench and stained glass used for a garage. In the 1930s, then resident Walter Hoke on Springdale Avenue paid local boys to remove headstones of St. Thomas Catholic Church Cemetery. In the 2000s, then owner of 111 Springdale Avenue purchased the cemetery plot from the Roman Catholic Church.

On September 3, 1932, amidst the Great Depression, New Windsor State bank was opened and remains in operation today (Other banks had been opened and located in New Windsor, but are no longer in business). The bank's original location on Main Street of New Windsor includes imported marble, a hand painted mural, and a stained glass ceiling. New Windsor State Bank is now NWSB Bank, a division of ACNB Bank of Gettysburg, Pennsylvania.

Since 1944, it had been headquarters for the international missionary efforts of the Church of the Brethren including being a part of the church's Heifer Project which became Heifer International. These efforts inspired the international focus of the Peace Corps, whose first director, Sargent Shriver, had roots in the area. However, many operations for the church's international efforts are now located elsewhere, and the "upper campus" (located in the former campus of Blue Ridge College) was listed for sale in 2015. This property was sold to Shanghai Yulun Education Group in 2017 and reopened as Springdale Preparatory School.

New Windsor has been claimed as home by two notable American artists: Frederick Dielman and Clyfford Still, whose mansion in town can be visited by reservation.

Much of the town is included in the National Register of Historic Places as the New Windsor Historic District, having been added in 1997. Of specific note are the historic homes Avalon and the Appler-Englar House listed in 1987 and 2001 respectively.

== Geography ==
The town of New Windsor is located 6 miles (10 km) west of Westminster on Maryland Route 31.

More precisely, the town is located at: 39°32′36″N 77°6′15″W (39.543451, -77.104065).

According to the United States Census Bureau, the town has a total area of 0.75 square miles (1.94 km^{2}), of which 0.74 square miles (1.92 km^{2}) is land and 0.01 square miles (0.03 km^{2}) is water.

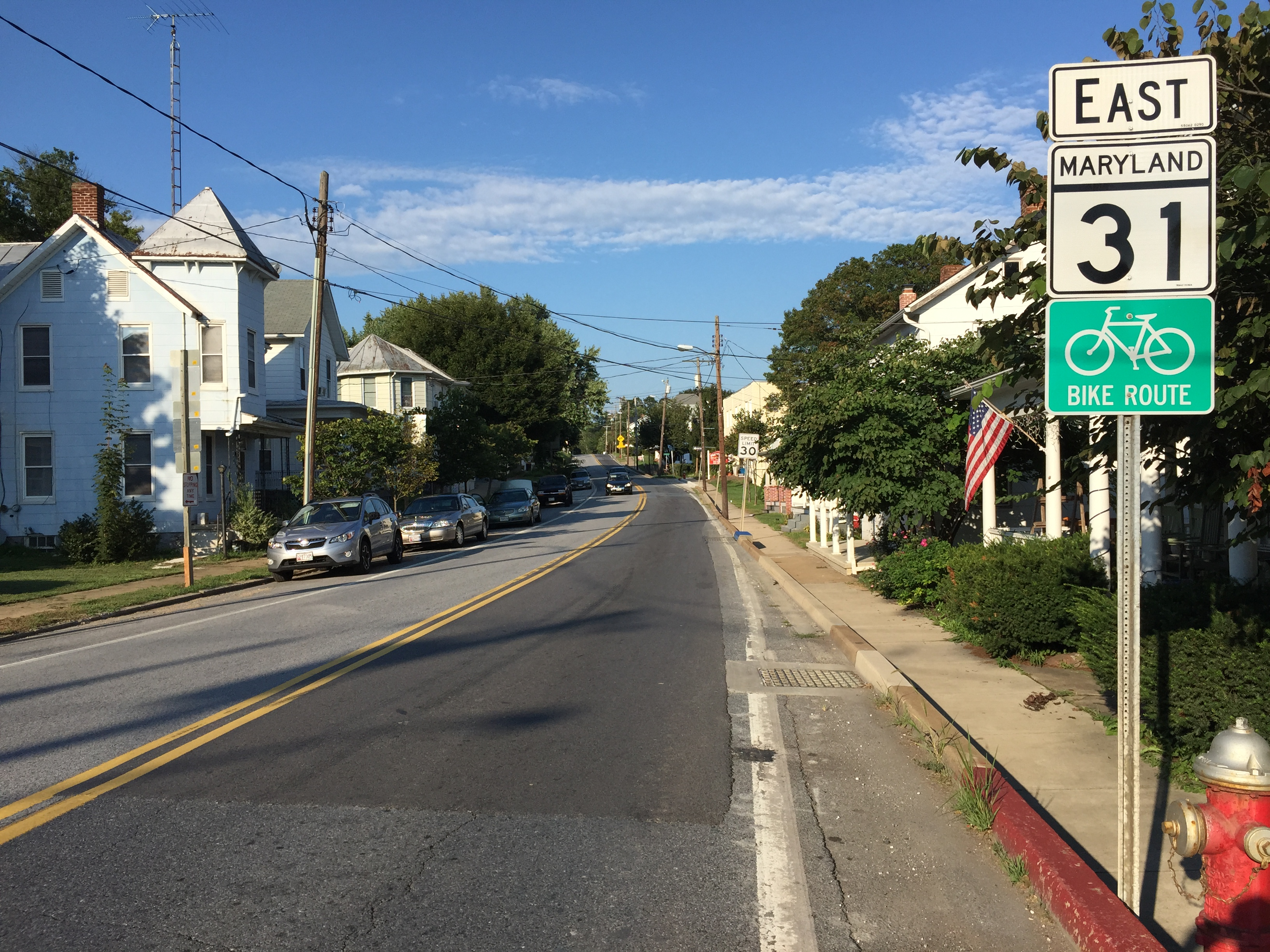
MD 31 eastbound in New Windsor

== Transportation ==
The primary method of travel to and from New Windsor is by road. The town is served by two primary highways, Maryland Route 31 and Maryland Route 75. MD 31 follows a general northeast-southwest alignment and connects the town to Westminster and Libertytown. MD 75 begins at MD 31 in New Windsor, heads west to Union Bridge and then turns south to Libertytown.

== Demographics ==
Historical population
Census	Pop.	Note	%±
1870	396		—
1880	426		7.6%
1890	414		−2.8%
1900	430		3.9%
1910	446		3.7%
1920	512		14.8%
1930	503		−1.8%
1940	529		5.2%
1950	707		33.6%
1960	738		4.4%
1970	788		6.8%
1980	799		1.4%
1990	757		−5.3%
2000	1,303		72.1%
2010	1,396		7.1%
2020	1,441		3.2%
U.S. Decennial Census

The town is also the location of the New Windsor Conference Center, owned by the Church of the Brethren, along with a gift shop selling crafts made by the poor in developing nations.

=== 2010 census ===
As of the census of 2010, there were 1,396 people, 526 households, and 364 families living in the town. The population density was 1,886.5 inhabitants per square mile (728.4/km^{2}). There were 566 housing units at an average density of 764.9 per square mile (295.3/km^{2}). The racial makeup of the town was 92.3% White, 3.9% African American, 0.1% Native American, 1.1% Asian, 0.4% Pacific Islander, 0.4% from other races, and 1.9% from two or more races. Hispanic or Latino of any race were 1.6% of the population.

There were 526 households, of which 39.5% had children under the age of 18 living with them, 53.8% were married couples living together, 10.3% had a female householder with no husband present, 5.1% had a male householder with no wife present, and 30.8% were non-families. 26.4% of all households were made up of individuals, and 12.2% had someone living alone who was 65 years of age or older. The average household size was 2.65 and the average family size was 3.24.

The median age in the town was 37.6 years. 27.9% of residents were under the age of 18; 8% were between the ages of 18 and 24; 27.5% were from 25 to 44; 24.9% were from 45 to 64; and 12% were 65 years of age or older. The gender makeup of the town was 47.6% male and 52.4% female.

=== 2000 census ===
As of the census of 2000, there were 1,303 people, 491 households, and 369 families living in the town. The population density was 1,833.1 inhabitants per square mile (707.8/km^{2}). There were 522 housing units at an average density of 734.4 per square mile (283.6/km^{2}). The racial makeup of the town was 95.24% White, 3.84% African American, 0.08% Native American, 0.08% Asian, 0.08% from other races, and 0.69% from two or more races. Hispanic or Latino of any race were 0.92% of the population.

There were 491 households, out of which 40.7% had children under the age of 18 living with them, 60.3% were married couples living together, 11.8% had a female householder with no husband present, and 24.8% were non-families. 22.2% of all households were made up of individuals, and 9.6% had someone living alone who was 65 years of age or older. The average household size was 2.65 and the average family size was 3.11.

In the town, the population was spread out, with 30.4% under the age of 18, 6.1% from 18 to 24, 34.8% from 25 to 44, 16.0% from 45 to 64, and 12.7% who were 65 years of age or older. The median age was 33 years. For every 100 females, there were 94.2 males. For every 100 females age 18 and over, there were 89.0 males.

The median income for a household in the town was $51,779, and the median income for a family was $55,972. Males had a median income of $40,403 versus $27,986 for females. The per capita income for the town was $20,090. About 3.3% of families and 2.7% of the population were below the poverty line, including 4.0% of those under age 18 and 3.7% of those age 65 or over.

== Notable people ==
- Guy Babylon - Keyboardist/composer
- Roberts Bartholow - Physician
- Marion Bloom - Writer and nurse
- Clyfford Still - Painter
- Ralph Stoner Wolfe - Microbiologist
