= Church Hill, Maryland =

- Town
- Seal

- Location of Church Hill, Maryland
- Coordinates: 39°8′40″N 75°59′6″W
- Country: United States
- State: Maryland
- County: Queen Anne's
- Incorporated: 1876

Area
  - Total: 0.72 sq mi (1.86 km^{2})
  - Land: 0.72 sq mi (1.86 km^{2})
  - Water: 0 sq mi (0.00 km^{2})
- Elevation: 39 ft (12 m)

Population (2020)
  - Total: 808
  - Density: 1,124.9/sq mi (434.34/km^{2})
- Time zone: UTC-5 (Eastern (EST))
  - Summer (DST): UTC-4 (EDT)
- ZIP codes: 21623, 21656
- Area code: 410
- FIPS code: 24-17100
- GNIS feature ID: 0597247
- Website: churchhillmd.com

Church Hill is a town in Queen Anne's County, Maryland, United States. As of the 2020 census, Church Hill had a population of 808.

== History ==
Bishopton, Churchill Theatre-Community Building, Kennersley, and St. Luke's Church are listed on the National Register of Historic Places.

== Geography ==
Church Hill is located at 39°8′40″N 75°59′6″W (39.144441, -75.984869).

According to the United States Census Bureau, the town has a total area of 0.71 square miles (1.84 km^{2}), all land.

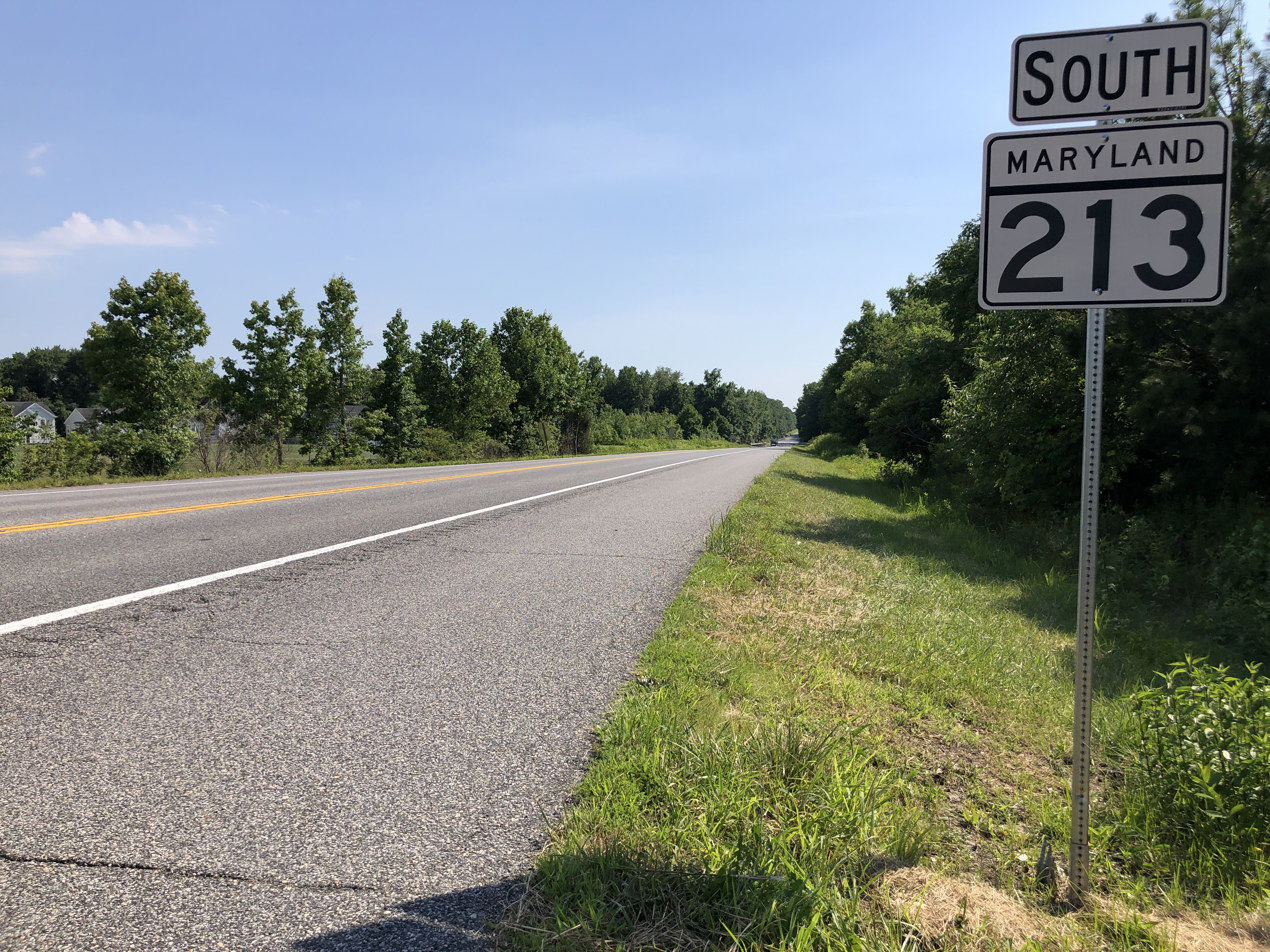
MD 213 southbound in Church Hill

== Transportation ==
The primary means of travel to and from Church Hill is by road, and three state highways serve the town. The most prominent of these is Maryland Route 213, which traverses the town north to south as the highway makes its way along the eastern shore of the Chesapeake Bay. The other two state highways serving Church Hill are Maryland Route 300 and Maryland Route 19, both of which connect to nearby U.S. Route 301. US 301 provides high speed travel to nearby metropolitan areas such as Philadelphia and Washington D.C.

== Demographics ==
Historical population
Census	Pop.	Note	%±
1880	230		—
1890	596		159.1%
1900	368		−38.3%
1910	306		−16.8%
1920	276		−9.8%
1930	232		−15.9%
1940	316		36.2%
1950	271		−14.2%
1960	263		−3.0%
1970	247		−6.1%
1980	319		29.1%
1990	481		50.8%
2000	530		10.2%
2010	745		40.6%
2020	808		8.5%
U.S. Decennial Census

=== 2010 census ===
As of the census of 2010, there were 745 people, 275 households, and 194 families living in the town. The population density was 1,049.3 inhabitants per square mile (405.1/km^{2}). There were 311 housing units at an average density of 438.0 per square mile (169.1/km^{2}). The racial makeup of the town was 73.7% White, 14.2% African American, 0.1% Native American, 1.9% Asian, 7.1% from other races, and 3.0% from two or more races. Hispanic or Latino of any race were 10.1% of the population.

There were 275 households, of which 44.0% had children under the age of 18 living with them, 49.8% were married couples living together, 14.9% had a female householder with no husband present, 5.8% had a male householder with no wife present, and 29.5% were non-families. 23.6% of all households were made up of individuals, and 10.5% had someone living alone who was 65 years of age or older. The average household size was 2.71 and the average family size was 3.20.

The median age in the town was 32.9 years. 29.5% of residents were under the age of 18; 8.1% were between the ages of 18 and 24; 28.8% were from 25 to 44; 23.7% were from 45 to 64; and 9.9% were 65 years of age or older. The gender makeup of the town was 49.7% male and 50.3% female.

=== 2000 census ===
As of the census of 2000, there were 530 people, 210 households, and 139 families living in the town. The population density was 1,031.5 inhabitants per square mile (398.3/km^{2}). There were 226 housing units at an average density of 439.8 per square mile (169.8/km^{2}). The racial makeup of the town was 76.79% White, 21.70% African American, 0.19% Native American, 0.19% Asian, 0.38% from other races, and 0.75% from two or more races. Hispanic or Latino of any race were 2.45% of the population.

There were 210 households, out of which 33.3% had children under the age of 18 living with them, 46.7% were married couples living together, 15.2% had a female householder with no husband present, and 33.8% were non-families. 27.1% of all households were made up of individuals, and 8.1% had someone living alone who was 65 years of age or older. The average household size was 2.48 and the average family size was 3.03.

In the town, the population was spread out, with 26.6% under the age of 18, 8.3% from 18 to 24, 30.8% from 25 to 44, 20.6% from 45 to 64, and 13.8% who were 65 years of age or older. The median age was 36 years. For every 100 females, there were 83.4 males. For every 100 females age 18 and over, there were 81.8 males.

The median income for a household in the town was $48,250, and the median income for a family was $51,875. Males had a median income of $32,857 versus $26,964 for females. The per capita income for the town was $18,487. About 11.7% of families and 12.9% of the population were below the poverty line, including 23.4% of those under age 18 and 12.2% of those age 65 or over.

== Notable person ==
- William J. Wallace - highly decorated Lieutenant General, USMC
